= A Family Finds Entertainment =

2004 video artwork

- Directed by: Ryan Trecartin
- Release date: 2004
- Running time: 41 minutes
- Language: English

A Family Finds Entertainment is a 2004 video artwork by Ryan Trecartin, known for launching his career as a filmmaker. The video, shot in a frenetic, self-conscious style, features a disturbed boy who locks himself in his bathroom during a wild party while his friends have disassociated conversations.

== Description ==
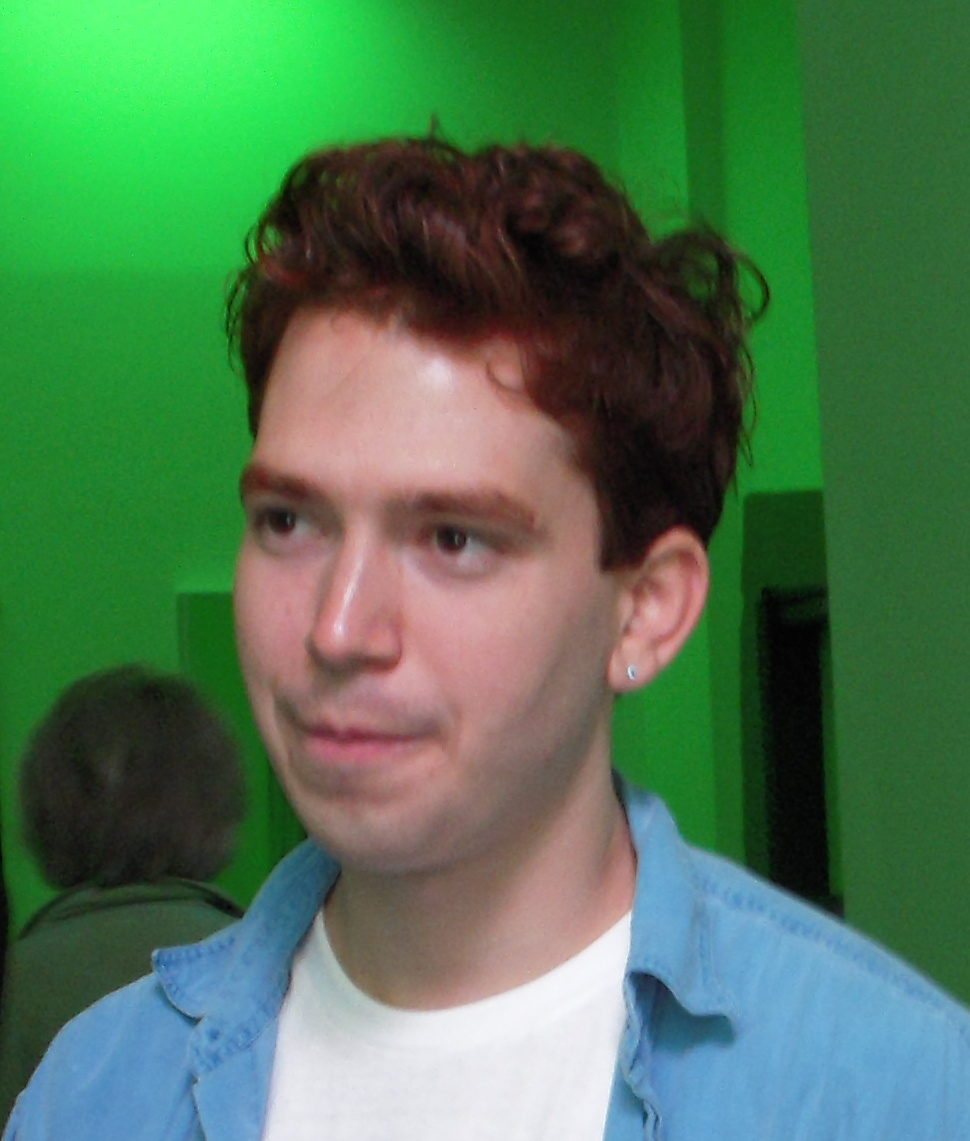
Trecartin in 2009

A Family Finds Entertainment features Skippy (Ryan Trecartin), a disturbed boy in garish makeup who has locked himself in his family's bathroom during a wild party. He rhapsodizes existentially and cuts himself with a knife. Elsewhere in the house, his friends and family implore him to come out, among other disassociated conversations mostly about Skippy but interspersed with mood swings and disorienting visual effects. He leaves the bathroom and borrows money from his lewd parents. Upon exiting the house, a documentarian wants to make a film about Skippy, who is quickly and fatally hit by a car. Inside the house, Shin (also played by Trecartin) receives a cell phone call about Skippy's death and histrionically attempts to compose herself and impart the news to her friends. Upon doing so, a band's music lifts Skippy's spirit from his body. The group goes outside to light fireworks but runs indoors before the police arrive.

The video's frenzied, stagey, exaggerated, self-conscious style and acting is reminiscent of YouTubers (individuals performing asides to a camera, "hyperactive and narcissistic"), though the video predates the service. The video focuses less on its story than as a fast-paced blur of events: "somewhat incomprehensible, strangely mesmerizing, and overstimulating to the point of exhaustion". Its script borrows from television reality show and talk show language, its actors wear homemade costumes.

== Production and promotion ==
The video was Trecartin's art school thesis project at Rhode Island School of Design. His collaborators, including Lizzie Fitch, also attended the school and continued to live and work with him after their 2004 graduation. The group moved to New Orleans and worked in a restaurant while searching Friendster for an audience. They sent DVDs to those who responded positively to their cold emails. In a form of early-Internet social networking, Cleveland art school students shared the video with visiting artist Sue de Beer, who passed it to a curator who connected Trecartin with Elizabeth Dee, Trecartin's eventual art dealer. A Family Finds Entertainment was included in the 2006 Whitney Biennial. The single-channel video runs 41 minutes.

== Reception and legacy ==
The video established Trecartin's career. Dennis Cooper wrote that Trecartin achieved a simultaneous balance of sophistication and maniacal focus, based on expert editing and talent for avant-garde, complex narratives. These traits, wrote Cooper, help the film evade the usual art film deconstructive analysis. The work was exciting for its freshness. "A Family Finds Entertainment" has a close connection with the Internet, both as a source of inspiration and the medium used to share it. Trecartin uploaded the video to YouTube two years after its creation, making him an early artist to use social media as a primary form of dissemination.
