= Hannah Perry =

British artist (born 1984)

- Born: 14 September 1984 (age 41); Chester, England
- Education: Goldsmiths University (BFA, 2009); Royal Academy of Arts (M.A., 2014)
- Occupation: Artist
- Movement: Post-internet, performance art, sculpture, installation art

Hannah Perry (born 1984) is a British artist known for her work in installation, sculpture, print and video. She blends personal references with popular culture to create videos, sounds, images and objects.

== Biography ==
Perry was born in Chester, England. She attended Goldsmiths, University of London receiving a BFA in Fine Art in 2009. She went on to complete an M.A. in Fine Art at The Royal Academy of Arts in 2014. She currently lives and works in London.

== Career ==
Perry's work is interdisciplinary, encompassing video, installation, sculpture, painting, screen printing and performance. In 2011, she first gained recognition for her video performance as part of South London art collective LuckyPDF's TV project for Frieze Art Fair. In 2014, a performance work called Deja Vu! was presented at the Serpentine Galleries Park Nights, a performance collaboration where she brought together various creatives including composer Mica Levi and British poet Sam Riviere, with whom she continues to collaborate with.

Her largest solo exhibition to date was Manual Labour, held at Baltic centre for Contemporary Arts in June 2024, which featured an immersive environment comprising film, sculpture, print and sound. In October 2018, she also presented GUSH! at Somerset House, London, which featured a sound-sculpture installation and 360 degree video. Perry presented another performance artwork during the exhibition in collaboration with musicians from the London Contemporary Orchestra including Robert Ames and Oliver Coates and music producers Mica Levi and Coby Sey who played a live score soundtrack to the dance piece.

Perry has participated in various group exhibitions alongside artists such as Ed Atkins, Trisha Baga, Ed Fornieles, Shana Moulton, Takeshi Murata, Jon Rafman and Ryan Trecartin. Her work My Pharmaceuticals was featured in Channel 4 Random Acts series in partnership with Arts Council England in 2016.

== Work ==
Much of Perry's practice centres around themes of class and gender. Curator and critic Jonathan Griffin described Perry's work as "messy, emotive" piece that combine material sourced from both online and her daily life. Perry blends these elements in videos, which she typically displays on monitors attached to sculptural installations, often supported by steel scaffolding poles beside hanging curtains of fabric or vinyl." Drawing from sources such as psychotherapy papers, narrative writing and her personal emails, Perry's video and installations explore several stereotypes typically associated with women, particularly those related to female hysteria. She works with low-resolution imagery linked to femininity and hysteria, as well as machismo and industrialism, and juxtaposing these with trance music and materials such as latex, mirrors and hair.
