= Ed Fornieles =

British artist (born 1983)

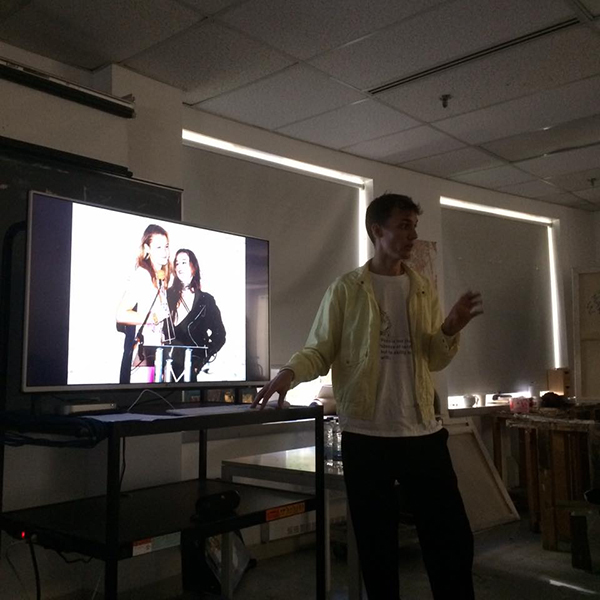
- Ed Fornieles
- Born: 6 April 1983 (age 43); Hampshire, England
- Education: University of Oxford (BFA, 2005); Royal College of Art (M.A., 2011)
- Occupation: Artist
- Movement: Post-Internet, performance art, sculpture, installation art
- Partner: Felicity Jones (2003–2013)

Edward Fornieles (born 6 April 1983) is an English artist. Fornieles uses film, social media platforms, sculpture, installation and performance to express the interaction of family, relationships, popular memes, language and the subcultures of the 21st century. His work operates within immersive simulations, which construct and enact alternative political and social spaces. His projects often involve cultural, social, and infrastructural production.

== Biography ==
Fornieles was born in Petersfield in Hampshire, where his parents had an architectural practice. Fornieles attended the University of Oxford, receiving his BFA from the Ruskin School of Drawing and Fine Art in 2005. He went on to the Royal College of Art in London, completing an M.A. in sculpture in 2011. While in graduate school, Fornieles worked as a studio assistant to Anish Kapoor, where he demonstrated his extensive technical skills. Living in East London, he often worked as a freelance data analyst while he immersed himself in art and curating, having established in 2007 (with Ross McNicol and Vanessa Carlos), the Wallis Gallery. During this time Fornieles's work evolved mocking, often with a dark sense of humour, the high seriousness of the London art scene.

Ed Fornieles has lived and worked in London, Los Angeles, and Montreal.

== Work ==
Fornieles was first recognized for his performance pieces such as Animal House (2011) at the experimental space, Guest Projects in London. Animal House helped refine a method that Fornieles would repeat in his subsequent works, engaging participants and viewers in sometimes awkward situations. Dorm Daze, grew out of Fornieles's interest in American fraternity culture as a large-scale on-line performance played-out on Facebook, where participants adopted profiles taken from real life American college students. Fornieles work focuses on the effect of narratives, habits, and technology in the formation of social roles and personal identity. He uses performance to re-enact and distort relationships to archetypes and conventions. Each chapter of work is driven by an intense period of research centered on reinterpreting and remodeling the subject under investigation. The Dreamy Awards (2012), was a fictional ceremony initiated to raise questions about the cult of the awards bash. The work was presented at the Serpentine Galleries Park Nights with the participation of over 200 people, including actor Zac Efron, in a pre-recorded video clip. Other works include, New York New York Happy Happy (NY NY HP HP) (2013) where Fornieles was invited by Rhizome to organize a gala at the New Museum. The event was controversial because Fornieles scripted both actual Museum donors and actors, blurring any sense of reality. Modern Family (2014) was a sullen installation where Fornieles explored the breakdown of the family both metaphorically and literally.

Ed Fornieles first solo gallery exhibition, The Hangover Part II, constructed from the detritus of Animal House, was organized at the Carlos/Ishikawa Gallery, London in 2011. Other significant sculptural installations include Characterdate, Frame (2012), at the Frieze Art Fair, London, where he continued demonstrating his interest in American college culture. Despicable Me 2 (2013) at the Mihai Nicodim Gallery in Los Angeles, invented a female character, "Britney Rivers" who develops a stereotypical personality as she builds her network of friends on Social Media. With Jupiter Ascending (2015) at Carl Kostyal, Stockholm, Fornieles recreated a spa reflecting the meditative culture associated with care of the body and Der Geist: Flesh Feast (2016) at Arratia Beer in Berlin continued the body theme in which Fornieles expressed, through film, objects, and installation, his attempt to adopt a self-management diet. Fornieles has also been invited to participate in important group shows curated to bring together Post-Internet creators. These include Meanwhile... Suddenly, and Then curated by Gunnar B. Kvaranat for the 12e Biennale d'art contemporain de Lyon, Family state of mind (2014) with Petra Cortright at Galerie Chez Valentin in Paris, and I feel we think bad (2016) with Hannah Perry and Matt Goerzen at 'Arsenal' in Montreal.

== Curating ==
In September 2019 Fornieles curated a show at Lisa Kandlhofer Gallery in Vienna. The show's title was Cursed Images and included artists John Bock, Doug Bressler, Chris Burden, VALIE EXPORT, Ann Hirsch, Joey Holder, Rachel Maclean, Otto Muehl, Naked, Hermann Nitsch, Puppies Puppies, Rudolf Schwarzkogler, Omsk Social Club, Tommy Turner, Anna Uddenberg, David Wojnarowicz, Issy Wood and Katerina Zbortkova.

== Sources ==
- Decline, Yves (3 March 2016) "An interview with Ed Fornieles" atractivoquenobello.
- Herbert, Martin (14 February 2014) "Ed Fornieles, Algorithmic Identities", Mousse, No. 42, Milan.
- Jansen, Charlotte (27 March 2010) "Edward Fornieles explains Performance Art".
- Luke, Ben (21 August 2014) "Virtual family man: Ed Fornieles, artist and former boyfriend of Felicity Jones on 'post-internet' art” Evening Standard, London.
- McNeil, Joanne (2 April 2012) "Artist Profile: Ed Fornieles” Rhizome.
- Obrist, Hans Ulrich (23 January 2012) Theater Basel DLD Conference, "Ways Beyond the Internet", HVB Forum, Munich.
