= DIS (collective) =

New York City art group

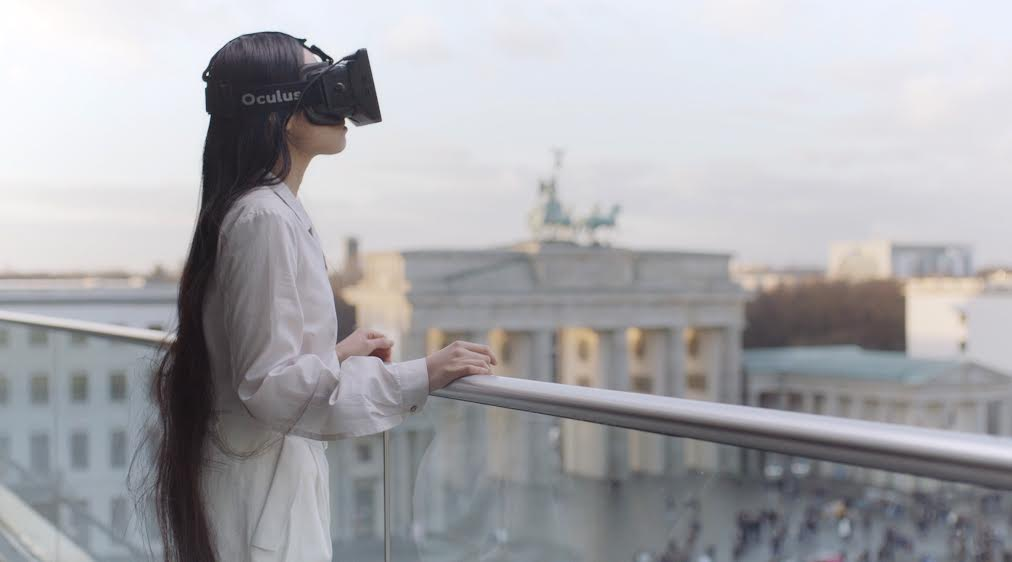
Image from the 9th Berlin Biennale, curated by DIS

DIS is a collaborative project based in New York City. It was founded in 2010 by Lauren Boyle, Solomon Chase, Marco Roso, David Toro, Nick Scholl, Patrik Sandberg and Samuel Adrian Massey, and publishes DIS Magazine, a twist on a lifestyle and fashion magazine. It is now composed of Lauren Boyle, Solomon Chase, Marco Roso and David Toro.

The project's title refers to the prefix dis- ('to do the opposite of') and is meant to reflect an oppositional attitude. DIS is primarily known for their interdisciplinary approach to advertising, fashion, communication and popular culture via the Internet. Critics and audiences have associated them with post-Internet art, though they themselves do not identify with the term, dubbing it ‘a pun with no hope for a conceit’ in one interview.

The project began and evolved from an online, interactive magazine that is a twist on a lifestyle, art and fashion magazine. In addition to the magazine, DIS consists of the platforms DISimages – a project producing new stock imagery – and DISown – a now-closed concept store featuring work by over 30 artists as a laboratory to test the current status of the art object, as well as notions of taste and consumerism.

== Projects ==
=== DIS Magazine ===
DIS Magazine launched in 2010.

The first issue published was the Labor Issue, co-edited with artist Chris Kasper. The magazine proposes an horizontal exploration of culture, offering articles on climate change alongside faux-commercials. The content of the online magazine was organized around categories such as distaste, dystopia, discover, and dysmorphia.

Early content was focused on identifying emerging trends and forecasting potential new ones, from accessorizing with nipple clamps through Z-CoiL shoes and Under Armour sports clothing. Explaining their original interest in fashion they have said ‘If there is a temporality that DIS explores, it is mostly imagined. What is more pertinent to this project is the fact that our generation has a blurred point of view on values and on temporality itself. The past, present, and future—or at least a visually skewed representation of them—are immediately accessible by typing a few keywords into an engine. In this way, reality is multivalent, personal, and constantly in flux. The fashion in DIS is not "high" nor "low." It is simply Medium.’

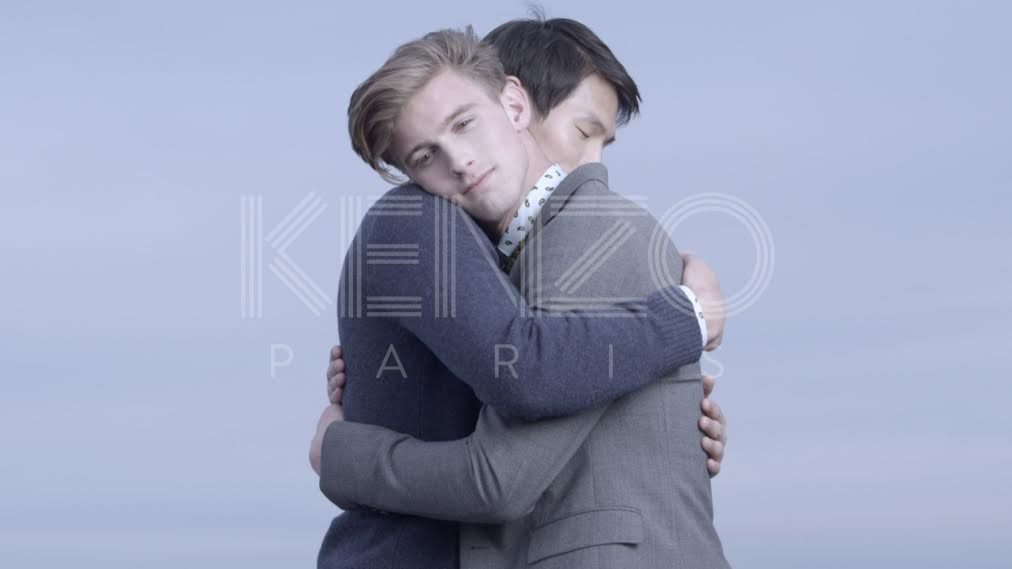
Photo by DIS, 2011. Watermarked for Kenzo

In 2011 they held a Kim Kardashian look-alike contest with MoMA PS1 at Art Basel Miami Beach.

The Art School issue explored the culture of art school and imagined new art school trends. Architect and artist Alessandro Bava guest edited the Disaster issue, which focused on ecology related topics. The Data Issue took as its starting point the rise of so-called "big data", or more broadly the series of shifts associated with the ubiquitous nature of parallel processing, large data sets, and digital networks.

=== DISimages ===
In 2013 DIS established a temporary stock photo studio, DISimages, and invited numerous artists and photographers to participate. DISimages has been described as ‘Shutterstock on ketamine.’ DIS themselves explained that “... stock photographs just perpetuate the same stereotypes over and over again, so we wanted to intercept that and add a few more tags to those weird pictures, to give some more options.”

Artists who contributed to DISimages include Anne de Vries, Ian Cheng, Dora Budor, Maja Cule, Harry Griffin, and Fatima Al-Qadiri.

Shawn Maximo's DISimages project "Confusion is the New Luxury" fused natural landscapes with computer generated images to surreal effect, and Ian Cheng's "3D Models" had virtual human heads reciting commercial programming.

=== DISown ===
In 2014 they created a pop-up store called DISown at Red Bull Studios in New York; according to the press release, "'DISown—Not for Everyone' is an exhibition posing as a retail store. Or maybe it’s the other way around. As Karl Lagerfeld for H&M is a diffusion line for fashion, DISown is a diffusion line for art".

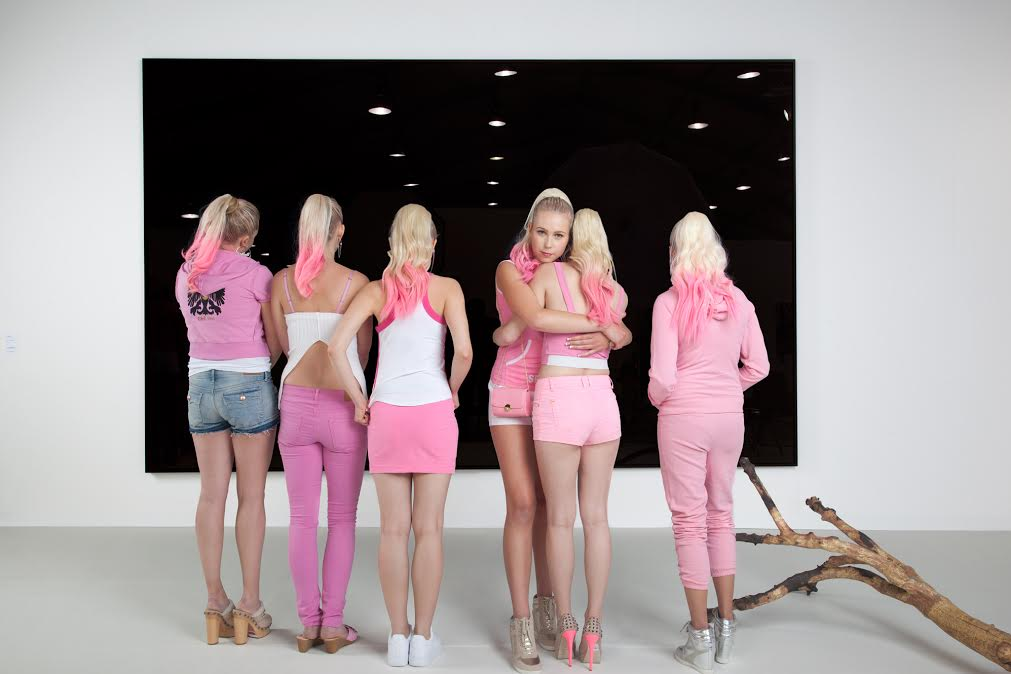
Photo by DIS, 2012. Fair Trade, Frieze Projects 2012

For sale were items such as a mobile trash can and office planter by artist Lizzie Fitch, a salad bowl by Hood By Air and a Maje Cule-designed mirrored folding chair intended to "maximize intern productivity."

Describing the art meets commerce aspect of the venture, Christopher Glazek, wrote “DISown”’s upfront commercialism served then to rebuke artists—including some who participated in the show itself—whose market value relies on presenting their work as somehow outside the market system.”

In 2015, they released a line of Political T-shirts in collaboration with K8 Hardy, Rirkrit Tiravanija, and others. Lauren Boyle described the genesis of the project as such "In our research, we became fascinated with political t-shirt trends, in particular @GOPteens and other right-wing groups," Boyle continued. "Where are the crazy and inspiring progressive t-shirts for our generation? In the grand tradition of commodity activism, we commissioned five artists to design t-shirts that raise awareness. Direct action that's ready-to-wear."

=== dis.art ===
In January 2018, DIS launched an online edutainment channel, dis.art, which streams video pieces for a limited run of 30 days. The launch of the channel was preceded in 2017 by a video installation (Genre-Nonconforming: The DIS Edutainment Network) featuring dis.art's video content along with an avatar character ("The Host") at the de Young Museum. Video projects have been made in collaboration with several partners, including artists Ilana Harris-Babou and Casey Jane Ellison, theorist McKenzie Wark, and filmmakers Jacob Hurwitz-Goodman and Daniel Keller.

== The Berlin Biennale for Contemporary Art ==
In 2016, the 9th Berlin Biennale (June 4—September 18) was curated by DIS. The Biennale title was The Present in Drag and the locations were the Academy of Arts, the European School of Management and Technology, the Kunst-Werke Institute for Contemporary Art, the Feuerle Collection, and a sightseeing boat.

== Selected exhibitions ==
=== Frieze projects ===
In 2012 DIS received a commission from Frieze Art Fair to present a project at their yearly Regent's Park event. The result was a series of images using the galleries and architecture of the Frieze London Art Fair as both a backdrop and subject. The series sought to explore new ways of documenting art in an attention economy, a theme in DIS’ work. The curator, Sarah McCrory, said of their work: "They subvert the very language of fashion, art and advertising, right down to making ugly a compliment.”

=== New Museum Triennial ===
For the 2015 New Museum Triennial, Surround Audience, curated by Lauren Cornell and Ryan Trecartin, DIS produced The Island (KEN), a hybrid kitchen and bath, in collaboration with Dornbracht and co-designed by high end German design studio Meire and Meire. Special “Whet Talks” were held at The Island, as well as regular ‘shower performances’ in which models would demonstrate how The Island was functional by taking showers.

=== Musée d’Art Moderne de la Ville de Paris ===
DIS executed the mise en scene for the Musée d'Art Moderne de la Ville de Paris’s October 2015 exhibition ‘Co-Workers, Network as Artist’, curated by Angeline Scherf, Toke Lykkeberg and Jessica Castex. To design the exhibition, DIS was inspired by collective work spaces, shopping malls, and airport transit areas. They also showed The Island (KEN) in a new installation commissioned specifically for the exhibition.

=== MoMA ===
In 2015, MoMA commissioned DIS to create new work for their 30th bi-annual New Photography exhibition, this time titled Ocean of Images and promising to probing the effects of an image-based post-Internet reality. They were also invited to produce the advertising campaign for the show, which starred Conchita Wurst, the Austrian singer and drag queen who became famous overnight after winning Eurovision 2014. She is pictured speaking at a lectern with teleprompters at her side, eliciting questions about celebrity, identity, and image making. For the first time, DIS turned the MoMA logo into a watermark.

=== Project Native Informant ===
In 2016, DIS put on a solo show, Image Life, at Project Native Informant, a London gallery whom they are also represented by.
