= Fornieles =

Fornieles is a surname. Notable people with the surname include:

- Ed Fornieles (born 1983), British artist
- Mike Fornieles (1932–1998), American baseball player
