= It's Effin' Science =

Television series

- Genre: Nonfiction; Science
- Starring: Angie Greenup; Marc Horowitz; Chad Zdenek
- Country of origin: United States
- Original language: English
- No. of seasons: 1
- No. of episodes: 10

Production
- Running time: 22 minutes

Original release
- Network: G4
- Release: June 15 – September 7, 2010

It's Effin' Science is an American television show on G4. It was hosted by Angie Greenup, Marc Horowitz and Chad Zdenek and produced by Renegade Productions. Filming was based in Los Angeles, California and 10 episodes were ordered for the first season. The series premiered on June 15, 2010.

== About ==
The series is a spin-off from a segment of another G4 series, Attack of the Show!. The series explored the weird, wild and off-beat side of science. The show featured the hosts creating and demonstrating experiments that the everyday person could attempt themselves. Experiments can be over-the-top, like turning a pool party into a massive game of Battleship, or simple combinations of everyday objects and science basics that can help the viewer win bar bets you can't lose or build gadgets like homemade night vision goggles. The series' tagline stated: "A full-on hack of science".

== Background ==
Before filming started, the crew met for the first time in February 2010, at a Six Flags park. "They kind of forced us to bond because they didn't want us to meet for the first time in front of the cameras", said Horowitz. "So we pretended it was Angie's birthday, without telling her of course." The staff of the theme park serenaded a confused Greenup with "Happy Birthday".

G4 knew Greenup from Renegade Productions, Horowitz from previous auditions, and Zdenek as the engineer and "destruction consultant" from Human Wrecking Balls.

== Hosts ==
- Angie Greenup: The Host
- Marc Horowitz: The Guinea Pig
- Chad Zdenek: The Science Guy

== Episode guide ==
=== Season 1 ===
Episode number	Original airdate	Challenge
1-1	15 Jun 10	Hosts build a potato cannon, test pheromones at a pool party, and bar bets you can't lose.
1-2	22 Jun 10	Hosts launch a porta-potty 100 feet in the air using sugar rockets, homemade vehicle anti-theft experiments, and drunk driving vs text driving.
1-3	29 Jun 10	Hosts test which is more dangerous: a bullet or a chicken fired from a cannon; three ways to crack a safe; and cool living room gadgets.
1-4	27 Jul 10	Hosts test a rocket-powered skateboard, 3 different types of sonic boom and solar powered gadgets.
1-5	3 Aug 10	The team hacks science to implode a tanker. Plus, Marc and Chad walk on a non-Newtonian liquid.
1-6	10 Aug 10	Three different types of explosions are created: Combustion, Deflagration & Detonation. Plus, Marc scales the side of a building using only a vacuum cleaner.
1-7	17 Aug 10	The team recreates the Hindenburg explosion, Marc plays with static electricity and they send a dummy into space.
1-8	24 Aug 10	The effin'team builds homemade fireworks, burning magnesium, rainbow fireballs, Marc lights his farts and more bar bets you can't lose.
1-9	31 Aug 10	The team builds a fire hose jet pack, create a homemade volcano, have fun in the bathroom and even more "Bets You Can't Lose".
1-10	7 Sep 10	On the season finale, the team launches a refrigerator and builds the world's fastest shopping cart.
