= Melissa Broder =

American author, essayist and poet

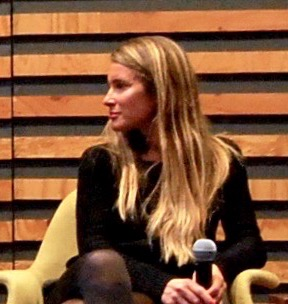
- Broder in New York City in 2017
- Born: August 29, 1979 (age 46)
- Education: Tufts University (BA); City College of New York (MFA)
- Occupations: Author; essayist; poet
- Notable work: So Sad Today, The Pisces, Last Sext, Milk Fed
- Awards: Pushcart Prize
- Website: melissabroder.com

Melissa Broder (born August 29, 1979) is an American author, essayist and poet. Her work includes the novels The Pisces (Penguin Random House 2018), Milk Fed (Simon & Schuster 2021), and Death Valley (Scribner, 2023); the poetry collection Last Sext (Tin House 2016); and the essay collection So Sad Today (Grand Central 2016). Broder has written for The New York Times, Elle, Vice, Vogue Italia, and The Cut.

== Early life ==
Broder grew up in Bryn Mawr, Pennsylvania, with her younger sister Hayley. Her father, Bob, was a tax lawyer and her mother owned a stationery store. She attended the Baldwin School and became interested in poetry early, writing her first collection in third grade.

Broder attended Tufts University, where she edited the literary magazine Queen's Head and Artichoke. She graduated in 2001 with a degree in English and then moved to San Francisco, where she worked odd jobs before relocating to New York City at 25. There she worked as a publicist for Penguin Books and attended night classes at City College of New York, earning an MFA in poetry.

Broder has been clean and sober since age 25.

== Career ==
=== Poetry ===
Broder has published five collections of poetry, including Superdoom (2021). She won a Pushcart Prize for the poem "Forgotten Sound", included in her collection Last Sext.

=== So Sad Today ===
Broder began tweeting anonymously from her So Sad Today Twitter account in 2012. She began her So Sad Today column for Vice in December 2014. She revealed herself as the account's author in a Rolling Stone interview in May 2015.

In 2016, Broder published a collection of personal essays, So Sad Today, based on her Twitter account. The collection includes some essays initially published in Vice under her So Sad Today pen name.

=== The Pisces ===
In 2018 Broder published the novel The Pisces, which garnered praise from The New York Times, The New Yorker, Vogue, and The Washington Post.

Broder is adapting The Pisces for Lionsgate Films.

=== Milk Fed ===
In 2021, Broder published Milk Fed, a critically acclaimed novel that Kirkus Reviews called "[b]old, dry, and delightfully dirty."

In 2020 it was announced that a television show based on Milk Fed was being developed.

=== Other projects ===
She also writes the Beauty and Death column for Elle.

Broder records a podcast titled eating alone in my car in which she discusses her work, daily life, obsessions, and "rants about everything from mortality to Poptarts to depression."

== Personal life ==
Broder is married and lives in Los Angeles. She is a caregiver for her husband, who has a progressive neuroimmune disease that leaves him bedridden for months at a time. She is bisexual.

== Bibliography ==
=== Poetry ===
- When You Say One Thing But Mean Your Mother (Ampersand Books, 2010)
- Meat Heart (Publishing Genius, 2012)
- Scarecrone (Publishing Genius, 2014)
- Dust Moan (NewHive, 2014)
- Last Sext (Tin House, 2016)
- Superdoom (Tin House, 2021)

=== Essay collection ===
- So Sad Today (Grand Central, 2016)

=== Novels ===
- The Pisces (Penguin Random House, 2018)
- Milk Fed (Simon & Schuster, 2021)
- Death Valley (Simon and Schuster, 2023)

As contributor

- The Ampersand, Vol. 4 (Ampersand Books, 2009)
- Stoked V (2013)
- Poetry Magazine, December 2014 (Poetry Foundation, 2014)
- Keep This Bag Away from Children 2
- The Hour of the Star (narrator, 2017)
- Through Clenched Teeth (Triangle House, 2018)
- Regiment of Women (afterword, Modern Library, 2023)
- The Princess of 72nd Street (introduction, Random House, 2024)
