= Jonathan Monaghan =

American animator and artist

- Born: September 14, 1986 (age 39); Rockaway Beach, Queens, New York, U.S.
- Education: New York Institute of Technology; University of Maryland
- Style: Video art
- Movement: Post-Internet
- Website: Jonathanmonaghan.com

Jonathan Monaghan (born September 14, 1986 in Rockaway Beach, Queens, New York) is a contemporary visual artist who creates sculptures, prints, and video art with 3D modeling and animation software.

== Biography ==
Monaghan received his B.F.A. in computer graphics from the New York Institute of Technology in 2008. Monaghan then went on to receive a M.F.A. from the University of Maryland.

== Work ==
Monaghan's animations have been exhibited at the Sundance Film Festival and the Palais de Tokyo. Monaghan's work sits in numerous public and private collections such as The DC Commission on the Arts and Humanities and The Crystal Bridges Museum of American Art.

As he stated, "My first artistic interests were [...] video game designers and science fiction movies". His work Sacrifice of the Mushroom Kings is an eight-minute video of cryptic reproductions of video games characters from Street Fighter, G.I. Joe and Super Mario Bros. He created the French penguin (2009), an "absurd and sad representation of power as a slave of itself"; Rainbow Narcosis (2012), a "journey through absurd worlds, loaded with historical and artistic references"; and Robot Ninja (2013), where "the environments become abstract and the spirit more masculine, almost macho".

According to Token Supremacy: The Art of Finance, the Finance of Art, and the Great Crypto Crash of 2022, by Zachary Small, Monaghan created what is arguably the first NFT in 2013, when he processed the editions of his digital artwork 'Mothership' through the first iteration of a bitcoin blockchain registration framework called Keidom, later ascribe. In 2017, he released a series of digital futuristic Fabergé eggs.

Monaghan is represented by bitforms gallery in New York.

== Exhibitions ==
=== Solo ===
- 2015:Escape Pod, bitforms gallery, New York
- 2016: Gotham, Galerie 22,48m², Paris
- 2017: Disco Beast, bitforms gallery, New York
- 2017: After Fabergé, The Walters Art Museum, Baltimore
- 2020: Out of the Abyss, Spring/Break Art Show, New York
- 2021: Den of Wolves, bitforms gallery, New York
- 2022: Move the Way you Want, The Phillips Collection, Washington D.C.

=== Select screenings ===
- LOOP Barcelona, Barcelona, Spain
- Sundance Film Festival, Park City, UT
- Hirshhorn Museum - "Experimental Media Series" Washington D.C.
- International Film Festival Rotterdam, Rotterdam, Netherlands

== See also ==
- Matthew Barney
