= Tara Downs =

Canadian artist

Tara Downs is a Canadian artist who jointly owns and operates the Downs & Ross gallery in New York City. She previously was a founder and director of the Tomorrow Gallery in Toronto and later relocated to New York City.

== Career ==
In 2011, Downs founded the Tomorrow Gallery with Aleksander Hardashnakov and Hugh Scott-Douglas in a Toronto warehouse that had previously housed a paintball studio. From 2011 through 2013, the gallery "became a notable hub for emerging artists from Europe and North America," according to Nick Irwin of ArtNews, and provided early opportunities for artists such as Joshua Abelow, Sebastian Black, and Brad Troemel, as well as Dena Yago, Parker Ito, and Kelly Akashi.

In 2014, Downs relocated the Tomorrow Gallery to New York City as the sole proprietor, and featured artists such as Bradley Kronz, Jason Matthew Lee, Mary Ann Aitken, Oto Gillen and Valerie Keane. The first show was titled "Eternal September," which Downs explained is a term created by Usenet members to refer to what happened after September 1993, when AOL ended the practice of only opening access to Usenet annually during the start of the academic year in September, "exploding the community’s population and inaugurating the current climate of endless, continuous expansion of the Internet." She also moved to Berlin for a position as associate director at Tanya Leighton Gallery, while continuing to direct the Tomorrow Gallery, before returning to New York.

In 2017, Downs merged the Tomorrow Gallery with Hester, by Alex Ross, to create the Downs & Ross Gallery in New York City. Casey Lesser of Artsy described the galleries as having "complementary programs," writing that both "are heavy on international artists, curate with an eye towards history, and aim to resurface under-represented artists." Artists shown by Downs & Ross include Brad Troemel, Sojourner Truth Parsons, Ben Schumacher, Vikky Aleksander, Andrea Crespo, and Yanyan Huang, as well as Carlos Reyes, Louisa Gagliardi, Tom Waring, Rute Merk, Egan Frantz, Catherine Mulligan, and Ragna Bley.

Downs & Ross has participated in a variety of art fairs, including Frieze New York Online (2021), Independent Art Fair (2020), NADA Miami Beach (2019), Frieze New York (2019), The Armory Show (2019, 2018, 2017), Art Los Angeles Contemporary (2019), Art Toronto (2018), and FIAC (2018, 2017).

== Education ==
Downs graduated from Queens University with a Bachelor of Arts and completed her Master of Fine Arts at OCAD University in Sculpture and Installation.
