= Hurvin =

Hurvin is a given name. Notable people with the given name include:

- Hurvin Anderson (born 1965), British painter
- Hurvin McCormack (born 1972), American football player
