= Rachel de Joode =

Dutch artist

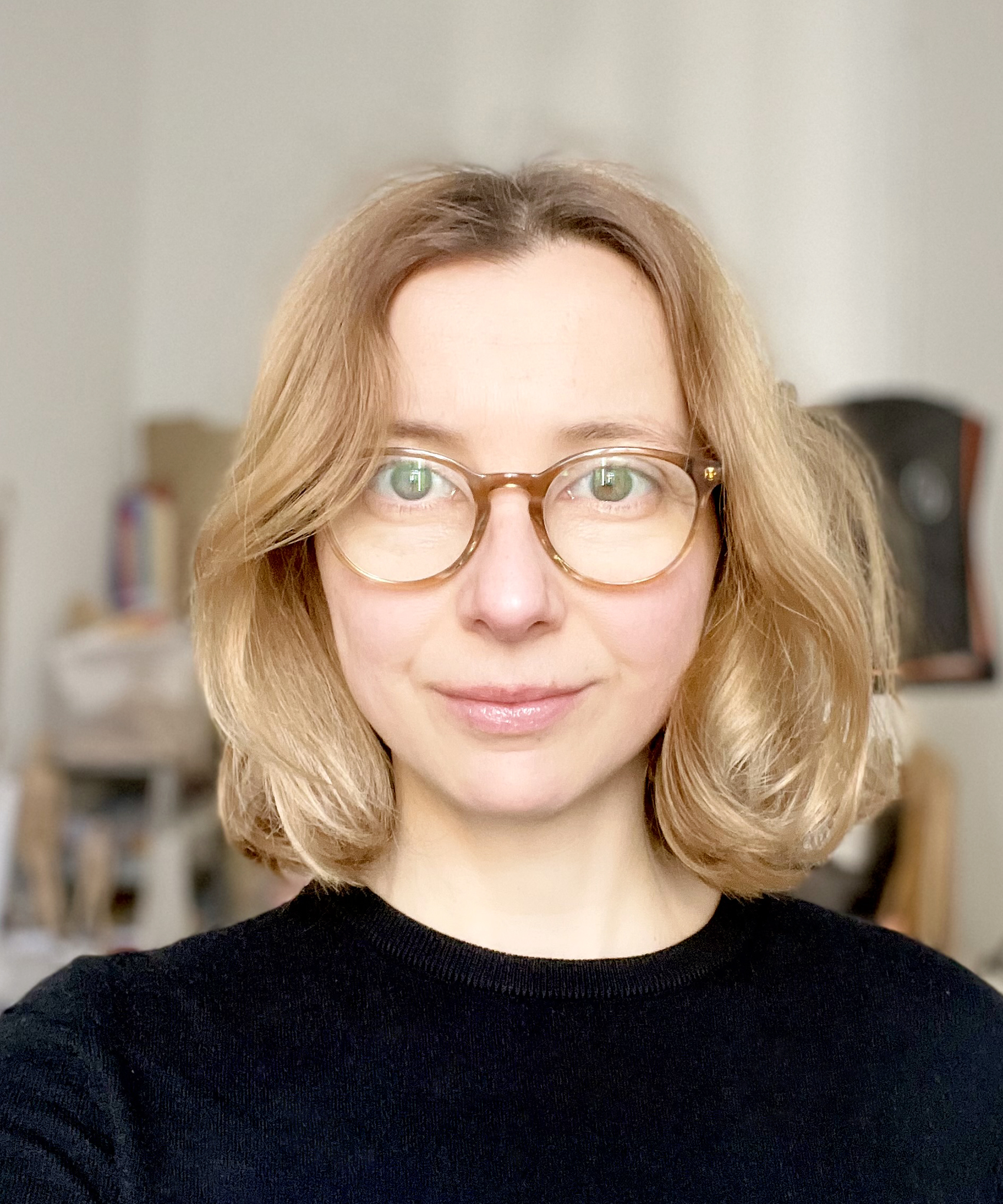
- Rachel de Joode in her studio in Berlin, 2021
- Born: 1979 (age 46–47); Amersfoort, Netherlands
- Occupation: Artist
- Movement: Photography, sculpture, installation art, new media art post-internet

Rachel de Joode (born 1979) is a Berlin-based sculptor, photographer, and installation artist.

== Early life and education ==
Rachel de Joode studied art at the Academy of Art and Design St. Joost in Breda and time-based arts at the Gerrit Rietveld Academie in Amsterdam.

== Work ==
After graduating, de Joode began working with photographs and short films that eventually evolved into sculptures that blurred the line between digital representation and an object. De Joode's work can be seen as a version of ephemeral reality, a surface or texture that can be seen as tactile but not felt because what appear to be sculptural materials are photographs. When she chooses to combine these photographs with actual materials, the illusion is magnified and a new form of naturalness is created as product of the artificial and the physical.

Images of de Joode's collaboration with Donna Huanca began circulating on internet in 2010. Conjunction was an interpretation of an astrological event that involved two performers moving through an installation as if practicing some forgotten ritual. De Joode's interest in the relationship between photography, physical reality and illusion appear in the documentation of the installation/performance. De Joode said that the internet influenced her in the way she perceives and processes visual images. For her, the photograph becomes a tool for the mediation of physical experience with matter. In effect, the networked documentation of an image becomes the artwork.

In her 2016 exhibition at Galerie Christophe Gaillard in Paris, de Joode explored the relationship between, photography, internet and her sculptural objects. A self-taught sculptor, de Joode had started working in three dimensions by making still lifes, photographing and arranging objects and thinking about the semiotics of objects. At a certain point de Joode stopped photographing her "things" (a manner she chooses to identify her work to avoid categorization) and started thinking of the art gallery as a stage that was meant to be photographed, documented and distributed through internet.

In the exhibition Instead of Pieces, a Play, (Galerie Christophe Gaillard, Paris, 2018), de Joode, now as an artist protagonist sets up a stage in the middle of the gallery with actors dressed as artists presenting the exhibits. On the double walls hang small ceramic nude figurines representing the artist while anonymous arms pierce the walls to hold sculptural objects. The whole combines literal performance with virtual and real textures and photographic assemblages.

De Joode's Museum exhibitions include Myths of the Marble (2017) at Institute of Contemporary Art, Philadelphia (ICA) and Henie Onstad Kunstsenter, Oslo, Rachel de Joode, Flat Nature / Surface Bodies (2017) Fort Vijfhuizen, Amsterdam, Gestures of Tomorrow (2016) at Kunstverein Nürnberg and Metabolism (2015) at Museo d’Arte Contemporanea, Rome

== Bibliography ==
- Artviewer (18 May 2015) "Rachel de Joode at Neumeister Bar-Am" Art Viewer Rachel de Joode at Neumeister Bar-Am – Art Viewer(retrieved 9 March 2020)
- Canbaz, Melissa (2014) "Rachel de Joode" Artforum Neumeister Bar-Am(retrieved 8 March 2020)
- Cordray, Julianne (29 July 2016) "Nature // The Semiotics of Surface: An Interview with Rachel de Joode" Berlinartlink Nature // The Semiotics of Surface: An Interview with Rachel de Joode(retrieved 8 March 2020)
- Cotton, Charlotte ed. (2015) Photography Is Magic New York: Aperture
- Dandini de Sylva, Alessandro "Rachel de Joode: Metabolism" Fotographia XIVFOTOGRAFIA | Rachel de Joode: Metabolism(retrieved 10 March 2020)
- Dessent, Blaire (27 October 2015) "Rachel de Joode’s Fleshy Artworks Mesh Sculpture and Photography" Artsy Rachel de Joode’s Fleshy Artworks Mesh Sculpture and Photography(retrieved 8 March 2020)
- "Donna Huanca and Rachel De Joode, Conjunction" Highlike DONNA HUANCA AND RACHEL DE JOODE(retrieved 9 March 2020)
- Drumm, Rerrin (2 April 2012) "Rachel De Joode, The Magic-surreal, Inflatable Neo-Dada Work of a Still Life Sculptor" Coolhunting Rachel de Joode (retrieved 9 March 2020)
- Elders, Zippora (6 November 2015) "Interview with Rachel De Joode" Foam Interview with Rachel de Joode(retrieved 8 March 2020)
- Folks, Eva (28 August 2015) "Rachel de Joode, Soft Inquiry (2015) exhibition photos" AQNB Rachel de Joode, Soft Inquiry (2015) exhibition photos(retrieved 8 March 2020)
- Gavoyannis, Olivia (11 November 2020) "'Instagram makes you feel part of the art world—but it's a lie': artist Rachel de Joode on art and the digital" The Art Newspaper 'Instagram makes you feel part of the art world—but it's a lie': artist Rachel de Joode on art and the digital(retrieved 25 March 2021)
- Hoegsberg, Milena and Klein, Alex (2018) Myths of the Marble Berlin: Sternberg Press
- Hutchens, Jessyca (16 August 2011) "Rachel de Joode" Berlinartlink RACHEL DE JOODE(retrieved 9 March 2020)
- Jordan, Marvin (2014) "Steciw and de Joode | Open for Business" dismagazine Steciw and de Joode | Open for Business(retrieved 8 March 2020)
- Klein, Alex (9 June 2018) "Exposition Solo Show : Rachel de JOODE « Instead of Pieces, a Play »" Actuart Exposition Solo Show : Rachel de JOODE « Instead of Pieces, a Play »(retrieved 8 March 2020)
- LVL3 (19 July 2011) "Artist of the Week: Rachel de Joode" LVL3 Gallery, Chicago Artist of the Week: Rachel de Joode (retrieved 9 March 2020)
- Mallett, Whitney (2014) "Rachel De Joode" Editorial MagazineIssue 9 Rachel de Joode – The Editorial Magazine(retrieved 9 March 2020)
- Mousse Magazine (2014) "Rachel de Joode 'The Molten Inner Core' at Neumeister Bar-Am, Berlin" Mousse Magazine Rachel de Joode "The Molten Inner Core" at Neumeister Bar-Am, Berlin •(retrieved 8 March 2020)
- ofluxone (19 November 2015) "Porosity by Rachel de Joode @ Galerie Christophe Gaillard" Fluxo Porosity by Rachel de Joode @ Galerie Christophe Gaillard(retrieved 8 March 2020)
- ofluxone (23 October 2017)"Flat Nature / Surface Bodies by Rachel de Joode at Kunstfort bij Vijfhuizen" Fluxo Flat Nature / Surface Bodies by Rachel de Joode at Kunstfort bij Vijfhuizen(retrieved 10 March 2020)
- Pernet, Diane (13 July 2010) "Invitation to Live Sculptural Spectacle ???????? Conjunction???????? by Donna Huanca and Rachel de Joode" A Shaded View on Fashion INVITATION to LIVE SCULPTURAL SPECTACLE ? ? ? ? ? ? ? ? CONJUNCTION? ? ? ? ? ? ? ? by Donna Huanca and Rachel de Joode Thursday, 15th of JULY 2010, opens: 20:00 PERFORMANCE: 20:20 and 21:00 starring: Helga Wretman and Ta(retrieved 9 March 2020)
- "Rachel De Joode on her Transcendent Sculptures and Not Being an Artist" Material Magazine #32 Spring/Summer 2017 RACHEL DE JOODE ON HER TRANSCENDENT SCULPTURES(retrieved 9 March 2020)
- Rakowski, Kelly (5 March 2013) "Rachel de Joode, Artist" Sight Unseen Rachel de Joode, Artist (retrieved 9 March 2020)
- Tique (12 February 2018) "Six Questions: Rachel de Joode" TiqueSix Questions: Rachel de Joode(retrieved 9 March 2020)
- Venturi, Riccardo (January 2016) "Rachel de Joode
- GALERIE CHRISTOPHE GAILLARD" Artforum New York
- Verni, Charles (2014) Rachel de Joode Akoya Books Rachel De Joode(retrieved 10 March 2020)
