= Galerie Michael Werner =

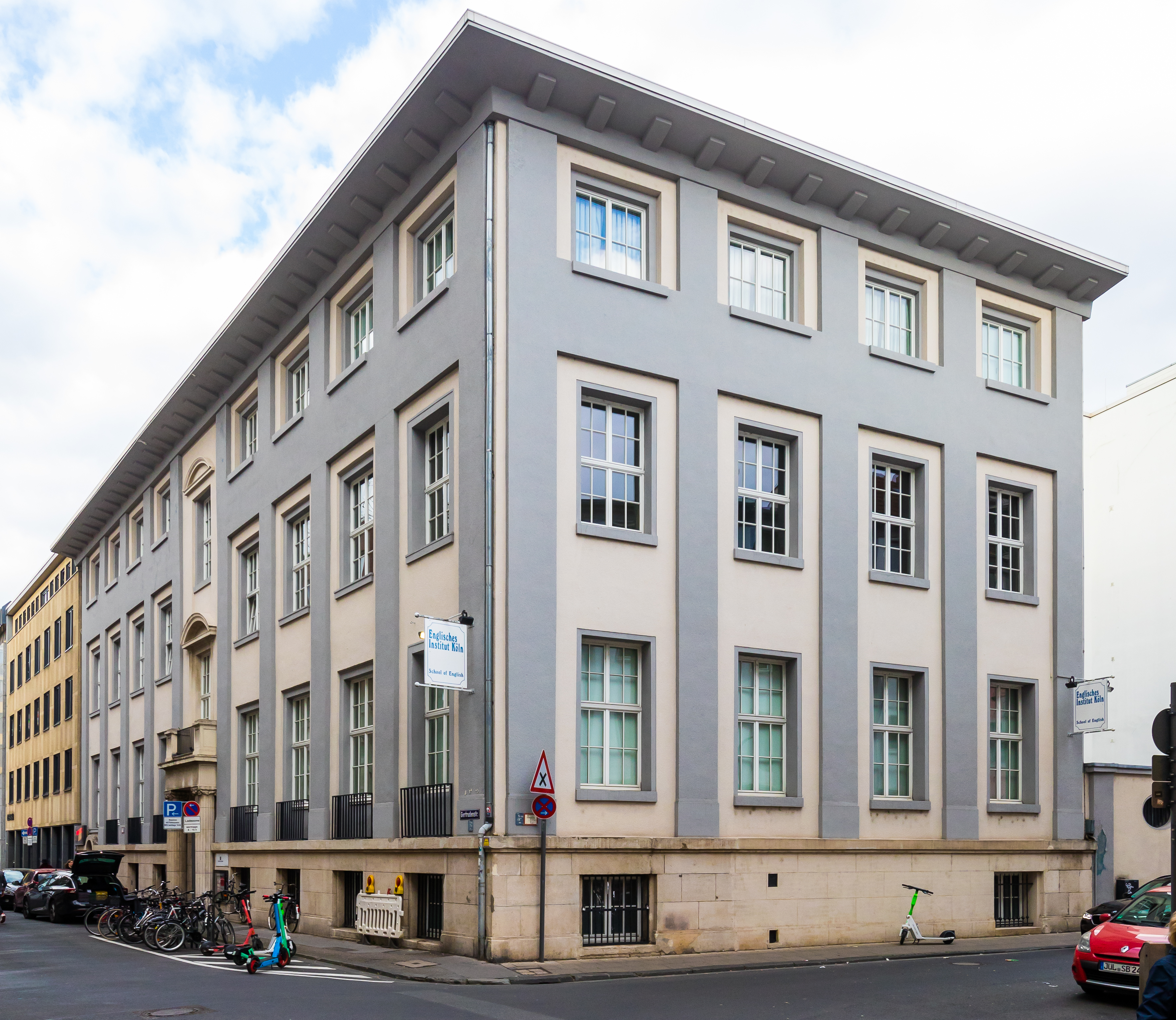
- Gertrudenstraße 24–28, Cologne
- Predecessor: Werner & Katz; Galerie Hake
- Formation: 1969
- Purpose: art gallery
- Headquarters: Gertrudenstraße 24
- Location: Cologne, Germany
- Coordinates: 50.9381°N 6.9458°E
- Key people: Michael Werner; Gordon VeneKlasen
- Website: michaelwerner.com

In 1963, Michael Werner opened his first gallery, Werner & Katz, in Berlin, Germany with the first solo exhibition of Georg Baselitz. Galerie Michael Werner was later established in Cologne in 1969. Since then, Galerie Michael Werner has worked with several of the most important artists of the twentieth century.

== History ==
When he opened his own gallery in 1963, Michael Werner gave Georg Baselitz his first solo show.

A branch was opened in New York City in 1990, in a house on East 77th Street formerly used by Leo Castelli, and re-designed by Annabelle Selldorf. In 1997, the gallery entered into a partnership with Knoedler.

In 2009, Michael Werner and Gordon Veneklasen opened an art, film and performance space called VW (Veneklasen/Werner) in Berlin. The space closed in 2016. A London branch with 230 m^{2} (2,500 sq ft) of exhibition space opened in 2012 in Upper Brook Street, Mayfair; the first show was of work by Peter Doig.

In 2017 the gallery collaborated with a Brazilian gallery, Mendes Wood DM, to open Hic Svnt Dracones, a project space on East 66th Street in New York. In 2022, the gallery briefly operated a pop-up space at a former Warby Parker glasses store in downtown East Hampton.

In October 2023, Michael Werner Gallery collaborated with the late James Lee Byars for an exhibition at Pirelli HangarBicocca in Milan, featuring striking gold-themed installations, including a 21-meter tall golden pillar, showcasing Byars' unique artistic vision and Werner's dedication to presenting monumental art.

== Artists ==
Galerie Michael Werner represents numerous artists, including:

- Kai Althoff
- Hurvin Anderson
- Aaron Curry
- Markus Lüpertz
- Peter Saul (since 2019)
- Issy Wood

In addition, the gallery manages various artist estates, including:

- Marcel Broodthaers
- James Lee Byars
- Jörg Immendorff
- Per Kirkeby
- Ernst Wilhelm Nay
- A.R. Penck
- Sigmar Polke

In the past, the gallery has worked with the following artists and estates:

- Georg Baselitz
- Peter Doig (2000–2023)
- Thomas Houseago
- Anselm Kiefer (−1979)
- Tomas Schmit

== Recognition ==
In 2017 Michael Werner became a chevalier of the Legion of Honour, in recognition of his contributions to French culture, which included the donation of 130 artworks to the Musée d’Art Moderne de la Ville de Paris.

== Legal issues ==
From 2011, Galerie Michael Werner launched a $1.35 million legal dispute with the Gwangju Biennale and the biennial's insurance company in a South Korean court over three onyx sculptures by James Lee Byars; the works were lent by the gallery for the 2010 biennial and were damaged during removal after the show and in transit back from South Korea.
