= Kunstverein Nürnberg =

Coordinates: 49.449714°N 11.098144°E

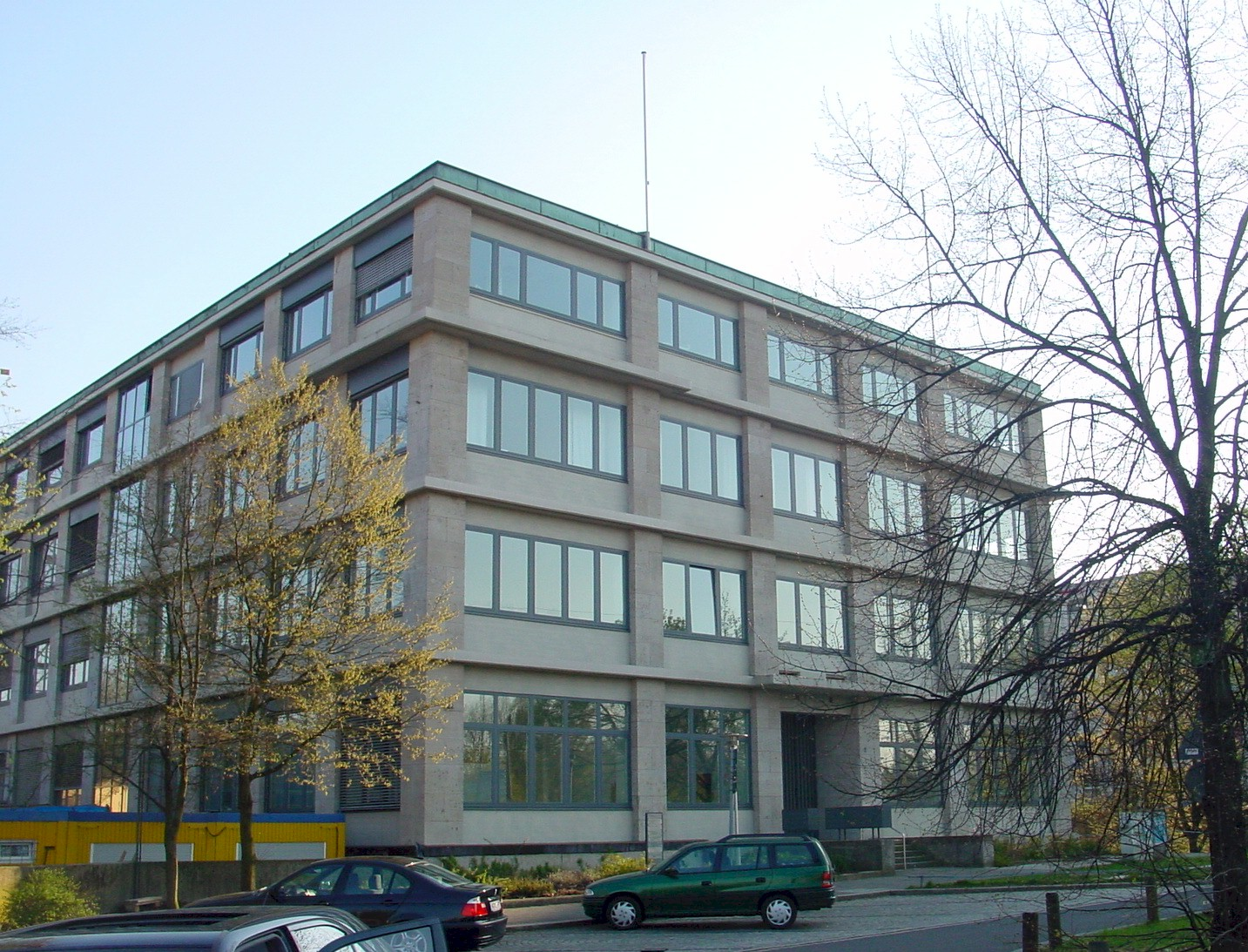
Milchhof (O.E.Schweizer), where the exhibition rooms of the Kunstverein are situated

The Kunstverein Nürnberg (art association Nuremberg, official name "Kunstverein Nürnberg - Albrecht Dürer Gesellschaft e.V.") is a venue for exhibitions of contemporary art. The association was founded in 1792 and is Germany's oldest arts association.

The association's exhibition space is situated in a building designed 1930 by architect Otto Ernst Schweizer, well known for buildings such as the Ernst-Happel-Stadion.

The gallery shows a wide range of international contemporary artistic positions.

Past exhibitions (selection):

- 2015 Transparencies - Neil Beloufa, Juliette Blightman, Ryan Gander, Calla Henkel & Max Pitegoff, David Horvitz, Metahaven, Katja Novitskova and Yuri Pattison
- 2011 Phyllida Barlow - Cast
- 2010 Shahryar Nashat - Line up
