= Molly Soda =

Performance artist

- Born: San Juan, Puerto Rico
- Occupation: Artist
- Movement: Video art, performance art, photography, new media art, Post-Internet

Amalia Soto, known as Molly Soda, is a Brooklyn-based internet performance artist. Soda works across a variety of digital platforms, producing selfies videos, GIFs, zines, and web-based performance art, which are presented both online and in gallery installations in a variety of forms. Molly Soda's work explores the technological mediation of self-concept, contemporary feminism, cyberfeminism, mass media and popular social media culture. Molly Soda is the co-editor with Arvida Byström of the 2017 book Pics or It Didn't Happen: Images Banned from Instagram.

== Biography ==
Born in San Juan, Puerto Rico, Molly Soda grew up in Bloomington, Indiana. Soda studied photography and Imaging Tisch School of the Arts in New York City, graduating with a BFA in 2011. Soda cites performance artists such as Marina Abramović and Carolee Schneeman as artistic influences. Since 2011, Molly Soda has worked out of Chicago, Detroit and New York.

== Celebrity ==
Molly Soda started blogging as a teenager. In the late 2000s, her Tumblr blog began to attract attention beyond the Tumblr sphere, gaining notoriety on the site and on wider social media platforms. She became an iconic micro-celebrity, known for teen confessions-style art and for her widely imitated personal aesthetic in multiple online subcultures. In 2011, she was involved in the emergence of seapunk microculture, and became an occasional back-up dancer for techno-pop musician Grimes.

== Work ==
Molly Soda was first recognized for her college senior thesis, Tween Dreams, The work is a YouTube video series, later released on VHS, about a group of preteen friends growing up in the suburbs and living the drama of high school dances, chatroom fights, and meeting boys at the mall in the 2000s. Soda was the only actress in the work and played every character.

Soda's 2013 webcam video Inbox Full was presented at the Tumblr digital art auction organized by curator Lindsay Howard. Inbox Full is a ten-hour-long endurance performance and video piece, "in which she dictates every absurd message in her Tumblr inbox. Her transparent self-presentation is refreshing amongst tediously-curated online personalities".

In 2015, as part of an ongoing art project, Should I Send This?, Molly Soda leaked her own nude selfies, expressing that "Women SHOULD be feeling themselves…SHOULD be taking control of the way they are represented in media/art by photographing themselves".

Soda's Virtual Spellbook (2015) on the internet platform NewHive addresses agency within technology at the same time as making fun of the traditionally female perspective of Wicca, by providing a series of interactive spells to deal with technology.

In her 2015 work, From My Bedroom to Yours, Soda combined Tumblr aesthetic, kitsch and internet culture within a confessional space that reflected her own bedroom/studio to demonstrate her vulnerability. Soda designed the gallery to look like a private space, treating a physical gallery space differently than her on line presence, as if people somehow take things more seriously in real life. With From My Bedroom to Yours, Soda "combined 'tween Tumblr aesthetic', kitsch and 'lowbrow internet culture' with a kind of 'unmade-but-made confessionalism' to create intimacy through the recreation of Soda's own bedroom within the walls of the gallery".

Molly Soda has exhibited both in the United States and Internationally with solo exhibitions in New York (Jack Barrett), Los Angeles (Leiminspace), Bloomington (Breezeway Gallery) and London, England (Annka Kultys Gallery). Molly Soda, in an augmented reality project in collaboration with Nicole Ruggiero and the Berlin collective Refrakt, was awarded the 2017 Lumen Founders' Prize.

== See also ==
- Post-Internet
