= Brad Troemel =

American artist

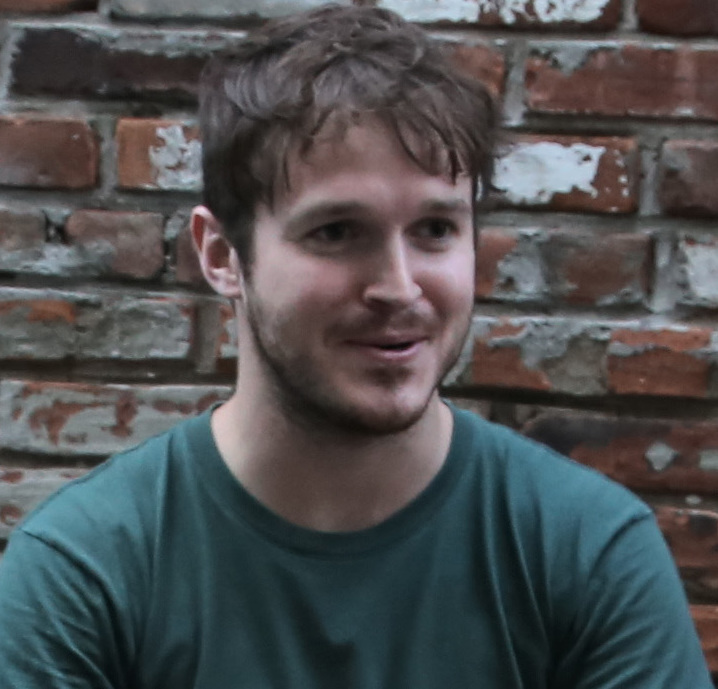
- Troemel in 2014
- Born: 1987 (age 38–39)
- Website: bradtroemel.com

Brad Troemel (born 1987) is an American artist and writer based in New York City. Troemel is most well known for co-creating the Tumblr blog The Jogging in 2009 which received attention for its work in post internet art.

A self-described "emphatic disruptor", The New Yorker has described his work as “a jab at the rigid rules of the art world and an experiment in what art might look like if those rules didn’t exist.”

== Education ==
Troemel received a BA in Visual and Critical Studies from the School of the Art Institute of Chicago. For his thesis, he wrote a twenty-page essay titled "Free Art" which used arguments by Wired editor Chris Anderson to envision a radical techno-libertarian conception of how the Internet can circumvent the traditional art world. He received an MFA from New York University NYU Steinhardt.

== Career ==
In 2008, Troemel opened the Chicago-based art gallery Scott Projects.

Starting in 2009, Troemel, along with artist Lauren Christiansen, began digitally compositing images that depicted irreverent installation scenes and sculptures on the Tumblr blog The Jogging. Jogging concluded with months of polarizing conspiracy images made by Troemel and the artist Edward Shenk, what critic Zachary Kaplan called "a body of image macros that took on the look and feel of Truther and right-wing, anti-Obama propaganda while simultaneously subverting it through absurdist content."

In 2011, Troemel began a series of exhibitions with his use of Bitcoin and the Silk Road black market. For the exhibition "The Social Life of Things" in Rotterdam, Troemel used a number of objects from the marketplace including a fake ID containing his real details and picture, bump keys and psychedelic drug seeds which were presented in an installation. Those objects were presented for free to be further used by visitors and Troemel himself used Silk Road-purchased identification to travel from New York to Rotterdam for the exhibition.

In 2012, Troemel launched an Etsy store primarily featuring temporary food sculptures designed to fall apart during their shipment through the postal service.

His early work was exhibited at the Tomorrow Gallery, run by Tara Downs.

Troemel's 2014 exhibition Live/Work at Tomorrow Gallery featured a series of hanging colored ant tanks, each representing a different trio of charities. The run of the exhibition served as a competition between the various ant tanks to see which could most productively dig the most tunnels, earning the charity that the ants represented 10% of the exhibitions' proceeds.

In 2015, Troemel partnered with Joshua Citarella, a former collaborator from Jogging, to create UV Production House, an Etsy store providing material kits and fabrication guidance to collectors for all-original works. In 2016 exhibition "Freecaching", Troemel concealed his entire studio inventory in Central Park and presented GPS coordinates as magnetic puzzle certificates of authenticity at Tomorrow Gallery. He described, the exhibition was meant to be a proof of concept for discretely utilizing public space as a sharing economy art storage business model.

In early 2020, Troemel released a mock "advertisement" for the Joe Biden campaign captioned, "His brain? No, his heart." The satirical piece went viral and was shared by both left-and right-wing users who were not always aware of its original intent. The piece was later taken down by Twitter and other platforms as fake news.
