= Kai Althoff =

German visual artist and musician

- Born: February 1966 (age 60); Cologne
- Style: Multimedia art

Kai Althoff (born 1966 in Cologne) is a German visual artist, painter, and musician.

== Life and work ==
Kai Althoff was born in Cologne, West Germany, in February 1966. Althoff has been a long-time friend with Michael Karoli, a member of Cologne krautrock band Can, visiting the Can Studio when he was seven years old.

Borrowing from moments of history, religious iconography, and counter-cultural movements, Althoff has been creating imaginary environments in which paintings, sculpture, drawing, video, and found objects commingle. Tapping a multitude of sources, from Germanic folk traditions to recent popular culture, from medieval and gothic religious imagery to early modern expressionism, Althoff's characters inhabit imaginary worlds that serve as allegories for human experience and emotion. His image bank and painterly style also draw on the past, especially early-20th-century German Expressionism, reconfigured by introducing collaged technique.

Much of Althoff's work is collaborative. For the 4th Berlin Biennale, Althoff and Lutz Braun created the site-specific installation Kolten Flynn, made up of three vitrines draped in red foil and full of a child's paintings, drawings, pens and other abandoned materials. Along with Yair Oelbaum, he conceived the dramatic play There we will be buried (2010), which debuted in 2011 at the Dixon Studio in Southend-on-Sea in Essex, England. For their U.S.-premiere performance at the Whitney Museum of American Art, the pair portrayed the show's main characters, Orpah and Lydia, two single mothers searching for a lost daughter. In Die Kleine Bushaltestelle (Gerüstbau) (Little Bus Stop [Scaffolding], 2012) Althoff performed alongside fellow artist Isa Genzken in a 70-minute absurdist comedy shot on home video.

Althoff's work has been included in several books listing contemporary artists, such as Art Now, published by Taschen. He is also a musician, releasing solo work under such monikers as Fanal, Engelhardt/Seef/Davis Coop. or Ashley's. He and Justus Köhncke perform as Subtle Tease, and he co-founded the band Workshop with Christoph Rath, Stefan Mohr and Stephan Abry.

Althoff is represented by Gladstone Gallery in New York, Galerie NEU in Berlin, and Michael Werner Gallery in London.

== Exhibitions ==
Althoff has been the subject of solo exhibitions worldwide, including Kaiki, an exhibition of artist Kai Althoff's work selected by Saim Demircan at Focal Point Gallery in Southend-on-Sea in 2011; Kai Althoff in 2008 at Vancouver Art Gallery;Kai Althoff: Ich meine es auf jeden fall schlecht mit ihnen in 2007 Kunsthalle Zürich; Kai Althoff: Kai kein Respekt (Kai No Respect) in 2004 at Institute of Contemporary Art, Boston and Museum of Contemporary Art, Chicago; Immo in 2004 at Simultanhalle, Cologne; Kai Althoff and Armin Kraemer in 2002 at Kunstverein Braunschweig, Braunschweig; and Heetz, Nowak, Rehberger in 1997 at Museo de Arte Contemporanea USP, São Paulo. From 18 September 2016 through 22 January 2017, Kai Althoff: and then leave me to the common swifts was on view at the Museum of Modern Art, New York. In 2014, a solo exhibition, Kai Althoff, was presented at Michael Werner Gallery, London.

Current group exhibitions include Invisible Adversaries: the Marieluise Hessel Collection, Center for Curatorial Studies, Hessel Museum of Art, Bard College, Annandale-on-Hudson and Identity Revisited, The Warehouse, Dallas in 2016; Avatar and Atavism: Outside the Avant-Garde, Kunsthalle Düsseldorf, Düsseldorf in 2015; Not Yet Titled, Museum Ludwig, Cologne in 2013.

=== Selected group exhibitions ===
- 1993: Aperto 93, Venice Biennale, Stand Schafhausen, Venice
- 1993: E, Künstlerhaus Bethanien, Berlin
- 1995: Wild Walls, Stedelijk Museum, Amsterdam
- 1996: Wunderbar, Kunstverein, Hamburg
- 1997: Time Out, Kunsthalle Nürnberg, Nuremberg
- 1997: Home Sweet Home, Deichtorhallen, Hamburg
- 1998: Ars Viva 98/99, Kunstverein Braunschweig, Braunschweig; Brandenburgische Kunstsammlungen, Cottbus; Portikus, Frankfurt
- 1999: German Open. Gegenwartskunst in Deutschland, Kunstmuseum Wolfsburg, Wolfsburg
- 2001: Vom Eindruck zum Ausdruck, Grasslin Collection, Deichtorhallen, Hamburg
- 2001: Neue Welt, Frankfurter Kunstverein, Frankfurt
- 2002: Drawing Now: Eight Propositions, Museum of Modern Art in New York City
- 2002: Chère Paintre, Liebe Maler, Dear Painter at the Pompidou Centre in Paris
- 2003: A Perilous Space at Magnani in London
- 2003: Lieber Maler, male mir and Schirn Kunsthalle, Frankfurt
- 2003: Venice Biennale, Museo Correr, Venice
- 2006: Painting in Tongues at Museum of Contemporary Art, Los Angeles
- 2006: Heart of Darkness: Kai Althoff, Ellen Gallagher and EdgarCleijne, Thomas Hirschhorn at Walker Art Center, Minneapolis
- 2007: Make Your Own Life: Artists In & Out of Cologne, Museum of Contemporary Art, Miami
- 2008: Life on Mars at Carnegie International, Pittsburgh
- 2009: Between Art and Life: The Painting and Sculpture Collection, San Francisco Museum of Modern Art, San Francisco
- 2009: Compass in Hand: Selections from the Judith Rothschild Foundation, Museum of Modern Art, New York
- 2009: Mapping the Studio: Artists from the Francois Pinault Collection, Palazzo Grassi, Venice
- 2009: Brandon Stosuy and Kai Althoff: Mirror Me, DISPATCH Projects, New York
- 2010: Beyond | In WNY, Alternating Currents, Albright Knox Triennial, New York
- 2010: At Home/Not at Home: Works from the Collection of Martin and Rebecca Eisenberg, Bard Center for Curatorial Studies and Hessel Museum of Art, New York
- 2012: A Bigger Splash: Painting after Performance, Tate, London
- 2012: The Whitney Biennial, Whitney Museum of American Art, New York
- 2020 Kai Althoff goes with Bernard Leach, Whitechapel Gallery, London
- 2024 di costole, Nervi delle Volpi, Genoa

=== Contributions ===
- 2008: "Artist: Kai Althoff, Life on Mars: 55th Carnegie International". blog.cmoa.org. Archived from the original on 9 February 2012.

== Bibliography ==
- Bracewell, Michael; Doig, Peter; Klein, Romeo; Morell, Helena (2015). Kai Althoff: Recent Paintings. Michael Werner. ISBN 978-1-938809-18-7.
- Althoff, Kai (2016). Kai Althoff: and then leave me to the common swifts. Museum of Modern Art, New York. ISBN 978-1-56898-083-6.
