= Parker Ito =

American painter (born 1986)

- Born: 1986 (age 39–40); Long Beach, California, U.S.
- Known for: Painting, Sculpture, Video Art
- Movement: Post-Internet, Contemporary art
- Website: parker.sex

Parker Ito (born 1986) is a contemporary artist. He is a fourth-generation Japanese American, or Yonsei, living and working in Los Angeles.

== Life ==
Parker Ito was born and raised in Long Beach, California. In his youth, he acted and sang on television. Before becoming a professional artist, he aspired to become a professional skateboarder and worked painting oil derricks in Los Angeles.

== Art practice ==
Ito creates paintings, sculptures, and video works by drawing upon his experience online as both an artist and an audience. In promoting Ito's residency at MGM Resorts in Las Vegas, art critic and curator Nicolas Bourriaud wrote of Ito's work, “The works of ... Parker Ito have no origin, no source code. They are made in circuits – they proliferate and surge.”

=== Production ===
One element of Ito's working style involves hiring paid assistants to produce work. He allows for the produced works to be made in the style of the hired hand. This strategy was used in his body of work, The Most Infamous Girl in the History of the Internet, a project created while he was still attending California College of the Arts in Oakland. For this work, a popular stock photo which features a young girl wearing a backpack on a college campus was manually reproduced and manipulated through painting in several different styles and interpretations.

The use of hired hands was also notably used to produce the works shown at the White Cube gallery in London for his exhibition Part 2: Nora Berman, Blackwidow LA, Parker Cheeto, Carey Garris, Justin John Greene, Celia Hollander, Daniel Lane, Lee Marshall and Orion Martin: Maid in Heaven / En Plein Air in Hell (My Beautiful Dark and Twisted Cheeto Problem), 2014.

Ito is known for producing very high volumes of work, once writing, "I heard that Picasso made around 250,000 works in his lifetime. I could make that many jpegs in five years. And when I say five years, I mean five minutes."

=== Conceptual concerns ===
Ito has said that he is not concerned about maintaining ownership over ideas or stylistic decisions in a period where information sharing is ubiquitous. He is a champion of the Internet and believes that the spreading of ideas is the primary purpose of its existence.

=== Critical reception ===
While Ito has received some positive reception – Chris Kraus called a 2015 exhibition "a stunning, vertiginous private museum multiplied hundreds of times" – other critics have been less positive. Oliver Basciano for ArtReview described a 2014 exhibition: "I concluded that I really couldn’t give a s**t... a mirror, with no commentary, with nothing at stake, just a mire of Gen-Y nihilism ."

== Career ==
Parker Ito is represented by Château Shatto, a Los Angeles-based art gallery owned by Olivia Barrett, Ito's relationship partner and dealer, and Beijing Art Now Gallery in Beijing, China.

In addition to his solo work, Ito has collaborated with other artists, such as the duo Body by Body (Melissa Sachs and Cameron Soren).

=== Art market ===
Franklin Melendez writes that "in Parker Ito's contentious relationship to the art market... Boasted as its champion or derided as a harbinger of its collapse, Parker has remained tethered to its ebb and flow in most critical discussions of his work. Granted, this is far from incidental, as his production model willfully undermines (or at least f**ks with) the market's standing currencies: deliberately hyper-producing, refusing to subscribe to the usual signs of authenticity (like signatures), or exploding them to monumental proportions until they too become another visual motif."

Parker Ito was one of 30 or so emerging artists that were associated with Stefan Simchowitz. He met Ito in 2012, alongside Jon Rafman, Petra Cortright and Artie Vierkant, saying “In all of these guys, I identified the makings of a movement.” Simchowitz claims he was Ito's first client, purchasing a painting from him when the artist was 22 for $750, and flipping it for $1500.

In the mid-2010s, Ito's work experienced a rapid increase in value, peaking in February 2014 at $93,594, significantly higher than the high estimate of $25,000. That year, the Wall Street Journal described him as one of several "young artists on a rocket". In July 2014, a work sold for $80,000, but in the year after that, his auction results averaged $30,000 per or had works unsold. By 2017, the Journal described his auction prices as rarely exceeding $5,000 and cited him as example of an artist whose value had been reduced by works flooding the market after an initial success.

During the period leading up to his 2014 auction high, Ito's relationship with Simchowitz became an art-world controversy due to Simchowitz's buying Ito's art at low prices to immediately resell at higher ones. By 2015, Ito was actively distancing himself from him.

== See also ==
- Post-Internet
