= Thomas Houseago =

British artist

- Education: Jacob Kramer College, Leeds; Central Saint Martins, London; De Ateliers. Amsterdam
- Known for: sculpture, painting

Thomas Houseago (born 1972) is a British contemporary artist. He lives in Los Angeles, California, and also has American citizenship. Much of his work has been figurative sculpture, often on a large scale, in plaster, bronze or aluminium; his large plaster Baby was included in the Whitney Biennial in 2010. He has also made architectural installations.

== Life and career ==
Houseago grew up in Leeds in West Yorkshire, where his mother was a teacher. He did his foundation year at Jacob Kramer College in Leeds, and in 1991 went to Central Saint Martins College of Art and Design in London. He then studied at De Ateliers in Amsterdam, where he came into contact with figurative artists such as Marlene Dumas, Thomas Schütte and Luc Tuymans. He lived for eight years in Brussels before moving to Los Angeles in 2003. Houseago held his first solo exhibition, titled Serpent (2009), in the United States at David Kordansky Gallery in Los Angeles, which was also the gallery's inaugural show. In the Frogtown district of Los Angeles, his studio complex occupies four single-story industrial buildings along the Los Angeles River.

Donald and Mera Rubell, art collectors from Miami, bought several of his works in 2006. His large plaster Baby was included in the Whitney Biennial in 2010, and in 2011 L'Homme Pressé, a tall bronze figure of a walking man, was installed in front of Palazzo Grassi on the Grand Canal in Venice during the Biennale.

In 2022, he collaborated with Brad Pitt and Nick Cave for an exhibit at the Sara Hildén Art Museum in Tampere, Finland entitled We.

== Art market ==
Houseago is represented by Xavier Hufkens Gallery, Blum, Gagosian Gallery, and Hauser & Wirth. Early in his career, Houseago began a relationship with Xavier Hufkens Gallery in Brussels. He later began showing with Michael Werner Gallery in New York. He was previously represented by David Kordansky in Los Angeles.

== Personal life ==
During his time at De Ateliers, Houseago met the American painter Amy Bessone with whom he lived until 2013.
