= Post-Internet =

21st century art movement

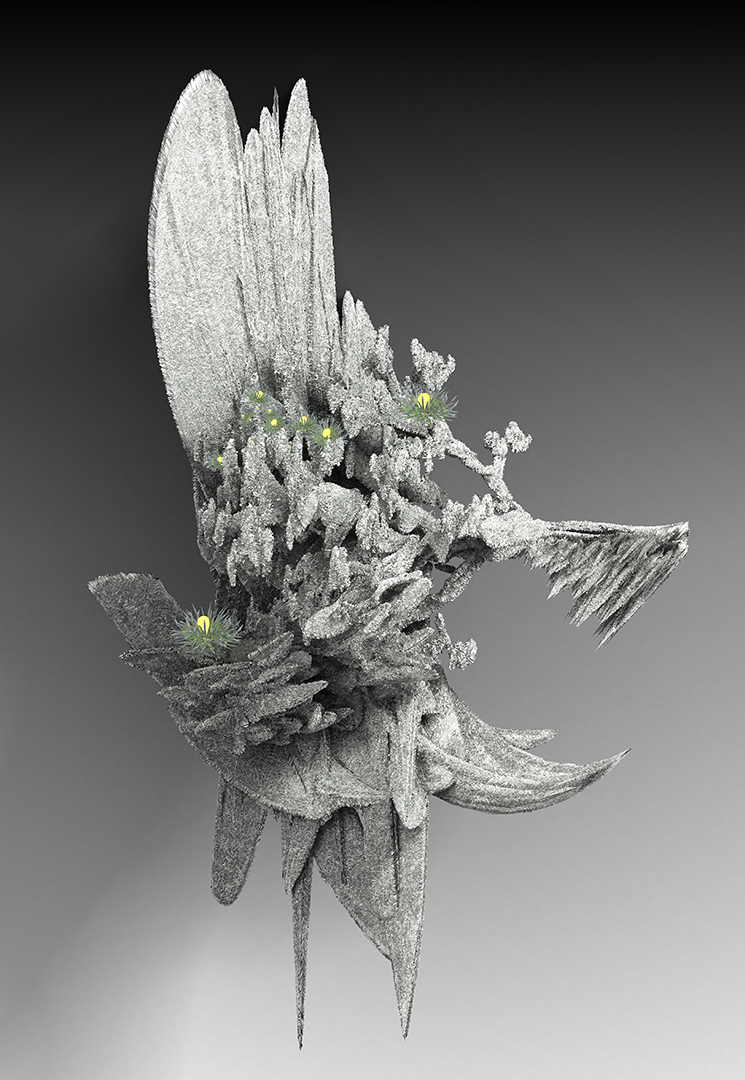
"Chernobyl", from the "Computer Viruses" series, by Stepan Ryabchenko (2011).

Post-Internet is a loosely defined 21st-century art movement that generally referred to contemporary art concerning the concept of the Internet no longer being perceived as a novelty in society. In 2006, artist Marisa Olson coined the term "postinternet art" to describe her work. The term was then adopted by writer Gene McHugh who authored a blog titled "Post-Internet" in 2009, which further discussed and popularized the concept into a movement growing out of previous Internet Art.

The movement is associated with the 21st century contemporary art world and aimed to reflect the ubiquity of the Internet in the Information Age through practices derived from the Internet as a medium or its effects on aesthetics, culture and society. Notable artists include Jon Rafman, Artie Vierkant, Ryan Trecartin, Brad Troemel, Joshua Citarella, Molly Soda, Cory Arcangel, Stepan Ryabchenko, Parker Ito, Kalup Linzy, Amalia Ulman, Petra Cortright, Ryder Ripps, Andrew Norman Wilson, DIS, Seth Price, Katja Novitskova, Jonathan Monaghan, Rachel de Joode and Lizzie Fitch.

== Etymology ==
In 2006, artist/curator Marisa Olson coined the term "postinternet art" in an attempt to describe her practice. Digital art and the internet date back to the 1970s. Post-internet art refers to art made after the internet became a ubiquitous part of day-to-day life. According to the UCCA Center for Contemporary Art in Beijing, rather than referring "to a time 'after' the internet", the term refers to "an internet state of mind". Eva Folks of AQNB wrote that it "references one so deeply embedded in and propelled by the internet that the notion of a world or culture without or outside it becomes increasingly unimaginable, impossible." According to a 2015 article in The New Yorker, the term describes "the practices of artists [whose] artworks move fluidly between spaces, appearing sometimes on a screen, other times in a gallery." Fast Company's Carey Dunne summarizes they are "artists who are inspired by the visual cacophony of the web" and notes that "mediums from Second Life portraits to digital paintings on silk to 3-D-printed sculpture" are used.

There is theoretical overlap with writer and artist James Bridle's term New Aesthetic. Ian Wallace of Artspace writes that "the influential blog The New Aesthetic, run since May 2011 by Bridle, is a pioneering institution in the post-Internet movement" and concludes that "much of the energy around the New Aesthetic seems, now, to have filtered over into the "post-Internet" conversation." Post-Internet art is also discussed by Katja Novitskova as being a part of 'New Materialism'.

Wallace considers the Post-Internet term to stand for "a new aesthetic era," moving "beyond making work dependent on the novelty of the Web to using its tools to tackle other subjects". He notes that the post-Internet generation "frequently uses digital strategies to create objects that exist in the real world." Or as Louis Doulas writes in Within Post-Internet, Part One (2011): "There is a difference then, in an art that chooses to exist outside of a browser window and an art that chooses to stay within it."

The term is controversial and the subject of much criticism in the art community. Art in America's Brian Droitcour in 2014 opined that the term fails to describe the form of the works, instead "alluding only to a hazy contemporary condition and the idea of art being made in the context of digital technology."

== History ==
In 2009, Gene McHugh adopted Marisa Olson's term "postinternet art" and authored the blog "Post-Internet", which began the movement while further discussing and popularizing the concept. Artist and creator of Image Object sculpture series Artie Vierkant also developed the idea. The term has been described as loosely defined while the movement itself grew out of Internet Art and Net.art. That same year, artists Brad Troemel, Artie Vierkant and Lauren Christiansen created the Tumblr blog The Jogging which received attention for its work in post internet art. The blog showcased Google Images and online products photoshopped together as artworks. The site grew in the summer of 2012 due to the inclusion of several new members.

== Exhibitions ==
There have been a number of significant group art shows explicitly exploring Post-Internet themes. There was a 2014 exhibition called Art Post-Internet at Beijing's Ullens Center for Contemporary Art, which ARTnews named one of the "most art exhibitions of the 2010s" which "set out to encapsulate the budding movement." MoMA curated Ocean of Images in 2015, a show "probing the effects of an image-based post-Internet reality." The 2016 9th Berlin Biennale, titled The Present in Drag, curated by the art collective DIS, is described as a Post-Internet exhibition. Other examples include:

- Body Anxiety, all-female online group show curated by Jennifer Chan and Leah Schraeger that quotes Ann Hirsch saying, "whenever you put your body online, you are in conversation with porn."
- The Last Brucennial, New York, 2014. Part of the Brucennial series of exhibitions curated by Bruce High Quality Foundation. “We came out of a tradition rooted in institutional critique, but we’re dated to the internet. Back then, it felt like you had to do things in real space for it to count. Now you start on the internet and then do it in real space,” the collective told Spike Magazine critic Victoria Campbell looking back on 700 works by female artists for the last edition, in 2014, of the group show started in 2009.
- Raster Raster, Aran Cravey Gallery, Los Angeles, 2014
- 2015 Triennial: Surround Audience at New Museum, New York, 2015
- Zero Zero, Annka Kulty Gallery, London, 2016

== Notable artists ==
- Stepan Ryabchenko. In his artwork, the artist creates his own digital universe with its heroes and mythology.
- AIDS-3D (Daniel Keller and Nik Kosmas)
- Cory Arcangel
- Kai (Kari) Altmann
- Petra Cortright, whose work includes YouTube video work and digital paintings. She was included in "Raster Raster" and the 9th Berlin Biennale
- DIS
- Aleksandra Domanović
- Parker Ito
- Rachel de Joode
- Oliver Laric
- Kalup Linzy
- Jonathan Monaghan
- Katja Novitskova whose work focuses on issues of technology, evolutionary processes, digital imagery and corporate aesthetics and was included in the 9th Berlin Biennale
- Seth Price
- Jon Rafman, whose work was included in the 9th Berlin Biennale
- Ryder Ripps
- Bunny Rogers
- Timur Si-Qin
- Mario Santamaría
- Molly Soda, who co-curated and included her own work in "Zero Zero"
- Hito Steyerl
- Theo Triantafyllidis
- Ryan Trecartin and Lizzie Fitch, whose work was included in the 9th Berlin Biennale and who co-curated the New Museum's 2015 triennial Surround Audience
- Brad Troemel, Joshua Citarella, and Molly Soda
- Amalia Ulman, whose work was included in the 9th Berlin Biennale
- Andrew Norman Wilson
- Bruce High Quality Foundation

== Gallery ==
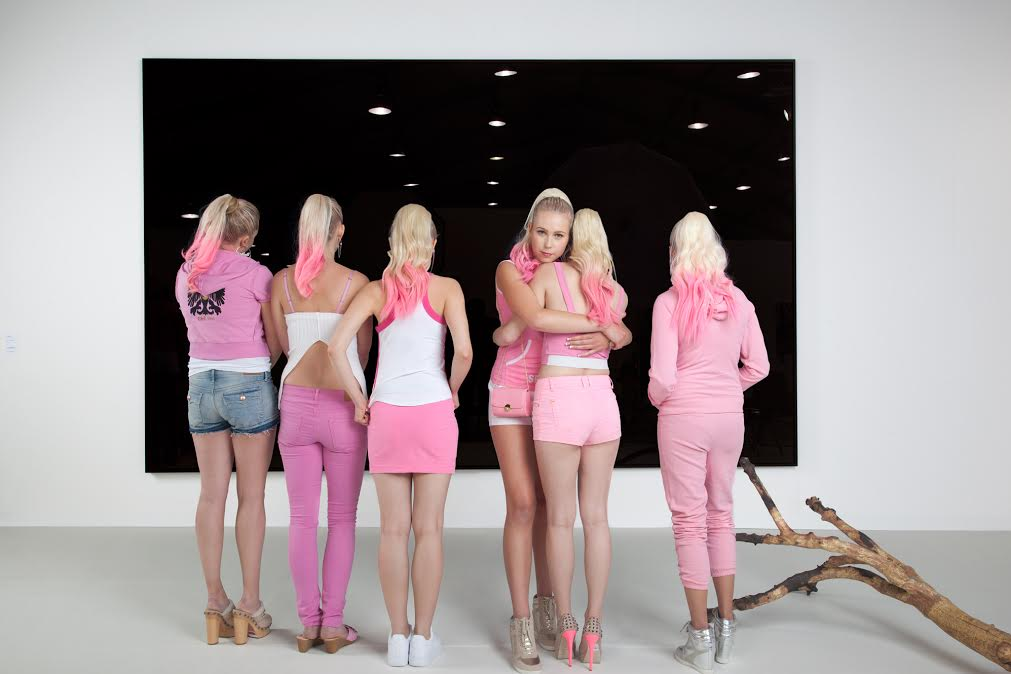
Photo by DIS. Fair Trade, Frieze Projects 2012

== See also ==
- Post-Internet (music) – Music inspired by the post-Internet art movement
- Dimes Square – New York City microneighborhood and Internet art scene
- Digital art – Art created digitally with a computer
- Internet art – Form of art distributed on the Internet
- net.art – Group of artists that use the Internet as their medium
- Consumer Aesthetics Research Institute – Online community
- New Aesthetic – Artistic movement exploring the intersection of the digital and physical worlds
- Extremely online – Phenomenon of over-engaging with Internet culture
- Internet aesthetics – Visual styles and subcultures associated with the internet
- Internet culture – Culture that has emerged from the use of computer networks
- Internet meme – Cultural item spread via the Internet
- New media art – Artworks designed and produced by means of electronic media technologies
