= Bitforms gallery =

Contemporary art gallery in New York City

Coordinates: 40°43′13.6″N 73°59′24.6″W

bitforms gallery (stylized as bitforms gallery) is a contemporary art gallery in New York City devoted to new media art practices. It was founded in 2001 by Steven Sacks, and represents established, mid-career, and emerging artists critically engaged with new technologies.

In September 2014, bitforms gallery relocated from Chelsea to the Lower East Side in a ground-level storefront space on Allen Street. In 2017, they opened a San Francisco popup.

== See also ==
- New media art
- Digital art
- Generative art
- Post-Internet
