= NewHive =

- Website type: Social network and Publishing platform
- Available in: English
- Website: newhive.com/b/
- Commercial: No
- Registration: Required to post, follow, or be followed
- Launched: February 2014
- Current status: Suspended

NewHive was both a social network and a creation engine for Web 2.0 content. It was a web platform that encouraged users to develop their own creative content that had been coined by NewHive as, expressions. Many members of the NewHive community were productive artists with established practices, creating, “A critical framework around post-internet art practices by engaging with the art world and contemporary society".

== Features ==
The NewHive site used Python, MongoDB, and JavaScript in a user-friendly interface. The site was hosted by Amazon's cloud services. NewHive allowed text, links, photos, videos, drawings, music, GIFs, and more to be composed into website collages. It also allowed embedding of material from YouTube, Spotify, and so on. GIFs could be combined into single scrolling pages, which NewHive called GIF walls. Saved pages can be allowed for others to remix them.

NewHive was involved with new practices in contemporary art since its launch, fostering trends and allowing for the creation of thousands of art works. In addition to working with curators and promoting works created by users, it regularly commissioned multimedia mixtapes, singles, zines, ebooks, curated exhibitions, and solo projects by emerging and established artists engaged with the Internet. NewHive also worked in partnership with organizations like Asylum Arts, the Goethe-Institut and the Museum of the Moving Image.

== Revenue model ==
NewHive was backed by private investors and was free to use, and ads were never placed on expressions but NewHive hoped to eventually sell new tools to the creators who used them as one of their means to raise revenue. CEO Zach Verdin said, “In addition to a marketplace that will allow third-party developers to create applications, extensions and widgets; the New Hive will provide services...such as customized URLs and personally branded hives...

== History ==
The concept behind NewHive was developed in 2008 by cofounders Zach Verdin, Cara Bucciferro, Abram Clark, and Andrew Sorkin and was on-line in private beta in November 2011. Seed funding of $100,000 was obtained from private donors including SV Angel in 2012 allowing the platform to be launched in beta followed by a public launch on February 18, 2014. Visual artists, like Molly Soda and Labanna Babalon, were among the first people to appear on NewHive. NewHive ceased active operations in 2018.
