= Katja Novitskova =

Estonian artist

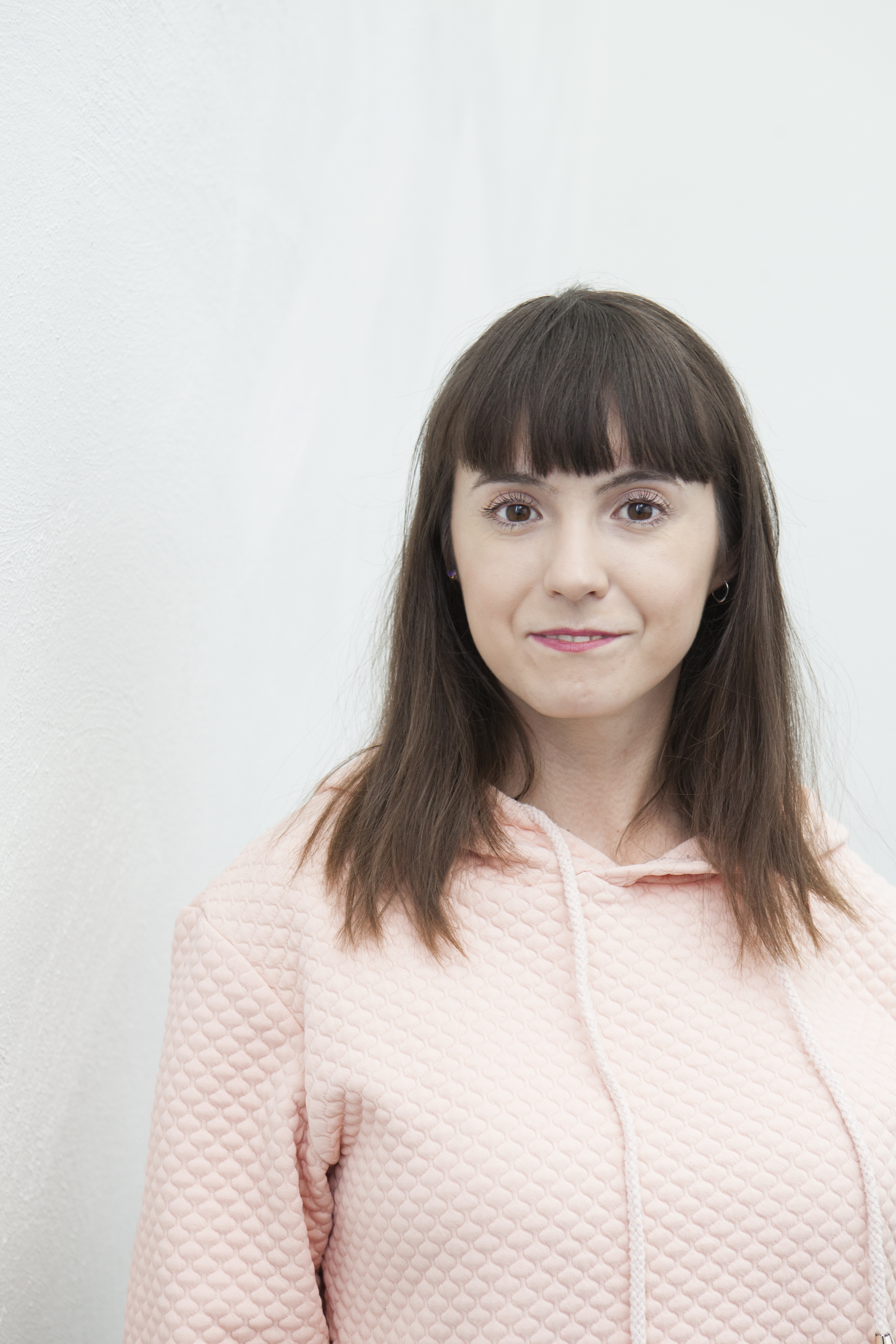
- Spirit, Curiosity and Opportunity, Kraupa-Tuskany Zeidler, Berlin (03.05.2014–28.06.2014)
- Born: 1984 (age 41–42); Tallinn, then part of Estonian SSR, Soviet Union
- Education: University of Lübeck, Germany; Sandburg Instituut, Amsterdam; University of Tartu, Estonia
- Known for: Installation
- Notable work: The Cambrian Explosion 001 (2012), Post Internet Survival Guide (2010)
- Movement: Postinternet

Katja Novitskova (born 1984 in Tallinn) is an Estonian installation artist. She lives and works in Amsterdam and Berlin. Her work focuses on issues of technology, evolutionary processes, digital imagery and corporate aesthetics. Novitskova is interested in investigating how, "media actively redefines the world and culture, and everything" related to art, nature and commerce.

== Education ==
Novitskova holds degrees in Semiotics and Cultural Studies as well as a specialization in Media Arts from the University of Tartu, Estonia. She also completed a Masters of Science in Digital Media, University of Lübeck, Germany in addition to studying at the Graphic Design department at the Sandberg Instituut, Amsterdam. Further funding and research for her artistic practice has been supported by the Prins Bernhard Cultuurfonds, the residency programme for visual artists at the Rijksakademie van beeldende kunsten and the Mondriaan Fund.

== Work ==
Novitskova has shown at SALTS, Basel, Bard Centre for Curatorial Studies with Timur Si-Qin, M HKA, Antwerp, Belgium and at the Ullens Center for Contemporary Art, Beijing.

Key themes in her practice have evolved from an interest in post-internet art practices, technology and the biological evolution within the current geological era (the Anthropocene). A re-occurring theme in her works are images of animals sourced online, which appear larger than life in her installations and are digitally printed onto aluminium. These works belong specifically to a series of images titled Approximation.

For her first solo exhibition Macro Expansion she reassembled images from online search engines by filtering them into recombinations influenced by advertisement and corporate branding. By lifting images from their "natural" habitat she wished to demonstrate the evolutionary processes of technological advancement, economic expansion and positivistic adaptations to flora, fauna and humankind.

Novitskova was also a contributor to Digital Life Design Women14 in Munich, an exhibition moderated by the art curator Hans-Ulrich Obrist where she presented "Patterns of Activation". Regarding her text "Post Internet Survival Guide", Novitskova has stated that, "The notion of a survival guide arises as an answer to a basic human need to cope with increasing complexity. In the face of death, personal attachment and confusion, one has to feel, interpret and index this ocean of signs in order to survive.”

In December 2013, Novitskova participated in TEDxVaduz, organized by the artists Simon Denny and Daniel Keller at the Kunstmuseum Liechtenstein. The collaborative project was an independently organized and licensed TED event which aimed to implicitly critique the format of branding and the cultural implications of TED's global economies. Invited artist created a stage design as well as objects and images which were exhibited as part of a series of presentations and talks. Novitskova contributed with an installation and a talk titled "Attention, Economies and Art."

In 2019, Novitskova was shortlisted for the Preis der Nationalgalerie, a nomination accompanied by an exhibition at Hamburger Bahnhof - Museum für Gegenwart, Berlin.

=== Venice Biennale ===
Pavilion of Estonia presented "If Only You Could See What I’ve Seen with Your Eyes" by Katja Novitskova at the Estonian pavilion at the 57th International Art Exhibition – La Biennale di Venezia (13.05 – 26.11.2017). The exhibition was curated by Kati Ilves. "If Only You Could See What I’ve Seen with Your Eyes" addressed the relationship between the domain of seeing, big data-driven industries, and ecology in times of biotic crisis.
