= Hurvin Anderson =

British painter (born 1965)

Hurvin Anderson RA
- Born: 1965 (age 60–61); Handsworth, Birmingham, England
- Education: Wimbledon College of Arts (BA) (1994); Royal College of Art (MA) (1998)
- Known for: Painting

Hurvin Anderson RA (born 1965 in Birmingham) is a British painter. His work explores the experience of immigration from the Caribbean, addressing the unreliability of memory and tension around cultural heritage.

== Early life and education ==
Anderson was born in Handsworth, Birmingham in 1965, as the youngest of eight children. He was the only child to be born in the UK after his parents Elsade and Stedford Anderson had left Jamaica for the UK in the 1960s as a part of the Windrush Generation.

Anderson has been interested in the arts since childhood. He was known for carrying a sketchbook everywhere, often drawing depictions of black protagonists and superheroes. Anderson realised he could pursue a career in art after attending an exhibition of black contemporary art with his brother. It was through this exhibition that Anderson discovered his interest in photography, which plays a key role in his artwork.

After a Foundation year at Birmingham Polytechnic, Anderson was a Cheltenham Fine Art Research Fellow (Painting) at Cheltenham & Gloucester College of Higher Education. He later received a BA in Fine Art/Painting from Wimbledon College of Arts in 1994, mentored by George Blacklock and John Mitchell. Anderson graduated from Royal College of Art with an MA in Painting by 1998. Throughout his years at school he received multiple awards as well as the William Booker travel scholarship. During this time, economic issues resulted in the necessity to find work immediately. This included both odd jobs and studio work.

== Practice ==
Anderson often works from photographs and his memories to create works that range from delicate paintings on vellum to large canvases that can consume an entire wall. His paintings and works on paper "depict places where memory and history converge" and engage with issues of identity and representation. While works such as Studio Drawing 15 (2016) mark a shift toward abstraction in his oeuvre, the motifs of the barbershop, densely layered trees, and Caribbean landscapes have been consistently featured throughout most of his career.

Anderson is known for painting lush and loosely rendered observations of scenes and spaces loaded with personal meaning. For instance, the artist has become known for using a thick application of neon paints to create picturesque and collage-like landscapes. However, some of his works have been known to intervene in the history and aesthetics of photography. Anderson works both from memory and from photographs, and many of his paintings include second-hand interpretations of a first-hand experience. He bases his artwork on vintage and contemporary photographs of the British and Caribbean landscapes, which he uses to express ideas on the colonial histories of countries. At times, Anderson places Jamaican and Caribbean greenery within British landscapes to explore the history of colonial societies extracting and cultivating plants from colonized countries for their own use. Among his most acclaimed works are the Garden of Love series, which comprises paintings of Caribbean landscapes, and the Barber Shop series, which pays tribute to the historic barbershop culture of London's Afro-Caribbean community. The artist's painting style blends abstraction with figuration. Characterized by vibrant colours and complex textures, Anderson's paintings evoke a sense of nostalgia. There is a perennial sense of distance or detachment in Anderson's work that shines through in Untitled (Beach Scene).

While Anderson was born in the United Kingdom, his parents are from Jamaica. This double-sided heritage informs many of the motifs often expressed in Anderson's work. He experiments with the markers of identity in both contemporary Britain and the Caribbean, as well as the socio-cultural effects of the expanded colonial world. Anderson's work has expanded the boundaries of the genre of landscape painting in art history; through landscape and environmental themes, he addresses issues surrounding culture, community, colonial history, and identity. His works continue to speak today on globalism and ideas of capitalism as well as selfhood.

=== Residencies, awards and fellowships ===
- 2018: Robson Orr TenTen Award
- 2017: nomination for the Turner Prize
- 2009: Artists in residence, Headlands Center for the Arts, Sausalito
- 2005: Artist in residence, Dulwich Picture Gallery, London
- 2002: Artist in residence, Caribbean Contemporary Arts Residency Programme, Port of Spain, Trinidad
- 1996: Basil H. Alkazzi Foundation Scholarship Award
- 1990–2000: Cheltenham Fine Art Research Fellow in Painting, Cheltenham and Gloucester College of Higher Education

=== Selected early artworks (2000–2005) ===
- "Peter's House" (2002) - A painting depicting a domestic interior, which laid the foundation for his later exploration of barbershop interiors in the "Peter's Series."
- "Jamaican House" (2003) - A painting of a house in Jamaica, reflecting Anderson's interest in the architecture and cultural heritage of the Caribbean.
- "Green Room" (2004) - A painting featuring a domestic interior with a green color palette, which would later become characteristic of his work.
- "Untitled (Barbershop)" (2004) - An early work in the barbershop theme, depicting the interior of a barbershop with an emphasis on patterns and colors.
- "Self-Portrait" (2004) - A self-portrait showcasing Anderson's skills in figuration and attention to detail.
- "Fenced Houses" (2005) - A painting of houses surrounded by fences, highlighting themes of protection, privacy, and community.

=== Selected later artworks (2005–present) ===
- "Peter's Series" (2007–2009) - This series features paintings inspired by the barbershops in the UK and Jamaica, drawing on themes of cultural identity, belonging, and memory.
- "Country Club Series" (2008) - A series of paintings depicting golf courses in Jamaica, exploring the contrasting environments of luxury and the everyday.
- "Untitled (Red Flags)" (2009) - A painting featuring a group of flags on a red background, with an abstract, patterned quality.
- "Afrosheen" (2009) - A painting of a barbershop interior, depicting a shelf with a range of hair products and featuring elements of abstraction and figuration.
- "Beaver Lake" (2010) - A painting inspired by Anderson's trips to Canada, which explores the theme of landscape and memory.
- "Swimming Pool Series" (2011-2014) - A series of paintings depicting swimming pools in various states of use or disrepair, reflecting on the themes of leisure, escape, and decay.
- "Backdrop Series" (2011-2014) - A series of paintings featuring the recurring motif of a tropical landscape, exploring the idea of the constructed image and the representation of cultural identity.
- "Palm Top Theatre" (2011) - A painting combining a tropical landscape with a theatre backdrop, playing with illusion and reality.
- "Is It Okay To Be Black?" (2016) - A work featuring the question "Is It Okay To Be Black?" painted in large letters, accompanied by abstract patterns and colors, addressing themes of race and identity.
- "Foreign Body" (2016) - A painting depicting a green landscape overlaid with the outline of a human figure, exploring themes of alienation and the body in the landscape.

== Exhibitions ==
His work has been exhibited in group and solo exhibitions in the UK and the US. In 2024, the solo exhibition Hurvin Anderson: Passenger Opportunity at the Pérez Art Museum Miami, United States, revolved around a new large-scale series of a sixteen-panel paintings. Curated by Franklin Sirmans, the works in the exhibition draw inspiration from the murals of Jamaican artist Carl Abrahams in the departures area of Jamaica’s Norman Manley International Airport in Kingston. In 2026, Tate Britain presented his first major solo exhibition, showing more than 80 paintings from his student days to new, never-before-seen paintings.The work is an emotional as well a deeply political attempt to deal with the past.

Anderson is represented by Thomas Dane Gallery in London and VeneKlasen in New York.

=== Selected solo exhibitions ===
- Hurvin Anderson, Tate Britain, London (2026)
- Hurvin Anderson: Passenger Opportunity, Pérez Art Museum Miami, Florida (2024)
- Foreign Body, Michael Werner Gallery, New York (2016)
- Backdrop, Art Gallery of Ontario (AGO), Toronto (2016)
- Dub Versions, New Art Exchange, Nottingham (2016)
- Backdrop, CAM, St. Louis (2015)
- Reporting Back, Ikon Gallery, Birmingham (2013)
- Subtitles, Michael Werner Gallery, New York (2011)
- Art Now: Hurvin Anderson, Tate Britain, London (2009)
- Peter's Series 2007–09, Studio Museum Harlem, New York (2009)

=== Selected group exhibitions ===
- Turner Prize 2017, Ferens Art Gallery, Hull (2017)
- Jamaican Pulse: Art and Politics from Jamaica and the Diaspora, Royal West of England Academy, Bristol (2016)
- Making & Unmaking, Camden Arts Centre, London (2016)
- Poetics of Relation, Pérez Art Museum, Miami (2015)
- Homebodies, Museum of Contemporary Art, Chicago (2013)
- Self-Consciousness, curated by Hilton Als and Peter Doig, VW (VeneKlasen/Werner), Berlin (2010)
- Telling Times, Leicester Museum and Art Gallery, Leicester (2000)
- Inheritance, Ikon Touring, Birmingham (1995)
