= Jennifer Chan =

Jennifer Chan may refer to:

- Jennifer Tilly (born 1958), American actress
- Jennifer Chan (musician), former radio personality and singer-songwriter from Hong Kong
- Jennifer Chan (artist), Canadian media artist
- Jennifer Dy Chan, Filipino Olympian archer
