= Marc Horowitz =

American artist (born 1976)

- Horowitz performing in The Aesthetics of Stability, de boer, Los Angeles, 2022
- Born: July 19, 1976 (age 50); Columbus, Ohio, U.S.
- Occupations: Artist, painter, sculptor, performance artist
- Notable work: The National Dinner Tour, 7 Days in a Sentra, The Signature Series, The Advice of Strangers
- Spouse: Petra Cortright
- Website: www.1833marcive.com

Marc Horowitz (born July 19, 1976) is an American artist based in Los Angeles whose work spans performance, painting, sculpture, video and social practice. Drawing on a background in business and marketing, he first drew national attention in 2004 with The National Dinner Tour, which began when he slipped his phone number into a Crate & Barrel catalog. He was later represented by the William Morris Agency and made participatory projects for brands and networks, including Nissan's 7 Days in a Sentra campaign and Crackle's The Signature Series, before turning to painting and sculpture in 2015. His recent exhibitions combine painting with live performance.

== Early life and education ==
Horowitz was born in Columbus, Ohio, and grew up in nearby Westerville. At seventeen he entered Indiana University Bloomington, graduating from the Kelley School of Business with a degree in marketing and microeconomics; he became interested in art after taking a painting class with Robert Barnes in his final year. After working in Silicon Valley during the dot-com boom, he attended the San Francisco Art Institute on scholarship, where he studied with the social-practice artists Harrell Fletcher and Jon Rubin; he left after about a year. In the summer of 2001 he was an artist in residence at Recology San Francisco, where he met his longtime collaborator Jon Brumit.

Horowitz completed a Master of Fine Arts at the University of Southern California Roski School of Fine Arts in May 2012, where he studied with Charlie White, Sharon Lockhart, Evan Holloway and Frances Stark.

== Career ==
=== Performance and social practice (2001–2014) ===
Horowitz and Brumit first collaborated on Bay Area events including The One-Minute Show (2001), a 30-artist exhibition that lasted sixty seconds. From June 25 to July 26, 2003, the pair reinvented themselves as Burt Dulet and Kyle Sliv of Sliv & Dulet Enterprises and turned New Langton Arts in San Francisco into a "creative services" office for Sliv & Dulet Present: The Summer Line 2003, inviting twenty-three artists to work there in weeklong shifts developing a "summer line of products and services," which they pitched to local businesses. Proposals included a fog removal initiative for the Golden Gate Bridge, a full-service office in a tent, and a Swiss Army Cubicle. In June 2004, for Errand Feasibility Study, Horowitz ran errands across San Francisco riding a mule, followed by a pack donkey, a police escort and a news crew.

While working as a photographer's assistant on a Crate & Barrel catalog shoot in 2004, Horowitz wrote "dinner w/ marc" and his cell phone number on a dry-erase board in a home-office photograph. After the fall 2004 catalog was distributed, he received hundreds of calls within a month, and in early 2005 he set out in a used RV on The National Dinner Tour, having dinner with callers across the country; the calls eventually numbered around 30,000. People included him in its June 2005 list of the 50 most eligible bachelors.

Press coverage of the Dinner Tour, including an appearance on Today, led the William Morris Agency to sign Horowitz, and the agency placed him in commercials and branded projects; Hyperallergic later described him as the first visual artist to be represented by an entertainment agency. In 2006 Nissan and its agency TBWA\Chiat\Day built the launch of the redesigned Nissan Sentra around him: he lived in the car for seven days while cameras recorded all 168 hours, under rules requiring him to sleep somewhere new each night, cook at least four meals near the car, go on at least one date and host a "social function" inside it. The 7 Days in a Sentra campaign ran across television, print, outdoor, YouTube, a blog, MySpace and an island in Second Life; its budget was reported at $40–55 million.

In 2007 Horowitz showed versions of The Center for Improved Living at AMT Gallery in Como, Italy, Galerie Analix Forever in Geneva and Galerie Nuke in Paris. From March 18 to April 13, 2008, as part of the Hayward Gallery's Laughing in a Foreign Language season, he turned the Hayward Gallery Project Space in London into The Centre for Improved Living, a combined television set and screening room where he broadcast a live talk show, Me and You, three days a week and offered workshops, a swap shop and one-on-one life coaching.

In the summer of 2008, Horowitz made The Signature Series, a 20-episode web series for Sony Pictures' Crackle, driving across America along the shape of his signature. During the trip, Horowitz made 19 stops. For one of the stops, he started an "Anonymous Semi-nudist Colony" in Nampa, Idaho. He stopped in Craig, Colorado to bury people's problems in a public park plot. He also made a commercial for his high school. For his last stop, on July 4, 2008, Horowitz froze a briefcase inside a 7-foot-tall (2.1 m) patriotic ice sculpture at Wrightsville Beach and challenged passers-by to guess when the ice would melt. The winner was awarded the briefcase and the surprise inside.

During December 2008, Horowitz attempted to bail out the US's banks by creating action paintings that he gave to various banks to sell at auctions.

From November 2008 through February 2009, Horowitz broadcast his life live online around the clock as Talkshow 24/7, mixing scripted segments with everyday life and an audience chatroom.

From August 10 through August 18, 2009, Peter Baldes and Horowitz made a live-streamed virtual cross-country road trip, calling it "Google Maps Road Trip." Using only Google Maps, they drove from Los Angeles to Richmond, Virginia. They were interviewed by NPR's Weekend Edition about the trip. They streamed live on ustream.tv.

From November 1–30, 2010, with support from Creative Time, Horowitz crowdsourced his daily decisions on his The Advice of Strangers website, where visitors voted in real time on the choices he made each day. That month he was one of 25 artists, chosen from more than 9,000 applicants, awarded AOL's $25,000 25 for 25 grant.

Horowitz has lectured at Yale, Berkeley, CalArts and Portland State, among other universities, and gave a TEDx talk in Lake Como, Italy, in November 2012. He has taught internet and new media art at USC and at Otis College of Art and Design, where he taught with Cortright. In February 2014, while teaching an internet-art course at USC, he publicly claimed authorship of "Dumb Starbucks", a parody coffee shop in Los Feliz, as part of a class lesson on appropriation; hours later the comedian Nathan Fielder revealed it as a stunt for Nathan for You. Horowitz described the claim itself as the artwork.

His film Moving, in which two pink creatures confined to a small room hack apart a large block, was presented at Aran Cravey gallery in Los Angeles in September 2013 and was an official selection of the 2014 Slamdance Film Festival.

=== Painting and performance (2015–present) ===
In 2015 Horowitz released hCoin, a virtual currency and e-commerce site, and turned to painting and sculpture. His first solo exhibition with a U.S. institution, Interior, Day (A Door Opens), ran at the Depart Foundation in Los Angeles from October 8 to December 19, 2015; its paintings and junk-shop-altered classical sculptures took their titles from the screenplays of The Matrix and Solaris. With it he published an artist's book photographing every page of a Phillips contemporary art auction catalog strewn with junk-food residue. Curator Lindsay Howard interviewed him for Hyperallergic about the shift from internet performance to painting, and Christopher Michno surveyed his career for Artillery.

In 2016 he showed paintings and sculpture in (Complaining): It's Surprisingly Beautiful in Here at Johannes Vogt in New York (May 3–29), Dawn of the Zone at China Art Objects in Los Angeles (September) and The Hall. Studio at Mannerheim Gallery in Paris, where 19th-century American compositions were interrupted by bursts of color and abstracted figures. In 2017 he launched an online archive of his work, designed by the studio HAWRAF, that viewers explore by calling 1-833-MAR-CIVE and dialing a project number to hear him talk about it.

Later exhibitions included Thank you. That was most illuminating. at COMA in Sydney (March 2017), A Discord in Our Material and Spiritual Harmony at Johannes Vogt (September 2017), Ever Gold [Projects] in San Francisco (2017 and 2019) and a 2018 two-person exhibition with Petra Cortright at BANK/MABSOCIETY in Shanghai. For Nothing on the Other Side of the Slash at Johannes Vogt (March 2019) he made paintings derived from Demna Gvasalia's Balenciaga advertisements, torn from T magazine. If it's not mine, it's mine at Jonathan Hopson in Houston (2019) drew on research from the Roman ruins at Milreu, Portugal, and Blinky Palermo's paintings at Dia.

In TIME POOLS at Mindy Solomon Gallery in Miami (August 2020), oil and gouache paintings carried sewn transparent film overlays holding collage, photographs and found objects that shift as the works are moved. Zucchette Vettii, a two-person exhibition with Cortright at L21 Gallery in Palma de Mallorca, ran from November 2020 to February 2021, and High Stakes, shown in 2023 at Guesthouse, the Jackson Hole studio space run by Camille Obering Fine Art, paired paintings built from vintage ski advertisements, 8-bit video games and 16th-century old master imagery with a cast-aluminum bust of an aging skier. He has described a hybrid studio process in which he builds a physical painting, photographs and digitally manipulates it, prints the result and paints over it again.

Performance has remained part of the work. The Aesthetics of Stability (de boer, Los Angeles, 2022) combined new versions of 17th-century still lifes, a sculpture that had survived a fire, industrial fans, coffee makers and office furniture with a live performance at the opening, around stability and instability in business and personal life. In 2024 Hat & Beard Press published This Will Work, a 300-page career-spanning monograph with an essay by Christina Catherine Martinez, and de boer showed his abstract paintings in Triple Bottom Line (March 16 – April 20, 2024). His short film Don't Tell Peanut (2023), funded through the Nouns DAO, was an official selection in the Artists' Film category of the 2024 Aesthetica Short Film Festival. At the LUMINEX 3.0 public art event in downtown Los Angeles on October 5, 2024, he performed Extremely Limited, in which he had three minutes to make and package a small sculpture before serving it through a window, a piece about time pressure and the demands of productivity.

At the 2025 San Francisco Art Fair, Horowitz opened the fair with a performance and occupied de boer's solo stand as a working studio for the run of the fair, leaving it in disarray and nailing and stapling unstretched canvases to the walls; The Art Newspaper called it a satirical "performance on laziness" and reported that several paintings sold for $25,000 or more. At the fair he also gave a talk on his career, moderated by Daisy Nam, director of the Wattis Institute for Contemporary Arts. At the Atlanta Art Fair in September 2025 he presented Portraits under the name Quarter Gallery, his first portraits in 27 years: nine thickly painted canvases, each 70 inches tall and 2 inches wide, in a booth four feet wide and fourteen feet long that visitors walked through single file, with Horowitz selling the work himself. The Art Newspaper noted he had requested the fair's narrowest booth to suit the work, which it described as portrait "slices". On October 29, 2025, he released Shockline through the platform Verse: 130 works that were his first digital paintings, combining scanned oil paintings and drawings with virtual brushwork.

== Selected solo exhibitions ==
- 2003 – Sliv & Dulet Present: The Summer Line 2003 (with Jon Brumit), New Langton Arts, San Francisco
- 2008 – The Centre for Improved Living, Hayward Gallery Project Space, London
- 2013 – Moving, Aran Cravey, Los Angeles
- 2015 – Interior, Day (A Door Opens), Depart Foundation, Los Angeles
- 2016 – (Complaining): It's Surprisingly Beautiful in Here, Johannes Vogt, New York
- 2016 – Dawn of the Zone, China Art Objects, Los Angeles
- 2016 – The Hall. Studio, Mannerheim Gallery, Paris
- 2017 – Thank you. That was most illuminating., COMA, Sydney
- 2017 – A Discord in Our Material and Spiritual Harmony, Johannes Vogt, New York
- 2017 – "You can't do that to them," the wiser, older Architect said., Ever Gold [Projects], San Francisco
- 2018 – Petra Cortright and Marc Horowitz, BANK/MABSOCIETY, Shanghai
- 2019 – Nothing on the Other Side of the Slash, Johannes Vogt, New York
- 2019 – Frankly, My Dear, I Don't Give a Damn: Selections from the Reel, The Newsstand Project, Los Angeles
- 2019 – If it's not mine, it's mine, Jonathan Hopson, Houston
- 2019 – The Qualitative Validation Principle, Ever Gold [Projects], San Francisco
- 2020 – TIME POOLS, Mindy Solomon Gallery, Miami
- 2020–21 – Zucchette Vettii (with Petra Cortright), L21 Gallery, Palma de Mallorca
- 2022 – The Aesthetics of Stability, de boer, Los Angeles
- 2023 – High Stakes, Guesthouse, Jackson Hole, Wyoming
- 2024 – Triple Bottom Line, de boer, Los Angeles
- 2025 – San Francisco Art Fair, solo presentation with de boer
- 2025 – Portraits, Quarter Gallery, Atlanta Art Fair
- 2025 – Shockline, Verse (online)

== Publications ==
- Marc Horowitz: Phillips Contemporary Art New York Evening Sale 4 May 2015 (artist's book). Nero, 2015.
- This Will Work. Los Angeles: Hat & Beard Press, 2024.

== Awards and grants ==
- 2010 – Creative Time project grant, The Advice of Strangers
- 2010 – AOL 25 for 25 grant

== Personal life ==
Horowitz is married to the artist Petra Cortright.
