= Ryan Trecartin =

American artist and filmmaker (born 1981)

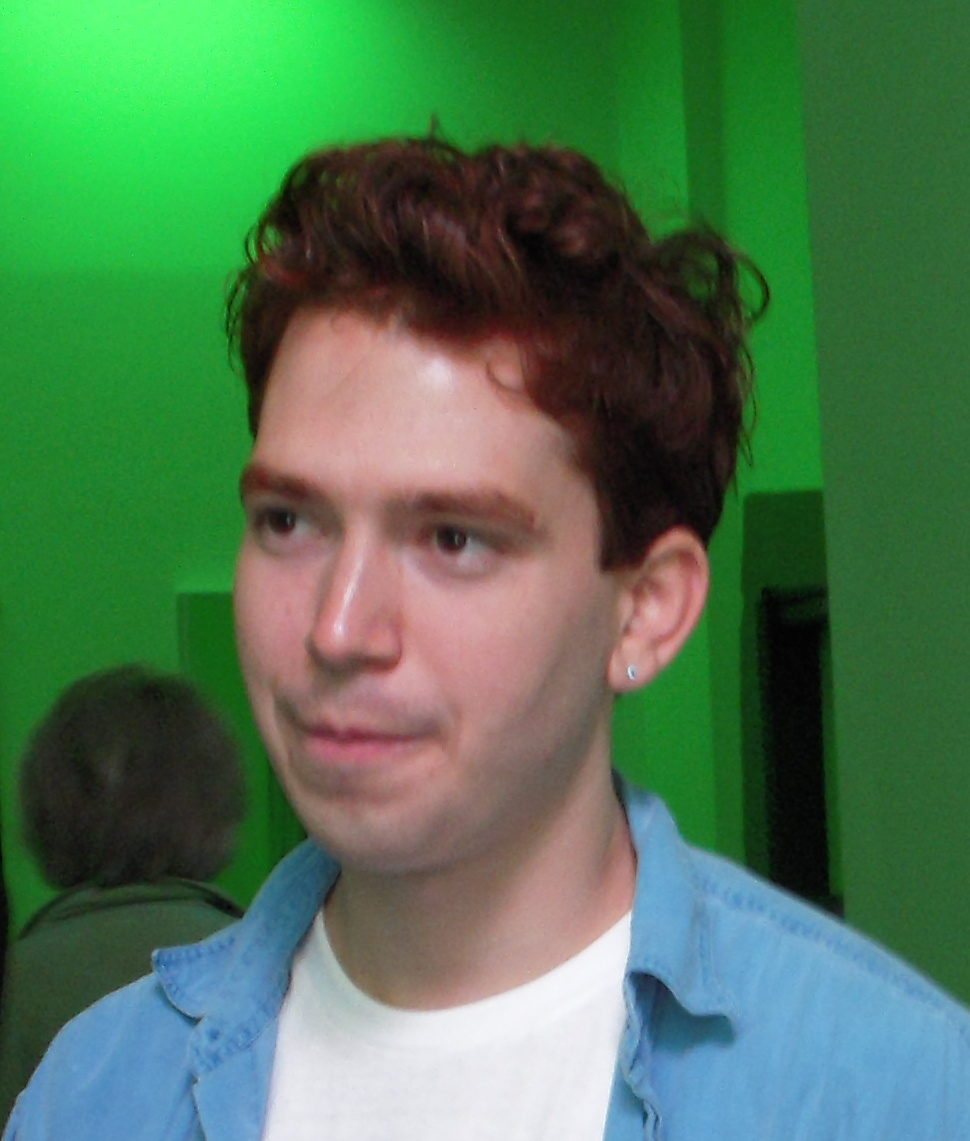
- Trecartin in 2009
- Born: 1981 (age 44–45); Webster, Texas, U.S.
- Education: Rhode Island School of Design (BFA)
- Known for: Video art; sculpture; installation art; new media art
- Notable work: A Family Finds Entertainment 2004; I-Be AREA 2007; Trill-ogy Comp 2009; Any Ever 2010; Center Jenny 2013

Ryan Trecartin (born 1981) is an American artist and filmmaker currently based in Athens, Ohio. He studied at the Rhode Island School of Design, graduating with a BFA in 2004. Trecartin has since lived and worked in New Orleans, Los Angeles, Philadelphia and Miami. His creative partner and long-term collaborator is Lizzie Fitch, an artist with whom he has been working since 2000.

In 2006, the Wall Street Journal included Trecartin in a selection of ten top emerging US artists including Dash Snow, Rosson Crow, Zane Lewis, and Keegan McHargue. Frieze named his 2007 film I-Be Area, No.17 on their list of "The 25 Best Works of the 21st Century". In 2009, Trecartin was the recipient of the inaugural Jack Wolgin International Competition in the Fine Arts, the world's largest juried individual fine art prize, awarded by Tyler School of Art; he received the New Artist of the Year Award at The First Annual Art Awards hosted by the Solomon R. Guggenheim Museum, New York; and he was awarded a 2009 Pew Fellowship in the Arts.

His work is featured in the Saatchi Gallery collection and has appeared in many museum exhibitions including The Generational: Younger Than Jesus at The New Museum in New York City, Queer Voice at the ICA in Philadelphia, Between Two Deaths at the Center for Art and Media in Karlsruhe, and the 2006 Whitney Biennial, as well as in recent solo exhibitions at The Power Plant in Toronto, and the Museum of Contemporary Art, Los Angeles, among others.

== Early life ==
Ryan Trecartin was born in Webster, Texas, and spent most of his childhood in Ohio. His mother was a homemaker and then a teacher, and his dad was a steelworker. Although he was not exposed to the world of high art until college, Trecartin was interested in performance from a young age. In high school, he would build sets and costumes, write music, and dance and act with his friends.

After graduating from high school, Trecartin "decided to apply to art school because it seemed like a place where people can have creative freedom and easily move between different mediums and cultural discussions." In 2000, Trecartin enrolled in the Rhode Island School of Design, where he met Lizzie Fitch, who would become his longtime collaborator and creative partner. Trecartin graduated in 2004 with a BFA. Fitch appears in many of Trecartin's early videos, such as Wayne's World (2003).

== Work ==
=== A Family Finds Entertainment ===
Trecartin's first major work, A Family Finds Entertainment, was finished his senior year of college and first screened at the college's auditorium. The video was posted on his Friendster page and DVD copies were sold. Although there are several versions of this story, one of the DVDs made it to artist Sue de Beer's hands who then showed it to New Museum curator Rachel Greene. In 2006, Trecartin was the youngest artist to present at the Whitney Biennial. The film stars Laura Colella, Patrick Thompson, Lizzie Fitch, Lindsey Beebe, and others.

=== I-Be Area, 2007 ===
Trecartin's second major work, and his first feature-length film, I-Be Area, starring Trecartin himself, frequent collaborator and friend Lizzie Fitch, along with Mecca Vazie Andrews, Jasmine Albuquerque, Tara Brook, Samuel Adrian III, and more, was finished in 2007. Trecartin completed the film while obtaining his master's degree at RISD. Elizabeth Dee worked as well to co-produce eight films with Trecartin, including I-Be Area.

The work debuted in 2007 at Elizabeth Dee Gallery in New York City. The film was also displayed in the Solomon R. Guggenheim Museum collection. It was greeted with a "joyous critical consensus rarely seen in the art world."

The film has become beloved in the experimental film world, and has inspired the works of other experimental artists. In 2012, experimental hip hop group Death Grips sampled soundbites from the film in their song "@DeathGripz", and their song Whammy off of No Love Deep Web. Holland Cotter of the New York Times described subversive nature of the work in his 2008 write up; "... it told a story, one with dozens of characters and multiple subplots, which is what entertainment, not art, is supposed to do, if you assume there’s a hard and fast difference between the two."

Frieze named the work No.17 on their list of "The 25 Best Works of the 21st Century".

=== Process ===
One of the important aspects of Trecartin's work is his emphasis on collaboration as an integral element of creative process. Lizzie Fitch explains that since their early days at Rhode Island School of Design the two of them were always looking for ways to transcend the boundaries of mediums through collaboration. For example, they would try to see how they could create sculptures that worked as other things than sculptures, or "a movie conceived as a movie and as something to be shared socially as a container to hold other artworks." Fitch also remarks that "one of the most striking things about Ryan is how naturally he opens up his rigorous, focused vision to working with others."

Trecartin remarked in an interview with Cindy Sherman that "it's important to me that the traditional director-actor hierarchy disappear into the work." He sees authorship as "a fluid space and collaboration as an inherent, connective reality." Comparisons have been drawn to The Factory, but Trecartin has rejected the similarity, and emphasizes that his work is much more pluralized.

=== Influences ===
Although critics have made various comparisons to other video artists, such as John Waters, Andy Warhol, and Jack Smith, Trecartin has repeatedly stated that fine art was never a major source of inspiration for his work. Randy Kennedy, an art writer for The New York Times, remarked that Trecartin was unaware of the artists he was being compared to when he first heard of them. Per Trecartin: "Contemporary art or artists alone have never been a main catalyst for me to want to make art. I've been more inspired by how language is used—in culture generally, whether in casual conversation or various forms of media—or by music, TV, dance, and movies…I never think about disentangling moments from my cumulative experience of culture that may have influenced me the most… it means more in its blended entirety than it does a series of key experiences or authors." Trecartin also cites The Disney Channel and Dirty Dancing as being sources of inspiration for his films in an interview with The New York Times. Trecartin is also quoted saying "When I was young and my baby sitters came over and turned on music videos, I was inspired by that."

=== Reception ===
Critics and writers have often struggled to describe Trecartin's work as it straddles the line between multiple mediums, drawing from an eclectic multitude of sources while moving at a frenetic, almost chaotic pace. As art dealer and curator Jeffrey Deitch describes, "His art is not about formal self-definition but about an embrace of the connections between different media and between progressive art and popular culture." Deitch goes on to say that Trecartin "has brought a new level of complexity to the question of when life becomes art and art becomes life… He is one of the first artists whose work looks and feels like life today." Howard Halle writes, "the plots are slippery and almost non-narrative, but his style is so original and refreshing that the work could never be called boring. Often, in fact, it's downright thrilling." From Brian Droitcour: "To find another artist who engages a plurality of art forms with simultaneous, equal intensity—all while rethinking what art is and how it touches its audience—you'd have to go back to Wagner."

== Filmography ==
- "Kitchen Girl" (2001)
- "Valentine's Day Girl" (2001)
- "Yo! A Romantic Comedy" (2001)
- "Wayne's World" (2003)
- "What's the Love Making Babies For" (2003)
- A Family Finds Entertainment (2004)
- "(Tommy Chat Just E-mailed Me.)" (2006)
- I-Be Area (2007)
- Trill-ogy Comp (2009)

- "K-CoreaINC. K (section a)"
- "Sibling Topics (section a)" (2009)
- "P.opular S.ky (section ish)" (2009)

- Re'Search Wait'S (2010)

- "Ready" (2010)
- "The Re'Search" (2010)
- "Roamie View: History Enhancement" (2010)
- "Temp Stop" (2010)

- CENTER JENNY (2013)
- "Comma Boat" (2013)
- "Item Falls" (2013)
- "Junior War" (2013)
- Mark Trade (2016)
- Temple Time (2016)
- Whether Line (Plot Front Edit) (2019)
