= Sue de Beer =

American artist (born 1973)

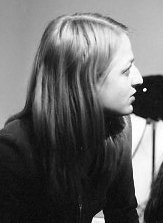
- de Beer in 2005
- Born: August 9, 1973 (age 53); Tarrytown, New York, U.S.
- Education: Parsons; Columbia University
- Known for: Video art; electronic art; new media art; sculpture; installation art; photography
- Website: suedebeer.com

Sue de Beer (born August 9, 1973) is a contemporary artist who lives and works in New York City. De Beer's work is located at the intersection of film, installation, sculpture, and photography, and she is primarily known for her large-scale film-installations.

== Background ==
De Beer received a Bachelor of Fine Arts degree (BFA) from Parsons The New School for Design in New York in 1995 and a Master of Fine Arts (MFA) from Columbia University in 1998.

== Early life and education ==
De Beer was raised in New England, and lives in New York. She cites the aesthetic of 1700 and 1900 New England as an early influence on her work:

Growing up in a rambling Victorian house with a widow's walk near Salem, Mass., which still exudes an air of its witchy past, she felt that mysticism was a kind of birthright, and it has been a more prominent element of her work in recent years. Ms. de Beer has also borrowed from the dark, violent post-religious mysticism of the novelist Dennis Cooper. (From his novel "Period," used in a 2005 de Beer video: "I could open the other dimension right now if I wanted. Or I could stay here with you. I'm kind of like a god.")

Time itself is the most often repeated subject of de Beer's work, emerging from images and ideas related to the passage of time. Ghosts, haunting, adolescence, trace memory and erasure find a common ground within this theme.

Ms. de Beer said that her fascination with ghosts is in one sense simply about finding a way to explore how we all must deal with the past and with loss as we grow older, a struggle that finds a metaphor in the artistic process itself.

De Beer lived in Berlin, Germany between 2002-2008. She produced and shot three films in Berlin: 'Hans & Grete' (2003), 'Black Sun' (2005), and 'the Quickening' (2006).

== Works ==
- Hans & Grete
- Disappear Here
- Black Sun
- The Quickening
- Permanent Revolution
- The Ghosts
- Haunt Room
- The Blue Lenses
- The White Wolf

== Career ==
Her work has been the subject of several major solo exhibitions including "Hans & Grete", at the Kunst-Werke, Berlin, "Black Sun", at the Whitney Museum of American Art at Altria, "Permanent Revolution" at the MuHKA Museum in Antwerp, Belgium, and "the Ghosts" at the Park Avenue Armory in New York. She has exhibited widely in the United States and abroad at venues including but not limited to the New Museum of Contemporary Art, the Whitney Museum of American Art, MoMA PS1, the Brooklyn Museum, the Park Avenue Armory, and Marianne Boesky Gallery in New York, Los Angeles Contemporary Exhibitions in Los Angeles, the Reina Sofia in Madrid, the Kunst-Werke, the Zentrum für Kunst und Medientechnologie, and the Schirn Kunsthalle Frankfurt in Germany, the Neue Galerie am Landesmuseum Joanneum in Graz, Austria, the MuHKA Museum in Antwerp, Belgium, and the Museum of Modern Art, Busan, in Busan, South Korea.

De Beer's work has been associated with New Gothic Art.

De Beer is an associate professor in the Art Department of New York University Steinhardt.
