= Issy Wood =

American artist (born 1993)

Issy Wood (born 1993) is an American-born British artist known for her paintings and pop music who lives and works in London, England.

== Music ==
Wood released an EP, Cries Real Tears!, in 2020 with Zelig Records. She released a second EP, If It's Any Constellation, on April 13, 2021. In 2022, Wood released My Body Your Choice.

== Collections ==
Wood's work is included in the collections of the Institute of Contemporary Art (Miami), the Rhode Island School of Design Museum (Providence), the Sifang Art Museum (Nanjing), the Zabludowicz Collection & and the National Portrait Gallery (London).

== Exhibits ==
- 2022 – Issy Wood: Time Sensitive – Michael Werner Gallery, New York
