= Petra Cortright =

American artist

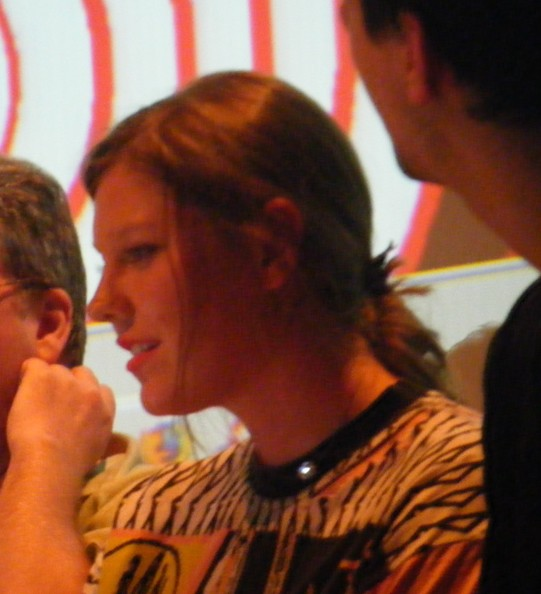
- Cortright in 2008
- Born: 1986 (age 39–40)
- Occupation: Artist
- Movement: Internet art, Post-Internet, painting, digital painting, video art

Petra Cortright (born 1986) is an American artist working in video, painting, and digital media.

== Biography ==
Petra Cortright was born in 1986 in Santa Barbara, California. Cortright is the daughter of two artists; her father who died when she was four, Steven Cortright, was a sculptor/printmaker and art professor at UC Santa Barbara, and her mother is a painter. She studied at California College of the Arts in San Francisco (2004) and Parsons The New School for Design in New York (2008). She lives and works in Los Angeles, California. She first came to notice through her self-portrait videos that she uploaded to YouTube.

== Video works ==
Cortright is well known for her video works presented on YouTube and in gallery environments. Her videos playfully explore formal properties of video software and the representation of physical bodies in digital spaces.

In vvebcam (2007, collection, Museum of Modern Art), Cortright filmed herself while playing with the special effects features built into the webcam software used to make the video. On Saturday, December 10, 2011, vvebcam (2007) was removed by YouTube because of Cortright's extensive use of "offensive" key words. "Vvebcam is a portrait of the artist as a computer user whose primary mode of existence is recording and being watched".

In 2011 Cortright collaborated with Ilia Ovechkin to create Video Catalog, a work where the monetary value of her videos is determined by an algorithm based on YouTube views.

Vicky Deep in Spring Valley (2012) marks the beginning of Cortright's video work with virtual strippers. Cortright lifts the dancing girls from VirtuaGirl, a software that makes chroma keyed footage of "strippers" available for download. These videos are layered against flash images of fantastical digital worlds that are reminiscent of animated desktop wallpaper. A 2015 exhibition at Depart Foundation in Los Angeles titled Niki, Lucy, Lola, Viola included cropped_masked_final, a new video work incorporating characters sourced from VirtuaGirl.

Cortright was selected to participate in the 2013 Frieze Art Fair in London where she produced her self-portrait, Bridal Shower (2013), a film where she experiments with the physical qualities of a production studio. The film was subsequently broadcast on British public television station Channel 4.

In 2014, Cortright began a collaboration with fashion designer Stella McCartney, creating a series of videos where Cortright uses glitches and video manipulation to showcase and contrast patterns on the garments designed by McCartney that she models.

== Digital paintings ==
In 2011 Cortright had her first solo exhibition, So Wet, organized by Gerardo Contreras at Preteen Gallery in Mexico City. Digital images created on the computer were printed on fabric and loosely hung on the walls evocative of the, onshore breeze, warm winters and cool summers of her hometown Santa Barbara. These were unlike previous online works. They were out of context and yet characteristic of a new generation of Post-Internet artists.

Cortright continued to assemble collages on the computer, layer on layer, from images found on-line, through raster image manipulations and the addition of painterly digital brushstrokes. The intricate paintings which blend figurative and abstract elements, are printed on a variety of materials—most frequently linen, paper, and aluminum. Each of Cortright's paintings begin with a digital file that the artist refers to as a "mother file," which consists of hundreds of layers that are subsequently printed on a substrate through industrial print processes. Often her works are titled to reflect file names and extensions, as well as search terms used to source found imagery.

== Feminism in work ==
According to Petra Cortright, she is a feminist by virtue of being a woman but she prefers to not have her work condensed to that categorization. Nonetheless, Cortright has a wide range of work that involves her playing with female stereotypes using readily available consumer software to produce "selfies". This was before selfies became ubiquitous and made her videos precursors to the smartphone era. In her early works, Cortright used tags like "vagina", "boobs" and "butts" to gain viewers.

== Selected exhibitions ==
Cortright's works have been shown at the New Museum in New York, Rhizome, the Venice Biennale, the 2010 01SJ Biennial in San Jose, California, and the 12ième Biennale d'art contemporain de Lyon. Her work is in the permanent collections of the Museum of Modern Art (New York), Péréz Museum (Miami), the Los Angeles County Museum of Art, the Hammer Museum (Los Angeles), the Moderna Museet (Stockholm), the MOTI (Breda) in collaboration with the Stedelijk Museum (Amsterdam), the Museum of Contemporary Art Chicago, the Kadist Foundation (San Francisco), BAMPFA (Berkeley, CA), and the San Jose Museum of Art, and the Museum of Contemporary Art, Los Angeles. Cortright's work was included in Paddles On!, the first auction dedicated to digital art hosted by a major auction house (Paddle8, July 2014).

== Awards ==
In 2015 she was awarded Rhizome's Future-Proof award with Paul Chan & Badlands.

== Personal life ==
Cortright is married to Marc Horowitz.

== See also ==
Post-Internet

== Bibliography ==
- Bianconi, Giampaolo and Chan, Paul (2021) Petra Cortright Milan: Skira
- Capps, Kriston (January 20, 2009) "New-media artist Petra Cortright explores digital artwork in Dallas exhibit" Dallas Morning News.
- Chatel, Marie (November 15, 2018) "In Focus: Petra Cortright" Danae (retrieved April 10, 2021)
- DeNorch, Dan (August 25, 2008) "Young Curators, New Ideas " ARTCAL The Zine.
- Johnson, Paddy (March 27, 2007) "Petra Cortright's Webcam Video " artfagcity
- Kretowicz, Steph (January 20, 2014) "Our ten favourite digifeminist artists" (retrieved April 10, 2021)
- Langmuir, Molly (July 10, 2018) "Why Should A Webcam Plus A Woman Equal Sex? For Petra Cortright, It's Art" Elle (retrieved April 10, 2021)
- Leon de la Barra, Pablo (April 9, 2011) " so wet, petra cortright at Preteen gallery Mexico City" Centre for the Aesthetic Revolution. (retrieved April 10, 2021)
- McKay, Sally (2009) "The Affect of Animated GIFs (Tom Moody, Petra Cortright, Lorna Mills)" art&education papers.
- Sayej, Nadja (February 26, 2018) "petra cortright turns camgirling into feminist art" i-D (retrieved April 10, 2021)
- Sleek team (February 3, 2015) "Petra Cortright on selfies and the feminist question" Sleek, Art & Photography (retrieved April 10, 2021)
- Sterling, Bruce (February 2, 2010). "Petra Cortright is an Internet artist born in 1986 in Santa Barbara, California". Beyond the Beyond. Wired.
- Troudaire, Gregoire (August 27, 2008) "Petra-sans-effet " fluctuat.net
- Williams, Maxwell (November 8, 2013) "For Petra Cortright, the Web Is the Ultimate Canvas." ‘’T Magazine, ‘’New York Times.
