= Lizzie Fitch =

American artist

- Born: 1981 (age 44–45); Bloomington, Indiana, U.S.
- Education: Rhode Island School of Design
- Known for: Sculpture; performance; Installation art; New media art; Video art

Lizzie Fitch (born 1981) is an American artist who works in the mediums of sculpture, video, performance, and installation art. She graduated from Rhode Island School of Design in 2004. Her long-term collaborator is Ryan Trecartin; their videos, including the series "Any Ever" (2010), have been widely exhibited internationally. She currently lives and works in Los Angeles, California, where she co-runs Fitch-Trecartin Studios.

Her sculpture and installation work, which has doubled as sets and props in videos and performances, often combines consumer products and prefabricated furniture into architectural assemblages. Her performance work includes "The Experimental People Band," a performance group that has performed at the New York Underground Film Festival (2005) and the Portland Institute for Contemporary Art (2008)

She has had solo shows in New Galerie in Paris, Foxy Productions and Elizabeth Dee Gallery in New York, Crane Arts Center and QED Gallery in Los Angeles. Her collaborations with Ryan Trecartin have been seen at MAMA (Rotterdam), MoMA PS1 (New York), Musée d'Art Moderne de la Ville de Paris, New Galerie, and Cour Carrée du Louvre (Paris), and the 2013 Venice Biennale.
