= List of new media artists =

This is a list of new media artists who work primarily in the medium of the new media art.

== A ==
- American Artist
- Andrea Ackerman
- Annie Abrahams
- Robert Adrian
- Morehshin Allahyari
- Miguel Álvarez-Fernández
- Carlos Amorales
- Anna Anthropy
- Cory Arcangel
- Kim Albrecht
- Deborah Aschheim
- Roy Ascott

== B ==
- Aram Bartholl
- Sandra Becker
- Zoe Beloff
- Maurice Benayoun
- Wafaa Bilal
- Jeremy Blake
- Guy Bleus
- Maurizio Bolognini
- Andrea Bonaceto
- Sylvia Grace Borda
- Candice Breitz
- Veronika Bromová
- Nia Burks
- Oleg Buryan

== C ==
- C6.org
- F. Lennox Campello
- Micha Cárdenas
- Janet Cardiff
- Shu Lea Cheang
- Jennifer Chan (artist)
- Brody Condon
- Petra Cortright
- Vuk Ćosić
- Beatriz da Costa
- Andrea Crespo
- Amanda Cox
- Donna Cox
- Critical Art Ensemble
- Nick Crowe

== D ==
- Sharon Daniel
- Char Davies
- Ronald Davis
- Heiko Daxl
- Linda Dement
- Danny Devos
- Heather Dewey-Hagborg
- Marco Donnarumma
- R. Luke DuBois

== E ==
- Electronic Disturbance Theater
- Arthur Elsenaar
- David Em
- Ursula Endlicher

== F ==
- Ken Feingold
- Thomas Feuerstein
- Mary Flanagan
- Amy Franceschini
- Monika Fleischmann
- Anna Frants
- Peter Foldes
- Fred Forest
- Ingeborg Fülepp

== G ==
- Carla Gannis
- Rick Gibson
- Ken Goldberg
- Guillermo Gómez-Peña
- Johannes Grenzfurthner
- greyworld
- Genco Gulan

== H ==
- Claudia Hart
- Auriea Harvey
- Agnes Hegedüs
- Kurt Hentschlager
- Lynn Hershman
- Garnet Hertz
- Andreas Heusser
- Gary Hill
- Perry Hoberman
- Tiffany Holmes
- Marc Horowitz
- Brian House
- G. H. Hovagimyan
- Jonty Hurwitz

== I ==
- Ryoji Ikeda
- Toshio Iwai
- Neema Iyer

== J ==
- Helen Varley Jamieson
- E. Jane
- Daniel Jolliffe

== K ==
- Eduardo Kac
- Allan Kaprow
- Kimchi and Chips
- John Klima (artist)
- Mario Klingemann
- KMA
- Knifeandfork
- Knowbotic Research
- Aaron Koblin
- Igor Kopystiansky
- Svetlana Kopystiansky
- Myron Krueger
- Petri Kuljuntausta
- Ryota Kuwakubo

== L ==
- LaBeouf, Rönkkö & Turner
- Antoinette LaFarge
- Steve Lambert
- Ulf Langheinrich
- Tomas Laurenzo
- Marc Lee
- Jan Robert Leegte
- Golan Levin
- Jaime Levy
- Jen Lewin
- LIA
- Olia Lialina
- Patrick Lichty
- Lin Hsin Hsin
- Marita Liulia
- Teddy Lo
- Andy Lomas
- Gretta Louw
- Rafael Lozano-Hemmer
- Garrett Lynch

== M ==
- John Maeda
- Michael Takeo Magruder
- Judy Malloy
- Sergio Maltagliati
- Michael Mandiberg
- Miltos Manetas
- Lev Manovich
- Cathy Marshall
- Mauro Martino
- Eva and Franco Mattes
- Rita McKeough
- Christina McPhee
- Yucef Merhi
- Elle Mehrmand
- Bjørn Melhus
- Neil Mendoza
- Rosa Menkman
- Eric Millikin
- Christian Moeller
- Francesco Monico
- monochrom
- Manfred Mohr
- Joshua Mosley
- Leonel Moura
- Liz Mputu

== N ==
- Michael Naimark
- Mark Napier (artist)
- Joseph Nechvatal
- Kingsley Ng
- Carsten Nicolai
- Graham Nicholls
- Nsumi

== O ==
- Mendi & Keith Obadike
- Erwin Olaf
- Marisa Olson
- Anuska Oosterhuis
- Joseph Stanislaus Ostoja-Kotkowski

== P ==
- Nam June Paik
- Zaven Paré
- Chiara Passa
- Eric Paulos
- Simon Penny
- Maja Petrić
- Dani Ploeger
- Andrea Polli
- Jim Pomeroy

== R ==
- Sabrina Raaf
- Melinda Rackham
- Catherine Richards
- Ken Rinaldo
- Don Ritter
- David Rokeby
- Gustavo Romano
- Daniel Rozin
- Stepan Ryabchenko

== S ==
- Jason Salavon
- Daan Samson
- Ellen Sandor
- Thyra Schmidt
- Antoine Schmitt
- Lillian Schwartz
- Adrien Segal
- Paul Sermon
- Marie Sester
- Jeffrey Shaw
- Laila Shereen Sakr
- Alexei Shulgin
- Scott Snibbe
- Anne Morgan Spalter
- Jonas Staal
- Stelarc
- Igor Štromajer
- System D-128

== T ==
- Tim Tate
- Tamiko Thiel
- Helen Thorington
- Tinkebell
- Thomson & Craighead
- Elena Tejada-Herrera
- Kenneth Tin-Kin Hung
- Timo Toots
- Ryan Trecartin
- Suzanne Treister

== U ==
- Ubermorgen
- Amalia Ulman
- Camille Utterback

== V ==
- Bill Viola
- VNS Matrix
- Wolf Vostell

== W ==
- Addie Wagenknecht
- Tamás Waliczky
- Lee Walton
- Noah Wardrip-Fruin
- Angela Washko
- Martin Wattenberg
- Gillian Wearing
- Norman White
- Nanette Wylde

== Z ==
- Pedro Zaz

== See also ==
- Interactive Art
- Interactive Media
- Artmedia
- ISEA International
