= Sharon H. Venne =

Cree academic

- masko-nôcokwêsiw manitoukan

Academic background
- Education: University of Saskatchewan; University of Victoria; University of Alberta (L.L.M., 1997)
- Thesis: Our Elders Understand Our Rights: Evolving International Law Regarding Indigenous Peoples (1997)

Sharon H. Venne-Manyfingers (Cree: masko-nôcokwêsiw manitoukan) is a Canadian scholar and activist for the implementation of traditional First Nations legal systems. She belongs to the Muskeg Lake Cree Nation on Treaty 6 territory in Saskatchewan.

== Education ==
Venne is a PhD candidate in the history department of the University of Alberta. She began her educational career in 1974 with an Arts Certificate from Malaspina College. She then went on to complete an Honors Bachelor of Arts at the University of Victoria, followed by a Bachelor of Native Law at the University of Saskatchewan and a Bachelor of Law (LLB) at the University of Victoria in 1979. Venne was the first First Nations person to earn a Masters of Law degree (LLM) from the University of Alberta when she graduated in 1987.

== Career ==
Venne was a research associate at the Native Law Centre, University of Saskatchewan from 1979-1980. She has lectured on the recognition of Indigenous rights under the Western law paradigm and has helped many First Nations in Canada contend self-determination through the implementation of their own traditional legal systems. Venne was the Returning Officer for the Lubicon Lake Indian Nation Election, held on April 25, 1999.

Since 1981, Venne has been involved with the United Nations, attending the Commission on Human Rights for about 13 years. She has attended conferences on the implementation of the International Year for Indigenous Peoples and meetings of the Commission on Sustainable Development. The Court for Intergenerational Climate Crimes (CICC), an art installation collaboration between the Dutch artist Jonas Staal and the Indian writer, lawyer, and activist Radha D'Souza, was created by Framer Framed. Venne was one of four judges overseeing the mock trials.

== Awards and achievements ==
She was one of the first Indigenous persons to attend Law School at the University of Victoria in 1976. She was also the first Indigenous person ever to graduate with a Masters of Law degree from the University of Alberta.

== Publications ==
- Sharon Venne (1981) Indian Act and Amendments 1868–1975, University of Saskatchewan.
- Sharon Venne (1990) ‘The New Language of Assimilation: A Brief Analysis of ILO 169’2 Without Prejudice 53.
- Venne, Sharon Helen (1998). Our elders understand our rights: evolving international law regarding indigenous peoples (Thesis). ISBN 978-0-612-21232-9. OCLC 46549463.
- Venne, Sharon H (January 2011). "The Road to the United Nations and Rights of Indigenous Peoples". Griffith Law Review. 20 (3): 557–577. doi:10.1080/10383441.2011.10854710. S2CID 154967410.

=== Chapters ===
- Venne, Sharon (1997). "7 Understanding Treaty 6: An Indigenous Perspective". In Asch, Michael (ed.). Aboriginal and Treaty Rights in Canada. De Gruyter Brill.
- DePasquale, Paul W., ed. (2007). Natives and Settlers Now and Then: Historical Issues and Current Perspectives on Treaties and Land Claims in Canada.
- Venne, Sharon (2017). "How governments manufacture consent and use it against Indigenous Peoples". Indigenous Peoples as Subjects of International Law. pp. 141–170. doi:10.4324/9781315628318-8. ISBN 978-1-315-62831-8.

== Personal life ==
Venne is by marriage a member of the Blood Tribe within Treaty 7. She is a mother to her son Adam and a grandmother.
