= Junichi Kakizaki =

Japanese artist (1971–2026)

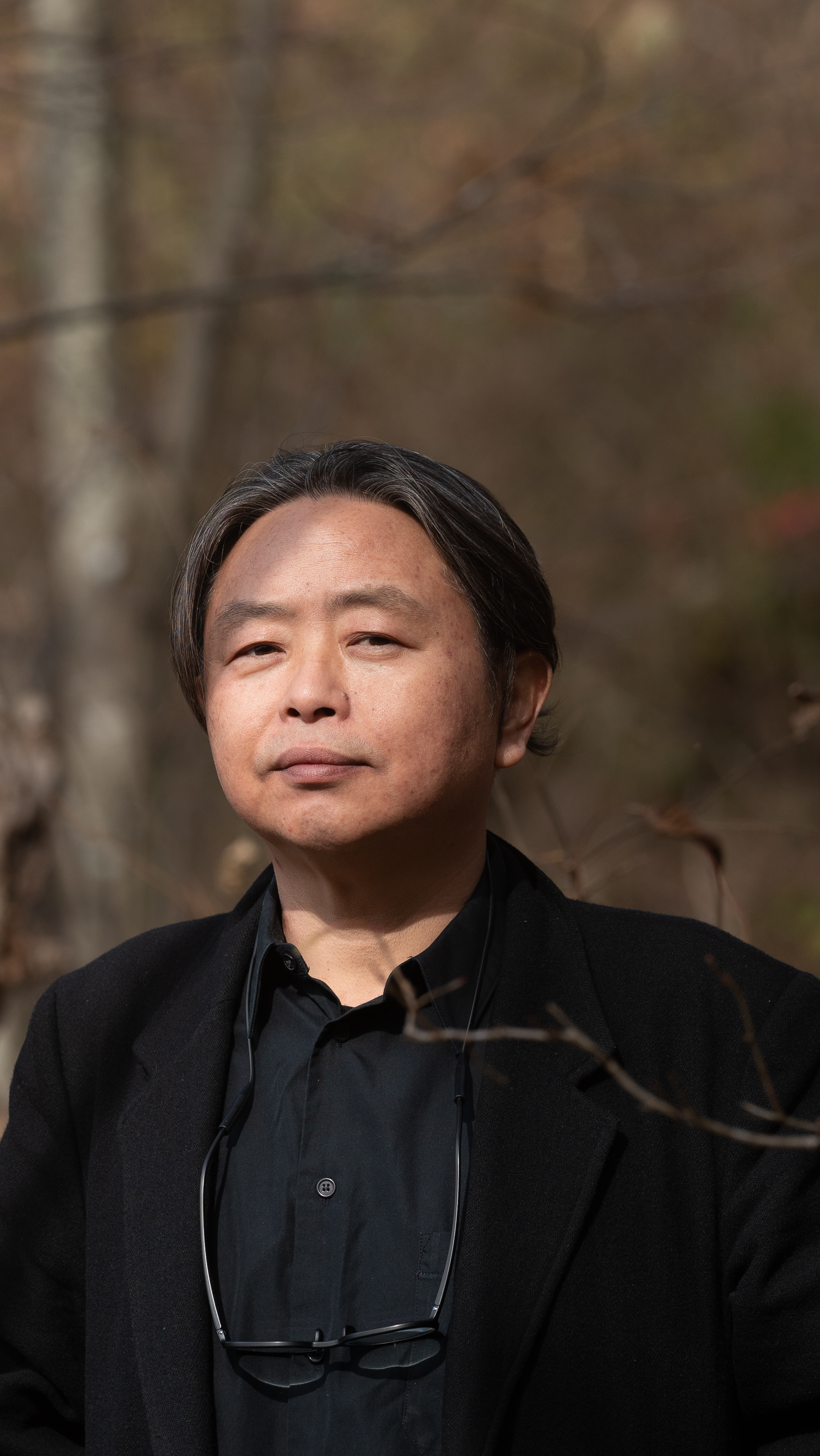
- Junichi Kakizaki in Azumino 2021
- Born: Junichi Kakizaki; January 4, 1971; Nagano, Japan
- Died: June 2026 (aged 55)
- Known for: Contemporary art
- Movement: Floral art, Nature art, Land art, Environmental art, Media art
- Awards: Nippon Flower Designers' Association The chief director award (1995, 1997); All Japan Florists Association of the chairman award (1997); Japan Vocational Ability Development Association of the flower decoration skills chairman award (2001, 2002, 2003); TV Champion the 5th National Florist Championship victory prize (2003); Special academy award of the Ito Gakuen (2003), Others.

Junichi Kakizaki (柿崎 順一, Kakizaki Jun'ichi; January 4, 1971 – June 2026) was a Japanese artist, sculptor, floral and nature artist, land artist, environmental artist, and media artist. He exhibits regularly both in Japan and internationally, mainly in Sweden. Since 1992, he has mainly worked on scenography. He brought a floral design representation in area of contemporary art, and worked with several artists across different art fields. His daughter, Memi, is a former member of Japanese idol group Hinatazaka46.

== Life and career ==
=== Early life ===
Kakizaki was born in Chikuma City of Nagano, Japan, on January 4, 1971. He was a floral designer from 1990.His first solo exhibition was in 2003, the same year he won TV Tokyo's National Florist Championship in the programme TV Champion.

=== Early career ===
Kakizaki's design career started with a job at Serendipity Design in Tokyo where he worked on films, television programmes, and promotional videos. In 1992 his floral art exhibition "Flower and green for the town" was held at Yagihashi department store. This exhibition was done to commemorate 95 years since the establishment of the store in Kumagaya City, Saitama Prefecture. In 1993 he became an assistant to Interflora World Cup champion Fumihiko Muramatsu in Shizuoka City. In 1995 he took part in the Hase-dera art project in Nagano and then took charge of the stage decorations of a concert of many artists, including Eiichi Arai, Shonosuke Okura, Lee Jeongmi, Lebun Kamuy, Hasbaator, Un-Ryu, and the members of Kodo.

=== Scenography utilizing flower design for butoh dance performances ===
Kakizaki designed scenography utilizing flower design for the butoh performances the "Kazuo Ohno Butoh at Hasedera" by Kazuo Ohno and Yoshito Ohno (1999) and "Kazuo Ohno Butoh at Hasedera 2000" by Kazuo Ohno and conceptual artist Yutaka Matsuzawa (2000). In 2002 he was part of a team responsible for the floral designs for "2 New Dance Pieces" by the Richard Hart's Guren Dance Theater. He founded Floridance with Hart in the same year. Foridance has performed many times, mainly in Nagano. He designed the scenography for the butoh dance production "New Life", commissioned by Swedish king and the city of Uppsala, performed at Vaksala torg in Uppsala, Sweden and Swedish Embassy in Roppongi, Tokyo (2007).

=== Death ===
On September 15, 2026, it was announced that Kakizaki had died in June. He was 55.

== Chronology ==
·1971- Born in Nagano Prefecture.

·1987- While being a second-year high school student, he began studying under flower artist Muneyoshi Tsuchiya.

·1989- Moved to Tokyo and enrolled in the Department of Design and Crafts, specializing in flat design, at Yoyogi Seminar Art School.

·1990- Graduated from the Department of Design and Crafts at Yoyogi Seminar Art School.

·1991- Enrolled in the Flower Design Major, Department of Horticulture, Techno-Horti College of Horticulture, and studied under Sadao Kasahara. While still being a student, he established the flower studio "Fleur de Noël" and began working on publicity photos involving flowers.

·1992- Oversaw the overall production of the flower event "Bringing Flowers and Greenery to the City" for the 95th anniversary of Kumagai Yagihashi Department Store. In the same year, graduated from the Flower Design Major at Techno-Horti College, and joined the design office "Serendipity Design" in Sendagaya, Shibuya Ward, working across various fields such as commercials (CF), TV, and promotional videos (PV). Handled floral decoration for the music program "MOGURA-NEGURA" (produced by TV Tokyo and Amuse Inc.) for one year. Involved in art direction for a Kenzo Beauté commercial photo shoot.

·1993- Studied under Fumihiko Muramatsu, Interflora World Cup Champion. Joined Muramatsu Horticulture Co., Ltd. in Shizuoka City.

·1994- Returned to Nagano to take over the family flower shop and rebranded it from "Kakizaki Florist" to "Five Seasons".

·1995- Participated in the event project at Nagano's Hasedera Temple. Over the next several years, worked on stage decoration for concerts by many musical artists, including Eiichi Arai, Lee Jeong-mi, Rebun Kamuy, and Tumurbaatar Khasbaatar.

·1998- Joined the bouquet production team for the medal ceremonies of the Nagano Winter Olympics . Established Junichi Kakizaki Flower Studio.

·1999- Decorated for Butoh dancer Kazuo Ohno's performance "Kazuo Ohno at 92 Dances at Hasedera", arranging white peonies as a prelude on a stage with red felt.

·2000- Appointed a flower design instructor at Sarashina Agricultural High School in Nagano Prefecture. Decorated Kazuo Ohno's performance "Kazuo Ohno Dances at Hasedera 2000", offering 2,000 cosmos flowers to Ohno.

·2001- Incorporated Five Seasons as a company and established Five Seasons Co., Ltd.

·2002- Participated in Butoh dancer Richard Hart's performance "2 New Dance Pieces" at Guren Theater, producing stage sets. Formed the performance unit "FLORIDANCE" in collaboration with Richard Hart and held numerous performances centered in Nagano. Planned to assist flower artist Yukio Nakagawa in the exhibition "Hanamusubi" at Nagano Tokyu Department Store with artists Kazuhiko Miwa and Yoshihiko Takahashi by procuring red spider lilies. However, it was canceled due to Nakagawa's illness.

·2003- Won the national florist championship on TV Tokyo's popular program TV Champion, earning the title of "Floral King". Held his first solo exhibition 'connect' at Saihokukan Hotel Ballroom in Nagano City, which paid homage to Yukio Nakagawa. Together with Muneyoshi Tsuchiya, Sadao Kasahara, Fumihiko Muramatsu, and 300 visitors, he created the large-scale work "The Invasion of the Tulip Aliens". Collaborated with glass artist Yoshihiko Takahashi, exhibiting works including "Tsubu". For the Zenkō-ji Temple Pre-Opening Event "BUDDA ROAD MUSIC" created and exhibited the installation "Zenkō-ji Temple Dedication Flowers" in tune with music by Asian artists such as Lee Jeong-mi. Held his first overseas performance and exhibition with Richard Hart in Stockholm, Sweden: the performance titled The Color of Skin in the Absence of Sunlight? and the solo exhibition In The Absence of Sunlight. Handled spatial design for the hair salon show "ALPHA Japanesque" at Mizuno Museum of Art in Nagano, producing large works including "The Trajectory of Waves / Sea Cave" and "contrast" using bamboo and moth orchids.

·2004- For the exhibition Kitaoji Rosanjin: Turn Your Eyes to Natural Beauty (at Ouka Shorin, Nagano), arranged withered butterbur leaves and Arashishi camellias in Rosanjin’s vessels. Collaborated with photographer Nobuyoshi Araki in his exhibition Flower Life (at the North Wing of the Kitano Museum of Art in Nagano), arranging flowers in 30 glass works by Yukio Nakagawa under the theme Homage to Nobuyoshi Araki. Also at the same exhibition, performed an installation titled Hana-Matsuri: A Dedication to Arāki, scattering flowers over the head of Richard Hart, who danced to the flute of Tsuyoshi Gotō, then arranging the remains of the flowers. At the Ian Potter Centre, National Gallery of Victoria and the forecourt at Federation Square in Melbourne, Australia, he presented an installation.

·2005- Participated in the Ministry of Foreign Affairs' "Japan-EU Year of People-to-People Exchanges" with the work FRAGRANT, co-produced with the Swedish dance company SU-EN Butoh Company. He was responsible for stage art and performance. Performed in Stockholm and toured four major cities in Sweden, supported by Japan Foundation, Swedish Ministry of Culture, Swedish Institute, Swedish Arts Council, Uppsala Municipality Cultural Council, Canada Council for the Arts.

·2007- Held a solo exhibition "CRADLE - Fake? No, It's a Real" at the Sony Building in Ginza, Tokyo. Participated in the stage art and performance of the NEW LIFE - Linné Gala Event, part of Sweden's national celebration of the 300th anniversary of Carl Linnaeus. Costume was designed by Yohji Yamamoto. Supported by the Scandinavia–Japan Sasakawa Foundation, Interflora, Swedish Arts Council, Uppsala Municipality Cultural Bureau. Patronage: King Carl XVI Gustaf of Sweden. His related solo exhibition NEW LIFE - Quickening from the Cradle toured major cities including Nagano, Tokyo, New York, Washington, Prague, Moscow, Stockholm, the Netherlands, and Mexico. Delivered lectures and workshops at Uppsala University and Ekebygymnasiet Florist HV, a vocational school in Uppsala, Sweden. Participated in the "Emotion Burglar" exhibition organized by the Yuko Hasegawa Seminar (CPUE: Curatorial Practice in the Urban Environment) at Tama Art University, alongside artists such as Chu Enoki and Chim↑Pom. Designed and exhibited the works Emotion Burglar and Drowned Body.

·2008- Invited to the Dutch international outdoor theatre festival "Theaterfestival Buiten Gewoon 2008" with SU-EN. Created and exhibited the land art piece CRADLE – For The Land Art as stage design. Joined the "Sweden: Contemporary Music and Japanese Landscapes" tour. Performed with Swedish musicians Joel Grip and Niklas Barnö, and butoh dancer Richard Hart.Participated in the Asahi Art Festival 2008's program "5th Mega Togabi Art Project 2008" and co-created and exhibited NEPROJECT (PROJECT OF A ROOT) with the Togabi Kids Curators. Supported by the Asahi Beer Arts Foundation.

·2010- Presented an installation at the Vigeland Sculpture Park in Oslo, Norway, and at Ronningen Folkehøgskole. Participated in TRANCEFORMATION OF SOUND – Japan 2010, led by Swedish musician Joel Grip, presenting installations in Tokyo and Nagano. Supported by the Swedish Institute for Social Research, Umlaut Records, and the European Institute of Japanese Studies (EIJS). Established +PEALab. (Plus Environmental Art Laboratory).

·2011- Collaborated with Chim↑Pom to create the Radiated Flowers sculpture series using plants from the 30km zone around the Fukushima Daiichi Nuclear Power Plant and drifted debris from the tsunami, shortly after the disaster. Exhibited at the Chim↑Pom exhibition "REAL TIMES" at Mujin-to Production/SNAC in Tokyo and in the Osaka tour. Became a supporter of Artists' Power, an environmental project initiated by Ryuichi Sakamoto, Takeshi Kobayashi, and Kazutoshi Sakurai, aimed at promoting natural energy and environmental conservation. Participated in the "6th Mega Togabi Art Project 2011" as Junichi Kakizaki + NEPROJECT and co-created NEPROJECT #2 (PROJECT OF A ROOT #2) with Togabi alumni, supported by the Asahi Beer Arts Foundation. The work NEW LIFE – Quickening from the Cradle was archived in the library of the Tate Modern, the national gallery in the UK. Held his first solo exhibition in Paris, France: PETITS MONSTRES DES FLEURS DE PARIS (Little Flower Monsters of Paris).

·2012- Participated in SU-EN Butoh Company's 20th-anniversary retrospective exhibition VISCERAL SPACE held at the Uppsala Art Museum, Sweden (January 28–March 11). Exhibited in the NTT East Japan YOU HALL's special exhibition Flowers: Tactility – Flowers are Fascinating Now.

·2013- Participated in the skmtSocialproject, a social media experimental project by Ryuichi Sakamoto and collaborators.Exhibited Radiated Flowers in the HIROSHIMA!!!!! exhibition by Chim↑Pom, held at the former Hiroshima Branch of the Bank of Japan.

·2014- Invited by Uppsala University, he was selected as one of Japan’s seven leading contemporary floral artists for the exhibition Ikebana and Contemporary Plant Art held June 14–September 14 at the Orangery of the Linneanum Botanical Garden. Exhibited Last Moment of Flowers alongside masters from traditional ikebana schools such as Ikenobo and Hirotaka Obara of the fifth-generation Ohara School. Held an exhibition titled AMARANTH (Immortal Flower) at the opening of Alexander McQueen’s first flagship store in Japan, upon request by its creative director, Sarah Burton.

·2017- Invited as an artist to the Sapporo International Butoh Festival, where he presented the stage work TREE with Swedish dancer SU-EN. The installation TREE was exhibited at three venues across Sapporo, including the Sapporo Art Park Museum.

·2018- Performed and exhibited IKI – karma (Red Karma), the SU-EN × Junichi Kakizaki Japan Tour, in four locations across Nagano Prefecture. Participated in the Fukushima Biennale 2018 – Festival of the Sea God (October 13–28).

·2019- Held a solo exhibition Junichi Kakizaki: METAPHOR | Metaphorical Nature from May 24–June 2 at the Azumino National Government Park as a special exhibition of the 36th National Urban Greenery Fair hosted by the Ministry of Land, Infrastructure, Transport and Tourism and the Urban Green Space Foundation. Presented the modern tea ceremony Azumino Skull Tea Ceremony, in collaboration with Fumio Kinoshita, inside the tea room Azumino Skull Hermitage, which he designed. Selected as one of the most important artists in Nagano Prefecture’s postwar contemporary art history by local curators, and participated in the Shinbism 3 exhibition.

·2020- Held his second solo exhibition in Paris titled PETITS MONSTRES DES FLEURS DE PARIS II, March 13–18. Participated in the Fukushima Biennale 2020 – Festival of Wind and Moon in Shirakawa, held from September 26–November 3.

== Photo books ==
- "METAPHOR" Publisher: Twins Lion Do, Author: Junichi Kakizaki, Photo: Junichi Kakizaki / Joji Okamoto, (21/06/2019), ISBN 978-4990928384 / ISBN 4990928385, (English / Japanese, Bilingual)
- "NEW LIFE - Quickening from the Cradle" = Atarashii seimei: Yurikago karano taidō = New Life: Yurikago karano taidō, Publisher: Kyuryudo art publishing, Author: Junichi Kakizaki, Photo: Junichi Kakizaki / Joji Okamoto, (2007/09/26), ISBN 9784763007285 / ISBN 978-4763007285, (Japanese / English, bilingual)

== See also ==
- List of Japanese artists
