= Chiara Passa =

Italian artist

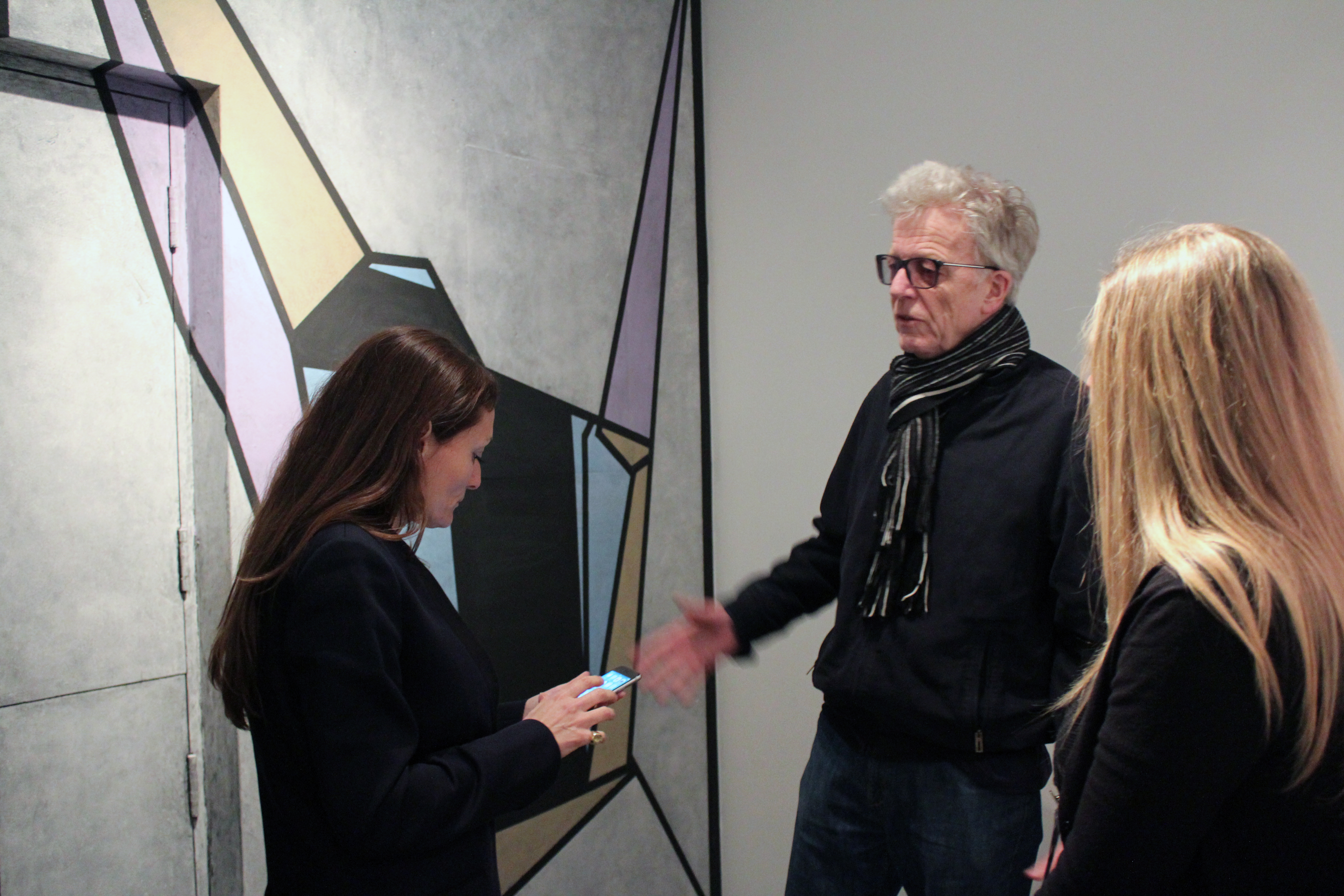
- Chiara Passa at her solo exhibition at Furtherfield gallery, London
- Born: 1973 (age 52–53); Rome
- Education: MFA Fine Art Academy. Master in new audio-visual mediums at the Faculty of Modern Literature
- Known for: New media art, net art, Interactive video installation
- Notable work: Live Architectures series, Live sculpture, Dimensioning, Google Earth Extemporary Land Art, Ideasonair.net, The Widget Art Gallery
- Movement: Digital art
- Awards: she received diverse awards and recognitions including: ATA Grant for media art 2015;

Chiara Passa (born 1973) is a visual artist working in media art since the second half of the 1990s.

Her artistic research analyses differences in virtual spaces through a variety of techniques - often using augmented reality and virtual reality technologies. She works with animation and interactive video-installation, digital art in public space as site-specific artworks and Projection mapping, video sculpture, art-applications and Widget (GUI) for mobile platforms.

== Main artworks ==
In 1996, Passa began her work in animation and video-installation, which has been described as a constant study of the figure, geometric and essential, combined with a three-dimensional and dynamic vision of the virtual space. In 1999, Passa coined the term "Super Place" as a reference for "Extens(z)ion Projects" and later for "Live Architectures" - a series of digital artworks developed over time and based on the concept of "super place" where the site is self-performing and moves beyond its capabilities, reflecting on the idea of the virtual/unreal and how human bodies, in real space, are related to this kind of dimension/experience.

Passa's artistic research mainly explores architecture as interface, for example in the virtual reality series "Dimensioning" that aims to create a multi-dimensional extension of the space, allowing visitors to navigate into a moving 360¬∞ area. The net-art series "Extemporary Land Art on Google Earth" aims to create an extemporary-temporary virtual land-art through augmented reality technology, constructing and re-constructing a sort of "mise en abyme" or "droste effect" in which an element shifts the other in depth. The Google earth environment merges with the augmented area in order to create a new space. "Live sculpture" is an interactive software-artwork where the body of the viewer is fully involved and becoming a three-dimensional marble sculpture constituted by variable virtual meshes. In 2005 Passa created the blog-art project "ideasonair.net-blogging as an open art project" (2005-2012 online archive). This was a conceptual net-artwork in progress that put into practice the concept of "open artwork", creating and sharing many artistic ideas in various fields between artists, curators, critics and art lovers.

In 2009 (ongoing) Passa created and developed "The Widget Art Gallery", a web-app as virtual gallery, which every two months hosts a solo digital art exhibition (supporting digital artists) related to and inspired by its dynamic site-specific context. The "Widget Art Gallery" works both as a gallery showing temporary exhibitions and as a permanent collection museum, conserving all the past exhibitions inside an online archive.
