= Matthew Battles =

Associate director of metaLAB

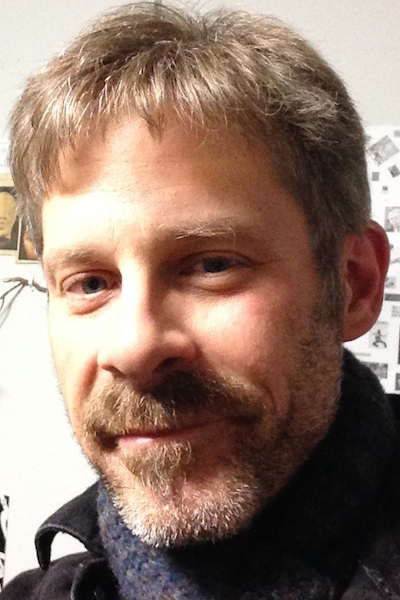

Matthew Battles (born 1968) is a writer, artist, and since 2022 the editor of Harvard’s Arnold Arboretum magazine, Arnoldia. Until 2022 he was the associate director of metaLAB at Harvard University. Battles is the author or co-author of six books, most of which are on the topics of writing or libraries. He was named a Library Journal Mover and Shaker in 2004. He has been called "a gifted stylist" by the Christian Science Monitor which commended his "beautiful writing about writing."

Battles also sees the institution of the library as more than just the building's contents. He headed a team which created a data visualization of the printing locations of books published in early-modern Europe, shown over time. He also worked with artist Sarah Newman on the video installation Your Story Has Touched My Heart which drew heavily on Harvard's photo archives. His "feral copyright project" at metaLAB looked into how copyright is lived and understood by regular people.

== Personal life ==
Battles was raised in raised in Petersburg, Illinois. He received a B.A. in anthropology from the University of Chicago in 1992, and an M.A. in creative writing from Boston University in 1996. He is married and has one son and one daughter.

== Bibliography ==
- Library: An Unquiet History (Norton, 2003) ISBN 9780393351453
- Widener: Biography of a Library (Widener Library, 2004) ISBN 9780674016682
- The Sovereignties of Invention (Red Lemonade, 2012) ISBN 9781935869122
- The Library Beyond the Book (with Jeffrey Schnapp, 2014) ISBN 9780674725034
- Palimpsest: A History of the Written Word (Norton, 2015) ISBN 9780393058857
- (Object Lessons) Tree (Bloomsbury, 2017) ISBN 9781628920512
