= Daan Samson =

Dutch artist (born 1973)

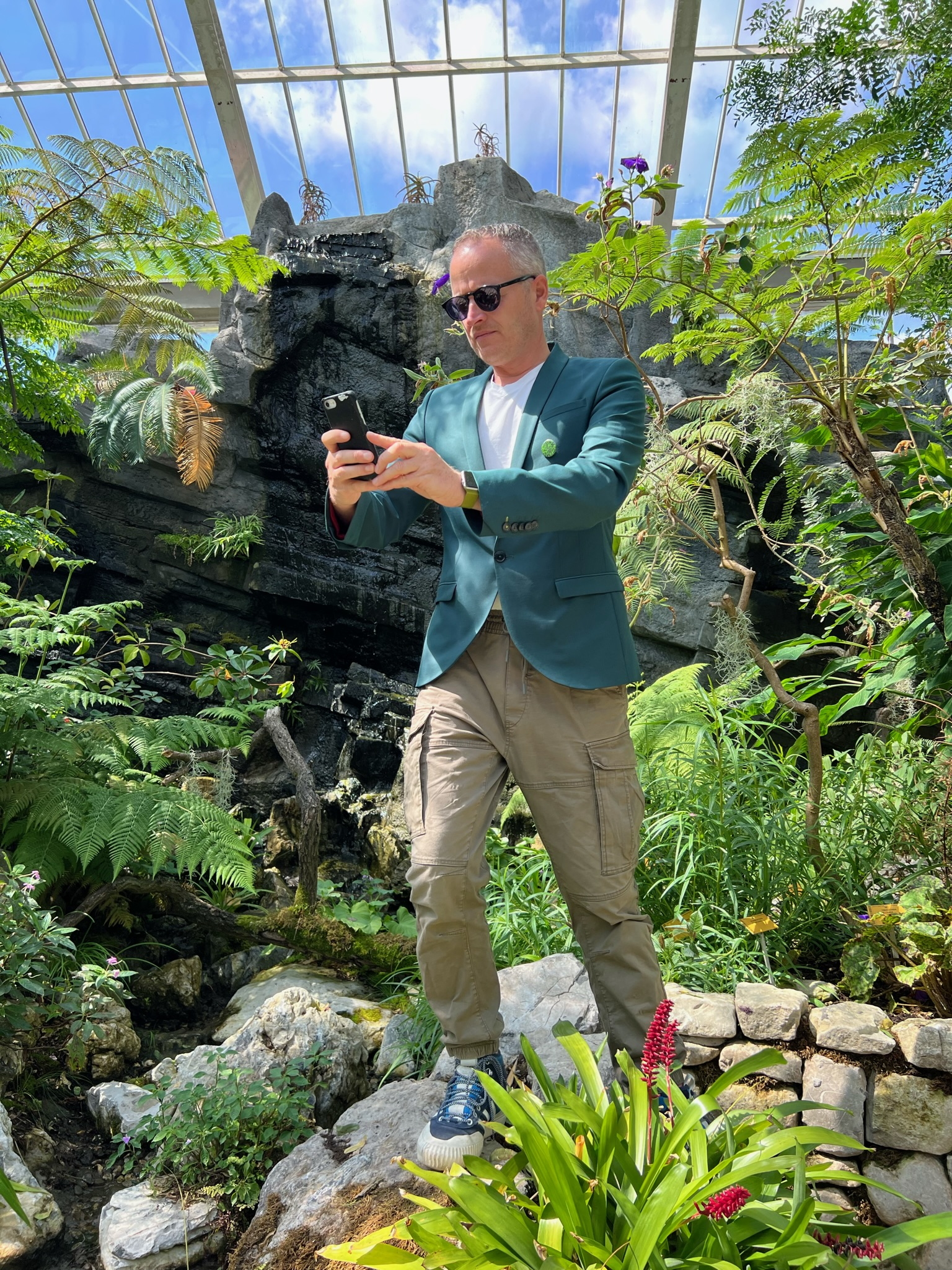
- Daan Samson in 2023 (at work in Meise Botanic Garden)

Daan Samson (born 1973) is a Dutch artist. His work deals with taboos, embarrassments and achievements of the welfare state.

== Biografie ==
Samson lives and works in Rotterdam and was educated at the Willem de Kooning Academy.

== Overview ==
Alongside Dutch artists Tinkebell and Jonas Staal, he is regarded as a leading exponent of a new generation of media artists. By adopting distinct positions within the media landscape, his work engages directly with pressing social issues. In Samson’s case, the artist distributes works that call for the rejection of the concept of sinfulness. According to some critics he takes a cynical stance, bearing resemblance to a right‑wing liberal argument.

Samson calls himself a ‘prosperity artist’ and argues for a re-evaluation of material objects. His approach translates into the production of performances, installations and photographs.

== Works ==
=== Prosperity biotopes ===
Since 2020, Samson has been working on a series of artworks under the title Welfare Biotopes. In display cases and art installations, he imitates pieces of 'original nature' and places prosperity items in them. On the cultural blog Trendbeheer, Samson says: "It seems that we all long for a life in untouched nature, while our worldwide growing prosperity is mainly driven by consumption, innovation and globalization. My prosperity biotopes illustrate this balancing act"

In 2021, Samson created a ‘prosperity biotope’ in the garden of Museum Boijmans Van Beuningen based on nature in Central America. Among living plants were consumer items such as designer chairs and cosmetic devices; some of which have a permanent place in the museum’s design collection.

In certain 'welfare biotopes' Samson lets ant colonies live. Samson received advice on the myrmecotrophy between ant and plant species from former horticulturalist Art Vogel.

=== The Liberal Herbarium ===
Just before the Dutch general elections of 2012, Samson created an art work together with the neoliberal politician Halbe Zijlstra (VVD), who was State Secretary of Education, Culture and Science at the time. They made a herbarium. Using the world of wild flora as a metaphor, the two men advocated an art climate in which artists would not make themselves dependent upon resources that could be influenced by politics. A photographic documentation of this collaboration was published one day before the elections in the national newspaper NRC Handelsblad. Leading art magazine Metropolis M described the work as ‘a slightly nauseating image’.

=== Procession of value and harvest ===
In February 2012, Samson was asked to perform the opening ceremony of the art centre NP3.tmp in Groningen. He did so by organising a procession through the city. In a Procession of value and harvest volunteers carried a selection of sponsored luxury items through the town centre. All of these articles, ranging from fitness machines to outdoor kitchens, were sacrifices from the business world. When the procession was over, all the items became personal possessions of the artist.

=== Art Babes ===
In 2011, the art series Art Babes was launched during the international art fair Art Rotterdam. This was a collaboration with photographer Jeronimus van Pelt, showing photographs of female art professionals posing as sex objects. The women included art theorists, artists, curators and a museum director. The idea was to investigate whether society would allow female intellectuals to present themselves as having a sexual identity. The project stirred a lot of debate and received much media interest. The editor of Kunstbeeld magazine chose Art Babes as ‘the least appreciable art work of the international art fair’.

=== Tabloid with Frits Bolkestein ===
In 2011, Samson produced a tabloid in collaboration with Frits Bolkestein, a retired prominent liberal politician. The paper presented the documentation of a ‘pamper day’ to which Bolkestein was treated by the artist in Rotterdam’s museum district. The tabloid was published recently after Frits Bolkestein – at a demonstration against budget cuts for culture – had pleaded for more government spending on art and culture; albeit by cutting back on development aid. In 2011, the Wiarda Beckman Foundation – the scientific bureau of the Dutch labour party – invited Samson to publish works of art in their monthly magazine Socialism & Democracy. In the end, the editors of the magazine refused to publish his selection. In their view, the images of Art Babes and Frits Bolkestein were too right-wing. The rejection made the national news.

=== Showing one's colours ===
In 2008, Samson asked hundreds of schoolboys and schoolgirls to compose letters in which he would cancel his membership of the PVDA (the Dutch labour party). The pupils were asked to give a motivation why the artist no longer wished to be a party member. All these letters, signed by Samson, were sent to the party headquarters. This educational project, entitled "Showing one's colours", was part of the educational programme of exhibition space TENT in Rotterdam.

== Trivia ==
In 2011, Samson was asked by the Wiardi Beckman Foundation to publish a number of works of art in the monthly magazine 'Socialism & Democracy'. The editors of the magazine ultimately refused to publish the selection. In the eyes of the scientific bureau of the PVDA, the images were considered to have a right-wing character.
