= Jeffrey Schnapp =

American humanist and technologist (born 1954)

- Born: Jeffrey Thompson Schnapp; 1954 (age 71–72); New York, USA
- Occupations: Professor, Historian, Designer, Technologist

Academic work
- Discipline: Comparative Literature, Italian Studies, Cultural History
- Institutions: Harvard University; Stanford University
- Website: jeffreyschnapp.com

Jeffrey Schnapp (born 1954) is an American university professor who works as a cultural historian, designer, and technologist. Until joining the Harvard University in 2011, he was the director of the Stanford Humanities Lab from its foundation in 1999 through 2009. At Harvard, he holds the Carl Pescosolido Chair in Romance and Comparative Literatures in the Faculty of Arts and Sciences and also teaches in the Department of Architecture at Harvard's Graduate School of Design. Effective June 2015, he assumed the position of chief executive officer and co-founder of Piaggio Fast Forward, the robotics division of the Piaggio. In 2018 he transitioned to the role of Chief Visionary Officer, handing over the role of CEO to his co-founder Greg Lynn.

== Biography ==
Until joining the Harvard University faculty in 2011, Jeffrey Schnapp served as director of the Stanford Humanities Lab from its foundation in 1999 through 2009. At Stanford University he occupied the Pierotti Chair in Italian Literature and was professor of French & Italian, and Comparative Literature, with an additional affiliation to German Studies. Though primarily based in the field of Italian studies, he has played a pioneering role in several areas of transdisciplinary research and led the development of a new wave of digital humanities work. His research interests extend from antiquity to the present, encompassing the material history of literature, the history of 20th-century architecture and design, and the cultural history of science and engineering. Trained as a Romance philologist, Schnapp is the author or editor of some thirty books and an extensive corpus of essays on authors such as Virgil, Ovid, Dante, Hildegard of Bingen, Petrarch, Machiavelli, Gabriele d'Annunzio, and Filippo Tommaso Marinetti, and on topics such as late antique patchwork poetry, futurist and dadaist visual poetics, the cultural history of coffee consumption, glass architecture, the iconography of the pipe in modern art, and the electronic book. His book Crowds was the recipient of the Modernist Studies Association prize for best book of 2006. More recently, Storia rapida della velocità (Milan: Il Saggiatore) received the 2025 Premio di saggistica “Città delle rose”.

At Harvard, he occupies the Carl Pescosolido Professor of Romance and Comparative Literatures in the Faculty of Arts and Sciences, is the current chair of the Department of Comparative Literature and is also affiliated with the Department of Architecture at the Graduate School of Design. In addition to serving as the founder/faculty director of metaLAB (at) Harvard, he serves as faculty co-director of the Berkman Klein Center for Internet and Society where metaLAB is housed.

He is also a guest curator who has collaborated with several leading museums: among them, the Canadian Centre for Architecture, the Cantor Arts Center, the Wolfsonian-FIU, the Triennale di Milano, Fondazione Cirulli (Bologna), and the Centro Internazionale di Studi di Architettura Andrea Palladio (Vicenza). His Trento Tunnels project – a 6000 sq. meter pair of superhighway tunnels at the entrance to the Northern Italian city of Trent, repurposed as an experimental history museum, has undergone several editions since 2008: among them, "I Trentini e la Grande Guerra (Il popolo scomparso/la sua storia ritrovata)" (2008–2009), "Storicamente ABC" (2010–2011), and "Ski Past" (2012). "Panorama of the Cold War," carried out with Elisabetta Terragni (Studio Terragni Architetti) and Daniele Ledda (XY comm), was exhibited in the Albanian Pavilion of the 2012 Venice Biennale of Architecture and in Erasmus Effect – Architetti italiani all’estero / Italian Architects Abroad at the MAXXI (Dec. 2013-April 2014). He was also on the team that developed BZ ’18-’45, a documentation center built under Marcello Piacentini's Bolzano Victory Monument open to the public since July 2014.

== metaLAB (at) Harvard ==
In February 2011, Schnapp founded a laboratory at Harvard under the aegis of the Berkman Center for Internet and Society: metaLAB (at) Harvard, with his initial collaborators James Burns, Daniele Ledda, Kara Oehler, Gerard R. Pietrushko, and Jesse Shapins. The current metaLAB Principals group includes: Sarah Newman, Moira Weigel, Dario Rodighiero, and Kim Albrecht. The metaLAB community shifts from year to year; the current membership is documented at https://mlml.io/members/.

metaLAB is "a global knowledge-design lab engaged in critical and creative practice across the disciplinary grid. Rooted in the arts and humanities, its research unfolds at the crossroads between code and narrative, data and ethics, networks and archives." metaLAB operates as a kind of "do tank" broadly engaged with the modeling of new and experimental forms of networked culture and knowledge.

At the end of 2021, metaLAB opened a new platform in Berlin, Germany, in collaboration with Kim Albrecht and Annette Jael Lehmann at the Institut für Theaterwissenschaft at the Freie Universität Berlin: metaLAB (at) Berlin. A third metaLAB was established in Basel, Switzerland in 2024, hosted by the Academy of Art and Design, University of Applied Sciences and Arts.

=== The Library Beyond the Book ===
Schnapp's The Library Beyond the Book of 2013 (published in 2014), written with Matthew Battles, surveys elements of libraries potentially relevant to today's transitional digital era. It examines past mainstays such as buildings, shelves, catalogs, access cards, reference desks, carrel desks, and librarians, and wonders how each might find new purpose in the near future. It discusses the importance of databases, digital preservation, mobile libraries, serendipity, cloistering, and meatspaces, and mentions initiatives such as Rio de Janeiro's Manguinhos Library Park, the pop-up Occupy Wall Street Library, Chattanooga Public Library's makerspace, the Digital Public Library of America, and London's Idea Store. In the words of one reviewer, the authors "imagine six plausible scenarios for serving tomorrow's diverse information consumers, situating libraries as everything from study shelters to civic institutions functioning as mobile libraries, reading rooms promoting social change, and/or event-driven knowledge centers." It is the first in a series of Metalab publications "that will investigate the role of print-based scholarship in the digital age."

=== Cold Storage ===
Among metaLAB's experiments is "Cold Storage": an experimental web documentary (or so-called database documentary) made up of over 500 media objects developed in 2013–2015 as an "animated archive" and extension of the volume "The Library Beyond the Book," published in 2014 in the metaLABprojects series by Harvard University Press. The work was directed by Cristoforo Magliozzi and produced by Schnapp.

=== futureSTAGE ===
Coordinated with Paolo Petrocelli, the Head of Dubai Opera in the United Arab Emirates and involving some thirty leading professionals from every walk of the performing arts world, the futureSTAGE project was developed during the years of the COVID-19 pandemic in order to forster innovation in the form of a post-pandemic turn to a "new normal" and to prompt creative and critical reflection on the future of the performing arts, performing arts venues, organizational structures, and policies. It has initially assumed the form of the Future Stage Manifesto.

=== Storia rapida della velocità ===
Awarded the 2025 Premio di saggistica “Città delle rose” (an honor whose prior recipients include Alberto Manguel, Marc Augé, Michail Chodorkovskji, Edgar Morin, and Tzvetan Todorov), the book, available only in Italian, proposes a deep and panoramic history of the human fascination with speed: an "anthropology of speed” that travels across epochs as well as imaginings, technologies, narratives, and neuroscience. For the moment, the book exists only in Italian, but editions in other languages, including English, are sure to follow. The dust jacket cover reads: "In A Fast-Paced History of Speed, Jeffrey Schnapp spans millennia, cultures, and technologies to explore the profound relationship between velocity and civilization. This is not merely a history of technology or transportation, but a fascinating journey into the imagination and sensibilities of modern humanity—-forever poised between the desire for transcendence and the limitations of the body. From the Spartan Ladas, who ran so fast he seemed to float through the air, to the cosmic wheels that envelop Dante in the Paradiso; from Thomas De Quincey’s mail coach to the Futurist race cars of Filippo Tommaso Marinetti; from J.M.W. Turner fiery portraits of locomotives to Nvidia’s latest superchip— every form of acceleration tells a story of metamorphosis. And every transformation carries a promise to surpass the human but also the risk of losing oneself in a world that moves too fast. With intelligence and irony, Schnapp reconstructs an anthropology of speed made of bodies, machines, ecstasies, and crashes. A book that urges us to reflect on what we are becoming. Because in our race toward the future, speed is not just a means—-it is the very measure of what we call progress, power, and existence."

== Principal books ==
- The Transfiguration of History at the Center of Dante's Paradise. Princeton & Guildford: Princeton U P, 1986.
- L'Espositione di Bernardino Daniello da Lucca sopra la Commedia di Dante. Ed. with Robert Hollander; in collaboration with Kevin Brownlee and Nancy J. Vickers. Hanover & London: U P of New England, 1989.
- The Poetry of Allusion: Virgil and Ovid in Dante's Commedia. Ed. with Rachel Jacoff. Stanford: Stanford U P, 1991.
- Staging Fascism: 18 BL and The Theater of Masses for Masses. Stanford: Stanford UP, 1996. Expanded edition (in Italian translation), 18 BL. Mussolini e l'opera d'arte di massa. Milan: Garzanti Editore, 1996.
- A Primer of Italian Fascism. Edition with commentary and introduction. Trans. by Jeffrey T. Schnapp, Olivia E. Sears, and Maria Stampino. European Horizons series. Lincoln: University of Nebraska Press, 2000.
- Gaetano Ciocca. Costruttore, inventore, scrittore. Introduction by Giorgio Ciucci. With brief contributions by Massimo Martignoni and Paola Pettenella. Quaderni di Architettura 3. Museo di Arte Moderna, Trento-Rovereto. Milan: Skira, 2000.
- Vedette fiumane. L'occupazione vista e vissuta da Madeleine Witherspoon Dent Gori-Montanelli, crocerossina americana, e da Francesco Gori-Montanelli, Capo del Genio e del reparto fotografico. Ed. with introduction, notes, and iconographic apparatus. Trans. Valentina Ricci. Venice: Marsilio Editore, 2000.
- Hugo Ball/Jonathan Hammer, Ball and Hammer (Tenderenda the Fantast). Edited and introduced by Jeffrey T. Schnapp. New Haven: Yale U P, 2002.
- Anno X. La Mostra della Rivoluzione fascista del 1932: genesi - sviluppo - contesto culturale-storico - ricezione. With an afterword by Claudio Fogu. Piste - Piccola biblioteca di storia 4. Rome-Pisa: Istituti Editoriali e Poligrafici Internazionali, 2003.
- Building Fascism, Communism, Democracy: Gaetano Ciocca—Builder, Inventor, Farmer, Writer, Engineer. Stanford: Stanford U P, 2003.
- In cima—Giuseppe Terragni per Margherita Sarfatti (Nuove architetture della memoria), catalogue for exhibition of same name, curated and edited by Jeffrey T. Schnapp, Centro Internazionale Andrea Palladio, Vicenza, June 26, 2004 – January 1, 2005. Venice: Marsilio Editore, June 2004.
- Filippo Tommaso Marinetti, Teatro, edited by Jeffrey T. Schnapp, 2 vols., Oscar Mondadori, (Milan: Mondadori 2004).
- Revolutionary Tides, catalogue for exhibition of same name, curated and edited by Jeffrey T. Schnapp, Cantor Arts Center / The Wolfsonian-FIU, Hoover Institution, (Milan: Skira and Cantor Arts Center, 2005). Italian, French, and English editions.
- Crowds, ed. by Jeffrey T. Schnapp and Matthew Tiews, (Stanford: Stanford University Press, 2006).
- Neoantiqua - Nove ensaios sobre literatura, linguagem e pensamento na Idade Média e no Renascimiento. Introduction by Luiz Costa-Lima. Trans. Erick Felinto de Oliveira, Alessandra Vannucci, and Maria Lucia Daflon. (Collection of essays, some previously published, translated into Portuguese). Rio de Janeiro: Eduerj (Editora da Universidade do Estado de Rio de Janeiro), 2008.
- Italiamerica I, ed. and introduced by Emanuela Scarpellini and Jeffrey T. Schnapp, vol. 1, Fondazione Mondadori, Milan: Il Saggiatore, 2008.
- SPEED limits, ed. by Jeffrey T. Schnapp, Wolfsonian-FIU and the Canadian Centre for Architecture, Milan: Skira, 2009.
- The Electric Information Age Book: McLuhan / Agel / Fiore and the Experimental Paperback, with Adam Michaels, introduction by Steven Heller, afterword by Andrew Blauvelt, New York: Princeton Architectural Press, 2012.
- Italiamerica II, ed. and introduced by Emanuela Scarpellini and Jeffrey T. Schnapp, vol. 2, Fondazione Mondadori, Milan: Il Saggiatore, 2012.
- Modernitalia, ed. by Francesca Santovetti, Italian Modernities 13, New York: Peter Lang, 2012.
- Digital_Humanities, with Anne Burdick, Johanna Drucker, Peter Lunenfeld, and Todd Presner, Cambridge: MIT Press, 2012. Open edition available at https://web.archive.org/web/20131023012128/http://mitpress.mit.edu/sites/default/files/titles/content/9780262018470_Open_Access_Edition.pdf.
- Jeffrey T. Schnapp; Matthew Battles (2014). The Library Beyond the Book. Harvard University Press. ISBN 978-0-674-72503-4.
- Knowledge Design, Herrenhausen Lectures pamphlet series, Volkswagen Foundation, Hannover, Germany, (2014).
- Blueprint for Counter Education – Expanded Reprint, a new edition of Maurice Stein and Larry Miller's 1970 work, edited by Jeffrey Schnapp and designed by Adam Michaels – Project Projects, (New York: Inventory Books, 2016).
- FuturPiaggio. Six Italian Lessons on Mobility and Modern Life, English edition, (Milan/New York: Rizzoli, 2017).
- Moto Guzzi 100 Years, English edition, (Milan/New York, Rizzoli International, 2021).
- Bruno Munari, Fantasy – Invention, Creativity, and Imagination in Visual Communication, translated and with a preface and critical apparatus by Jeffrey Schnapp, (Los Angeles: Inventory Books, 2024)
- Storia rapida della velocità, (Milan: Il Saggiatore, May 2025)
- Bruno Munari, Design and Visual Communication, translated and with a preface and critical apparatus by Jeffrey Schnapp, (Los Angeles: Inventory Books, 2025).
