= Intima Virtual Base =

Contemporary arts institute

Intima Virtual Base is an institute for contemporary arts founded by the director and artist Igor Štromajer. It is an institution dealing with media, contemporary performing arts, radio and sound projects, performance and theory, body-related theory, music, dance, choreography, and computer graphics. In 2001 Igor Štromajer and Brane Zorman embarked on projects that they named Ballettikka Internetikka.

== Ballettikka Internettikka ==
Ballettika Internetikka is a series of projects which began in 2001 during the time when the internet was only a small part of peoples lives. It explores wireless internet ballet performances combined with tactics from the guerrilla performances and mobile live internet broadcasting strategies. The projects began in 2002 and they are still happening around the world from Germany, Norway and Italy, to Russia, Antarctica, Hong Kong and Japan.

=== Ballettikka Internettikka – Part One: Net.Ballet (2001) ===
The event was exploring how ballet can be performed with a series of still images via live Webcam video capture and an automatic change of the images every 20 seconds on the Net. The choreography was based on the HTML and JavaScript codes enhanced with sound/music. It explored the movements of a dancer’s body and how a ballet story can be told, shown and danced with a series of still images. Anything that the dancer was doing between those 20 seconds was not shown to the viewers.

=== Ballettikka Internettikka – Part Two: Ballet.Net (2002) ===
The second phase of the project took place in the building of the Bolshoi Ballet in Moscow, Russia, exactly one year after Part One – net.ballet. Requests to perform Ballettika Internettika on stage were sent to the Bolshoi Ballet company. There was no reply so on 28 March 2002 Igor Štromajer and Brane Zorman entered the Bolshoi Theatre from the main entrance with a rack sack on their backs and valid tickets for that night’s performance. They were asked to leave their sacks before entering, but that was impossible since all the equipment that where needed for the live web show was in there.

Plan B was now their only way to perform live, they entered from a small window in the left wing of the building and they performed the ballet.net in an abandoned part of the cellar. The illegal action was classed as an invasion; everything was planned, watches were synchronized, hi-tech mobile and wireless equipment for the broadcast were used along with portable computers, mp3 audio systems and mini digital cameras. Štromajer says: "It's the top place for dancing and we wanted to demystify it. I wanted to dance there as a non-dancer and was dancing there in the name of all the ballet dancers world-wide: all of them who cannot dance in the Bolshoi, but would like to, because the Bolshoi is an international symbol for classical ballet."

Štromajer says: ‘‘The new general director of the Bolshoi theatre, Anatoliy Iksanov, told the press in Moscow that he would like to include new dynamics into his theatre. Well, Ballettikka would certainly be an opportunity for him.’’

=== Ballettikka Interettikka: M-III Robot Net Ballet (2003) ===
After establishing the fact that they can dance and broadcast themselves on the Net, Igor Štromajer and Brane Zorman decided to replace their human bodies with robots. The next project took place in the International Theatre of Bergen in Norway. The project came to life with help and collaboration from the choreographer Hooman Sharifi.

Video of performance

=== Ballettikka RealVideo Internettika (2003) ===
The project was premiered in Moderna galerija Ljubljana – Slovene Museum of Contemporary arts & Television Slovenia Kultura – Lijubjana, Slovenia in December 2003. Štromajer and Zorman brought together two Moscow acts; one was the Internet Ballet and their illegal invasion of Moscow’s Bolshoi Theatre and the second one was the Chechen terrorist act in the Dubrovka Theatre in October 2002.

The condensed version of Ballettikka RealVideo Internettikka consists of a video with Morse-code dramaturgy. After the terrorist attack, Štromajer realised that his invasion in the Bolshoi theatre could have easily ended up being a terrorist attack instead of an artistic piece. The two acts were sharing common methods and actions; the homicidal – suicidal terrorist act represents the ritual materialization of the intimate sacrifice of one’s own body, as well as of those of others, while ballet represents a strategic sacrifice of the dancer’s body as it is honed into a perfectly functioning machine. Brian Jenkins says: ‘‘Terrorism is theatre’’ but in the end all the artistic standards are left on the side and the only thing that is left is tactics, both in art and terrorism. Ballettikka RealVideo Internettikka makes an input to the misunderstanding of contemporary postmodern terrorism and democracy’s fear of extremist dedication; it symbolizes a fascination with criticism of the system and with appeals to the beauty of dying. The Chechen terrorist Barayev said: ‘‘We have come here to die!’’ as him and his group disrupted the Moscow performance of the musical Nord-Ost. "We have come here to dance," wrote Štromajer, as an Internet link was launched with the Bolshoi Theatre. The wireless ballet began, seven months before Barayev died.

Video of Performance

=== Ballettikka Internettikka – Auto Mobillikka (2004) ===
The project was located on the Ljubljana Beltway - Motorway Ring in south Slovenia. On 4 October 2004 Stromajer and Zorman were manipulating two remote-controlled toy-ballet robots with wireless cameras and broadcasting live video and audio signal GPRS/GSM mobile phones on the internet. Everything was set up on a car, laptops, speakers and mobile phones. Two video cameras were attached to the remote controlled cars and they were broadcasting the movements of the ballet robot. The project in Ljubljana Beltway opened the doors for the following project in Italy. Video of Performance

=== Balletikka Internettikka – Illigalikka Robottikka (2004) ===
On 13 November 2004 Igor Štromajer and Brane Zorman were ready to act out the next project. Based on the previous project Ballettikka Internettikka – Auto Mobillikka they took it a step further where this time they made the robots perform in the kitchen of the famous Teatro Alla Scala were bio-food for artists is prepared. The two artists once again they used the two remote controlled cars with the two web cameras and they broadcast the toy robot while he was ballet dancing in the Kitchen. The toy robot was transformed into a guerrilla-ballet dancer. Hi-tech mobile and wireless equipment were used for the invasion and the broadcasting once again.

Dancing an illegal wireless roboballet in the kitchen of the Teatro alla Scala was a challenge to the Intima Virtual Base, as a result the preparations have been taken seriously, safety procedures have been taken, and the previous experience from the Bolshoi Theatre in Moscow has been a great help.

In November 2004, Teatro alla Scala was temporarily closed for the public due to renovation works; therefore all the performances took place at the Teatro degli Arcimboldi. So the project was not affected by any means from the theatre management. Video of Performance

=== Ballettikka Internettikka - VolksNetBallet (People's Internet Ballet) (2006) ===
People's Internet Ballet was performed on Sunday, 9 July 2006 at 9 PM GMT+1 (Berlin/Paris local time) at, and secretly broadcast (as six one-minute live streaming videos) from the Basement Toilet in Volksbühne at Rosa-Luxemburg Square in Berlin, Germany. Here is a description of the performance:

"Stromajer and Zorman manipulated a semi-automatic flying cow and eleven robots dancing an internet ballet, MC Brane conducted an MP3 orchestra!"

VolksNetBallet was broadcast in the form of six one-minute streaming videos, almost live, with only two minutes delay. It means that the visitors could see and hear in six steps what had just happened only two minutes earlier during the VolksNetBallet in Volksbühne Basement Toilet. All six videos were edited live in-camera, using only STOP and REC functions, then immediately converted to Real Media files using Real Producer, and finally, transferred to the server for viewing.

The artists utilized low-tech mobile and wireless equipment for the invasion and live broadcast: a public unprotected wireless internet connection point (wLAN), available for free at the Rosa-Luxemburg Square in Berlin (ID: Helmut22; signal strength in the basement of Volksbühne: 2/5), free RealProducer (version 11.0) and Live LE software for streaming video and audio live manipulation. Ballettikka Internettikka: VolksNetBallet took place on the very same evening and at the very same time as another huge people's festivity—the final match of the World Soccer Cup 2006, which also took place in Germany.

Dancing a wireless people's internet ballet in Volksbühne Berlin represented a challenge to the Intima Virtual Base and all the collaborators, therefore, the preparations were taken seriously, safety measures were calculated, and the previous experiences from the Bolshoi Theatre in Moscow, La Scala in Milan and The National Theatre in Belgrade were used.

The project was supported by The Ministry of Culture of the Republic of Slovenia. Video of Performance

=== Ballettikka Internettikka: RenminNetBallet (2007) ===
RenminNetBallet is an re-enactment/remake/reinterpretation of the VolksNetBallet guerrilla net ballet action (Berlin 2006) and was performed as a part of the Microwave Festival - Media x Activism Poster Conference in Hong Kong on Saturday 17 November 2007 at 4PM Hong Kong Standard Time (GMT+8). It took place in the Hong Kong City Hall toilet for disabled persons and presented in the Innocentre, Hong Kong. The artists used a Mac Book Pro laptop computer and low-technology mobile and wireless equipment: Mini DV cam, MP3 players, remote controlled toy-robot etc. Video of Performance

=== Ballettikka Internettikka: Stattikka (2007) ===
Stromajer and Zorman furtively performed a new internet ballet—Ballettikka Internettikka: Stattikka—as a part of the Tele-Plateau - Performative Installation in Hellerau, Dresden, broadcasting live from the roof of the targeted skyscraper in Hong Kong (Lippo Centre 2), in front of the dense cityscape, using a commercial Silverlit R/C Robot Program-a-BOT, dancing an Almost Static But Still Transitive Net Ballet for 30 minutes in the Hong Kong dawn. This happened on Saturday 17 November 2007 at 10 PM Central European Time (GMT+1) and lasted for 30 mins. Video of Performance

=== Ballettikka Internettikka: Olymppikka (2008) ===
It took place on Monday 24 March 2008. At the same time that the official 2008 Olympic Torch was being kindled by the light of the Sun (Olympia, Greece), Stromajer & Zorman digitally ignited a robot with computer software. Video of Performance

=== Ballettikka Internettikka: Hydraullikka (2008) ===
Hydraullikka took place at Plaza del Rey, Madrid, on 10 May 2008. It consisted of two robots being placed in a hydraulic press machine where they were crushed, pressed, and ground together to symbolise love and togetherness. Video of Performance

=== Ballettikka Internettikka: Intermenttikka (2008) ===
Intermenttikka was performed as part of the Digital Playground 2008, secretly broadcasting live from the target construction site in Seoul, performing a robotic ballet after sunrise. It consisted of a Live Internet Broadcast from Seoul, Korea on Tuesday 22 July 2008 at 6 AM Korean Time (GMT/UTC+9). The artists covered the commercial Silverlit R/C toy-robot with cement and placed it into reinforced ferroconcrete foundations of the target construction site (the rising Dongdaemun (Great East Gate) / Tongdaemun Market), to stay there forever.

The interred robot was equipped with a QSTARZ BT-Q818 extreme GPS transmitter which was broadcasting the signal until the transmitter run out of batteries. The signal was edited live by the computer software.

From 22 July to 24 August the Ballettikka Internettikka Intermenttikka project (including the selected history of Ballettikka Internettikka since 2001) was exhibited in TMCA (Total Museum of Contemporary Art) in Seoul, as a part of the Digital Playground 2008 - "Hack the City!" exhibition curated by Nathalie Boseul Shin.

Video of Performance

=== Ballettikka Internettikka: Norddikka (2008) ===
Norddikka was a live Internet Broadcast from Svalbard, Arctic Ocean on Wednesday 31 December 2008 at 23:55 PM Central European Time (GMT/UTC+1). 0Svalbard is a cluster of islands) in the Arctic Ocean north of mainland Europe, about midway between mainland Norway and the North Pole, and forms the northernmost part of Norway and the northernmost lands of Europe.

The largest island is Spitsbergen (37,673 km2 or 14,550 square miles), and the largest settlement is Longyearbyen (approximately 2,075 inhabitants, the administrative centre of Svalbard, located on Spitsbergen). Svalbard lies far north of the Arctic Circle. In Longyearbyen, the polar night lasts from 26 October to 15 February. From 12 November to the end of January there is civil polar night, a continuous period without any twilight bright enough to permit outdoor activities in the absence of artificial light.

Stromajer and Zorman conducted and monitored the leaving of the robot in the deep snow of the white spaciousness of the Arctic glacier (Olav V Land, Svalbard) on New Year's Eve. They were located in their Control Centre in Ljubljana (CCL), Slovenia.

Receiving instructions from CCL, two executants, Nils Are Mohn and Åsmund Njøs, keepers of the Indian research base on Svalbard (NCAOR - Indian National Research Centre; opened in July 2008 in collaboration with the Norwegian Polar Institute, as one of the twelve international permanent research bases in Svalbard), abandoned the robot on the glacier.

Mohn and Njøs started their journey to the foothills of the Olav V Land glacier seven minutes before midnight. They were in permanent video contact (UMTS webcam) with the CCL. Exactly at midnight (Central European Time/also local Svalbard time), when the year 2008 turned into 2009, they reached Point Zero (78N, 17E) and prepared a platform for the robot, using a snow shovel. They also thrust the Slovenian national flag into the snow next to the robot. The action was performed in the complete dark (civil polar night) and the Live broadcast lasted 10 minutes, starting 31 December 2008 at 23:55, ending 1 January 2009 at 00:05.

Video of Performance

=== Ballettikka Internettikka: Nipponnikka (2009) ===
Nipponnikka was done on the Japanese island of Minami Torishima on 23 November 2009, at sunrise and was a Live Internet Broadcast. Stromajer and Zorman abandoned two robots in the Pacific Ocean.

The act of abandoning is the act of liberation: if you love something, set it free! Štromajer and Zorman therefore abandoned two of their Silverlit R/C Program-a-BOT robots (€36 in retail) in the loneliness of the Pacific Ocean, at the easternmost point of Japan, the Land of the Rising Sun—two suns, one for each robot!

Minami Torishima is an isolated island in the north-western Pacific Ocean. The hottest place in Japan, it is the easternmost Japanese territory, lying some 1,848 kilometres southeast of Tokyo. It takes about 45 minutes to walk around the triangular-shaped, low-lying island which has an area of 1.2 square kilometres. The island is unusual because the closer to the coast, the higher the elevation: the central area of the island is 1 metre below sea level whilst the coast is about 5 to 8 metres above. There is an airport and a radio station on the island. The island is presently used for weather observation, but little else.

Video of Performance

=== The Future of Ballettikka Internettikka (2009 - Present) ===
Igor wants to complete one more project with the robots. He plans on travelling to Antarctica to abandon another robot. He is abandoning the next robot in Antarctica as he wants the robots to be at every point on a compass. He has already placed them in the north and east, however, he said he will not be leaving one in the west, for unclear reasons. Igor said this isn’t the end of Ballettikka Internettikka.
