= Tinkebell =

Dutch artist

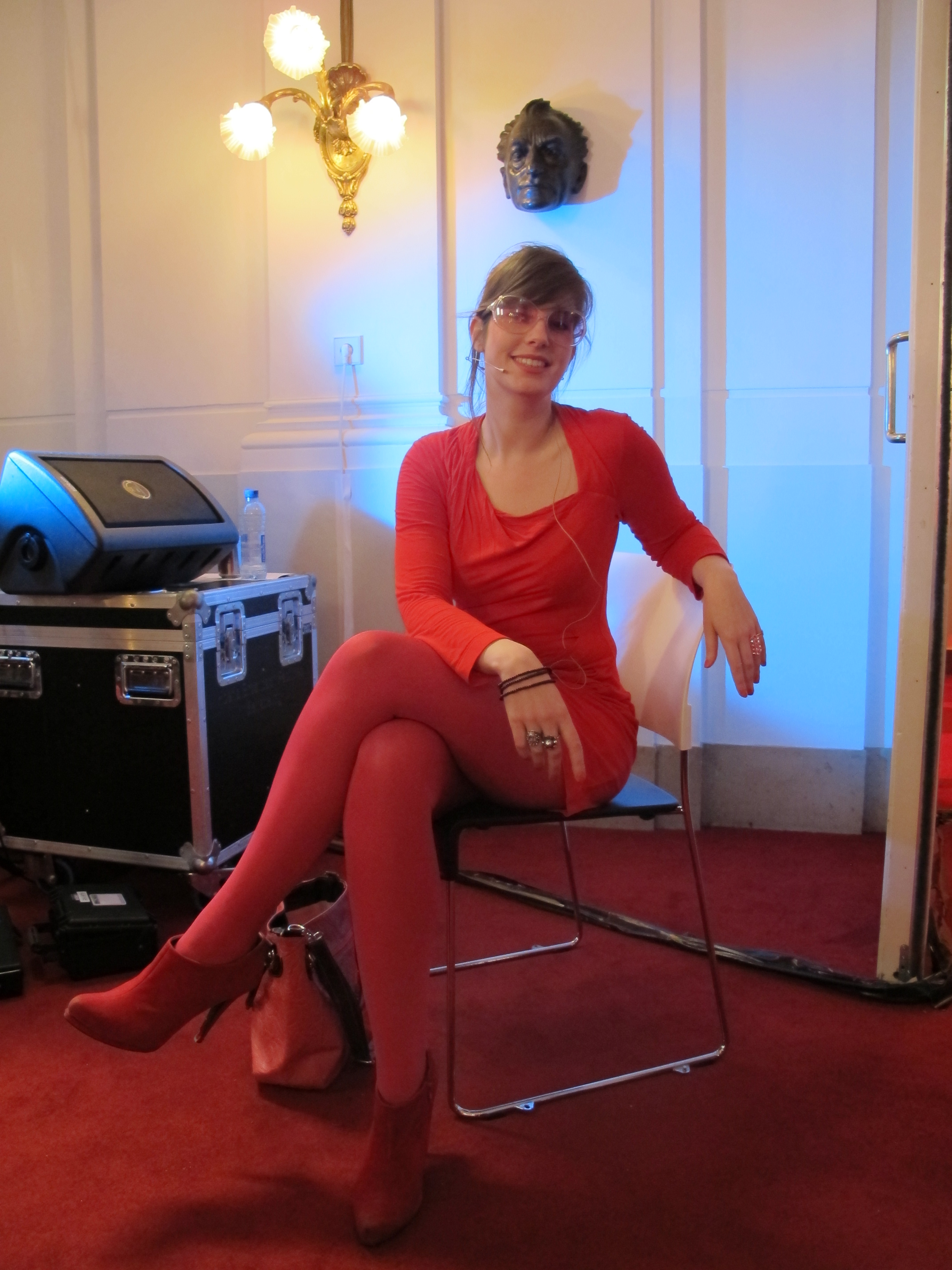
- Tinkebell at TEDxAmsterdam in 2012
- Born: Katinka Simonse; June 10, 1979 (age 47); Goes, Netherlands
- Education: Gerrit Rietveld Academie

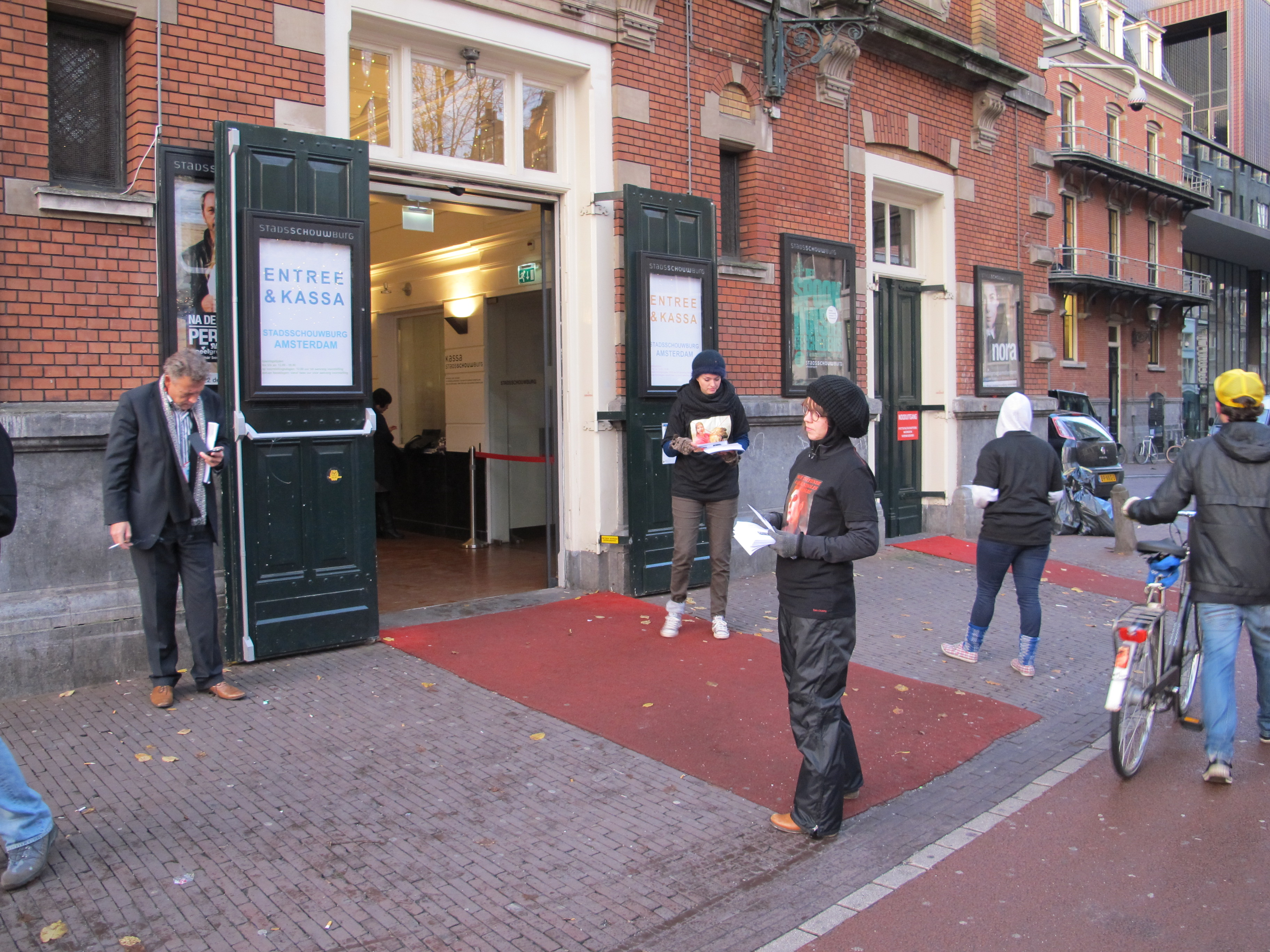
Protests against her appearance at TEDxAmsterdam

Katinka Simonse (born 10 June 1979), professionally known as Tinkebell, is a Dutch artist who engages with issues around animals and how people treat them.

== Career ==
Tinkebell's projects have English names, and are not translations from Dutch.

In 2004, Tinkebell gained national notoriety in the Netherlands with a handbag she fabricated using the fur of her own house cat. She indicated she had killed the animal herself, by breaking its neck and skinning it. The goal of this work was to raise the question why it is accepted in society that production animals like cows and pigs are killed for consumption, but doing the same to pets is not. According to Tinkebell, the cat, aged two, was depressed to the point where it could no longer be left at home unattended. She claimed the cat was actually very ill and would die of its disease.

During an eco-design fair in Platform 21 in Amsterdam, she offered people to buy 60 male live chicks or otherwise dump the chicks into a shredder, to show how male chicks are treated in the bioindustry.

In early 2008, Tinkebell again became a topic of conversation due to the exposition Save the pets, in which she had 95 hamsters running around in hamster balls in art gallery Masters in Amsterdam. She wanted to show how people treat their pets. Again, her basic concept was the dual morality people maintain in respect of animals, because nobody will protest a single hamster in a ball, but people will protest 95 hamsters in 95 balls. Again she was interviewed in several newspapers and Dutch TV-shows. On 24 January 2008, the Dutch animal welfare authority confiscated the hamsters. On 8 September 2009 and 6 May 2010, she was tried for the case in front of the police magistrate in Amsterdam. It was eventually referred to a Dutch court specifically for complex or serious cases. There she was tried on 7 January 2011. On 21 January 2011, the court declared the allegations not proven and acquitted miss Simonse.

Together with Dutch artists Jonas Staal and Daan Samson she is regarded as an exponent of a new category media artists. By taking up distinct positions in the media, social issues are being broached.

Tinkebell's work resulted in a storm of publicity and criticism multiple times, including hate mail and death threats. Some of the hate mail and death threats (about 1% in total) were collected and bundled. In cooperation with Coralie Vogelaar, the people sending them were researched and both the hateful messages (according to the authors 'over a hundred thousand') and their profiles were published in the 2009 book Dearest Tinkebell. The published information includes personal information of the people, like name, address and social media profiles. Vogelaar was responsible for the research in what she called "the armpit of the internet", that is personal weblogs and social media profiles.

In December 2012, she did a TEDx talk in Amsterdam. In this talk she tells about internet stories that appeared on blogs and on social media sites were fiction and/or gave a distorted vision of what actually had taken place. Google search results easily lead to these blogs and the result is that these stories became the new truth, leading to an even more controversial status as an artist.

She appeared in the third season of the television show De Verraders.
