= Ruth Catlow =

English artist-theorist and curator

- Born: 1968 (age 57–58); London, England
- Website: www.ruthcatlow.net

Ruth Catlow (born 1968) is an English artist-theorist and curator whose practice focuses on critical investigations of digital and networked technologies and their emancipatory potential. She is also the Director, with Marc Garrett, of the Furtherfield gallery, commons space, and online arts-writing platform based out of London, which the duo founded in 1997.

== Education and career ==
Catlow was born in London, England and earned an BA (Hons) in Sculpture from the Falmouth School of Art (1987-1991) before moving on to a master's degree in Networked Media Environments at Ravensbourne (college), graduating in 2006. She was also an academic and teacher, as Associate Senior Lecturer in Digital Media at Ravensbourne.

After 15 years in academia, Catlow shifted focus to her ongoing collaboration with partner Marc Garrett, Furtherfield. The pair had previously founded the HTTP Gallery together (a previous iteration of the current Furtherfield Gallery in Haringay, London), and had garnered industry acclaim for their critical and innovative programming. Catlow continues her role as Artistic Director at Furtherfield, whilst also occasionally being involved in external curatorial projects, such as Collaboration and Freedom – The World of Free and Open Source Art, an online collection for the Arts Council England and the P2P Foundation, which she curated with Marc Garrett in 2011.

As an artist, Catlow has participated in exhibitions at Givon Gallery, Tel Aviv, CCA, Glasgow, the Baltic Centre for Contemporary Art in Gateshead, Limehouse Town Hall, London and the Anna-Maria and Stephen Kellen Gallery and Sheila C. Johnson Design Center in New York to name a few, and her work has been featured on DVblog, the Rhizome Artbase and The Digital Kitchen. She has been the recipient of numerous awards, residencies, and other honours. In 2003, she was a recipient of a Low-fi Net Art Commission and she was selected for a research residency at the Tate Britain in 2016. Her work has been shown alongside internationally renowned artists like Yoko Ono and Cory Arcangel.

== Publications ==
As an academic, Catlow published numerous articles, including Paying Attention: Toward a critique of the attention economy and We Won't Fly For Art: Media Art Ecologies.

Since leaving academia to focus on her independent work and activities with Furtherfield, Catlow has continued to publish interdisciplinary texts, interviews, and commentaries - such as, Situating the Digital Commons. A conversation between Ruth Catlow and Tim Waterman, or Karen Blissett is Revolting, an interview with the groundbreaking digital artist/figure. She is also the author of several books, including Artists Re:Thinking Games with Marc Garrett and Corado Morgana. In late 2016, Catlow and Marc Garrett wrote the foreword to the book Intersecting Art and Technology in Practice: Techne/Technique/Technology edited by Camille C Baker and Kate Sicchio.

Catlow - together with her partner Marc Garrett - coined the term DIWO; Do It With Others. An extension of the punk DIY concept, DIWO is the concept of working creatively in a community that is often bound together or facilitated by digital networks and the internet. The pair wrote about their concept and artistic explorations of DIWO in a chapter called Do It With others (DIWO) E-mail Art in the 2009 volume Networks of Design edited by Jonathan Glynne, Fiona Hackney, and Viv Minton. She has been interviewed for The Guardian and in the book A Brief History of Working With New Media She was also featured as part of the series 100 Women of P2P by Commons Transition.

Catlow is a frequent speaker at conferences and symposia on contemporary art and networked technology, such as the Nam June Paik Conference: The Future Is Now at FACT Liverpool and Tate Liverpool in 2011; the Tenth International Conference on The Arts in Society in 2015 at the Imperial College London, where she was a plenary speaker; and at the Centre for Disruptive Media. She moderated a keynote discussion on the theme of play within the neo-liberalist system with well-known theorist and writer McKenzie Wark at the Haus der Kulturen der Welt in Berlin in 2015, as well as participating in a number of other panels and discussions as part of the Transmediale festival.

== Artistic works ==
Catlow often makes collaborative, interactive works that engage the audience directly in participatory and playful ways. Her project Play Your Place, a collaboration with the American artist Mary Flanagan, creates a real-world game environment that promotes community values and contributes to urban planning; the work has been shown at the Southbank Centre and the Tate Britain in London.

Catlow's piece Time is Speeding Up, commissioned for the exhibition We Are Not Alone, curated by Michael Szpakowski at 20-21 Visual Arts Centre, Scunthorpe, was another playful use of digital technology to point to deeper, even existential dilemmas of the human condition. Edward Picot writes, in the exhibition catalogue We Are Not Alone, that "the most noteworthy thing about it, by contrast with her other work, is the way in which her characteristic mixture of techniques, critique of digital culture, generosity of spirit and determination to engage with the audience are now contextualised and thrown into relief by a sharpening awareness of human frailty and the passing of time." The piece has also been praised in the art press for its innovative incorporation of blockchain technology in the programming of the work.

Her recent work has focused on the potential and risks of blockchain technology and the ways in which it is already shaping society. Catlow collaborated with Digital Catapult to create the short film The Blockchain: Change Everything Forever in 2016. Late in 2016, Catlow collaborated with Ben Vickers, curator of digital at Serpentine Galleries to create a Live Action Role-Playing Game Role Play Your Way to Budgetary Blockchain Bliss at the Institute of Networked Culture's MoneyLab, which aimed to educate participants about blockchain technology within a playful framework.
