= Gretta Louw =

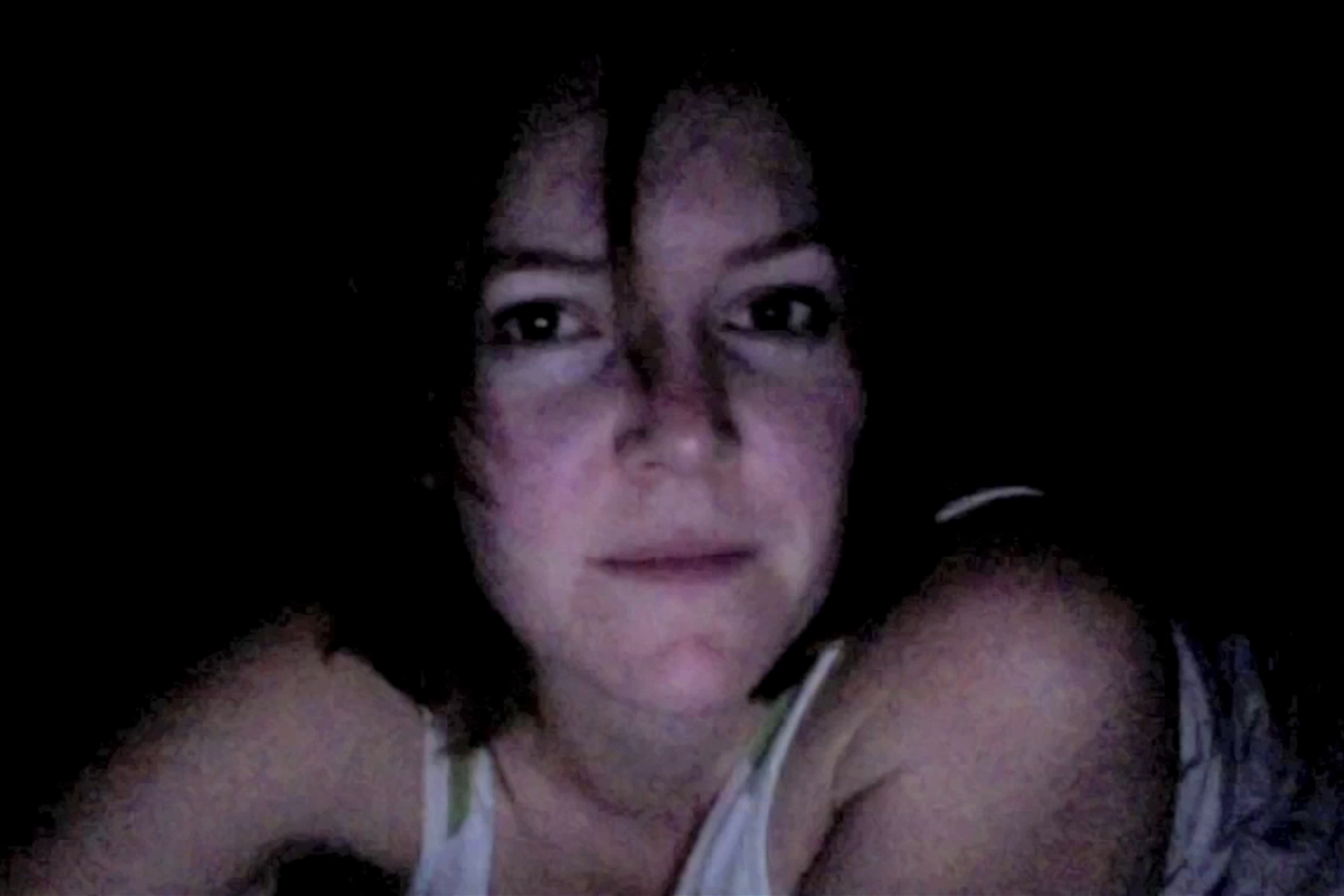
- Controlling_Connectivity, screenshot from networked performance at Art Laboratory Berlin, Gretta Louw, 2011.
- Born: 1981 (age 44–45); Dundee, South Africa
- Education: Bachelor of Arts (2001), and Honours in Psychology (2002), University of Western Australia.
- Known for: new media art, net art, digital art

Gretta Louw (born 1981) is a multi-disciplinary artist who has worked with artforms as varied as digital media and networked performance, installation and video art, and fibre art. She lives and works in Germany and Australia. Her artistic practice explores the potential of art as a means of investigating psychological phenomena, particularly in relation to new technologies and the internet. Her focus is on how new digital technologies are shaping contemporary experience.

== Biography ==
Gretta Louw was born in South Africa and grew up in Australia. She graduated in 2001 from the University of Western Australia with a Bachelor of Arts, and in 2002 completed her Honours degree in Psychology.

== Exhibitions ==
- OK. Video Flesh, Galeri Nasional Indonesia, Jakarta, Indonesia, 2011.
- Controlling_Connectivity (solo exhibition), Art Laboratory Berlin, 2011; curators: Regine Rapp und Christian de Lutz.
- Video Art For All, Fundação Oriente, Macau, 2012.
- Moving the Still, Art Basel Miami Beach, Miami, USA, 2012; curator: Nowness.
- On Off Moments, Grimmuseum Berlin, 2013; curator: Amelie Wedel.
- Weiss auf Weiss (solo exhibition), TEN Gallery, Mannheim, 2014; curator: Heinrich Gartentor, Solothurn, Schweiz.
- Hybrids, Stadtgalerie Mannheim, 2014; curator: Benedikt Stegmayer.
- Bitrates - GIFbites, Dar-ol-Hokoomeh Project at Shiraz Artist House, Shiraz, Iran, 2014; curators: Morehshin Allahyari und Daniel Rourke.
- Deltabeben, Kunstverein Ludwigshafen, Germany, 2014; curator: Barbara Auer.
- Me Vs Internet (solo exhibition), Stadtgalerie Mannheim, 2014; curator: Benedikt Stegmayer.
- Representation Vs Reality, AVU Gallery, Prague, 2014; curator: Benedikt Stegmayer.
- Net Work, PLATFORM Gastatelier, Munich, 2014; curator: Gretta Louw.
- Everybody Lies (On the internet), Pixxelpoint Festival, City Gallery, Nova Gorica, Slovenia, 2014; curator: Igor Štromajer.
- Radiance, Form Gallery, Perth, Australia, 2015; curator: Sharmila Wood.
- Jiggling Golems, Goethe Institute, Athens, 2015; curator: Mariana Ziku.
- Homo Faber - ARTour Biennale, Centre de la Gravure et de l’image Imprimée, La Louviere, Belgium, 2015; curator: Jacques Urbanska.
- 1984, Papierfabrik, Dachau, 2015; curator: Johannes Karl.
- Maintenance Mode, Public Space One, Iowa, USA, 2015; curator: Beatrice Drysdale.
- LAB 3.0, Unpainted Digital Art Fair, Munich, 2016; curator: Annette Doms.
- NARGIFSUS, Transfer Gallery, New York City, 2016; curators: Carla Gannis, Tina Sauerländer.
- Networking the Unseen, Furtherfield Gallery, London, 2016; curator: Gretta Louw.
- Monsters of the Machine, LABoral, Gijón, Spain, 2016; curator: Marc Garrett.
- Selfciety, whiteBOX Gallery, Munich, 2017; curator Benjamin Jantzen.
- No Secrets, Stadtmuseum München, Munich, 2017; curator: Rudolf Scheutle.

== Prizes and awards ==
- 2011: Karin Abt-Straubinger Stiftung Projektförderung
- 2012: Finalistin der OK.Video Art Preis
- 2014: Heinrich Vetter Preis der Stadt Mannheim
- 2016–2020: Atelier Stipendium der Landeshauptstadt München im Atelierhaus Baumstrasse
- 2016–2017: Bahnwärter Stipendium der Stadt Esslingen am Neckar

== Other projects ==
- Networking the Unseen: a curatorial project exploring contemporary indigeneity and what artists outside the European mainstream can teach us about digitalisation - with many collaborative works by Louw and the Warnayaka Art Centre (a Warlpiri Aboriginal Art and Cultural Association in Lajamanu, Northern Territory, Australia. The first iteration of the exhibition was shown at Furtherfield Gallery in London in 2016, and the second at Villa Merkel museum in Esslingen, Germany in 2017-2018.
- Avatar as Prosthesis: an exploration of the possibilities for artistic production and collaborative projects in the field of inclusive art practices opened up by digital avatars; Munich, 2016–2017.
- The Cloud: a series of ongoing tasks that incorporates performance, video, digital collages, installation etc. and addresses the marketing techniques around cloud computing.
- Gif Portrait: a project that allowed anyone to commission an animated digital art portrait of themselves or someone else and, in doing so, contribute to the development of a net-based gesamtkunstwerk. GIF Portrait is a radical re-thinking of the traditional genre of portraiture, capturing and representing you in a format that is fit for the digital age.
