= Sandra Becker =

German artist (born 1967)

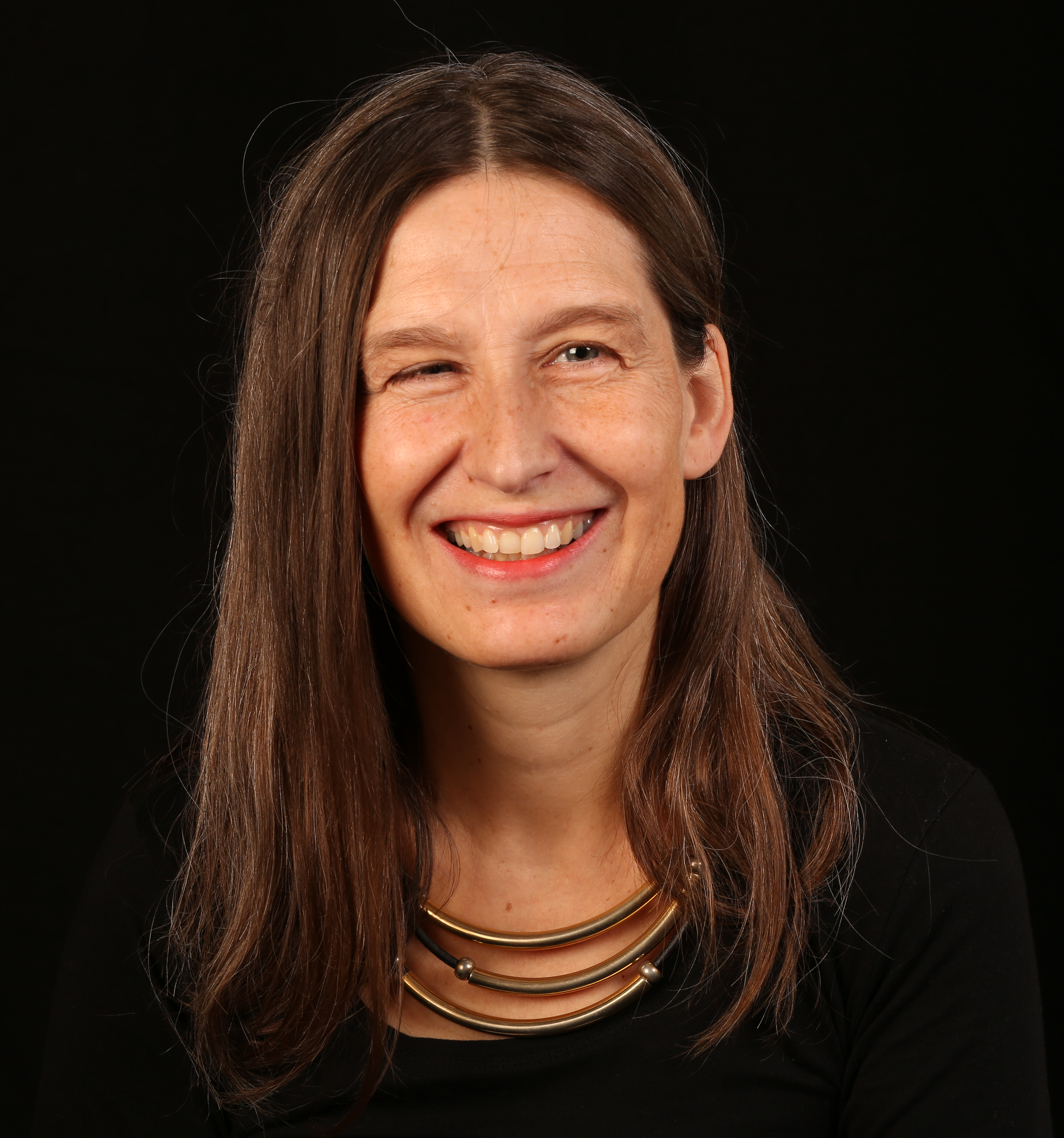
Sandra Becker (2017)

Sandra Becker (born 1967) is a Berlin-based video artist.

== Early life and education ==
Becker was born in Freiburg, the daughter of diplomats Volkmar Becker and Judge Gisela Maria Becker. She moved with her family at the age of eight to Turkey, where her father worked at the German Embassy in Ankara. In 1979 they moved to Lima, Peru, for three years. In 1982 they moved back to Germany.

In 1987, Becker went to New York City with her family where she worked as an Assistant Lighting Designer to Giles Hogya at the Jean Cocteau Repertory Theatre. Between 1987 and 1989 she studied Philosophy and Architecture at the University of Hamburg and Stuttgart, and Visual Communication at the University of Design Offenbach. At the invitation of Central St Martins College of Art and Design she moved to London in 1989 and graduated in 1991 with a Bachelor of Arts (Hons) degree in Theatre Design.

After graduating, Becker went back to Germany and worked as a designer at the State Theatre Mainz. In 1992 she continued her studies at the University of Art Berlin in Visual Communication where she studied under Valie Export, graduating with a Master of Arts degree. In 1993 she was invited by the Academy of Arts and Sciences of Russia to Saint Petersburg, where she worked at the Repin Institute. In the same year she wrote her thesis which addresses the themes of "arrival and leaving". This was followed by a Master Course in Film at the University of Art Berlin under Professor Heinz Emigholz, graduating with her film Waiting Room in 1995. She went on to receive the Young Talent Grant from the Berlin Cultural Senate and the DAAD scholarship to New York City.

== Career ==
Becker began teaching in 1996. During her time as visiting professor of artistic transformation processes at the University of Arts in Berlin between 2007 and 2009, she was part of a team of 11 female professors who adapted the project "Stille Post" for the syllabus. It is still used by the university as an important educational resource. She currently teaches at the Free University of Berlin and is co-director of the Media Workshop Berlin, part of the Historic Bethanien Art Center.

== Work ==
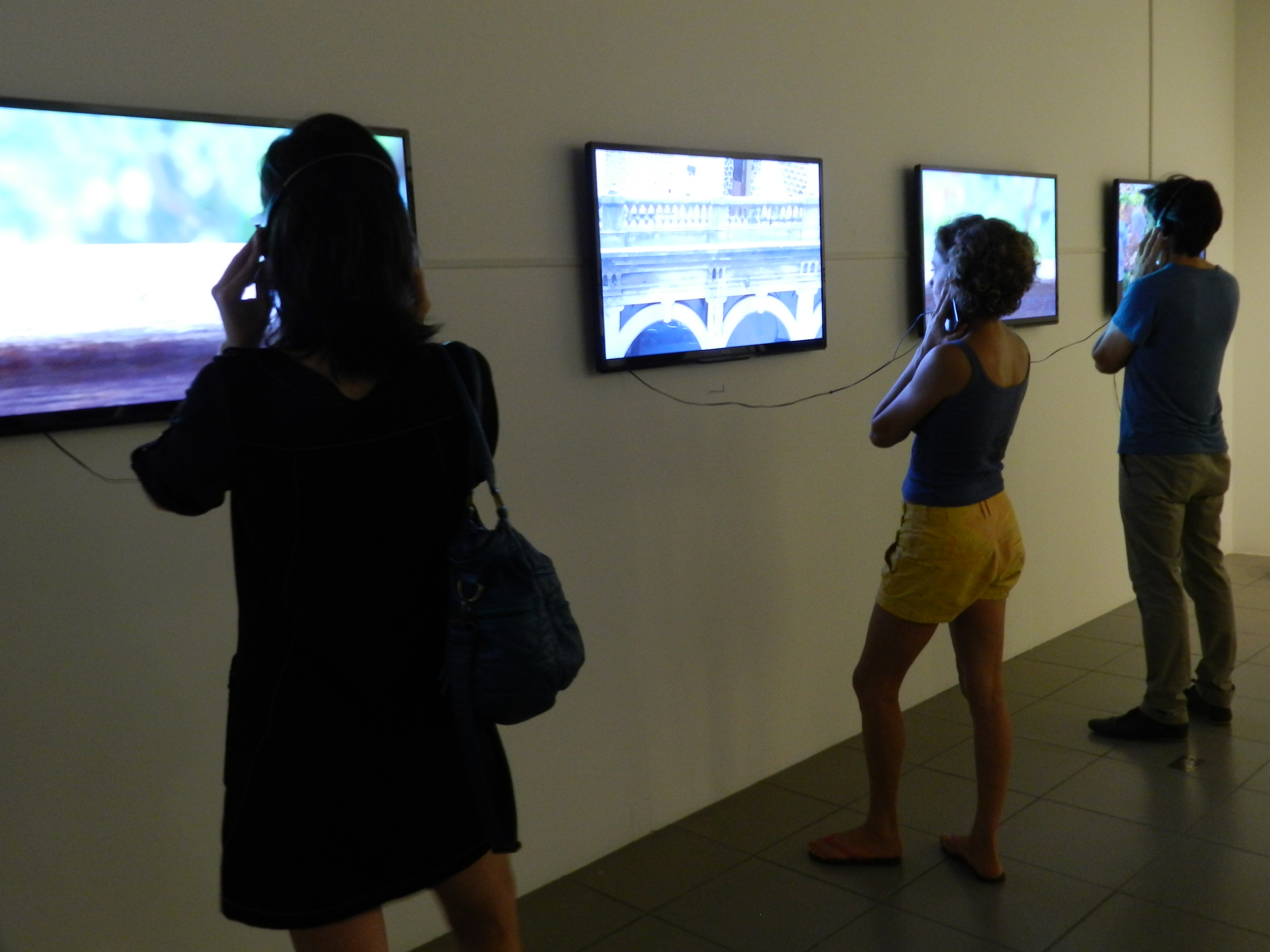
Solo-Exhibition Social Dissolve, Goethe-Institute Porto Alegre, Brasil, 2014

Becker's work appears in the collections of The Majdanek State Museum, Poland, The Euro Theater Central Bonn, The international collection of the Neuer Berliner Kunstverein, Berlin and BauNetz Media, Berlin. Notable solo exhibitions include "Social Dissolve" at the Goethe-Institute in Porto Alegre, Brazil (2014); "Breaking Point" at netfilmmakers, Copenhagen (2007); and "Interstices" at Kunstverein Würzburg (1996).

Becker has participated in many group exhibitions, including: "HeartEarth" at The Bethanien Art Center, Berlin (2016) "You Are Leaving the American Sector" at the ArtCenter South Florida Studios (2016); "Pattern Patterns" at Haus Schwarzenberg, Berlin (2013); "White Cubes Update 12" at the Verein Berliner Künstler (2012); "Phenomena of temporality" at the Fototriennale, Hamburg (2011); "15 years older Schwarzenberg" at gallery Neurotitan (2010); "Process N ° 7" at the process Galerie Berlin (2010); "Proto typing", an Exhibition of Art and Theory in Bremen, (2008); and “Stille Post!”, at the gallery of the Karl Hofer Society (2006). She showed her work together with Christine Hill at the South London Gallery.

== Awards ==
Becker received the 2006 Karl-Hofer award for "Stille Post!"

== Publications ==
- Time pieces: Video art since 1963, Marius Babias, Kathrin Becker, Sophie Goltz, nbk Berlin, Volume 4, (Walther König Verlag, Berlin 2013) ISBN 978-3-86335-074-1.
- 'Faserstoffprojekt' Ravensbrueck/Fuerstenberg Vergessen Erinnern Denkmal, edited by Peter Lang, Margit Miosga and Christoph Tannert (Kuenstlerhaus Bethanien, Berlin 2004) ISBN 3-932754-52-2
