= Dani Ploeger =

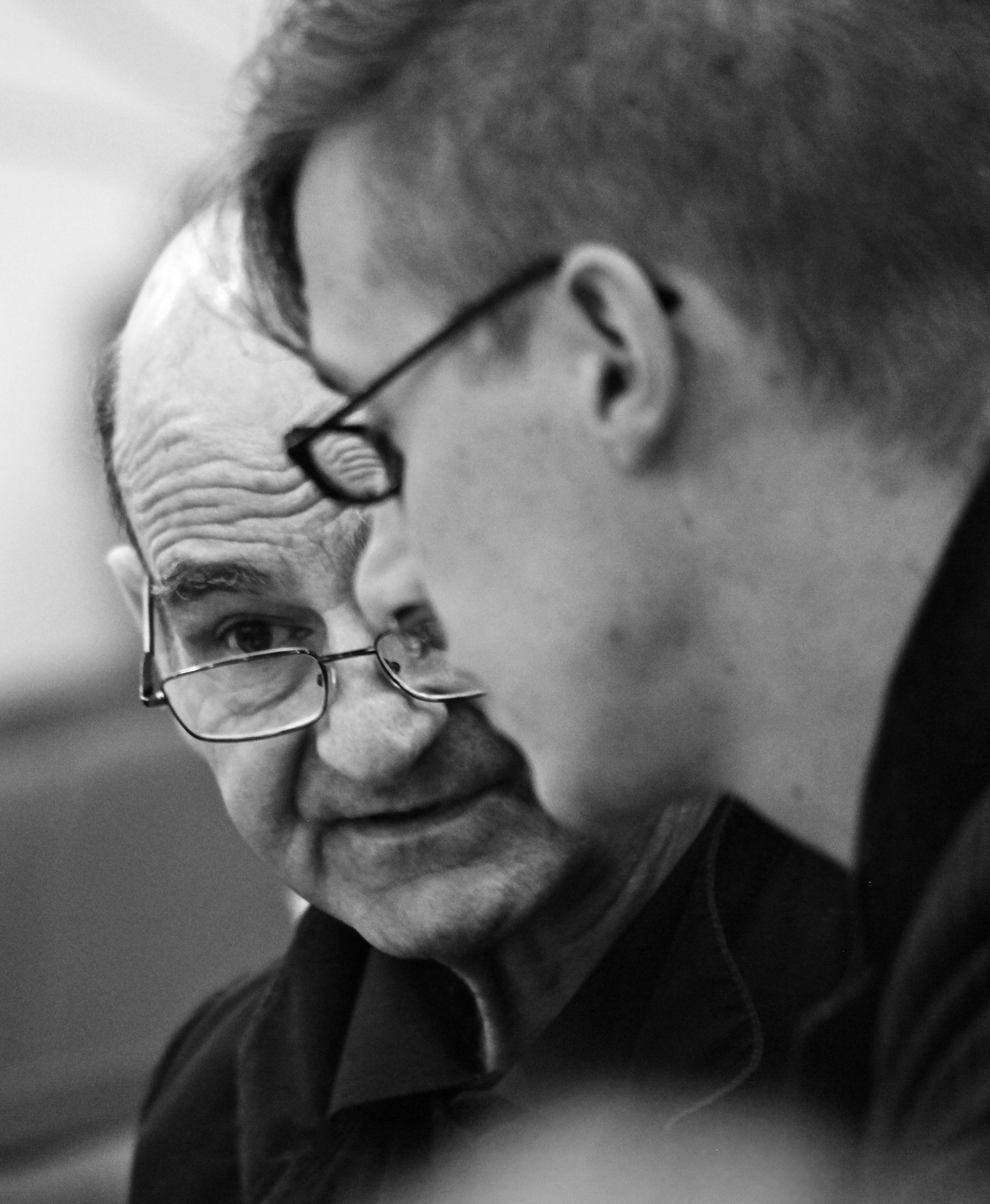
Stelarc and Ploeger (right) in 2011

Dr Daniël "Dani" Ploeger is a new media and performance artist.

== Life ==
Ploeger was born in the Netherlands and is currently living and working in the United Kingdom.. He holds a PhD from the University of Sussex, UK, and teaches at The Royal Central School of Speech and Drama, University of London.

== Work ==
Dani Ploeger's artwork focuses on the human body in connection to technology, sexuality and consumer culture.

His work frequently addresses issues connected to sexuality and technology. In ELECTRODE, an anal electrode connected to an EMG sensor is used to replicate the sphincter contraction pattern of a masturbating experimental subject. His work Ascending Performance features a Super 8 film of the naked artist and can be downloaded from MiKandi, an adult app store for Android phones. The sexually explicit and technology-critical aspects of Ploeger's work have led to some controversies and both amused and fierce media responses. He has been described as a 'post-Stelarc' artist and the 'Jimi Hendrix of the Sphincter'. Music critic Andy Hamilton has stated that there are "two assholes too many" in Ploeger's performance ELECTRODE and the German newspaper Der Freitag has suggested that he 'abuses gender criticism to inflate something as art'

Ploeger has created pieces addressing consumer culture and electronic waste, including Recycled Coil (2014), as part of which a body piercer installed a cathode ray television coil in Ploeger's abdomen for Art Hack Day Berlin, and the installation Back to Sender (2013–14), a collaboration with Nigerian performance artist Jelili Atiku. It consists of a pile of broken European electronic appliances which were collected on dump sites in Lagos, Nigeria, and subsequently sent back to Europe. In writing, interviews and public talks, Ploeger has critiqued consumption and planned obsolescence of digital devices, the technological utopianism of artists such as Stelarc and Atau Tanaka, and the sexualization of naked bodies in media culture He performed at Arse Elektronika in San Francisco, where his sex tech performance installations involved medical consumer technologies and explored themes around the technologized body, sexuality and vanity.
