= Furtherfield =

Art website

Furtherfield.org is an artist-led online community, arts organisation and online magazine. It creates and supports global participatory projects with networks of artists, theorists and activists. and offers "a chance for the public to present its own views and enter or alter various art discourses". Their lab-office and gallery currently operates out of in Finsbury Park in London, UK.

Furtherfield describes itself as:

"the collaborative work of artists, programmers, writers, activists, musicians and thinkers who explore beyond traditional remits; dedicated to the creation, promotion, and criticism of adventurous digital/networked media art work for public viewing, experience and interaction. Developing imaginative strategies in a range of digital and terrestrial media contexts, Furtherfield develops global, contributory projects that facilitate art activity simultaneously on the Internet, the streets and public venues."

== History and background ==
Furtherfield was founded in Harringay, London, England, in 1996 by artist-theorists Ruth Catlow and Marc Garrett. Inspired by the cultural value of collaboration as opposed to the traditional myth of individual artistic genius, Furtherfield has focused on the development of "artware" – software platforms for creating art – that engages its users in collaborative creative endeavours.

In 2004, Furtherfield opened HTTP, a physical gallery space for networked media art in North London, and since that time it has received funding from the Arts Council of England to support its activities. As well as its own projects, Furtherfield has contributed to other initiatives such as Node.London, hosting exhibitions and events, and contributing to the resulting book, Media Mutandis: a NODE.London Reader; and the travelling exhibition Game/Play (2006–07), co-curated with Q Arts, Derby. In 2007, Furtherfield was ranked in Dazed & Confused's Digital Top 50.

== Projects ==
Furtherfield's activities include artist presentations and exhibitions, residencies, reviews, theoretical texts, the Furtherfield blog, touring exhibitions, online exhibitions and events. All of these activities address the group's interest in collaborative, networked art, open source, media art ecologies and provocative media-art projects.

Specific projects that Furtherfield has developed include:

- Artists Re-Thinking the Blockchain;
- Artists Re-thinking Games;
- Zero Dollar Laptop Workshops;
- Media Art Ecologies;
- Visitors Studio;
- Rosalind – Upstart New Media Lexicon;
- House of Technologically Termed Practice;
- Furthernoise;
- 5+5=5 NetArtFilm;
- Netbehaviour – new media art mailing list;
- Do-It-With-Others (DIWO).

== People ==
Approximately 600 people are regular contributors and collaborators in Furtherfield activities, with an estimated global readership of 26,000. The organisation is run by a core group of six "current grafters" comprising founders Catlow and Garrett (Co-Directors), Charlotte Frost (Executive Director), Neil Jenkins (Technical Director of Projects), Giles Pender (Technical, Network and Logistics’ guru), Michael Szpakowski (Outreach and Education), Olga Panades Massanet (Co-editor and Workshop Facilitator) and Lauren Wright (Co-producer and Coordinator). A "neighbourhood crew" and "now-sleeping Furtherfielders" are also listed on the organisation's website.

Notable artists and curators that Furtherfield has worked with, in various capacities, include Shu Lea Cheang, Thomson & Craighead, Ben Vickers, They Are Here, James Bridle, Katriona Beales, Holly Herndon, Gretta Louw, Helen Varley Jamieson, Carla Gannis, and Anna Dumitriu amongst many others.
