= Kim Albrecht =

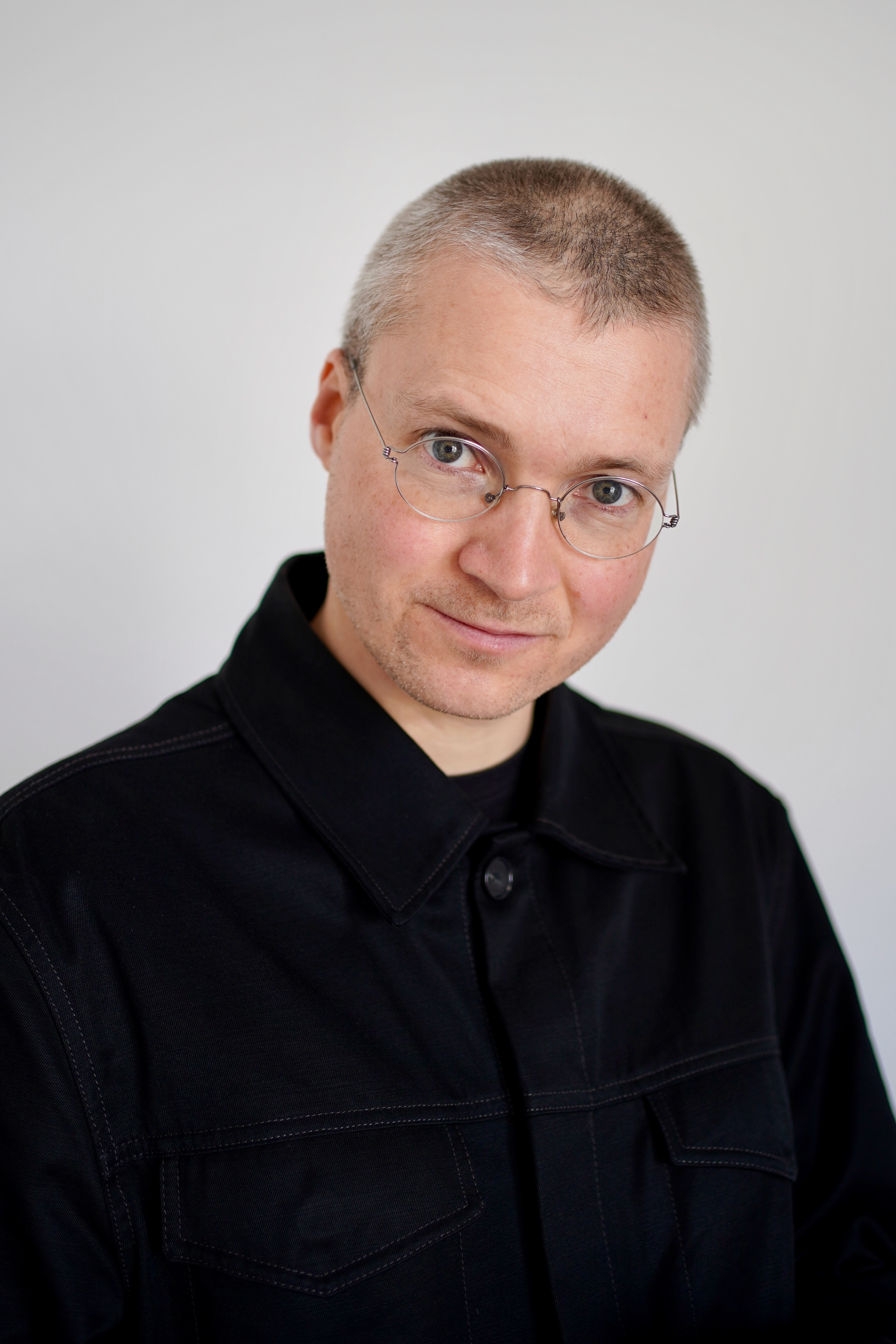
- Kim Albrecht, 2026
- Born: 1987 (age 38–39); Germany
- Education: BA Graphic Design; MA Interface Design; PhD Media Theory, University of Potsdam
- Occupations: Information designer; media artist; academic
- Employer: Folkwang University of the Arts
- Known for: Critical and investigative data visualization
- Title: Professor of Information Design
- Website: kimalbrecht.com

Kim Albrecht (born 1987) is a German information designer, media artist, and media scholar whose work uses data visualization to examine the structures and assumptions of computational systems. He is professor of information design at the Folkwang University of the Arts in Essen, and a principal at metaLAB (at) Harvard.

Albrecht's projects have addressed the sensor data of consumer devices (Artificial Senses), commercial facial recognition (Watching Machines Loving Grace), the knowledge structures of large language models (Artificial Worldviews), and the cosmic web. His work has been exhibited at the Harvard Art Museums, the Ars Electronica Center, the ZKM Center for Art and Media Karlsruhe, and the Cooper Hewitt, Smithsonian Design Museum, and is held in the permanent collections of the latter three institutions.

== Early life and education ==
Albrecht was born in 1987. He completed a bachelor's degree in graphic design and a master's degree in interface design, and received a doctorate in media theory from the University of Potsdam in 2023 with a dissertation titled Insight by de—sign: A Calculus of Computation, supervised by Jan Distelmeyer and Birgit Schneider.

== Career ==
Between 2015 and 2017 Albrecht worked as a designer and research associate at the Center for Complex Network Research (BarabásiLab) under Albert-László Barabási, then at Northeastern University, where he was embedded in a team of network scientists and cosmologists. He joined metaLAB (at) Harvard, a research group affiliated with the Berkman Klein Center, in 2017, and later became a principal of the lab. He co-founded and was director of metaLAB (at) Berlin. In spring 2022 he held a residency at the ZKM Center for Art and Media Karlsruhe.

From 2023 to 2024 Albrecht held a professorship at the Konrad Wolf Film University of Babelsberg. Since 2025 he has been professor of information design at the Folkwang University of the Arts, where he teaches information design, computational design, and data visualization. He has previously taught at the Harvard Graduate School of Design, the University of Applied Sciences Potsdam, the Strelka Institute, and the Muthesius Academy.

In June 2025 Albrecht co-organized the Data | Art symposium at Harvard University, co-hosted by metaLAB and the Barabási Lab, together with Jeffrey Schnapp and Albert-László Barabási. The two-day conference brought together artists, technologists, scientists, and designers working on the relationship between data and aesthetic practice; Albrecht's own work Post_Networks was among the pieces shown.

== Work ==
=== Network and scientific visualization ===
While at the BarabásiLab, Albrecht produced The Network Behind the Cosmic Web (2016), an interactive model of the large-scale structure of the universe. Working from simulation data covering roughly 24,000 galaxies and over 100,000 connections between them, the project compared several algorithms for constructing a network from galaxy distributions, allowing users to switch between models based on proximity, galaxy size, and nearest neighbours. Albrecht described the work as a shift from treating the cosmic web as a metaphor to modelling it as an actual network. The project drew wide coverage in the technology and science press, was exhibited in the 2019 Cooper Hewitt Design Triennial and in the BarabásiLab. Hidden Patterns exhibition at ZKM, and was acquired for the permanent collections of Cooper Hewitt and ZKM.

Albrecht later noted that traffic to the project rose again weeks after publication when religious blogs and news sites circulated it as an image of the universe seen from a divine perspective, and has used the episode to argue that visualizations are not objective representations but negotiations between researchers, data, designer, and viewer.

Science Paths (2016) visualized research by Roberta Sinatra and colleagues on the timing of scientific impact, allowing users to explore the publication records of some 10,000 scientists across seven disciplines and examine the relationship between career stage and a researcher's highest-impact work. Albrecht has described his approach to such projects as treating design not as decoration or communication but as an instrument for producing insight.

=== Machine perception and artificial intelligence ===
Artificial Senses (2017), made with metaLAB and supported by the Berkman Klein Center, visualizes the unprocessed sensor data that phones and computers generate, location, orientation, touch, audio, and camera input, in order to make the machine's own mode of registering the world perceptible rather than translating it into familiar human terms. Albrecht has described the sensors' apparent precision as misleading: a location request may return coordinates accurate to within centimetres, yet repeated requests from a stationary device return continually shifting positions. Writing for Triennale Milano, he situated the project in relation to Harun Farocki's concept of the operational image, arguing that the visualizations are deliberately not instruments for a utilitarian task but attempts to map machine operation itself. The project was shown in the Machine Experience exhibition at the Harvard Art Museums Lightbox Gallery, and is part of the permanent exhibition of the Ars Electronica Center.

Watching Machines Loving Grace (2021) applies commercial facial recognition software to photographs from the Harvard Art Museums' American Professional Photographers Collection, foregrounding what the software discards. The work draws attention to the reductive operation by which computer vision crops rectangles from an image to estimate age, gender, or expression while stripping away the surrounding context. It was exhibited in Curatorial A(i)gents, a metaLAB group exhibition at the Harvard Art Museums Lightbox Gallery from March to July 2022.

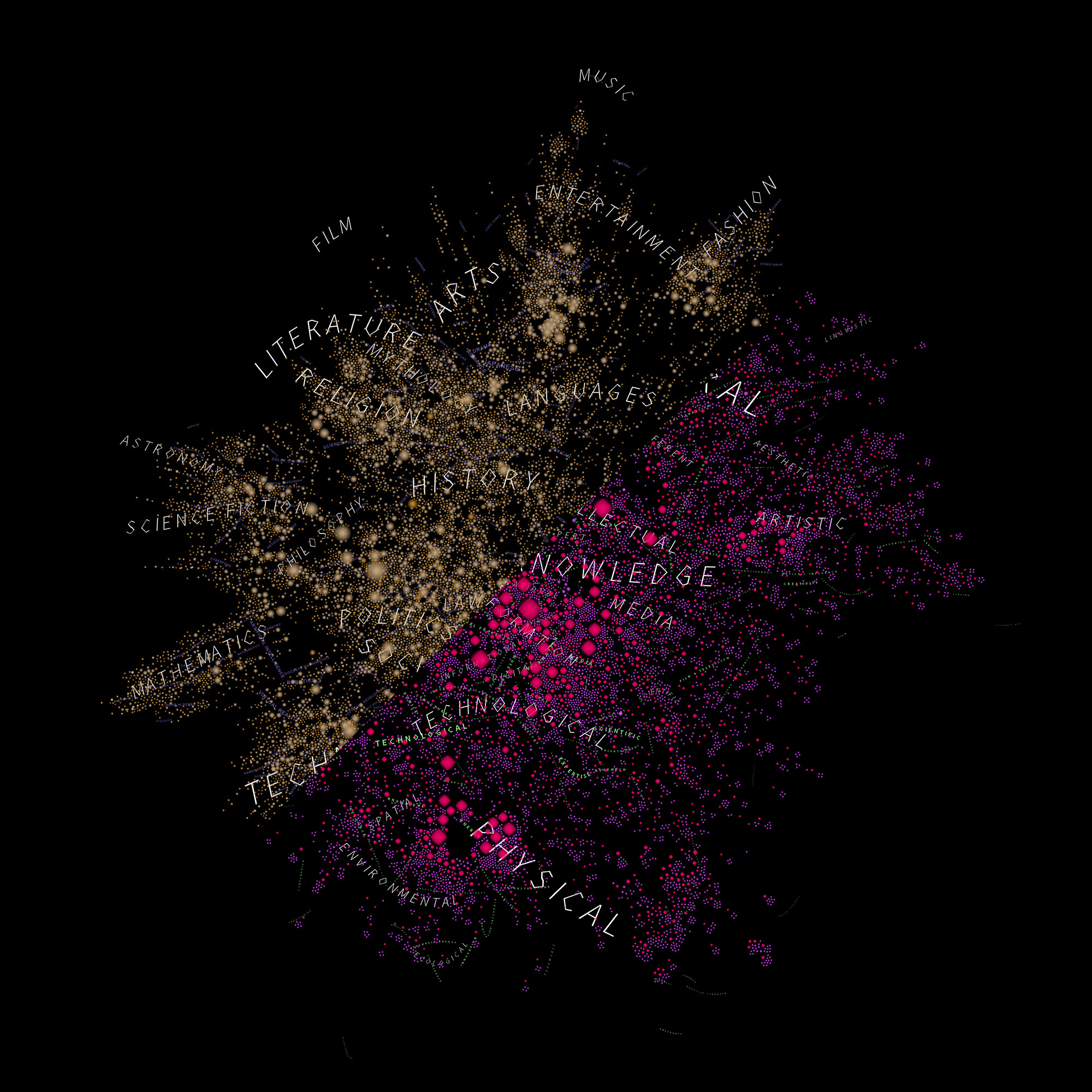
Artificial Worldviews is a series of inquiries into the system underlying ChatGPT about its descriptions of the world.

Artificial Worldviews (2023) maps the knowledge structure of ChatGPT. Albrecht first prompted the GPT-3.5 application programming interface to enumerate the categories of knowledge it possessed, yielding 31 fields and 425 subfields, then recursively queried the people, objects, places, and ideas associated with each combination; the resulting graph contains more than 32,000 nodes drawn from 1,764 API calls. A second dataset repeated the method for the term "power". Among the findings, the system named men roughly three times as often as women and returned "Caucasian" as one of its most frequent ethnic designations, while the figure it associated most widely across fields was the marine biologist Rachel Carson. Albrecht framed the method as an alternative to interpretability research on model internals, arguing that a system's worldview can be approached through its outputs, much as humans understand one another by conversing rather than by inspecting brain structures. A visualization from the project illustrated Nature's Nature's 10 feature in December 2023, the year the list included ChatGPT as a "non-person" entry.

=== Social and political subjects ===
Their Names (2020), made with Matthew Battles, lists over 28,000 people who were killed during encounters with police in the United States between January 2000 and the murder of George Floyd in May 2020, using data compiled by the nonprofit Fatal Encounters. The project deliberately foregrounds individual names and the reports behind each record rather than aggregate statistics. #MeToo Anti-Network (2021), developed with conceptual support from Catherine D'Ignazio, Cole Martin, and Battles, visualizes the #MeToo movement through the mass of tweets that received little or no attention. Albrecht has described the project as a constructivist approach to designing with data, reversing the usual question of which representation fits a dataset in favour of asking what the data should be imagined as.

== Exhibitions and collections ==
Albrecht's work has been exhibited at the Harvard Art Museums, the Ars Electronica Center, the ZKM Center for Art and Media Karlsruhe, the Cooper Hewitt, Smithsonian Design Museum, the Ludwig Museum Budapest, the Kunsthaus Graz, the Istanbul Contemporary Art Museum, the Four Domes Pavilion in Wrocław as part of the WRO Media Art Biennale, and the Cube design museum. Works by Albrecht are held in the permanent collections of Cooper Hewitt, ZKM, and the Ars Electronica Center.

== Awards ==
Albrecht's projects have been recognized by the Information is Beautiful Awards on several occasions, including for Meteorites 1900–2000 (2013), The Network Behind the Cosmic Web (2016), Science Paths (2017), and Artificial Senses (2018).

== Selected publications ==
=== Books ===
- Albrecht, Kim (2025). Insight by de-sign: A Calculus of Computation. Reihe des Brandenburgischen Zentrums für Medienwissenschaften (ZeM). Berlin: Kulturverlag Kadmos. ISBN 978-3-86599-581-0. Originally submitted as a doctoral dissertation at the University of Potsdam, 2023, and available in open access.

=== Articles and papers ===
- Albrecht, Kim Frederic (2022). "Situating #MeToo: A Constructivist Perspective on Designing With Data". diid — disegno industriale industrial design (78): 10. doi:10.30682/diid7822n. ISSN 2785-2245.
- Albrecht, Kim Frederic (2025). Artificial Worldviews. xCoAx 2025: 13th Conference on Computation, Communication, Aesthetics & X. Dundee. pp. 167–181. doi:10.34626/2025_xcoax_006.
- Albrecht, Kim (2024). "Eternal, Data, Decay". Driving the Human (PDF). ZKM Center for Art and Media Karlsruhe.
- Coutinho, B. C.; Hong, S.; Albrecht, K.; et al. (2016). "The Network Behind the Cosmic Web". arXiv:1604.03236 [astro-ph.CO].
