= Arthur Elsenaar =

Dutch artist, engineer and hacker

Arthur Elsenaar (born in Naarden, Netherlands, 1962) is an artist, engineer and hacker whose work explores computer-controlled human facial expression.

== Life ==
Elsenaar studied at the Academie Minerva in Groningen, Netherlands. Before he became active as an artist he worked as an engineer and presenter for pirate radio stations in the Netherlands. He teaches at the ArtScience Interfaculty at the Royal Academy of Art in The Hague.

== Work ==
Elsenaar is known for his work on electro-facial choreography: the use of electrical stimulation of the facial musculature to alter facial expression. His work includes Huge Harry (1997) and Perfect Paul - On freedom of facial expression (2012), both of which are lecture performances where a computer program narrates to the audience whilst Elsenaar's facial musculature is stimulated to demonstrate different possibilities of electro-facial choreography.

His work Face Shift (2005) has been acquired by the Stedelijk Museum in Amsterdam for their permanent collection, and he has won several awards including an honorary mention at the Prix Ars Electronica 1997 and the Technarte Best Speaker Award.
