= Igor Štromajer =

Igor Štromajer (born December 29, 1967, in Maribor, Slovenia) is a multimedia artist who describes himself as "an intimate mobile communicator".

His work Intima is a web-based fictional biography of an astronaut.

== See also ==
- Intima Virtual Base

== Sources ==
- Baumgärtel, Tilman (2001). net.art 2.0 - New Materials towards Net art. Nürnberg: Verlag für Moderne Kunst Nürnberg. pp. 134–141. ISBN 3-933096-66-9.
