= Jonas Staal =

Dutch artist (born 1981)

Jonas Staal (born 1981 in Zwolle) is a Dutch visual artist. His work deals with the relationship between art, democracy, and propaganda and has often generated public debate.

== Works ==
=== The Geert Wilders Works (2005–2008) ===
From 2005 to 2008, Staal was prosecuted by the Public Prosecutors' Office for threatening Party for Freedom politician Geert Wilders. This was the result of a project that Staal realized anonymously in April that year entitled The Geert Wilders Works, which consisted of twenty-one so-called ‘memorial works’ comprising a photo collage and framed portrait by Wilders, white roses, tealight candles and a cuddly bear in the public space of Rotterdam and The Hague. Even though police spokesmen stated not to know whether the installations were meant as a threat or sign of public support, Wilders decided to report the events to the police as being a personal life threat. Once Staal announced the work to be his and voluntarily reported himself to the police in Rotterdam, he was arrested and prosecuted for threatening a politician with death. Staal considered the trials to be part of his work and had invitations designed and printed to announce the court case as a ‘public debate’ in which key figures in the trial were presented as actors in a play entitled The Geert Wilders Works – A Trial I-II. The trials took place in 2007 in the Cantonal Court in Rotterdam and in 2008 in the Court of Justice in The Hague. Staal wrote his plea as a manifesto, which was published in the cultural section of the Dutch newspaper NRC Handelsblad.

=== Art, Property of Politics I-IV (2010–2012) ===
In 2010 Staal realized the exhibitions Art, Property of Politics and Art, Property of Politics II: Freethinkers’ Space, in 2011 Art, Property of Politics III: Closed Architecture and in 2012 Art, Property of Politics IV: Freethinkers' Space in which he researched the role of contemporary art in the political process. The first part took place in exhibition space TENT. in Rotterdam, during the municipal elections of 2010, in which he showed the artworks of all parties involved in the elections. The second part took place in the Van Abbemuseum in Eindhoven, the Netherlands and existed of artworks that were selected by the liberal People's Party for Freedom and Democracy (Volkspartij voor Vrijheid en Democratie, VVD) and the far-right Party for Freedom (Partij voor de Vrijheid, PVV) in their so-called ‘Freethinkers’ Space’: and exhibition space that the parties opened in Dutch parliament for artists that had dealt with religious (Islamic) censorship. The third part opened in Extra City in Antwerp, and continued in the form of a theater piece in Frascati in Amsterdam. Central in the project is a thesis entitled Closed Architecture (2004) written by the far-right MP Fleur Agema, number two on the list of the Dutch Freedom Party (Partij voor de Vrijheid, PVV). The thesis comprises a sketch for a new prison model, which Agema has developed during her master's degree in Interior Design. In the project Staal expanded Agema's sketches into a fully developed model. Moreover, it investigates the extent to which her earlier architectural work is the blueprint from which she now exerts an influence on current government policies, and hence the organization of our present society. The fourth part took place in the Van Abbemuseum in Eindhoven and in art space De Appel in Amsterdam as a result of an open call made by Rogier Verkroost, politician for the social-liberal Democrats 66 party, and GreenLeft politician Jesse Klaver to immediately re-open the Freethinkers’ Space that had been closed in 2011 by the liberal VVD and extreme-right PVV. The creation of these new Freethinker's spaces was supported by Staal and the museum. Verkroost's and Klaver's Freethinkers‘ Spaces opened in September 2012, followed in Amsterdam by a Freethinkers’ Space curated by Carolien Gehrels, alderman for arts and culture for the Labour Party in Amsterdam.

=== New World Summit (2012–...) ===
In May 2012 Staal announced in his pamphlet “Art in Defense of Democracy” the establishment of the artistic and political organization New World Summit. This organization aims to provide parliaments for stateless political organizations that are being placed “outside” of democracy, for example by use of so-called international designated lists of terrorist organizations that block their bank accounts and result in an immediate travel ban, relegating them to the “edge” of the political system.

The first edition of the New World Summit, taking place on May 4 and 5, 2012, in the Sophiensaal in Berlin, hosted four political and three juridical representatives of blacklisted organizations, such as the National Democratic Front of the Philippines (NDF), the Kurdish Women Movement, the Basque Independence Movement and the National Liberation Movement of Azawad (MNLA). According to Staal, his organization wants to explore at what level art can operate as an instrument to create an “alternative political space” as politics is unable to act upon the promise of what he calls a “fundamental democracy.” The second edition of the New World Summit took place on December 29, 2012, in de Waag in Leiden, the Netherlands, and focused on Professor Jose Maria Sison, the founder of the Communist Party of the Philippines (CPP) and its armed wing, the New People's Army (NPA), both of which are internationally blacklisted. Sison, who lives in exile in the Netherlands, debated several politicians, lawyers, public prosecutors and judges on his case. The 3rd New World Summit was announced to take place early 2013 in Kochi, India, in the context of the 1st Kochi-Muziris Biennale. For this occasion, an open air parliament was built in front of a former British colonial complex, but by order of the State Intelligence, flags in the parliament were painted over and three members of the summit were accused of material support to blacklisted organizations. The fourth New World Summit took place from September 19–21, 2014 in the Royal Flemish Theater in Brussels, bringing together twenty representatives of what the organization describes as "stateless states," such as representatives of organizations in Kurdistan, Somaliland, West Papua and Azawad. The New World Summit in this context also speaks of their work as the "art of the stateless state."

In October 2015 Jonas Staal announced in different interviews that the fifth summit would take place in Rojava, a region declared autonomous by Kurdish revolutionaries in the northern part of Syria in 2011, and would include a celebration of the start of construction of a new public parliament developed together with the Democratic Self-Administration of Rojava. The New World Summit in Rojava took place on October 16–17, 2015 in the city of Derîk, Cezîre canton, and included speakers from the Democratic Self-Administration of Rojava as well as an international delegation, amongst which representatives from Catalonia, Scotland and the Amazigh community. At the end of the two-day summit, the participants gathered at the building site of the new public parliament, where Minister of Foreign Affairs of Cezîre Canton Amina Osse and Staal announced the construction as a symbol of the Rojava revolution and of the friendship with other stateless peoples from all over the world. According to articles by journalists traveling with the international delegation to the summit in Rojava, a second part of the New World Summit in the autonomous region is to take place in the finished parliament, early 2016.

Together with BAK, basis voor actuele kunst, Utrecht, in 2013 the New World Academy was founded, which invites stateless political groups to develop collaborative projects with artists and students. In 2014, BAK also hosted the first New World Embassy of Azawad, a temporal embassy for the unacknowledged state of Azawad, developed by Staal and writer and National Liberation of Azawad (MNLA) representative Moussa Ag Assarid.

=== Other projects ===
Staal often works in multidisciplinary projects, together with, among others, writer Vincent W.J. van Gerven Oei. In collaboration with him and theater group Wunderbaum, he realized the project The Plays of Cho Seung-Hui: Richard McBeef, a performance of the script with the same title writer by the American-Korean high school shooter Cho Seung-Hui.

With visual artist Hans van Houwelingen and the Amsterdam Labour Party (PvdA) elderman of art and culture Carolien Gehrels he realized the project Allegories of Good and Bad Government in artspace W139 in Amsterdam. The project consisted of a four-day debate from May 1–4 between eight politicians and artists. In 2014 the collaboration continued in the project Beyond Allegories consisting of a nine-hour debate on May 9 in the municipal parliament of Amsterdam, during which artists and politicians debated collaboratively developed proposals on the "role of art in political governance, mobilization and action."

From January 9–11 the artist worked together with dramaturg Florian Malzacher and curator Joanna Warsza to organize the first "Artist Organizations International" in Hebbel am Ufer theater in Berlin, announced as an assembly of “over twenty organizations, founded by artists, confronting the current crises in politics, economy, education, immigration, and ecology.” Malzacher explained that the participating organizations were “all part of the current shift from artists working in the form of temporary projects to building long-term organizational structures”, followed by Staal saying that “Different than the singular commodified artwork, the artist organization potentially proposes a restructuring of social relations as such.” The conference was reported to be conflictuous on several occasions, both towards the organizers, and amongst participating artist organizations.

== Bibliography ==
- 2019: Propaganda Art in the 21st Century, MIT Press, ISBN 9780262042802
- 2015: New World Academy Reader #5: Stateless Democracy, ed., in collaboration with Dilar Dirik and Renée In der Maur / BAK, basis voor actuele kunst, Utrecht, ISBN 978-90-77288-22-1
- 2014: New World Academy Reader #4: The Art of Creating a State, ed., in collaboration with Moussa Ag Assarid / BAK, basis voor actuele kunst, Utrecht, ISBN 978-90-77288-21-4
- 2014: Nosso Lar, Brasília: Spiritism - Modernism - Architecture, Capacete, Rio de Janeiro, and Jap Sam Books, Heijingen, ISBN 978-94-90322-45-8
- 2013: New World Academy Reader #3: Leaderless Politics, ed., in collaboration with Dirk Poot / BAK, basis voor actuele kunst, Utrecht, ISBN 978-90-77288-20-7
- 2013: New World Academy Reader #2: Collective Struggle of Refugees, ed., in collaboration with We Are Here / BAK, basis voor actuele kunst, Utrecht, ISBN 978-90-77288-19-1
- 2013: New World Academy Reader #1: Towards a Peoples Culture, ed., in collaboration with Jose Maria Sison / BAK, basis voor actuele kunst, Utrecht, ISBN 978-90-77288-18-4
- 2011: Art, Property of Politics III: Closed Architecture, Onomatopee, Eindhoven, ISBN 978-90-78454-75-5
- 2010: Power?... To Which People?!, Jap Sam Books, Heijningen, ISBN 978-94-90322-02-1
- 2009: Post-propaganda, The Netherlands Foundation for Visual Arts, Design and Architecture, Amsterdam, ISBN 978-90-76936-22-2
- 2009: Activism Doubt, with Harmen de Hoop, Onomatopee, Eindhoven, ISBN 978-90-78454-36-6
- 2009: Follow Us Or Die. Works from the high school shooters selected by Vincent W.J. van Gerven Oei and Jonas Staal, Atropos Press, New York/Dresden, ISBN 0-9819462-5-9
