= Tina Sauerlaender =

Curator and write in Berlin

Tina Sauerlaender (born 4 February 1981 in Melsungen, Germany) is an independent curator and writer. She is the co-founder and co-director of peer to space, a platform and exhibition hub for curatorial projects founded in Munich, Germany in 2010.

== Biography ==
Tina Sauerlaender studied art history, business economics and Bavarian ecclesiastical history at LMU Munich, Germany. She holds a PhD from the University of Art in Linz, Austria. Sauerlaender's professional career started at the international exhibition space Haus der Kunst in Munich in 2007. In 2011, she moved to Berlin to work at a contemporary photography gallery, Camera Work. Afterwards, she worked as the collection curator of the Haupt Collection from 2013 until 2015. Since 2013, Sauerlaender has worked as an independent curator and writer. She organizes and curates international art exhibitions in the context of the digital age. She primarily focuses on the impact of the digital and the Internet on our society and on individual lives. She curated the exhibition The Unframed World. Virtual Reality as Artistic Medium for the 21st Century at House of Electronic Arts Basel, Switzerland in 2017. She is the co-founder of Radiance, an international online research platform for artistic Virtual Reality experiences. She is the founder and co-director of the SALOON, a network for women in Berlin's the art scene with branches in Hamburg, Paris and Vienna.

== Peer to space ==
Sauerlaender founded the exhibition hub peer to space together with Maja Block in Munich in 2010. From 2014 to 2017, Sauerlaender ran peer to space on her own in Berlin. Since 2017, Peggy Schoenegge has joined as a partner and part of the team. peer to space is a mindset which combines the concept of peer-to-peer networking with the ideas of space, freedom and openness to artistic expression. peer to space is not an actual place but occupies other spaces to realize exhibitions and further projects related to art dealing within the world we live today. Consequently, it focuses on contemporary art which reflects and visualizes current affairs and interests of our time, mainly the digital and the internet. Current exhibitions include artistic virtual reality experiences or augmented reality.

== Radiance ==
Radiance is a research platform and database for VR art. Its mission is to present artists working with VR from all over the world to create visibility and accessibility for VR art and for faster adoption of virtual reality technologies. The platform works closely with artists, institutions and independent curators to select the highest quality of virtual art for public institutional exhibitions. Since 2021, Radiance VR provides a VR App that presents a wide range and curated selection of VR experiences.

== SALOON ==
Founded by Sauerlaender in 2012, the SALOON is an international network for women working in the art scene as curators, artists, journalists, or in galleries, museums or universities. Sauerlaender and has been running the SALOON Berlin together with Alina Heinze, director of The Kennedys (museum), and the artist Ornella Fieres. The name refers to the former male domains of the Salon (Paris) and the western saloons. According to Sauerlaender, the network gives members a chance for visibility, building trust in one another and having people to rely on.

== Curated exhibitions by Sauerlaender ==
- Touching from a Distance II – Transmediation in the Digital Age, Goethe-Institut Toronto (CAN), with: Jonas Blume, Manja Ebert, Ornella Fieres, Aron Lesnik, Lorna Mills, Sarah Oh-Mock, Julia Charlotte Richter, Anna Ridler, The Swan Collective, Tina Wilke, 22 March to 23 May,
- Speculative Cultures: A Virtual Reality Exhibition, Sheila Johnson Design Center Parson School of Design/ The New School, curated with Erandy Vergara and Peggy Schoenegge, with: Morehshin Allahyari, Scott Benesiinaabandan, Matias Brunacci, Yu Hong, Francois Knoetze, Erin Ko & Jamie Martinez, 7 February to 14 April 2019
- Pendoran Vinci. Art and Artificial Intelligence Today, NRW Forum Düsseldorf (DE), curated with Peggy Schoenegge, with: Nora Al-Badri & Jan Nikolai Nelles, Jonas Blume, Justine Emard, Carla Gannis, Sofian Audry and Erin Gee (artist), Liat Grayver, Faith Holland, Tuomas A. Laitinen, and William Latham, 9 June to 19 August 2018
- Deep Water Cultures, Goethe-Institut Montreal (CAN), with: Jonas Blume, Marte Kiessling, Anuk Miladinovic, 23 November 2017 to 24 February 2018
- Reset III and Virtual Reality, Galerie Priska Pasquer, Cologne (DE), with: Gazira Babeli, Friedemann Banz & Giulia Bowinkel, Dominik Halmer, Carla Mercedes Hihn, Claudia Larcher, Patrick Lichty, Judith Sönnicken, The Swan Collective, Tamiko Thiel, Fiona Valentine Thomann & Alfredo Salazar-Caro's and William Robertson's Digital Museum of Digital Art with the exhibition Morphé Presence curated by Helena Acosta and Eileen Isagon Skyers with works by Rosa Menkman, Brenna Murphy, Theo Triantafyllidis, Miyö Van Stenis, 9 September to 28 October 2017
- Uncanny Conditions – A Virtual Reality Exhibition, whiteBox Munich (DE), for FNY Festival, curated with Peggy Schoenegge, with: Salome Asega & Reese Donohue & Tongkwai Lulin, Geoffrey Lillemon, Martina Menegon, Jakob Kudsk Steensen, 1 to 10 September 2017
- The Unframed World. Virtual Reality as artistic medium for the 21st century, HeK – House of Electronic Arts Basel (CH), with: Li Alin, Friedemann Banz & Giulia Bowinkel, Fragment.In, Martha Hipley, Rindon Johnson, Marc Lee, Mélodie Mousset & Naëm Baron, Rachel Rossin, Alfredo Salazar-Caro, 18 January to 5 March 2017
- Layered Landscapes, Galerie Philine Cremer, Düsseldorf (DE) with: Daecheon Lee, Mark Dorf, Alexandra Gorczynski, Joe Hamilton, Han Bing, Michelle Jezierski, 2 September to 21 October 2016
- Sometimes You See Your City Differently, Feinberg Projects, Tel Aviv (IL), with: Diana Artus, Hirohito Nomoto, Pola Sieverding, Eli Singalovski, 26 May to 9 July 2016
- When the Cat's Away, Abstraction, Anna Jill Lüpertz Gallery, Berlin (DE) with: Juliette Bonneviot, Manuel Fernandéz, Philip Hausmeier, Vince McKelvie, Cecilia Salama, 22 April to 4 June 2016
- Share Your Teeth (With the Ones You Love), Art von Frei, Berlin (DE), solo show of Aviv Benn, Germany, Opening: 17 March to 24 April 2016
- Between Her Own Viewpoint and Authentic Reality. The Photographic Oeuvre of Hildegard Ochse, Kommunale Galerie Berlin (DE), 5 November 2015 to 14 February 2016
- Porn to Pizza – Domestic Clichés, DAM Gallery, Berlin (DE), with: Anthony Antonellis, Kim Asendorf and Ole Fach, Domenico Barra, Petra Cortright, Kate Durbin, Carla Gannis, Laurence Gartel, Emilie Gervais, Claudia Hart, Paul Hertz, Faith Holland, Lindsay Lawson, Jessica Lichtenstein, Patrick Lichty, Mark Napier, Eva Papamargariti, Angelo Plessas, Hayley Aviva Silverman, Cornelia Sollfrank, Jonny Star, 5 September to 24 October 2015
- SALOON, Sexauer Gallery, Berlin (DE), with: Nina Ansari, Katharina Arndt, Diana Artus, Alexandra Baumgartner, Nadine Fecht, Ornella Fieres, Eliana Heredia, Julia Herfurth, Carla Mercedes Hihn, Michelle Jezierski, Ce Jian, Caroline Kryzecki, Ines Lechleitner, Maren Maiwald, Zoë Claire Miller, Maria Muñoz, Jennifer Oellerich, Hannah Parr, Sophia Pompéry, Ria Patricia Röder, Ina Sangenstedt, Gunna Schmidt, Lisa Tiemann, Anna Tsianou, Claudia Zweifel, 30 April to 22 May 2015
- Dark Sides of..., TS art projects, Berlin (DE), with: Sabine Banovic, Olivia Berckemeyer, Nicolai Huch, Clement Page, Yehudit Sasportas, 27 February to 18 April 2015
- Across the Lines – Jennifer Oellerich and Prajakta Potnis, INSITU, Berlin (DE), 23 October to 29 November 2014
- Divided and Reunified, Works from Haupt Collection, Images, Budapest, 10/2014
- Money Works Part 2, Haus am Lützowplatz (Studiogalerie), Berlin (DE), with:Katharina Arndt, Alexandra Baumgartner, Jennifer Chan, César Escudero Andaluz, Nadine Fecht, Manuel Gras, Maarten Janssen, Ralf Kopp, Alicja Kwade, Erica Lapadat-Janzen, Lorna Mills and Yoshi Sodeoka, Virginie Mossé, Maximilian Roganov, Sebastian Siechold, Philipp Valenta and Vadim Zakharov, 30 August to 12 October 2014
- Visual Noise – Diana Artus and Ornella Fieres, Lage Egal – Raum für aktuelle Kunst, Berlin (DE), 27 February to 21 March 2014
- Money Works | Kunst Mit Geld, group show, curated with Nicole Loeser, Berlin, 11/2013
- Entering Space, group exhibition, Berlin, 10/2013
- Non-Stop Infinity curated with Maja Block and Mike Ruiz, Munich / Berlin, 09 – 10/2011, with: Lance Wakeling, Lindsay Lawson, Niko Princen, Rafaël Rozendaal, Spiros Hadjidjanos und Swyndle & Hawks
- Identity Reset? Photo reportage from the Balkans to Afghanistancurated with Maja Block, Munich, 09 – 10/2010, with: Adina Huber, Florian Generotzky and Mika Schmidt,

== Online exhibitions ==
- Mermaids & Unicorns, peer to space online exhibition, 2017
- Our Cities Surrounded, peer to space online exhibition, 2016
- Cat Heroicus Sublimis, peer to space online exhibition, 2016
- Nargifsus, peer to space online exhibition, 2016

=== Publications (selected) ===
- Interview – A Conversation with Tina Sauerlaender and Peggy Schoenegge, in: Kunstmuseum Stuttgart: Mixed Realities, Ausst. Kat., Stuttgart, 2018
- The Unframed World. Virtual Reality as Artistic Medium, catalog text, 2017
- Aviv Benn, In the Land of No Emotions, exhibition catalog text, 2017
- In Labyrinthine Gardens — The Work of Gregor Hildebrandt, Almine Rech Gallery, Paris, 2017
- Ditte Ejlerskov – The Bajan Letters, catalog text, EN, 2016
- Gregor Hildebrandt – Bilder malen wie Cure, Galerie Perrotin, Seoul, EN/KOR, 2016
- Annabelle Craven-Jones – Conditions for neurotransmission [P.O.V.], Cruise & Callas, Berlin, 2016
- Gregor Hildebrandt – Die Anwesenheit des Abwesenden, Kritisches Lexikon der Gegenwartskunst, Ausg. 113/2, DE, 2016
- Tanja Selzer – Assoziative Brüche der Wirklichkeit, 2016
- Ornella Fieres, catalog text, SEXAUER gallery, Berlin, Germany, 2015
- Jonny Star – Wachen Sein Tod, Berlin, Germany, 2015
- Rolf-Gunter Dienst – Verlebendigung und Differenzierung von Farbe, catalog, DIEHL Galerie, Berlin, Germany, 2015
- Taryn Simon – Archive des Unsichtbaren, Kritisches Lexikon der Gegenwartskunst, Ausg. 109/7, DE, 2015
- Katharina Arndt, The Exposed Self. On 16 Tattoos, in: DNCHT Magazine for Photography, Design and Subculture, #17, 2015
- Caroline Kryzecki – Chaos around superposition, catalog, SEXAUER gallery, Berlin, Germany, 2014
- Alicja Kwade – Die Konstruktion der Wirklichkeit, Kritisches Lexikon der Gegenwartskunst, Ausg. 107/19, 2014
- Anselm Reyle – Pop Abstraktion, Kritisches Lexikon der Gegenwartskunst, Ausg. 106/12, 2014
- Carsten Nicolai – Das Potenzial des Prozesshaften, Kritisches Lexikon der Gegenwartskunst, Ausg. 104/ 25, 2013
- Sammlung Haupt / Haupt collection, collection catalog, co-editor and author, Edition Braus, Berlin, Germany, 2013
