= Nicole Killian =

American new media artist

- Born: Nicole Marie Killian; September 16, 1982 (age 44); Buffalo, New York, U.S.

Nicole Marie Killian is a new media artist and design educator based in New Haven, Connecticut.

== Personal life and education ==
Killian was born on September 16, 1982, in Buffalo, New York, and was raised in a Sicilian-American Catholic family. They earned their M.F.A from Cranbrook Academy of Art in 2011 and their B.F.A from Rochester Institute of Technology in 2004. Their undergraduate studies were completed in Dessau Germany at the Bauhaus.Their background is in graphic design and is known for digital GIFs, publishing, and writing that deals with queerness, girlhood and popular culture. In 2026, they joined the faculty at the Yale University as Assistant Professor and Assistant Director of Graduate Studies in Graphic Design. Previously, they taught at Virginia Commonwealth University and Minneapolis College of Art and Design.

== Career ==
=== Exhibitions ===
Killian's first solo show JELLY was at Sadie Halie Projects in Brooklyn New York in 2013.

In 2014, Killian also showed at Present Works in Milwaukee Wisconsin, in an exhibition called Mood Ring, which happened in tandem with a day-long residency for Designers Talking that was exhibited at Comb Gallery and ended with an artist talk.

Killian held a residency at Arteles in Haukijärvi Finland during the Neo-Future gathering in 2016. In 2016, they had a solo show at Richmond's SEDIMENT titled My Friend's Cat is Cute.

=== Other works ===
Killian ran a four year long collaborative studio practice in Brooklyn, New York called Hot Sundae focused on queer ideals of breaking rules and having fun.

Killian collaborated with artist Charlie White in 2012 on his Music For Sleeping Children project. Killian created a back door net space that has remained an ongoing archive for them.

In 2014, Lorna Mills curated a video series, entitled Ways of Something, based on art historian John Berger's 1971 documentary Ways of Seeing. For this, thirty different web-based artists were invited per episode to create a single minute of footage about their contemporary practice. Ways of Something has included work by several key participants in the net.art and New Media fields featuring Killian, along with LaTurbo Avedon, Jeremy Bailey, Jacob Ciocci, Faith Holland, Rollin Leonard, Rosa Menkman, Sara Ludy, Alfredo Salazar-Caro, Carla Gannis, Jennifer Chan, Anthony Antonellis, Claudia Hart, Angela Washko, and Chiara Passa among others.

In 2016, Killian collaborated with artist A.L. Steiner on a web-based book titled "Deep Inside My In/Box" which has since been taken offline but was an ever-shifting archive of images and writing shared between the two over social media, texts and emails.

Killian often works with collections of images that are mined off the internet. Killian was commissioned by Electric Objects to create "my5t1c m3d1t4t10nz," a series of 5 looping video pieces that launched in the summer of 2016. The project explored the relationship with smartphones, considering how they are transformed into altars for focus and imbue the machines with spiritual meaning.

==== Book fair involvement ====
Since 2014 Killian has been active in the art book world and collaborates with artist Sarah Faith Gottesdiener on a publication titled ISSUES that focuses on work from artists, writers and designers with a feminist/queer/POC perspective. At the 2017 Los Angeles Art Book Fair Paper Magazine noted Killian as one of the "6 Feminist Artists and Zine Makers to Know."

They have also collaborated with Savannah Knoop and frequently writes for art journal WOW HUH where they have discussed the comparisons between Carly Rae Jepsen and Kurt Cobain and interviewed LaTurbo Avedon. Their essay The Transgressive Girl was published by The Journal of Feminist Scholarship.

In March 2018, Killian participated in Fully Booked in Dubai, and spoke on the panel entitled Why do we make what we make?

==== Queering Design Pedagogy/Pedagogy as Praxis ====
Killian was recently invited by the Walker Art Center to guest edit a piece for Soundboard titled How Can We Queer Graphic Design Education Without Compromise? The piece included work by Ramon Tejada, Kristina Ketola Bore, Nate Pyper and Ginger Brooks Takahashi. This was published in July 2018. In September 2018 Killian was included in queer.archive.work, a new project by Paul Soulellis. Their piece "A SCENE AT THE SEA BUS STOP SONG" was performed at MoMA PS1 during the New York Art Book Fair for Publishing as Practice as Resistance by Paul Soulellis along with work by Jack Halberstam, Nate Pyper, Sal Randolph and Nora Kahn. In tandem with this performance, Killian sat on a panel titled Queer Publishing as Community Practice with Be Oakley of Genderfail Press and Caroline Paquita of Pegacorn Press. This was organized by Sara Hamerman for the Contemporary Artists' Books Conference. The panel was featured in a Hyperallergic piece titled A Preview of Printed Matter’s Annual NY Art Book Fair, Featuring 73 First-Time Exhibitors

In January 2019, Killian was published by the AIGA's Eye on Design in a dialogue with Meg Miller titled "What Does Queering Design Education Actually Look Like in Practice?" In this interview Killian discussed how they question the space of a classroom to reconsider what design education looks like. They offered some insight into their pedagogical methods, from showcasing queer artists and artists of color, to creating new conversations amongst students. They have given talks at both Central Saint Martins in London and Konstfack in Stockholm on the topics of generosity as a form of queering in design practice and pedagogy. The lecture was titled Queering as Praxis
