= Kelani Nichole =

Contemporary art curator in the United States

- Occupations: Curator, gallery founder and director
- Known for: Founder of TRANSFER Gallery

Kelani Nichole is a technologist and curator of time-based media and digital art active in the United States and abroad. She is the founding director of Transfer Gallery. Nichole has organized online exhibitions and public programs and in venues in cities like Brooklyn, San Francisco, Los Angeles, Miami, and Mexico City, among others.

== Education ==
Nichole earned a bachelor's degree in art history in 2010 and right after joined Little Berlin, a curatorial collective based in Philadelphia, Pennsylvania. In 2012, the article “The Digital Divide” by author and art theorist Claire Bishop published in Artforum magazine sparked a further investigation into the digital arts and its developments, which eventually led her to found and direct TRANSFER Gallery in 2013.

== Career and curatorial projects ==
In 2019, she curated the group show Reconfiguring Binaries at Pioneer Works in Brooklyn. The exhibition commented on the relation between contemporary art and technology culture through computer-generated image-making, artificial intelligence, and augmented realities. It featured artists Tabita Rezaire, Morehshin Allahyari, LaTurbo Avedon, Meriem Bennani, Snow Yunxue Fu, Claudia Hart, Faith Holland, Lorna Mills, Eva Papamargariti, and Lu Yang. According to the institution's website, the exhibition was supported by the New York State Council on the Arts.

In a recent interview, the curator discussed the term digital arts

"The biggest misconception with ‘digital art’ is that it’s any different than other means of contemporary artmaking. I’m keen to stop using the word ‘digital’ to talk about these practices. One of the biggest challenges to the appreciation of these emerging formats is our lack of vocabulary to discuss these practices and their implications on the institutions of the artworld. The practices I support are contemporary art practices that have a fundamentally computer-based process – the works that come from the studios are an even split of moving images/software pieces and physical objects."

In 2022, she curated the first virtual exhibition in the history of the Pérez Art Museum Miami. The piece wwwunderkammer, a commissioned augmented reality work by artist Carla Gannis about world-building and alternate realities, was on display between 2022 and 2023. The show was later exhibited at Halsey Institute Galleries and Hill Exhibition Gallery, part of College of Charleston, South Carolina.

Nichole and her Transfer Gallery have been featured in publications including Artforum, the New York Times, and ARTnews. She helped artists to place works with prominent media art collections including the Whitney Museum of American Art and the Thoma Foundation.

== Transfer Gallery ==
Nichole founded Transfer Gallery, an independent exhibition space for the digital arts inhabiting a Brooklyn warehouse in 2013. The gallery, now based online, has been exhibiting international artists working on time-based media, virtual reality, GIFs, internet art, and NFTs, among other innovative media for over a decade.

She established TRANSFER Download, an international curatorial series first presented in Los Angeles, in 2016. In 2019, Nichole relocated to California and opened TRANSFER's second address there. The Los Angeles iteration was more focused on public programs and community building.

Her curatorial work often engages with and foster the work of women artists working in installation, computer and film-based art. Her happening series ‘gURLs’ at TRANSFER in 2013 oriented a two-year exhibition program between 2016 and 2018. The project featured 4K video works of self portraiture, video art installations, video game piece, and digital fabrications by Carla Gannis, Claudia Hart, Angela Washko, and Morehshin Allahyari, respectively.

Nichole produced the video art and digital art exhibition Well Now WTF? in 2020 with more than 80 creatives hosted by the online platform Silicon Valet, a “parking lot for digital art.” Among the artists included were Faith Holland and Lorna Mills, and digital anthropologist Wade Wallerstein.

In 2023, Kelani Nichole was selected as the Oolite Arts’ first Digital Arts Fellow, in Miami. For her fellowship, the curator is overseeing the Oolite's new Media Art Lab, working on a pilot project for the TRANSFER Archive, a collaborative preservation platform for digital arts on the blockchain as well as hosting office hours and the Oolite Arts' Media Art Salon Series with local artists interested in digital arts.

== Recognition ==
Nichole was named an ARTnews’ Innovator in 2020 and as one of Apollo Magazine’s 40 Under 40 Art & Tech Business Leaders in 2021.
