= Gray Area Foundation for the Arts =

American non-profit arts organization

- Formation: 2006
- Founder: Josette Melchor
- Type: 501(c)(3)
- Headquarters: San Francisco
- Executive Director: Barry Threw
- Website: www.grayarea.org

Gray Area Foundation for the Arts, Inc. is a 501(c)3 non-profit art organization which hosts media art festivals, exhibitions, music events, software and electronics classes, a media lab, and a resident artist program. It is the only institution in San Francisco dedicated to art and technology.

== History ==
=== Founding and nonprofit formation ===
Josette Melchor initially opened Gray Area Gallery in San Francisco's South of Market (SoMa) in 2006, following a conversation about the lack of proper venues for the exhibition of new media and technology-based art works. By 2008, the gallery had incorporated as a non-profit and was renamed the Gray Area Foundation for The Arts.

=== Tenderloin location ===
In 2009 Gray Area relocated to 55 Taylor Street, as an anchor tenant in a three block redevelopment project to create an arts district in San Francisco's Tenderloin. This 8,000-square-foot location originally included an adult theater, bar and liquor store and was transformed into a gallery space with artist studios, new-media lab, café and artists' boutique. The property owner Jack Sumski invested more than $1M for improvements in the building to prepare the site for Gray Area. The space allowed Gray Area to expand its exhibition platform to include artist residencies, educational workshops, and symposiums. In this location, Gray Area served as part of a coalition of city agencies, arts organizations and community service providers attempting to revitalize a neighborhood that historically struggled with the effects of substance abuse, addiction, and poverty.

=== Market Street location ===
Gray Area later moved to the Warfield Building at 923 Market Street, investing roughly $60,000 in renovations. They were ultimately forced to move due to competition for real estate in the mid-market neighborhood, following the city's payroll tax breaks incentivizing startups, restaurants and developers to move into the area.

=== Mission location ===
In 2014 Gray Area moved to their present location at the historic Grand Theater at 2665 Mission Street. The organization renovated the theater, converting it from a vacant retail space into a performance space and cultural incubator. In 2019 Josette Melchor transitioned her role from executive director to board member, and Barry Threw assumed the role of Executive and artistic director.

== Gray Area Festival ==
Launched in 2015, the Gray Area Festival is the first International media arts festival in San Francisco. It normally features an art exhibition, daily talks and evening performances.

After the #ReviveTheGrand campaign, the first Gray Area Festival took place in 2015. With initial presentations by Jane Metcalfe, Michael Naimark, Golan Levin, Camille Utterback and night events by Shigeto, Alessandro Cortini, and others.

In 2016, the 2nd year of the Gray Area Festival focused on a prompt by Buckminster Fuller and a holistic approach to the arts. The event had the Refraction Exhibition.

In 2017, the 3rd year of the Gray Area Festival focused on the challenges to the optimism of the future.

The Gray Area Festival returned in 2018 with a focus on Blockchain, Distributed Systems and Art as the main theme. The event opened with the Distributed Systems exhibition curated by Barry Threw. The next two days, July 27–28, they hosted daytime talks around the festival theme with night-time audiovisual performances.

The Gray Area Festival 2019 focused on experiences including augmented reality, virtual reality and XR. Curated by Barry Threw, the 2019 festival centered around the Experiential Space Research Lab, ISM Hexadrome and a robotic exoskeleton performance, Inferno.

The 2020 Gray Area Festival was held virtually through the coronavirus pandemic as the Gray Area Festival 2020 "Radical Simulation". Professor D. Fox Harrell from MIT and Ruha Benjamin keynoted the festival. The festival featured Anti-Gone by Theo Triantafyllidis, Amelia Winger-Bearskin, Phazero, LaTurbo Avedon, Lawrence Lek, Morehshin Allahyari and Stephanie Dinkins.

The 2021 edition of Gray Area Festival was titled "Worlding Protocol" and took place from October 20–26, 2021. The festival featured McKenzie Wark as a keynote speaker. The festival featured Audrey Tang, Benjamin Bratton, McKenzie Wark, and Wendy Chun. It also presented the work of A.M. Darke, Auriea Harvey, Cheyenne Concepcion, d0n.xyz, Heesoo Kwon, Huntrezz Janos, Jeremy Couillard, Joey Holder, Keiken, Kei Kreutler, LaJuné McMillian, Nathan Shafer, Peter Wu+, Qianqian Ye, Rodell Warner, Sammie Veeler, Skawennati, Sister Lady Bianca, Shu Lea Cheang, Tabita Rezaire, Thenmozhi Soundarajan, Tiare Ribeaux, Valencia James, and Vernelle Noel. The 2021 exhibition was curated by Wade Wallerstein and placed in New Art City.

The Gray Area Festival 2022 took place September 24 – October 2, 2022. The event was titled Distant Early Warnings and used Marshall McLuhan concepts. The festival featured performances by clipping, DeForrest Brown, Delta-T (Matthew Biederman & Pierce Warnecke), Evicshen, Fraction, Haleek Maul, IQ, YACHT and Zo. Speakers at the festival included Alex Kitnick, Alice Yuan Zhang, Andrew McLuhan, Caroline Sinders, Catherine Stihler, Chiara Di Leone, DeForrest Brown, Hans Ulrich Obrist, Huntrezz, Paige Emery, Paola Antonelli, Sam Lavigne, Şerife Wong, Tega Brain, and Timothy Morton.

The Gray Area Festival 2023 was themed "Plural Prototypes" and happened October 19–22, 2025. Participanats in the festival included Allison Duettmann, Arden Schager, Ari Kalinowski (Delta_Ark), Asma Kazmi, Cade Diehm, Cheng Xu, Claudia Alick, Don Hanson, Federico Pérez Villoro, Fred von Lohmann, Indira Allegra, Jill Miller, Kaitlin Donovan, Kat Walsh, Kate Stevenson, Kelani Nichole, Kurt Opsahl, Lee Tzu-Tung 李紫彤, Leigh Tanner, Lindsey Felt, mai ishikawa sutton, Matt Prewitt, Melissa Malzkuhn, Nat Decker, Octavia Rose Hingle, Raphael Arar, Renee Dumaresque, Roxi Shohadaee, Sammie Veeler, Serena Treppiedi, Stefana Fratila, Taeyoon Choi, and Vanessa Chang.

The 10th annual Gray Area Festival was simply called "Gray Area Festival 10" and took place in 2024 with Lynn Hershman Leeson, Tanya Zimbardo, Rashaad Newsome, Casey Reas, Trevor Paglen, Mindy Seu, John Maeda, Golan Levin, Barbara London, Morehshin Allahyari, Ceci Moss, Ranu Mukherjee, Eryk Salvaggio, Victoria Ivanova, Jay Mollica, Sharmi Basu, Wendi Yan, Chia Amisola, Michael Connor, Alice Scope, and Yvonne Fang.

The Gray Area Festival 2025 is to take place from September 11 until September 14, 2025. The annual festival features Alice Bucknell, Arvida Byström, Ash Fure, Authentically Plastic, Briana Marela Lizárraga, Christina Agapakis, Connor Cook, Cynthia Ling Lee, Dalena Tran, Darren Zhu, Debit, Fitnesss, Hirad Sab, Kevin Peter He, Leia Chang, M. Ty, Martina Menegon, micha cárdenas, Miguel Novelo, Miriam Simun, Onyx Ashanti, Salomé Chatriot, Shane Denson, Star Amerasu, Stelarc, Stephanie Zhang, Sydney Skybetter, Toby Shorin, Xiaowei R. Wang, Xin Liu, and Zach Blas. The 2025 edition of the festival is notable for having its United States National Endowment for the Arts funding cut.

== Programs ==
=== Education ===
Gray Area hosts an ongoing series workshops and classes covering topics such as creative coding, decentralization of data, and foundation skills for producing technology driven artworks.

=== Art exhibitions ===
Gray Area has hosted several notable art exhibitions. In 2016 they mounted DeepDream: The Art of Neural Networks, representing the first exhibition of art created by Generative Adversarial Networks, a form of artificial intelligence. In 2018 they launched Distributed Systems, featuring NFT and blockchain art, preceding the historic sales and public interest in the technology of 2021. In 2023 they hosted TECHS-MECHS, a solo show by celebrated Mexican-Canadian new media artist Rafael Lozano-Hemmer. Located within the predominantly Latino Mission district, the exhibition challenged the stereotype of "Mexican Art" by paying homage to Mexico's lesser known tradition of experimentation within technology and culture.

=== Artist residency ===
The first five resident artists (Alphonzo Solorzano, Gabriel Dunne, Ryan Alexander, Miles Stemper and Daniel Massey) moved into the space in July 2009. In 2010, three of these resident artists remained (Gabriel Dunne, Ryan Alexander and Daniel Massey).

=== Gray Area Incubator ===
The Gray Area Incubator is a membership program run by Gray Area for creators developing work in art and technology. The membership lasted for six months. Artists work in the disciplines of Visual Media Arts, Creative Code, Virtual & Augmented Reality, Civic Engagement & Digital Activism, Social Entrepreneurship, Data Science, Sound & Audio, and Software & Hardware.

=== Partnerships and projects ===
Gray Area Foundation for The Arts has partnered with the MIT Senseable City Lab to produce a multi-faceted series of community initiatives and symposiums called Senseable Cities Speaker Series.

City Centered Festival brought together artists, educators and community leaders within the Tenderloin district using 'locative media'.

Syzygryd is a collaboration with three other arts organizations (Interpretive Arson, False Profit Labs and Ardent Heavy Industries) to create a large scale interactive art piece to be unveiled at the 2010 Burning Man event.

Gray Area partnered with Gaian Systems to produce the Experiential Space Research Lab (2019–2020), with support from the John S. and James L. Knight Foundation. The selected twelve artists (Bz Zhang, Celeste Martore, Jonathon Keats, Kelly Skye, Kevin Bernard Moultrie Daye, Orestis Herodotou, Rena Tom, Romie Littrell, Stephanie Andrews, Stephen Standridge, Yulia Pinkusevich) co-created a 2020 exhibition titled The End of You.

The annual Recombinant Festival is held by Recombinant Media Labs (RML) at the Grand Theater since 2016 in partnership with Gray Area, as a multi day event dedicated to audiovisual performances and spatial experimentation. The partnership between Recombinant Media Labs and Gray Area dates back to 2009 when the then Tenderloin gallery space became the official home of RML.

== Media coverage ==
Gray Area's Josette Melchor was selected as one of the five innovators showcased on Ford's The Edge of Progress Tour.

After the 2016 Oakland "Ghostship" warehouse fire, Gray Area raised approximately $1.3 million from over 12,000 donors which it distributed to 390 applicants, ranging from deceased victims' next of kin, displaced residents, people injured in the fire, as well as chosen family within marginalized communities.
