= Jonny Star =

German artist

- Born: December 26, 1964 (age 61); Düsseldorf, West Germany
- Education: German

Jonny Star (born December 26, 1964, in Düsseldorf, Germany) is a German artist. Until 2011 she worked as an artist under her given name Gabriele-Maria Scheda. She lives and works in Berlin and in New York City, United States

== Personal life ==
Jonny Star spent her first ten years in Düsseldorf and the surrounding area before moving to the Hochsauerland region (North Rhine-Westphalia) with her parents and two sisters. There her parents opened an alternative hotel which became the vacation destination of the Düsseldorf art and theater scene in the 1970s. Jonny Star's mother belonged to the scene as part of the circle of the American theatre director and theatre manager Ernest Martin from the late 1960s on. In 1982 Jonny Star left her home and became part of the West Berlin subculture. In 1990 she passed her A-levels in an all women's class at the School for Adult Education (Schule für Erwachsenenbildung) in Berlin and studied Psychology at the TU Berlin from 1991 until 1996. From 1985 to 1992, Jonny Star co-operated the legendary cult bar Café Anfall in Berlin-Kreuzberg and had extended stays abroad in France, Spain, Portugal, the US, Mexico, Guatemala, Honduras, Nicaragua, Costa Rica, Morocco, Algeria, Mali, Burkina Faso and Niger before starting to work professionally as a visual artist in 1996. From 1997 to 1999, she learned Mold making and the process of bronze casting in the prestigious Berlin based fine art foundry Bildgießerei Hermann Noack. In the years 1999 to 2005, followed numerous stays in Portugal. In addition to her artistic work, she initiated and curated international exhibitions and art projects like Showroom Berlin (1996–1998), JONNY'S (2007–2009), SWEET HOME (2011–2012) and SUPERUSCHI (since 2013). Since 1996 Jonny Star has exhibited internationally.

== Artistic work ==
In her artistic work, Jonny Star uses various materials and media which she often combines, such as bronze, photography, fabric and installation elements. Star usually creates series of works that develop over several years in parallel. In early bronze sculptures like the series Dear Germaine (1998) or and suddenly (1998–99) she creates humanlike imaginary creatures that deal with the counterpoints of heaviness and lightness, movement and stagnation and with themes like imprisonment, exposure or suffering. In the bronzes of the series alle zusammen (2001), suchen eine reise (2003), and wachen sein tot (2009–10) the artist additionally uses found objects from nature. In some work series, such as JETZT KOMM ICH (2007) or in the soft objects, cushion-like objects for the wall like My Flowerself (2010), Jonny is Back (2011) or komm ruh' dich aus (2012), Jonny Star deals with her own biography embedded in a private everyday aesthetics. With the change of her name from Gabriele-Maria Scheda to Jonny Star in 2011, occur more frequently topics like sexuality, physicality, identity, gender roles and their social reception. In Sex Sells (2013), Toy Girls (2014), Toy Boys (2014) or Free Your Soul (2015) Star accesses heterosexual and homosexual Internet pornography. She transfers video stills that she photographs from the screen or photos from pornographic magazines on fabric and collages them on doilies, or on self-made fabric objects and tapestries to reveal discriminatory gender clichés or sexual taboos that exist in our society. Many of her works of art criticize the structures of the global art market that should be

forward thinking and unconventional, but represent one of the most strikingly conservative patriarchal structures.

— Jonny Star in SLEEK Interview with Tina Sauerländer, February 2015

== Curated exhibition series ==
Jonny Star develops group exhibitions in private homes, such as her own, or in gallery and project spaces, where Star creates spatial interventions to imitate the intimacy of private spaces. Star's main interest is to form of a participatory community of artists and visitors of the exhibition, as well as creating a greater awareness of the necessity of art in everyday life. She sees herself not necessarily as a curator, but rather as someone who brings

people together for a collective experience.

— Jonny Star in EXBERLINER interview Fridey Mickel, June 2014

The exhibitions are not profit-oriented and were supported by the Berlin Senate Chancellery for Cultural Affairs among others or financed through crowdfunding campaigns.

=== Jonny's (2007–2009) ===
Ostensibly, Jonny Star's arts project Jonny's is a Portuguese shop (later with Café) in a part of the artist's ground-floor apartment in Berlin-Kreuzberg. Most of the delicacies sold there were obtained directly from the manufacturers in Portugal and had an unusual, anachronistic packaging design. In fact, Jonny's was an expansive art installation, also hosting exhibitions of different artists. On the shelves, between the food and household goods, bronze sculptures, collages and paintings were shown. Life and art were considered equal here. Exhibition openings, performance evenings, readings and artist talks were held regularly.

=== Sweet Home (2011–2013) ===
In March 2011, Jonny Star developed the exhibition project Sweet Home out of the preceding project Jonny's. The shows also took place at Star's apartment. International artists were invited to exhibit their work in a solo exhibition in Star's staged, exuberant living room. During the openings and events, Jonny Star installed a Portuguese bar with food and drinks. In December 2011, Sweet Home was invited to exhibit at the art fair SCOPE Art Show Miami 2011.

=== Superuschi (since 2013) ===
The exhibition series Superuschi (since March 2013) emerged from Star's projects Sweet Home (2011–2013) and Jonny's (2007–2009). International visual or performance artists participate and reflect together with Jonny Star a particular theme. The result is an exhibition that facilitates the interaction between space, objects, artists and guests, in terms of a Social sculpture. The artists have the opportunity to network with each other and the visitors attain a more direct participation in visual and performing arts. The Superuschi exhibition kitchen girls & toy boys in the Rush Arts Gallery in New York City in 2015 was supported by the Berlin Senate Cultural Affairs Department.

== Publications ==
- JONNY STAR NEWSPAPER 2012
- JONNY STAR NEWSPAPER 2013
- Jonny is Back, 2011, Photography / Layout by Jonny Star, Text by Bianca Döring
- Where's Jonny, 2011, Photography / Layout by Jonny Star, Text by Bianca Döring
- Jonny and the Bio-Doctor, 2011, Photography / Layout by Jonny Star, Text by Bianca Döring
- Heuchelmund, Karen-Susan Fessel, short stories with photographs by Gabriele-Maria Scheda (Jonny Star), Konkursbuchverlag Claudia Gehrke, Tübingen, Germany, 1995
- Jonny Star. See Me, Feel Me, Touch Me, Heal Me, mit Textbeiträgen von Eva Meyer-Hermann, Tina Sauerlaender, Ralf Hanselle, Distanz Verlag, Berlin 2016

== Scholarships and awards ==
- 2016 Ruth Katzman Stipend, The League Residency At Vyt, New York
- 2014 Travel Grant Cultural Exchange of the Berlin Senate Cultural Affairs Department, supported group show in NYC curated by Jonny Star (SUPERUSCHI)

== Exhibitions ==
=== Solo exhibitions (selection) ===
- 2017 The Cycle Room, Atelierhof Kreuzberg, Berlin, Germany
- 2017 The Undone Ritual, 266 chashama, New York City, USA
- 2017 Fire, Botschaft at Uferhallen, Berlin, Germany
- 2016 See Me, Feel Me, Touch Me, Heal Me, Kosmetiksalo Bar Babette, Berlin, Germany
- 2015 MY WAY, Kreuzberg Pavilion, Berlin, Germany
- 2014 INTERGALAKTISCH, ROMPONE artspace, Cologne, Germany
- 2014 le puff, Tatau Obscur, Berlin, Germany
- 2013 Sex Sells, The Tornado and THE ONE, San Francisco, USA
- 2012 good for you, Klötze und Schinken, Berlin, Germany
- 2010 my flowerself, Crystal Ball Gallery, Berlin, Germany
- 2010 JETZT KOMM ICH, Haus am Lützowplatz / Studiogalerie, Berlin, Germany
- 2006 lang lang, Galeria Abraço, Lisbon, Portugal
- 2004 suchen eine reise, Porca Preta Gallery, Monchique, Portugal
- 2002 alle zusammen, Pasteur im Milchhof, Berlin, Germany
- 2002 DU LIEBE, Pasteur im Milchhof, Berlin, Germany
- 2001 alle zusammen, Centro Cultural, Vila do Bispo, Portugal
- 2000 werde fliegen, Gallery Foro, Loulé, Portugal
- 1999 and suddenly, schrotter & engel, Berlin, Germany
- 1996 Weltstadt Berlin, schrotter & engel, Berlin, Germany

=== Participation in group exhibitions (selection) ===
- 2021 entFALTUNG curated by Carolyn Heinz and Franziska Storch (SALOON Hamburg), Galerie Carolyn Heinz, Hamburg, Germany
- 2021 PERSPECTIVES - Tomorrow is the question, curated by Madeleine Schwinge, re:future Lab, Berlin, Germany
- 2020 Support, Walden Kunstausstellungen, Berlin, Germany
- 2020 Fifty/Fifty. The Matter Of Duality, curated by Grigori Dor and Mascha Naumova, Paul Fleischmann Haus, Berlin, Germany
- 2020 How beautiful you are! curated by Maik Schierloh, KINDL – Centre for Contemporary Art, Berlin, Germany
- 2019 Künstlergeld aus der Sammlung Haupt, Verband Deutscher Bürgschaftsbanken, Berlin, Germany
- 2018 Carpets, Katharina Maria Raab Gallery, Belin, Germany
- 2018 Wonder Woman ART b!tch curated by Britta (Helbig) Adler, Kosmetiksalon Babett, Berlin, Germany
- 2018 Geld - Wahn - Sinn, Haupt Collection at Reinbeckhallen curated by Lena Fließbach, Reinbeckhallen Berlin, Germany
- 2018 NGORONGORO II, Artistweekend Berlin at Jonas Burgert, Berlin, Germany
- 2018 Ein Turm von Unmöglichkeiten, (Salon Hansa), Galerie König, Berlin, Germany
- 2017 Female Ejaculation, curated by Jonny Star, Kosmetiksalon Babette, Berlin, Germany
- 2017 Mein lieber Freund und Kupferstecher, Haupt Collection, Verband Deutscher Bürgschaftsbanken, Berlin, Germany
- 2017 BERLIN-KLONDYKE 2017, UGM Studio, Maribor, Slovenija
- 2016 Der Flug der Königinnen. Women at work., ROMPONE artspace, Cologne, Germany
- 2016 Erste Botschaft: frohe Botschaft, Botschaft in den Uferhallen, Berlin, Germany
- 2015 You Can Feel It, Haus am Lützowplatz / Studiogalerie, Berlin, Germany
- 2015 PORN TO PIZZA—Domestic Clichés, curated by Tina Sauerländer, DAM Gallery, Berlin, Germany
- 2015 CE QUI JE SUIS MAINTENANT – Ein Zimmer für Alfred Flechtheim, curated by Claudia Cosmo, Osthaus Museum Hagen, Germany
- 2015 4 Years and Counting!, Juror selection of Omar Lopez Chahoud, Noospere Arts, New York City
- 2015 kitchen girls & toy boys, Rush Arts Gallery, New York City, USA
- 2014 viel ARBEIT_wenig Rot, Salon Hansa, rosa lux, Berlin, Germany
- 2014 CE QUI JE SUIS MAINTENANT – Ein Zimmer für Alfred Flechtheim, curated by Claudia Cosmo, ROMPONE artspace, Cologne, Germany
- 2014 aussen hui, innen pfui with Elke Graalfs, MONTAGEHALLE, Berlin, Germany
- 2014 My Paper Sunglasses, curated by Otavio Santiago, Somos Art House, Berlin, Germany
- 2014 head / body, curated by CHAMBER OF FINE ARTS, souterrain, Zurich, Switzerland
- 2013 Kunst und Banausen, curated by Elke Graalfs, Walden Gallery, Berlin, Germany
- 2012 Warhol is over, Robert Fontaine Gallery, Miami, USA
- 2010 Topsy Freerider! Le Trans Tier Salon, Crystal Ball Gallery, Berlin, Germany
- 2002 Mitten ins Herz, Gallery Tammen & Busch, Berlin, Germany

== Works in private collections ==
- Heilhausstiftung Ursa Paul, Kassel, Germany
- Sparkasse Hochsauerland, Germany
- Haupt Collection, Berlin, Germany
