= Sieverding =

Sieverding is a surname. Notable people with the surname include:

- Katharina Sieverding (born 1941), German photographer
- Pola Sieverding (born 1981), photographer and video artist
