= Grand Theater, San Francisco =

Historic theater

Grand Theater
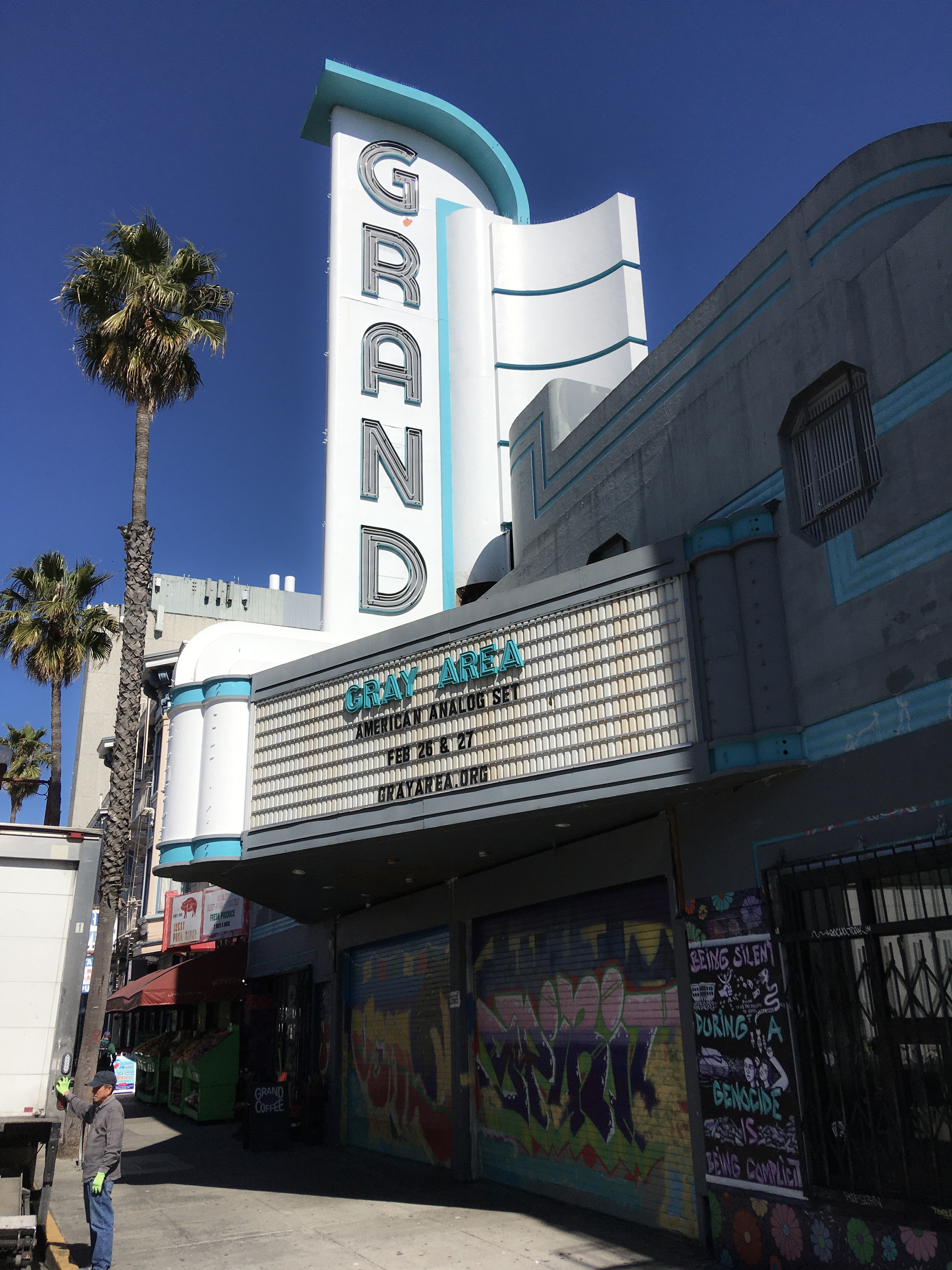
- Interactive map of the Grand Theater area

General information
- Location: 2665 Mission Street, San Francisco, United States of America
- Coordinates: 37.7544°N 122.4184°W
- Current tenants: Gray Area Foundation for the Arts
- Opened: March 23, 1940

Technical details
- Floor area: 9,186 square feet

Design and construction
- Architects: G. Albert Lansburgh and S. Charles Lee

The Grand Theater is a historic theater in the Mission District of San Francisco, California. The venue became San Francisco Historic Landmark #315 in March 2024. Located at 2665 Mission Street, it was built in 1940 in the Streamline Moderne style with notable neon sign and marquee.

== History ==
The Grand Theater originally opened on March 23 1940 as a single-screen neighborhood movie theater. It was designed by architects G. Albert Lansburgh and S. Charles Lee to be operated by prominent theater owner D.B. Levin. As the last movie theater built in San Francisco before World War II, it offered late night shows at low prices appealing to budget conscious families. When it opened it was part of the "Mission Miracle Mile", a theater district featuring nickelodeons, Vaudeville houses and movie palaces.

In 1988 the Grand Theater closed and was converted in 1990 into two retail spaces. In 2009 it was converted into a single large retail space, occupied by a Chinese import store in 2005 and then by a dollar store.

=== Restoration and current use ===
Starting in 2014 the building underwent renovation to become a "Technology and Art Theater" by its current tenant, Gray Area Foundation for the Arts, a digital arts nonprofit organization. The organization spent $200,000 on repairs and raised an additional $300,000 through crowd funding. The work was completed in 2015 in advance of the first Gray Area Festival which was held in the space.

The renovation included removing the fluorescent lighting used by the former retail tenant, adding carpeted floors, the construction of a two-story interior addition of studio spaces and the removal of demising walls which exposed the decorative details of the interior theater. The restoration focused on creating a new space for digital media, screen-based works and performances rather than recreating the traditional cinema experience.

In 2023 Gray Area restored the section of neon spelling GRAND on the façade of the building, marking the first time in over 30 years the sign had been lit up.
