= Jennifer Chan (artist) =

Canadian media artist, curator, and programmer

Jennifer Chan is a Canadian media artist, curator, and programmer based in Toronto, Ontario. She is known for work that addresses how gender and race manifest in the fields of digital and online art, using amateur aesthetics inspired by pop culture, YouTube mashups, and millennial experience.

== Early life and education ==
Chan was born in Canada, but grew up in Hong Kong before returning to Canada. She completed an Honours Bachelor of Arts (HBA) in Communication, Culture, Information and Technology at the University of Toronto Mississauga, graduating in 2010. She also earned a Diploma in Studio Art and Digital Communication from Sheridan College in 2010. She then attended Syracuse University, attaining a MFA in Art Video in 2013.

== Career ==
Chan's recent work focuses on the representation of masculinity and constructions of gender and race. She explores mediated tensions ranging from the mundane on one end of the spectrum, and provocation or controversy on the other, using video, object assemblage, websites, sound, and prints.

=== Notable works ===
Chan's 2011 essay Why Are There No Great Women Net Artists? (a play on Linda Nochlin's 1971 essay "Why Have There Been No Great Women Artists?") is an attempt to write women into the history of new media art.

Chan co-organized the online exhibition Body Anxiety with Leah Schrager, as a challenge to male-dominated digital and online art spaces.

In 2012, Chan was the "Canadian Spotlight" artist at Toronto's Images Festival where she exhibited a retrospective of single channel works, including her video "Screensaver" in which she eviscerates a pile of MacBooks with carving knives. Chan had a phone and email conversation with Canadian Art about six key lessons about challenging the internet. Her piece from the same year, "Young Money", which features white college boys surfing the internet and an anonymous man ejaculating on a pizza printed t-shirt.

In 2013, Chan was invited to contribute a sequence to The One Minutes (commissioned by the Sandberg Institute) as part of Ways of Something, a net artists' remake of John Berger's Ways Of Seeing compiled by Lorna Mills. The video has screened at the Institute of Contemporary Arts (London), Fabrica (UK), MenShing Museum (Beijing), in Wooloomooloo (Taipei), and SongEun Art Space (South Korea), and was subsequently collected by the Whitney Museum of American Art.

In October 2018, Chan was included in the touring exhibition Computer Grrrls, curated by Inke Arns and Marie Lechner, opening at the HMKV museum in Dortmund, Germany, before being scheduled to tour to La Gaîté Lyrique in Paris and MU in Eindhoven in 2019.

=== Commissions ===
In 2015 Chan took part in the group exhibition Paste, organized by Seize projects where she debuted her website White Or Not Quite? along with a public poster exhibited across Leeds city centre. She participated in ArtSlant's email newsletter project with Mindfulness Matters in which she invited the reader to answer the questions "Are You Living The Life You Always Wanted?", "Do you fall asleep fulfilled with everything you've done?", and "Spending time on your family?"

In 2017 Chan was commissioned by IOTA to create the new work "Important Men", in which the artist creates "her own oeuvre of male portraiture by photographing the important masculine influences in her life."

In 2018 Chan was commissioned to create UX for Cats, a collaborative work made with Cat Bluemke, Jonathan Carroll, and Ben McCarthy for the 10th anniversary of Montreal-based gallery Eastern Bloc.

== Solo exhibitions ==
- 2012, "I'LL SHOW U HD" transmediale, Marshall McLuhan Salon, Canadian Embassy, Berlin
- 2012, "Young Money" Future Gallery, Berlin
- 2015, "Sea Of Men", Galleri CC Malmö
- 2016 "Screening: Jennifer Chan", Western Front
- 2017 "The Blue Pill", Art Gallery of Southwestern Manitoba
