= Legacy Russell =

American curator and writer

- Born: New York City
- Education: Macalester College (BA); Goldsmiths, University of London (MRes)
- Occupations: Executive director and chief curator
- Organization: The Kitchen
- Notable work: Glitch Feminism
- Website: legacyrussell.com

Legacy Russell is an American curator, writer, and author of Glitch Feminism: A Manifesto, published by Verso Books in 2020, Black Meme: A History of the Images that Make Us, also with Verso Books in 2024, and Gay Pompeii with GenderFail and the Pompeii Commitment in 2025. In 2021, the performance and experimental art institution The Kitchen announced Russell as the organization's next executive director and chief curator. From 2018 to 2021, she was the associate curator of exhibitions at the Studio Museum in Harlem.

== Early life and education ==
Russell was born in New York City and grew up in the East Village. She is the daughter of Harlem-born photographer and technologist Ernest Russell and Kamala Mottl, a community gerontologist. She is the great-granddaughter of Nolle Smith, Black cowboy, engineer, and Hawaii statesman. She attended Friends Seminary, a Quaker school in Manhattan. Russell holds a dual-major BA from Macalester College in Studio Art and Art History and English & Creative Writing, as well as an MRes in Art History and Visual Culture with distinction from Goldsmiths, University of London. Her graduate dissertation focused on the notion of "re-performing reality" and shared research on artists such as Devin Kenny, Ann Hirsch, Awol Erizku.

== Career ==
Russell worked at the online platform Artsy, expanding the company's gallery relations across Europe. She has worked at The Metropolitan Museum of Art, The Whitney Museum of Art, the Brooklyn Museum, and CREATIVE TIME. She is a contributing editor at BOMB Magazine.

=== Writing ===
Russell writes about art, gender, race, and technology, particularly as they intersect with histories of cyberculture. In 2012, Russell coined the term "Glitch Feminism", which Russell says "embod[ies] error as a disruption to gender binary, as a resistance to the normative".

In 2019, The Carl & Marilynn Thoma Art Foundation awarded Russell the Arts Writing Award in Digital Arts, which offers awardees a spot in the Rauschenberg Residency fellowship.

Her first book, Glitch Feminism: A Manifesto, was published in September 2020 by Verso Books. A Forbes review stated, "Glitch Feminism is a rallying cry, a recapturing of cyberfeminism oriented to include and spotlight the many queer and non-white voices who in their practice live out the awesome potential of an enmeshed digital feminism: the glitch." The New York Times stated the book is "Grounded in theory... but a fast, percussive read".

In May 2024, Russell published her second book, Black Meme: A History of the Images that Make Us, with Verso Books. According to Russell's website, Black Meme, "explores the impact of Blackness, Black life, and Black social death on contemporary conceptions of virality borne in the age of the Internet". Black Meme was awarded a Creative Capital Award in 2021.

=== Curation and academic research ===
Russell's curatorial and academic work focuses on queer histories, blackness in visual culture, Internet culture, feminism, and new media. As a curator she has done work around her originating concept of Glitch Feminism. Russell has curated exhibitions and projects at the Museum of Modern Art, MoMA PS1, Institute of Contemporary Art, London, Performa's Radical Broadcast, Kunsthall Stavanger in Norway, and The Studio Museum in Harlem.

Russell was associate curator of exhibitions at the Studio Museum in Harlem from 2018 to 2021. In 2021, The Kitchen announced that Russell would succeed Tim Griffin as the institution's next executive director and chief curator; she is the first Black person to hold the position of executive director and chief curator at The Kitchen since its founding in 1971.
