= GenderFail =

Queer publishing and programming initiative

GenderFail is a publishing and programming initiative created by Be Oakley that seeks to encourage projects from an intersectional, queer perspective. Many projects are tied together by the slogan "Radical Softness as a Boundless Form of Resistance". The press is currently based out of Brooklyn, New York. In an April 16, 2020 article "Our Favorite New Yorkers on the Best Things in All Five Boroughs" in Conde Nast Traveler, curator Legacy Russell mentioned GenderFail as one of their favorite things in New York.

== Exhibitions and events ==
GenderFail has been a part of exhibitions, programs and events at A.I.R. Gallery (Feminist & Queer Art Book Fair, 2020), MoMA PS1 (Past and Future Fictions, 2018), The International Center of Photography (Queering the Collection, 2018), The Williams College Museum of Art (Queer Zines: A Conversation and Workshop 2019) Sediment Arts (GenderFail Archive Project, 2018), EFA Project Space (Endless Editions Biennial, 2018) and The Contemporary Artists' Books Conference at Book Culture (2018). GenderFail was featured in the January 2020 Issue of Vogue Italia with an article titled "Failure E Un Po' Rinascere" by journalist Laura Taccari. GenderFail created a reading room at the Center for Book Arts in 2021 titled Imperfect Archiving/Archiving as Practice.

== Publishing projects ==
GenderFail's publications "uses appropriation as a strategy to 'pervert' the canon, contaminate it, but also to give visibility to under-represented and othered forms of being." Lyne Lucian of The Daily Beast noted GenderFail as "an innovative platform representing queer and trans people, and people of color who want to voice their opinions through art".

In October 2018, GenderFail released An Anthology of Failure, which includes essays by Manuel Arturo Abreu, American Artist, Sasha Costanza-Chock, Demian Dinéyazhi', Johanna Hedva, Nicole Killian, Andrea Liu, Be Oakley, Nate Pyper, Sable Elyse Smith, Alok Vaid-Menon and Agustine Zegers. Printed Matter has dedicated a shelf in their bookshop to displaying GenderFail titles. Some of GenderFail's projects take on a digital form, such as Remember Their Name, a page memorializing every trans person who was murdered since 2016.

In 2019 GenderFail published Consciousness by artist Lex Brown. Their book GenderFail Reader 1 was named one of OutTV's 19 best reads of 2019.
