= Lex Brown (artist) =

American video and performance artist

Lex Brown (born 1989) is an American video and performance artist. Brown's performance work deals with self-reflection, politics, and design. Brown has shown work at the New Museum, The Kitchen, The High Line, Socrates Sculpture Park and International Center for Photography in New York City, the Antenna Gallery in New Orleans, Louisiana, and VIA Music Festival in Pittsburgh, Pennsylvania, as part of their Women in Sound series.

== Early life and education ==
Brown was born in Oakland, California. She grew up in Northern Virginia and attended Princeton University for her A.B. in visual art and archaeology where she graduated summa cum laude. Brown received her M.F.A. at the Yale University sculpture program. Brown has participated in several artist residencies including Chautauqua Institute in Chautauqua, New York, Skowhegan School of Painting and Sculpture, in Skowhegan, Maine, and Yale-Norfolk School of Art in New Haven, Connecticut and the Paul Klee residency program in Switzerland for summer 2016.

== Work ==
Brown's work examines the personal and emotional ranges as a form of engaging with social and economic systems. Brown has created experimental TV shows that has challenged televisions conventions by focusing on human to human interactions. Her work raises questions by "skewering YouTube makeup tutorials, Big Data, pop-up shops, pop-up windows, and the entertainment-industrial complex."

In 2015, Brown published a short novel entitled My Wet Hot Drone Summer, as part of BadLands Unlimited's "New Lovers," a series of erotic fiction. Brown has also published their first monograph, Consciousness (2019), with GenderFail Press in 2019. Brown is also included in Thomas Hirschhorn's Gramsci Project publication. In 2024 Brown was awarded the Rome Prize in Visual Arts at the American Academy in Rome.

== Exhibitions ==
=== Solo exhibitions ===
- The Inside Room, Recess Art, New York, 2019
- Animal Static, The Kitchen, New York, 2019
- They Flew to Nova, Kate Werble Gallery, New York, 2020

=== Exhibitions and performances ===
- Lex Brown Town, New Museum, New York, 2017
- C.E. (Performance) with Aaron Fowler, New Museum, New York, 2018

== Publications ==
- Wet Hot Drove Summer. Badlands Unlimited, 2015.
- Consciousness. GenderFail, 2019.
