= Alfredo Salazar-Caro =

Mexican digital media artist

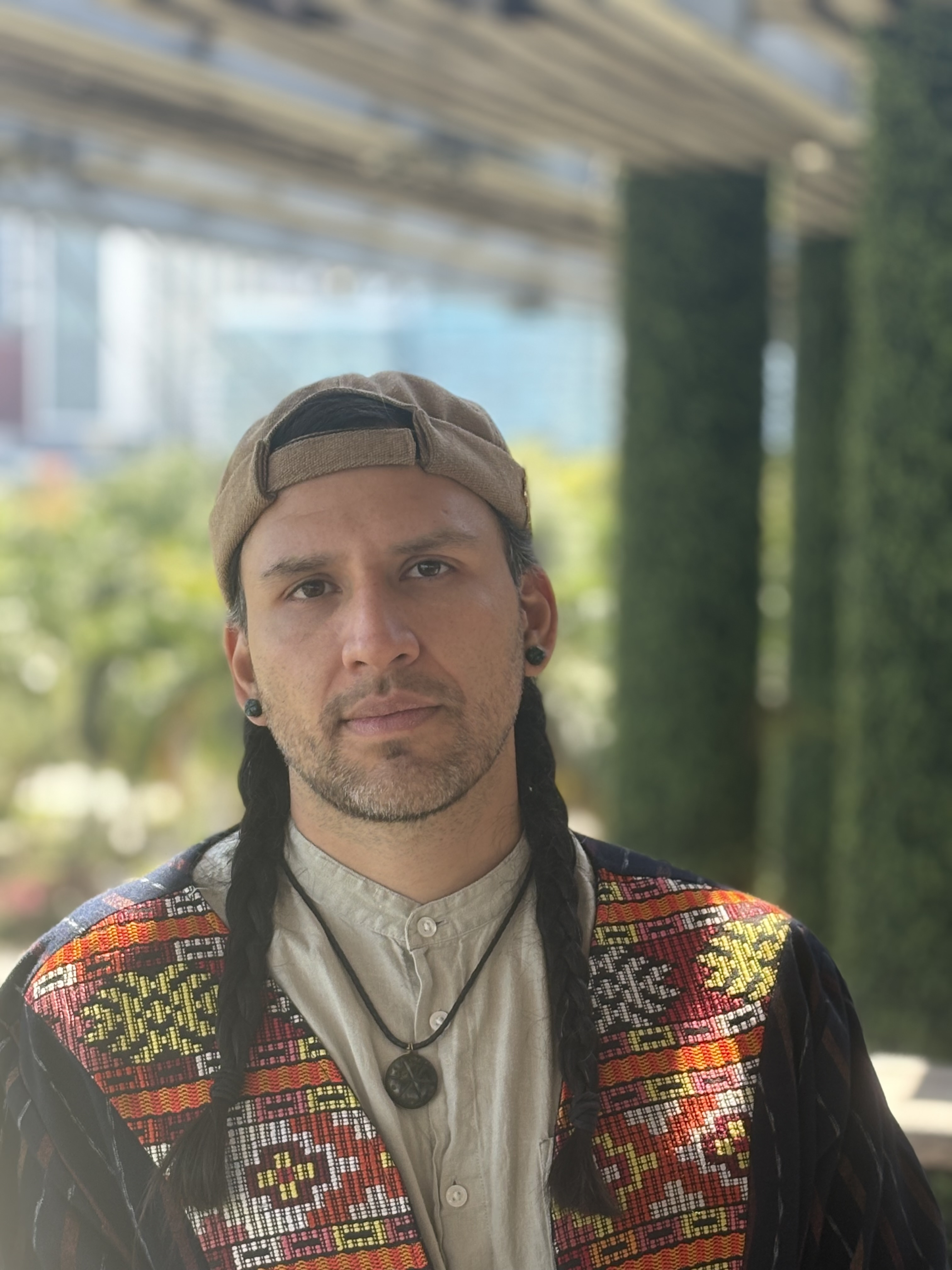
- Born: Mexico City, Mexico
- Education: School of the Art Institute of Chicago
- Known for: Digital art, Video art
- Notable work: Dreams of the Jaguar's Daughter (2019)

Alfredo Salazar-Caro (born 1989 in Mexico City) is an interdisciplinary artist working across digital media. Salazar-Caro is a founder of the Digital Museum of Digital Art (DiMoDA), a virtual reality platform dedicated to the development, exhibition, preservation of virtual reality and digital artworks. He is based between Mexico, United States and the internet.

== Early life and education ==
Alfredo Salazar-Caro was born in Mexico City, and conducted his visual arts studies at the School of the Art Institute of Chicago (SAIC), Illinois. Salazar-Caro met fellow digital artist William Robertson in art school and they later founded the Digital Museum of Digital Art (DiMoDA) together in 2015.

== Career ==
Alfredo Salazar-Caro's digital media artworks involve a myriad genres such as portraiture, self-portraiture, installation, virtual reality, augmented reality, video, documentary, sculpture, biocompatible architecture, and social practice.

Salazar-Caro has exhibited his work in museums and festivals such as Tribeca Film Festival, MUTEK Festival, Mexico City; the Pérez Art Museum Miami, Florida; Whitney Museum, New York; the Wrong Biennale, São Paulo; the Hangar, Italy; and HeK Switzerland, among others.

His work has been featured in arts and digital culture magazines and publications such as Leonardo, Cultured Magazine, Vice Magazine, The Brooklyn Rail, VoCA - Voices in Contemporary Art, Die ungerahmte Welt / The Unframed World.

In the summer of 2018, he was an artist-in-residence at Brooklyn-based arts organization Pioneer Works as part of its Technology Residency program.

In 2020, Salazar-Caro received A Blade of Grass Fellowship for Person of Color (POC) Emerging Artists in New York City. The proposal encompassed the development of Chapters 2 and 3 of his VR film Dreams of the Jaguar's Daughter trilogy. The three cinematic pieces take on the 2018 passage of a migrant caravan through Guatemala, Mexico, and into the Arizona desert. In his cinematic approach, the artist assemblages archeological and mythological imagery and surrealistic landscapes to honor the lives and culture of those who follow this path.

The Pérez Art Museum Miami, Florida, commissioned and presented the augmented reality work Como Semillas en el Viento as part of the institution's digital engagement initiatives in 2024. PAMM collaborated with Alfredo Salazar-Caro and Mutek Festival in Mexico City to present the work and engage viewers in the urban setting.

== Work ==
=== Dreams of the Jaguar's Daughter, Chapter 1 (2019) ===
Exploring migration, geography, and citizenship, the film is a virtual reality documentary trilogy following the character of Achik', the spirit of a young Mayan immigrant individual who accompanies viewers through her memories of a journey from Central to North America. Dreams of the Jaguar's Daughter, Chapter 1, was presented at the Tribeca Film Festival in New York in 2019.

=== Coatlicue y Mictlantecuhtli (2023) ===
Coatlicue y Mictlantecuhtli draws from Mexica pantheon cosmologies to tell the story of Coatlicue (Nahuatl: She Who’s Skirt is made of Snakes or “Tonantzin Coatlicue”, Nahuatl: Venerable Mother, Dear Mother”) as a symbol of fertility and ferocity on earth in juxtaposition with Mictlantecuhtli (“Lord of the Underworld”), who represents the pathways of souls in the afterlife and the dichotomy of life and death. Coatlicue y Mictlantecuhtli was exhibited in Sea Change (2024) on PAMM.TV from the Pérez Art Museum Miami.

=== Como Semillas en el Viento (2024) ===
Como Semillas en el Viento is a "digital sculpture" and augmented reality essay poem combining tridimensional-scanned archeological objects from the Mexican pantheon with surreal 3D-scanned portraits of immigrant workers from South and Central America. The piece accompanies a sound poem inspired by each participating individual in the work and pays homage to their life stories, cultures, and societal contributions. Como Semillas en el Viento was commissioned by the Pérez Art Museum Miami, Florida, and has been exhibited as part of the 2024 Mutek Festival, Mexico City programming, as well as globally through a VR application.

== Digital Museum of Digital Art (DiMoDA) ==
Alfredo Salazar-Caro cofounded the Digital Museum of Digital Art (DiMoDA) with fellow artist William Robertson in 2015, a virtual reality platform that showcases, preserves and develops digital media arts online. According to the founders, DiMoDA is interested in investing in digital artists from diverse backgrounds who are not usually centered in art and technology circles.

In 2017, the RISD Museum at the Rhode Island School of Design, Providence, presented DiMoDA 2.0: Morphe Presence, a curation of artworks by emerging artists showcasing new developments in virtual reality.
