= Patrick Lichty =

American artist

- Born: October 5, 1962 (age 63); Cuyahoga Falls Ohio
- Education: MFA Computer Art, BS Electronic Engneerng Technology
- Alma mater: Bowling Green State University (2006), The Univerasity of Akron (1990)
- Known for: RTMark/The Yes Men, Second Front, Manifest.AR, Virtual Fluxus
- Spouse: Negin Ehtesabian

Patrick Lichty is a conceptual media artist, activist, curator, and educator. Lichty is currently a Creative Digital Media professor at Winona State University.

== Artwork ==
Lichty was part of the activist collective RTMark (pronounced "art-mark"). Lichty was also member of RTMark's successor group The Yes Men, and is featured in the collective's first documentary.

He is a creator of digital tapestries, especially Jacquard weaving, and is noted alongside Chuck Close as a seminal contemporary artist in this genre. In December 2014, he had a solo exhibition of his tapestry and robotic drawing work called "Sensible Concepts: Mediation as a Way of Being".

He is a co-founder of Second Front, a pioneering Second Life performance art group.

Lichty was an associate member of the first Augmented Reality art collective.

== New Media Curation ==
Lichty is a noted New Media art curator, speaking at venues such as the Tate Modern, and is published in the book, New Media in the White Cube and Beyond: Curatorial Models for Digital Art, edited by Whitney Museum of American Art digital curator, Christiane Paul.

In December 2021, Lichty curated Through the Mesh: Media, Borders, and Firewalls at the NeMe Art Center in Limassol, Cyprus

== Residencies, recognition, and awards ==
- Summer School: Curatorial Masterclass (with CRUMB) (2009)
- Virginia Center for the Creative Arts Residency (2013)
- Herb Alpert Foundation/CalArts Fellowship (Film/Video – RTMark) 2002
- Eyebeam Artist in Residence 2009
- Smithsonian American Art Museums New Media-New Century Award (2001)

=== Collections/Galleries ===
Lichty's work is in collections of The Walker Art Center, Minneapolis, MN and the Smithsonian. He also works as a curator and critic.

== Bibliography ==
- Lichty, Patrick (2008), "Reconfiguring Curation: Non-institutional New Media Curating and the Politics of Cultural Production", in Paul, Christiane (ed.), New Media in the White Cube and Beyond: Curatorial Models for Digital Art, University of California, pp. 163–190, ISBN 978-0520243972
- Lichty, Patrick (2008), "(re)distributions: PDA, Information Appliance, and Nomadic Arts as Cultural Intervention", in Paul, Christiane (ed.), New Media in the White Cube and Beyond: Curatorial Models for Digital Art, University of California, pp. 207–219, ISBN 978-0520243972
- Lichty, Patrick (2013). Variant Analyses: Interrogations of New Media Art and Culture. Institute of Network Cultures.
- Lichty, Patrick (2015), "On Virtual Fluxus", in Miura, Gianluca (ed.), Analyzing Art, Culture, and Design in the Digital Age, Advances in Media, Entertainment, and the Arts, Cham: IGI, pp. 39–50, doi:10.4018/978-1-4666-8679-3, ISBN 978-1466686793, S2CID 55016634
- Lichty, Patrick (2018). new memory rescue. Abstract Editions. ISBN 978-1548371951.
- Lichty, Patrick (2014), "The Aesthetics of Liminality: Augmentation as an Art Form", in Geroimenko, Vladimir (ed.), Augmented Reality Art, Cham: Springer International Publishing, pp. 99–125, ISBN 978-3-030-42156-4
- Lichty, Patrick (2020), "The Aesthetics of Liminality: Augmentation as an Art Form", in Geroimenko, Vladimir (ed.), Augmented Reality in Education, Springer Series on Cultural Computing, Cham: Springer International Publishing, pp. 261–278, doi:10.1007/978-3-319-06203-7_5, ISBN 978-3-319-06202-0
- Lichty, Patrick (February 1, 2014). The Translation of Art in Virtual Worlds. Oxford University Press. doi:10.1093/oxfordhb/9780199826162.013.027.
