= Faith Holland =

New media artist (born 1985)

- Born: Faith Holland; February 10, 1985 (age 41); Hudson Valley, New York, U.S.
- Education: School of Visual Arts, Vassar College
- Movement: Internet art
- Awards: P3: Post-Photography Prototyping Prize – name 2016 shortlist – role
- Website: faithholland.com

Faith Holland (born February 10, 1985) is a new media artist based in New York City. Her work engages with deconstructing female sexualization in the digital space and incorporates sculpture, video, and photography.

== Personal life and education ==
Holland was born on February 10, 1985. She earned her M.F.A from School of Visual Arts and her B.A from Vassar College. She currently teaches at Pratt and Pace University. She is a new media artist who is known for digital GIFs that focus on the body and sexualization in digital landscapes. Her breakthrough performance, "Porn Interventions", was streamed on RedTube and depicted her shaving her legs. Holland lives in New York City with her husband Seth Barry Watter, four cats and daughter.

== Career ==
=== Exhibitions ===
Holland's first solo show, Technophilia, was at Transfer Gallery in 2015. Her work Lick Suck Screen 2 (2014) was included in the 2015 online exhibition Body Anxiety (curated by Ann Hirsch). In 2016, Holland also showed at the Jamaica Center for Arts and Learning, in an exhibition called Female Adapter, as part of her residency at the center. Holland also held residencies at Harvest Works.

In 2017 to 2018, Holland's show Speculative Fetish at Transfer Gallery included two bodies of work: Queer Fetishes (lasercut photo prints depicting mismatched "male" and "female" wire connections held together with nail polish) and The Fetishes (electronic devices covered in various substances and displaying GIFs taken from internet porn). Also exhibited, the video Wire Bath shows the artist bathing in a tub of Ethernet cords. For use in Speculative Fetish, Holland spent a year collecting her own pubic hair.

=== Other works ===
In 2014, Lorna Mills curated a video series, entitled Ways of Something, based on art historian John Berger's 1971 documentary Ways of Seeing. For this, thirty different web-based artists were invited per episode to create a single minute of footage about their contemporary practice. Faith Holland's work is represented in episode 1, minute 29 of this work.

== See also ==
- Carla Gannis
- Lindsay Howard
