= Emilie Gervais =

Canadian artist

Émilie Gervais
- Born: Montreal, Quebec
- Occupation: Artist
- Movement: Internet artist, new media artist, conceptual artist

Émilie Gervais is a Canadian new media artist based in Paris, France. Her work explores the relationships between internet, network culture, art and its mediation. In the past, she has described herself as, "a starry background artist working with the internet, deleting and restoring stuff, interacting with stuff and people".

== Biography ==
Her father is an architect, her mother is an elementary teacher and her brother a music producer/artist and marketing strategist. Émilie Grew up in Saint-Lambert, Mont-Tremblant, San Francisco, Montreal and its south shore before moving to Aix-en-Provence for her master's degree. , Gervais attended Collège Charles-Lemoyne in Ste-Catherine, the Lycée Français in San Francisco, and different public schools. After graduating from Cégep de Saint-Laurent, Gervais pursued her studies at the École supérieure d'art d'Aix-en-Provence in France graduating with a DNAP (BFA) in 2011 and a DNSEP (Master) in 2013.

== Career ==
Emilie Gervais began working with computers from an early age. In a 2013 interview with Benoit Palop, she said that it was like playing ice hockey for her. Working with gendered representations and power relations, Gervais applies a '90s internet aesthetic through works like, Blinking Girls (with Sarah Weis, 2012), backdoortrojangirl.net (2012), and the HTML collection of crowd-sourced works w-h-a-t-e-v-e-r.net, where contributors upload their own work under the dictate of "boy art" or "girl art". In 2014, Dazed, named her one of their ten favorite digifeminist artists.

The uncompromising nature of Gervais' work carries a strong message. Feminist artists have found a unique venue for free expression in the internet and Gervais is at the leading edge of that movement. She inverts and distorts the language and aesthetics of the primitive internet to create art that is ultimately meaningful. The work Blinking Girls (2012) deals with the similarities between women and video games characters. The main character, Tasha, is Eve from Leisure Suit Larry in the Land of the Lounge Lizards, rebranded as a pimptress who believes all men are women and all women must pimp themselves out online and own themselves in all of their submissions.

Conceptually, Gervais is most interested in the creative process. As part of her practice, Gervais tends to erase everything that she posts making her online presence both ubiquitous and ephemeral. Tracking down Gervais' artworks requires browsing archives, mirror sites or following her closely through social media. Most of her production is either deleted after it is "processed" or it "mutates" into something else.

In 2015, she showcased Pizzasexual (2015), in the group exhibition Porn to Pizza, curated by Tina Sauerländer at the DAM Gallery in Berlin. The sculpture featured an iPhone displaying 3d rendered porn characters having a threesome in front of a pizza textured wall. The iPhone was embedded into an actual pizza. Visitors were invited to swipe through the digital images on display with their greasy fingers.

Gervais' sensitivity to the physical object is further evidenced in the piece, Not Sure if Art or Copyright Infringement (2015), a digital painting based on an image of Princess Peach. The work, inspired by an internet meme, questions the distinction between art and copyright infringement.

=== Curatorial Practice ===
In 2011, Gervais co-launched Art Object Culture with Lucy Chinen. Art Object Culture was an online venue inviting artists to create new art objects from preexisting commercial products available from online stores. The idea was to expand the language of the art world by absorbing the products of new industries. The project was discontinued when the artists saw redundancy with the establishment of online art galleries by the corporate world.

In 2013, Gervais and Félix Magal created Museum of Internet to archive new iconographies emerging from the web. The project takes form under a website and a Facebook page. Images are added everyday increasing the data bank limitlessly. The contributions are curated by the artists but not censored except for the ones on Facebook. Museum of Internet is the internet caricaturing itself.

=== Writings ===
In 2014, Gervais published A Letter to Young Internet Artists on Animal New York in which she highlights that art is about information. The work was also exhibited in Offline Art: 'Your are not checked in', curated by Aram Bartholl, as part of Transmediale 2015.
