= Yulia Pinkusevich =

Visual artist based in San Francisco Bay Area

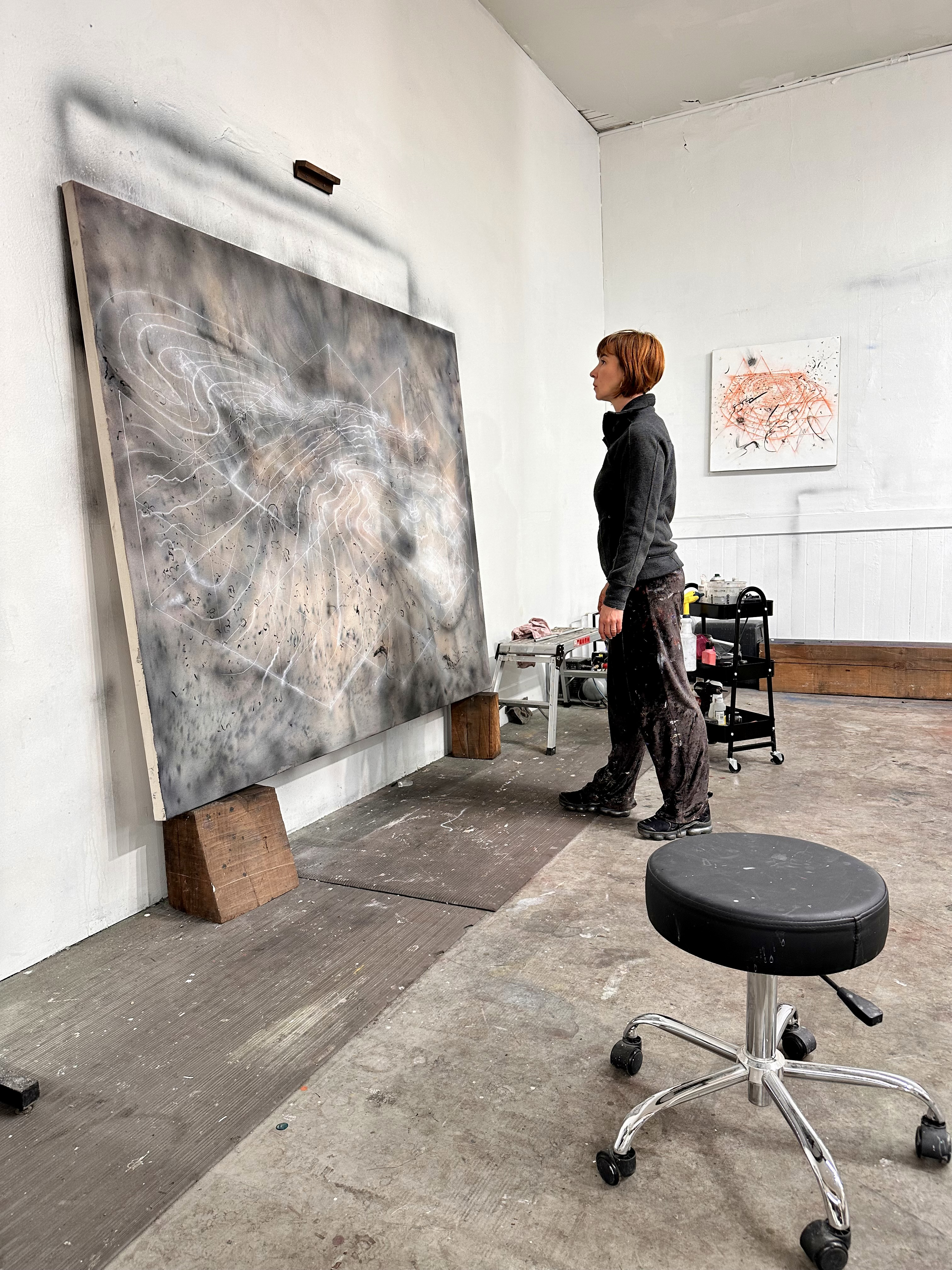
- Yulia Pinkusevich in the studio, 2023.
- Born: 1982 (age 43–44); Kharkiv, Ukrainian SSR, USSR
- Education: BFA from Rutgers University; MFA from Stanford University
- Known for: Painting; Sculpture
- Movement: Conceptual art Abstract; Graphic art
- Website: www.yuliapink.com

Yulia Pinkusevich (born 1982, Kharkiv, Ukraine) is a Ukrainian-born American visual artist working across various disciplines including painting, drawing, and sculpture. Since 2014, she has been the Joan Danforth Professor of Painting at Mills College of Northeastern in Oakland, California.

== Work ==
Pinkusevich creates large-scale multi-faceted installation work that presents viewers with visually immersive environments. In an interview, she explains: "Conceptually, my work is concerned with this fragmented vision of architectural layering and perceptions of the built environment. Formally, the work is engaged with the direct experience of the viewer through "perspectival" illusion and spatial perception that play with the subconscious and cognitive understanding of space. By breaking logical perspectives I create illusions of impossible spaces, non-places that shift the viewpoint to the panoptic."
