= LaTurbo Avedon =

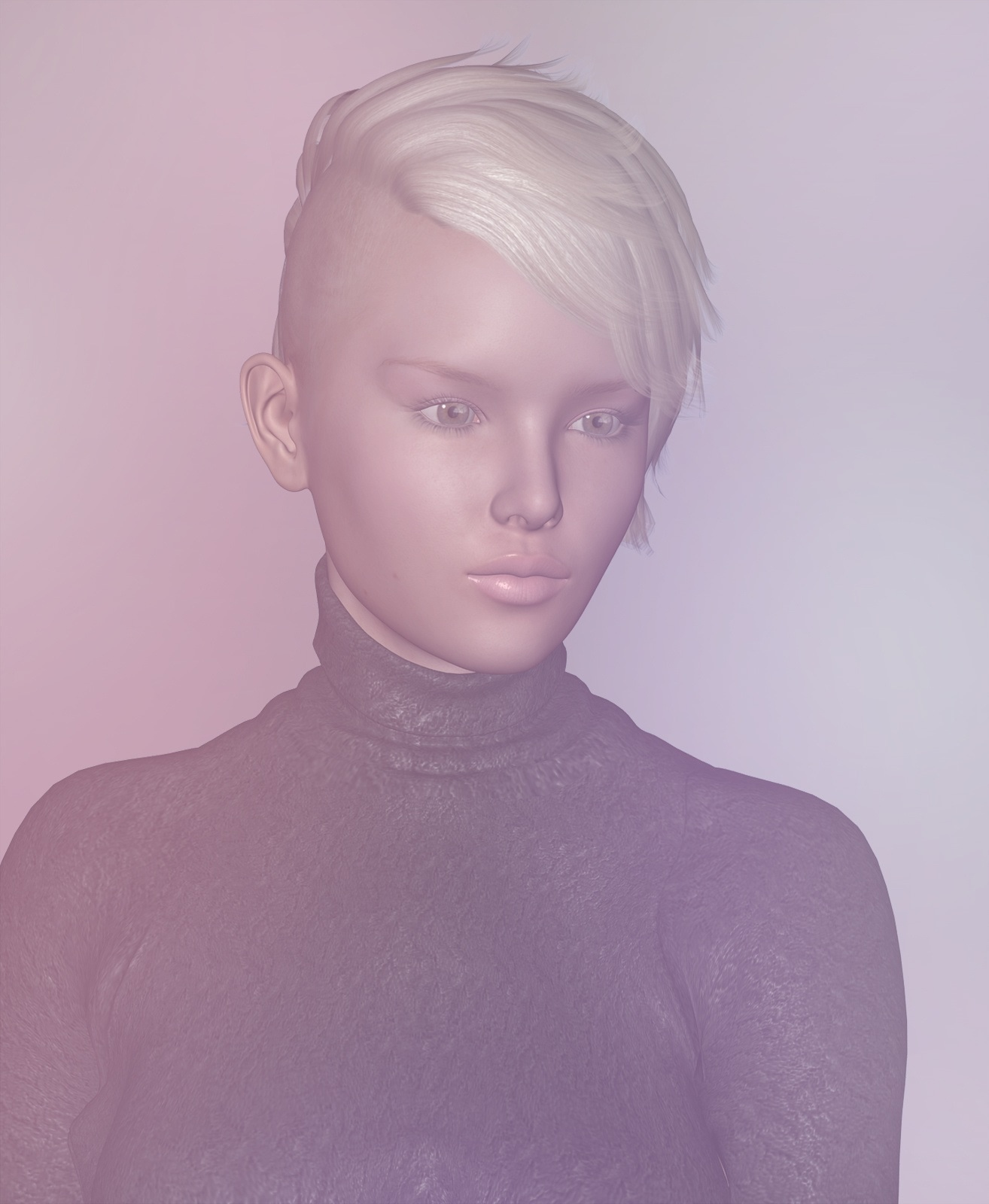
- Occupation(s): Artist; Curator
- Notable work: Panther Modern (2013); Club Rothko (2012)
- Website: turboavedon.com

LaTurbo Avedon is an avatar artist, curator, the designer and founder of Panther Modern. Their work emphasizes the practice of nonphysical identity and authorship since 2008–2009. They have explored the growing relationship between users and virtual environments. They create this body of work using the simulation tools of the current moment. The genesis of their identity occurred in various profile creation processes, eventually taking a more rigid form in Second Life.

Their work has appeared internationally including TRANSFER Gallery (New York), transmediale (Berlin), Haus der elektronischen Künste (Basel), The Whitney Museum (New York), HMVK (Dortmund), Barbican Center (London), and Galeries Lafayette (Paris).

In 2020, Avedon created an emoji as part of Unicode 13.0. emoji character library. The new emoji is "Mirror" and is available in Emoji 13.0 for platforms.

LaTurbo Avedon were a resident in The Virtual Factory, Manchester International Festival in July 2020 and in 2016–2017 they were the first virtual resident of the Somerset House Studios in London, exploring nonphysical interaction and studio practices. Their simulated lectures and exhibitions have been hosted internationally, all constructed using game engines and character creation software.

Avedon has worked on commission with the Manchester International Festival (2020), Samsung FRAME (2017), Mapping Festival PARADIGM SHIFT(2017), GIPHY+ Rhizome (2016) and CTM Festival (2015).

== Projects ==
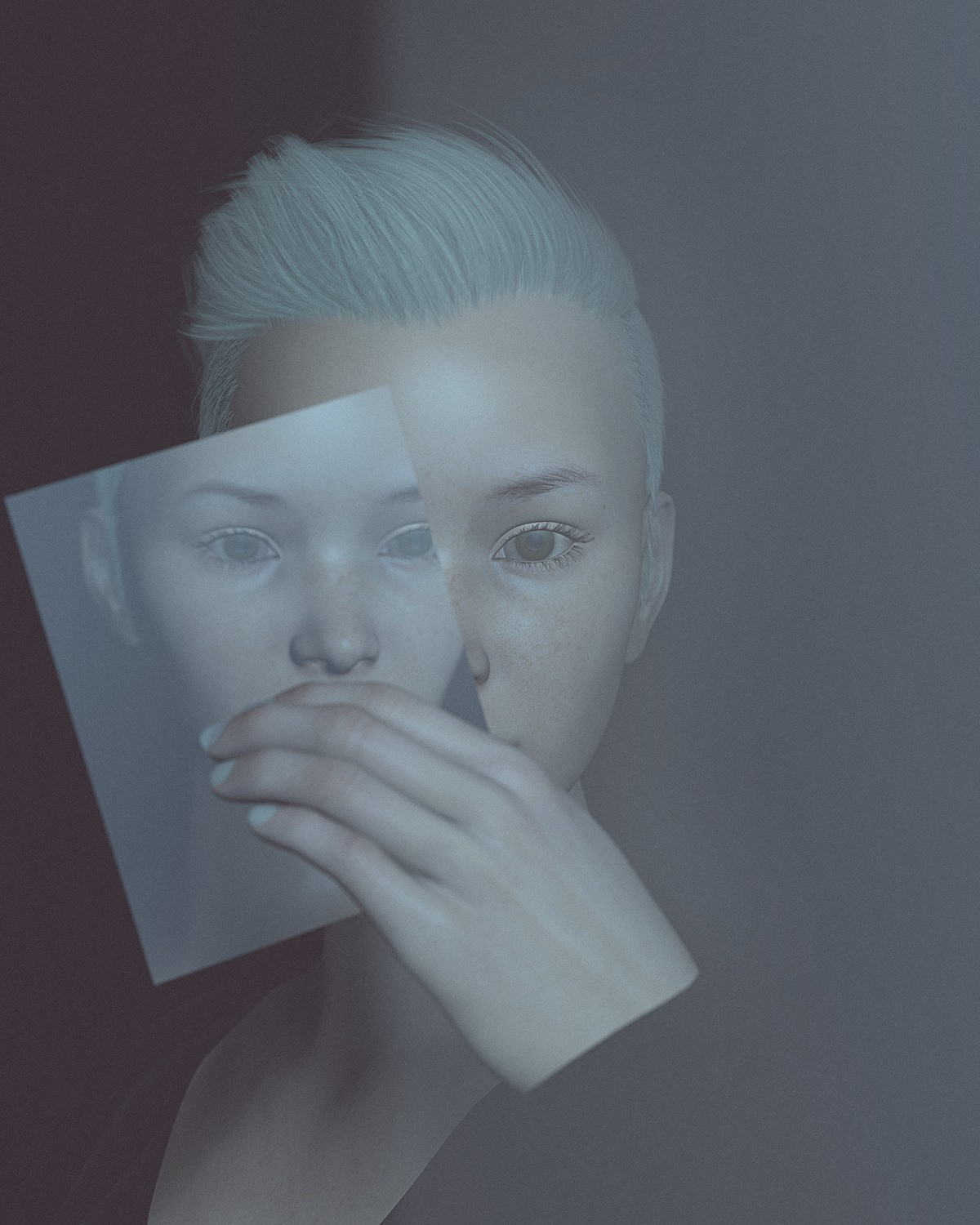
LaTurbo Avedon Self Portrait, 2017

=== Your Progress Will Be Saved ===
This project is the first virtual factory, an online experience created by Avedon who reimagines The Factory within Fortnite Creative, designed by Rem Koolhaas's OMA, Ellen van Loon as lead architect and backed by Manchester City Council, HM Government and Arts Council England.

The factory is a cultural space in Manchester, home to the Manchester International Festival (MIF) 2020.

=== Panther Modern ===
In 2013, Avedon founded and designed Panther Modern, a file-based exhibition space built using 3D model files, encouraging artists to create site-specific installations for the internet. The Panther has expanded to seventeen installation rooms, which was created with Cinema4D with a new area being added to the virtual model for each new artist. Since its launch it has hosted works by a variety of New Media and Digital Artists, including Morehshin Allahyari, Claudia Hart, Kim Laughton, and Jonathan Monaghan.

Panther Modern provides a variety of methods to produce works in virtual space, the artist is able to choose the format in which they will share their installations. Completed rooms are added to the existing architecture, allowing the shape of Panther Modern to change with each project.

=== Club Rothko ===
Avedon created a virtual night club called Club Rothko in 2012 that works to intersect the online world and the real world, inspired by night clubs in virtual environments such as Second Life and Mass Effect 2.

The Club Rothko Builder allowed users to make their own 3D sculptures. The most well-known image of Club Rothko is from an interaction with a painting of philosopher Slavoj Žižek.

In 2013, the goal was to fill the virtual place with statues created from selfies emailed to LaTurbo Avedon and then be uploaded to the web and emailed to the submitter in a .zip file.

In 2015, Avedon returned to Club Rothko with a new video "Save 02", that was exhibited at the CICA Museum in Czong, Korea and at the Museum Angewandtekunst, Frankfurt, Germany. This video finds the avatar of the digital artist moving through the virtual disco filled with light projections and producing music on Ableton Live.

=== Hatsune Miku ===
Avedon has collaborated on the production of 16-year-old humanoid Hatsune Miku's shows in London and elsewhere. The initial project "Still Be Here" was commissioned by CTM Festival and debuted at Transmediale in February 2016. Narrative was created by Mari Matsutoya, music by Laurel Halo, character motion by Darren Johnston, produced by Martin Sulzer, visual design and staging by LaTurbo Avedon.

== Solo artist ==
- Manchester International Festival, “Your Progress Will Be Saved”, 2020
- Offsite Project, “A new screen name changes everything “, 2019
- Webspace Gallery, “Sunset at Mt. Gox”, 2014
- TRANSFER Gallery, “New Sculpt”, 2013
- Gallery Online, “Club Rothko”, 2013

== Group exhibitions (selection) ==
- das.08 - experimental artistic dialogues: UNI, DOUBLE, COLLECTIVE. Identity at the age of Metaverse. LaTurbo Avedon | Auriea Harvey | Kamilia Kard | Mara Oscar Cassiani, CUBO - the corporate museum of Unipol Group, Bologna, Italy, 2025
- Pérez Art Museum Miami, "Sea Change," 2024
- Upstream Gallery, “The New outside”, 2020
- Platform SHAPE, “Transmediale- Future Worlds of Entanglement: Eternity Be Kind+ AIDOL”, 2020
- PAF OLOMOUC Animation and Contemporary Art Festival, Czech Republic, 2019
- Bannister Gallery, Copernicus, 2019
- Arebyte Gallery, Re Figured Ground, Lound, 2018
- Chronus Art Center, Transfer Download, Shanghai, 2017
- Whitney Museum, Ways of something- Dreamlands, 2016
- Donaufestival, Still be Here, Austria, 2016
- The Wrong Digital Art Biennale, International, 2015
- CICA Museum, Across Voices, Gimpo, South Korea, 2015
- The 4th Computer Art Congress, Rio de Janeiro, 2014
- The Wrong Biennale, Young internet Based Artists, 2013
- Museum of Modern Art, New York, PopRally: Abstract Currents, 2013
- Speed Show: TRANSFER3D, Wroclaw, Poland, 2012

== Selected conferences and lectures ==
- MINIMUM LABYRINTH - Gray Area Festival, 2020
- No Body But Me - Actor & Avatar Conference - ZHDK Zurich, 2019
- MAKING MY WAY DOWNTOWN - Software for Artists Day 5 – Pioneer Works, 2019
- From Here We Dream Sublime – MediaLive Subterranean, BMoCA – Boulder, 2019
- Remember Me As DLC – ULTRAVIRUS Festival – Sydney, 2018
- Technology and the Occult – Interfaces Monthly/Barbican Centre, London, 2018
- The Real Fake – Conversations at the Edge – School of the Art Institute, 2017
- Nocturnal City: Conversation with Estela Oliva – MUTEK Monreal, 2017
