= Morehshin Allahyari =

Iranian-American new media artist and activist

- موره شین اللهیاری
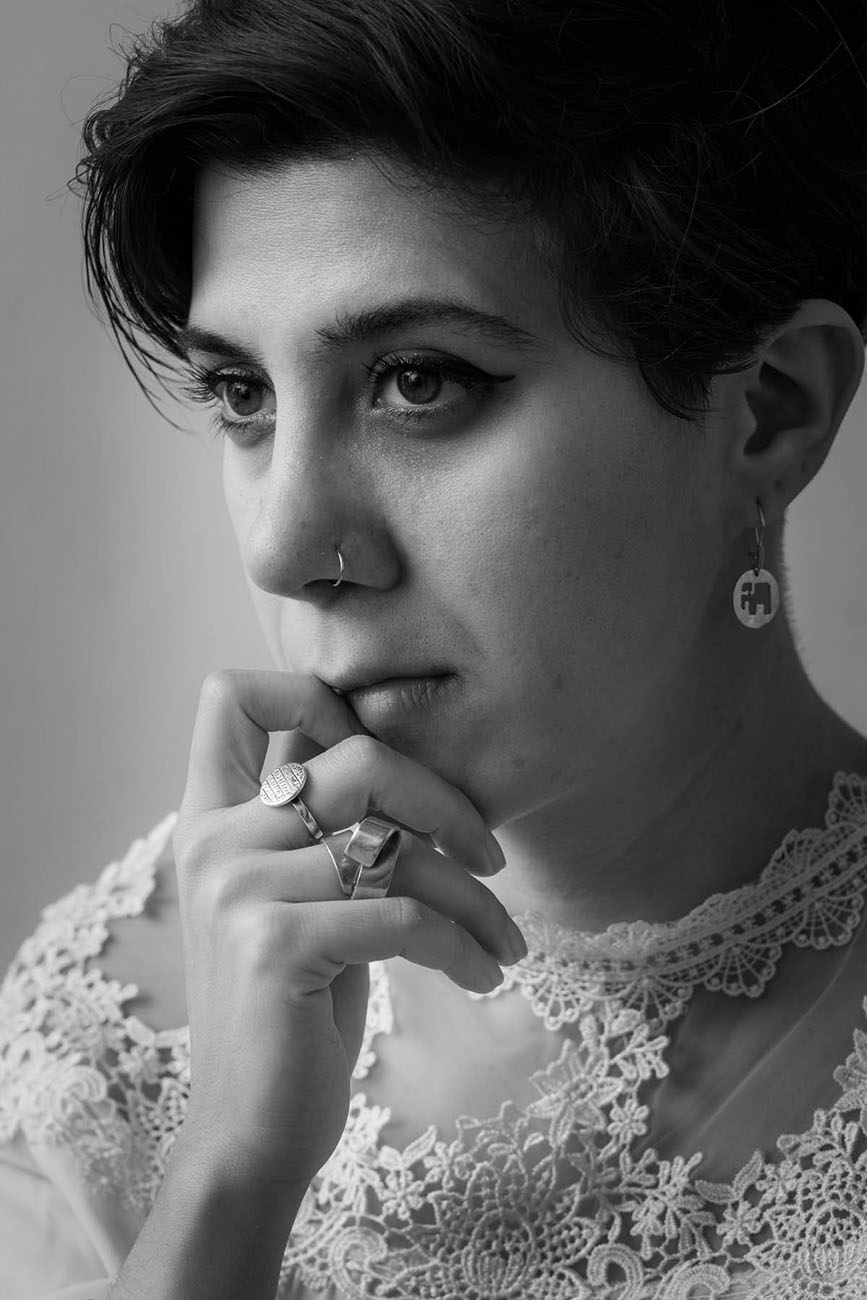
- Born: Morehshin Allahyari; 1985 (age 40–41); Tehran, Iran
- Education: University of Tehran; University of Denver; University of North Texas
- Known for: 3D Printing, New Media Art, Additivism
- Notable work: Material Speculation: ISIS; She Who Sees The Unknown
- Movement: Conceptual, Additivism, New Media Art
- Website: http://www.morehshin.com/

Morehshin Allahyari (Persian: موره‌شین اللهیاری; born 1985) is an Iranian media artist, activist, and writer based in the Bay Area and an assistant professor of digital media art at Stanford University. Her work questions current political, socio-cultural, and gender norms, particularly exploring the relationship between technology, history, and art activism. Through archival practices and storytelling, her work weaves together complex counternarratives in opposition to the lasting influence of Western technological colonialism in the context of MENA (Middle East and North Africa). Allahyari’s artworks include 3D-printed objects, videos, experimental animation, web art, and publications. As a 2017 research resident at Eyebeam, Allahyari also worked on the concept of "Digital Colonialism"; a term she has coined since 2015.

She is known for her projects Material Speculation: ISIS (2015–2016), which is a series of 3D-printed sculptural reconstructions of ancient artifacts destroyed by ISIS (2015–2016); She Who Sees The Unknown (2017–2020), The 3D Additivist Manifesto and Cookbook (2015–2016).

== Early life ==
Morehshin Allahyari was born in 1985 and raised in Tehran, Iran, during the Iran-Iraq War. She is ethnically Kurdish.

Allahyari took an interest in the arts from a young age. At age 12, she joined a private creative writing course, where she learned about the importance of telling personal narratives. This group continued until she was 18 and became a launching point for the rest of her work.

Allahyari attended the University of Tehran from 2003 until 2007, B.A. degree in social science and media studies. She moved to the United States in 2007 to continue her studies. She attended the University of Denver, and received a M.A. degree (2009) in digital media studies; followed by study at the University of North Texas from 2010 to 2012, and received a M.F.A. degree in new media art

== Selected work ==
=== She Who Sees the Unknown (2017–2020) ===
She Who Sees the Unknown (2017–2020) is a long-term research-based project that uses 3D modeling, 3D scanning, 3D printing, and storytelling to re-create monstrous female/queer figures of Middle Eastern origin, using the traditions and myths associated with them to explore the catastrophes of colonialism, patriarchism, and environmental degradation. This body of work has many components to it: an archive of the female/genderless monstrous and jinn figures with related research and materials, as well as installations, text, video, and the 3D printed sculptures of the chosen figures. Two of the jinn sculptures are Huma and Ya'jooj Ma'jooj. Allahyari describes this work as actions that "offer another method to re-situate power,” she told The Verge in an article by Lizzie Plaugic, "Through researching dark goddesses, monstrous, and jinn female figures of Middle Eastern origin, poetic-speculative storytelling, re-appropriation of traditional mythologies, collaging, meshing, 3D scanning, 3D printing, and archiving."

She Who Sees the Unknown has been shown at Transfer Gallery, Hartware Media Art Association, The Shed, the New York Armory, Moscow Museum of Modern Art, New Museum, The Ford Foundation Gallery, among others.

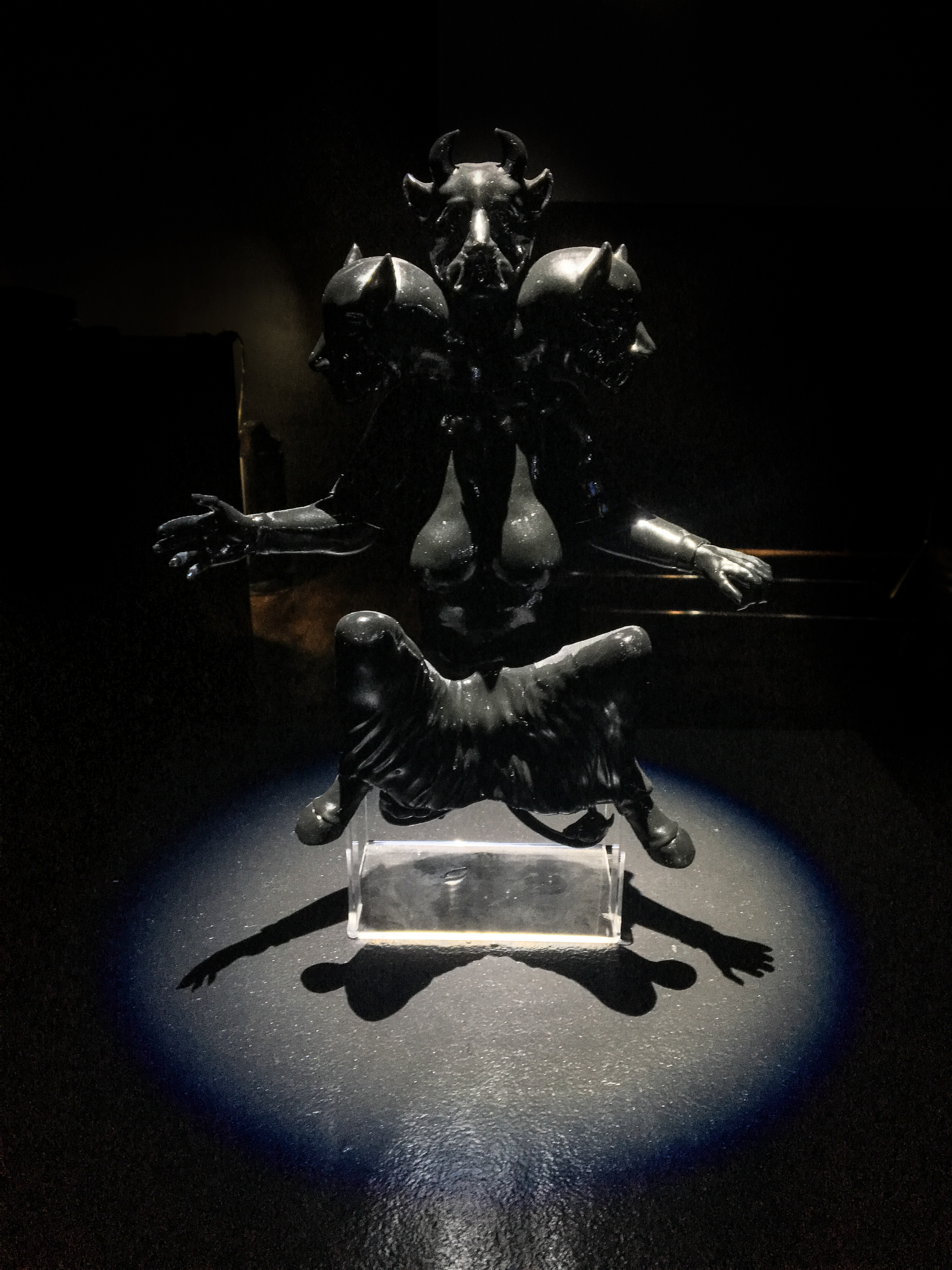
She Who Sees the Unknown (2017-2020)

=== The Laughing Snake (2018) ===
In continuance with themes of all-powerful feminine and queer jinn from Islamic mythology, Allahyari debuted "The Laughing Snake" (2018), a web project co-commissioned by The Whitney Museum, Liverpool Biennale, and FACT. The resultant work is an interactive browser-based experience consisting of hyperlinked poetry, soundscapes, and 3D animations hosted on Whitney Museum's Artnet portal. The work uses the myth of jinn to explore the status of women, sexual desire, and the female body in the Middle East. According to the original myth appearing in the fourteenth and fifteenth-century Arabic manuscript Kitab al-bulhan (Book of Wonders), the Laughing Snake had taken over a city, murdering its people and animals while numerous attempts to kill her remained unsuccessful. An old man finally destroyed the snake by holding up a mirror to her, which made her laugh so hard at her reflection that she died. Using images of the snake and the mirror, Allahyari takes us through a labyrinthine online narrative that mixes personal and imagined stories to address topics such as femininity, sexual abuse, morality, and hysteria. The snake emerges as a complex figure, reflecting multifaceted and sometimes distorted views of the female and refracting images of otherness and monstrosity.

The Laughing Snake 3D printed sculpture and Hypertext web project are in the collection of The Whitney Museum of American Art.

=== Material Speculation: ISIS (2015–2016) ===
Material Speculation is a project that is a combination of digital fabrication and 3D printing that "inspects Petropolitical and poetic relationships between 3D Printing, Plastic, Oil, Technocapitalism and Jihad". Part of a group exhibition at John Jay College of Criminal Justice, The Missing: Rebuilding the Past, artists use creative means to protest "preventable loss" from destruction in conflict zones in Iraq and Syria. From 2015 to 2016, Allahyari recreated twelve artifacts, all which were original and were destroyed by ISIS in 2015 at Mosul Museum. Inside of each artifact there is a USB drive and/or memory card containing all of the research she conducted on the topic, including images, maps, videos, and PDF files. Other artists in the exhibit provide evidence of the violence seen in war, but Allahyari's pieces indicate a look toward the future. She is "seeking an institution that can preserve the data in a digital archive to provide open access to all this information so others may construct their own 3D models. To her, even that act would be one of resistance". She is creating, through 3D modeling and printing, some of the artifacts destroyed by ISIS.

In early 2016, Allahyari published one of her reconstructions from Material Speculation: ISIS, as well as a dossier of her research, as part of Rhizome's series The Download. Through this commission, her object file for King Uthal was made openly available to anyone for 3D printing. She collaborated with Browntourage to create a virtual tour of 3D prints from the Material Speculation series, PRINT your REALITY. Users touring the virtual gallery may examine the 3D images by rotating them and watching the artist answer questions about her work.

This body of work received attention from current news outlets such as Vice's Creators Project, Vice's Motherboard, AJ+, CBC, Huffington Post, New York Times, and Wired among many others.

=== The 3D Additivist Manifesto and Cookbook (2016) ===
The 3D Additivist Cookbook, co-devised and edited with Daniel Rourke is a free 3D PDF compendium of imaginative, provocative works from over 100 world-leading “artists, designers, curators, students, activists, and theorists. Released in December 2016, the works in the Cookbook are a coalescence of recipes, fiction, critical essays, .obj and .stl files, toolkits, templates, blueprints, and methodologies.

Before the release of the Cookbook, Allahyari and Rourke released the 3D Additivist Manifesto in March 2015 as a call to push the 3D printer and other creative technologies to their absolute limits and beyond the realm of the speculative. The Manifesto contains a call to action with 16 points of intended mobilizations for the revolution. The 3D Additivist Cookbook responded to the Manifesto’s call for Creation as a violent assault on the forces of matter. Allahyari & Rourke’s aim for the Cookbook is not only the expansion of the limits of the 3D printer but to also the extraction of the raw potential of its machinery.

A portmanteau of additive and activism, #Additivism is a conflation that defines a movement intent on disrupting material, social, computational, and metaphysical realities through provocation, collaboration and science-fictional thinking.

== Residencies, recognition, and awards ==
- Resident at Gray Area Art and Technology, San Francisco, CA (2014)
- Resident at The Frank-Ratchye STUDIO for Creative Inquiry, Carnegie Mellon University, (2015)
- Resident with AUTODESK’s Pier9 Art Program (3D printing + sculpture), (2015)
- Recipient of Vilém Flusser Residency Program for Artistic Research in association with Transmediale, an annual award through the Transmediale festival for art and digital culture in the German capital. (2016)
- Recipient of the Leading Global Thinkers of 2016 award by Foreign Policy Magazine (2016)
- Research fellowship at Eyebeam for "She Who Sees The Unknown", centered on digital colonialism and Re-Figuring of dark goddesses, female Jinns, and monstrous figures of ancient Near East. (2016-2017)
- Digital Sculpture Award, The Institute of Digital Art, Germany (2016)
- Sundance Institute New Frontier International Fellowship (2019)
- The Joan Mitchell Foundation Painters & Sculptors Grant (2019)
- The United States Artist Fellowship, 2021
- The UC President's Postdoctoral Fellowship Program, University of California, Berkeley, 2024.
- Creative Capital Award, 2025.
