= Haupt Collection =

Thematic Berlin-based collection of contemporary art curated by Stefan Haupt

The Haupt Collection entitled "Thirty Pieces of Silver — Art and Money" is a thematic Berlin-based collection of contemporary art curated by Stefan Haupt. The collection is dedicated to the topic of money all media. It is shown in rotating exhibitions in both national museums and art galleries, as well as by appointment in the space of Haupt's Law Firm.

== Formation ==
Initially dedicated to the photographic medium, Haupt shifted his focus to money art in the mid-'90s, inspired by an origami sculpture by New York-based Taiwanese artist Lee Mingwei. In the following years, this inspiration developed through visits to art fairs and galleries, as well as Internet research.

For art collector Stefan Haupt, the fascination with money is that — besides sex and death — it is a phenomenon about which we do not speak although it is one of the determining factors of human existence.

— Uta Tackenberg

== Range ==
The collection comprises some 200 works in varying techniques and approaches that provide an overview of the study of money in contemporary art. Significant works in the collection, among others, are the work $ by the French light artist Mathieu Mercier, "Hidden Object III" by Timm Ulrichs and several works by Joseph Beuys.

Also represented in the collection (selected):

- César Escudero Andaluz
- Stephan Balkenhol
- Thomas Baumgärtel
- Barton Lidicé Beneš
- Joseph Beuys
- JSG Boogs
- Anne de Vries
- Ruprecht Dreher
- Felix Droese
- Nikolaus Eberstaller
- Agathe Fleury
- Fabian Fontain
- Thorsten Goldberg
- Jan Henderikse
- Julia Herfurth
- Norbert Hinterberger
- Ottmar Hörl
- Friedensreich Hundertwasser
- Robert Jelinek
- Anne Jud
- Christin Lahr
- Lee Mingwei
- Mathieu Mercier
- Wolfgang Nieblich
- Jochen Schamal
- Sebastian Siechold
- Daniel Spoerri
- Klaus Staeck
- Michael Timpson
- Timm Ulrichs
- Philipp Valenta
- Andreas von Weizsäcker
- Lawrence Weiner
- Stefan Wewerka
- Vadim Zakharov

== Exhibitions (selected) ==
- "Art and Money — Collection Haupt", Exhibition at the Halle am Wasser, Kunst-Campus Berlin at the Hamburger Train Station, 10. September to October 8, 2011
- "Thirty Pieces of Silver – Art and Money" — Collection Haupt – Altmärkisches Museum Stendal, May 20 September 2, 2012
- "Real or Fake? An Exhibition about Money and its Counterfeits", Works from the Haupt Collection at the Museum of the Printing Arts Leipzig, October 14 to December 7, 2012
- "MONEY, MONEY, MONEY" – Exhibition of the Haupt Collection at the Kunstforum Halle, August 20 to September 15, 2013
- "DIVIDED AND REUNIFIED", selected works from the Haupt Collection, curated by Tina Sauerländer, satellite program of Art Market Budapest 2014, A38, Budapest, Hungary

== Literature ==
- Haupt Collection, Thirty Pieces of Silver – Art and Money, Hermann Büchner and Tina Sauerländer, Braus, 2013 – ISBN 978-3-86228-086-5
