= Pola Sieverding =

German photographer and video artist

Pola Sieverding (born 1981) is a German photographer and video artist. She works in the field of lens based media.

== Education ==
Sieverding graduated in 2007 with an MFA from the Berlin University of the Arts where she studied under Stan Douglas, Ellen Cantor, Dieter Appelt, Sabeth Buchmann, and Katja Diefenbach. In 2002, she attended the Carnegie Mellon University in Pittsburgh, Pennsylvania and in 2005 the Surikov Art Institute in Moscow.

== Work ==
The artist's work questions traditional concepts of gender, culture, and normality; capturing both specific social spaces and the unique people who live in them. Sieverding's work primarily analyses the relationship between her subjects- individuals who range from women in traditional Islamic dress to drag queens, performance actors and the Berlin club scene- to their bodies. In recent years the artist has added to her work the depiction of equally unique architecture which is portrayed as means of being a specific social space. Continuously throughout the artist's work, materiality plays a significant role: be it elements of concrete and glass in Close to Concrete I and II, hair in To The Crowned And Conquering Child or textiles as in the photo series Text I-VI. In cooperation with Orson Sieverding, the artist develops electronic soundscapes for her installations which when projected onto her protagonists transform into urban echoes.

2019 the artist, who also works as a curator, joined the team to help set up the art festival Düsseldorf Photo Plus. She became one of the artistic directors in 2020, 2022 and 2022, creating exhibitions, film programs, and symposia.

== Grants ==
Sieverding has won an art grant from the Senate of Berlin twice, in 2008 and 2014. In 2011 Sieverding was invited as an artist in residence at the Meet Factory in Prague, the Maumaus in Lisbon, and as a visiting lecturer at the International Art Academy in Ramallah, Palestine where she received an art grant from the Anna Lindh Foundation. Today the artist resides and works in Berlin.

== Major solo exhibitions ==
- 2018/2019: "Bodies that matter", knustxkunz+, München
- 2018: "Gustav Peichl - 15 Bauten zum 90sten", MAK – Österreichisches Museum für angewandte Kunst / Gegenwartskunst, Wien
- 2016: "THE EPIC", NAK Neuer Aachener Kunstverein, Aachen
- 2015: "ARENA", at Anna Jill Lüpertz Gallery, Berlin
- 2014: "GRANDS ENSEMBLES" at BOX21 Freiraum für Kultur, Berlin
- 2012: "CROSS METROPOLIS MACHINE/CLOSE TO CONCRETE" at BRAENNEN, Berlin
- 2012 "CROSS METROPOLIS MACHINE" at Galerie Kostka, Prague
- 2011: "CLOSE TO CONCRETE" at Lumiar Cité, Lisbon
- 2010: "Never mind about the six feet, let's talk about the seven inches" at Galerie Lena Brüning, Berlin
- 2010: "RHIZOMA" at TÄT, Berlin
- 2009/2010: "Figures of Affect" Friederike Hamann and Pola Sieverding, Galerie Campagne Première, Berlin
- 2009: "Cadavre Exquis" at Galerie Lena Brüning, Berlin

== Major group exhibitions ==
- 2016: "Von den Strömen der Stadt", Museum Abteiberg, Mönhengladbach
- 2016: "The Self. Perception – Profession – Portrait", Dubai Photo Exhibition, Dubai kuratiert von Frank Wagner und Zelda Cheatle
- 2014: "LOVE AIDS RIOT SEX 2" at Neue Gesellschaft für Bildende Kunst, Berlin
- 2014: "Blended Generations" at 701 e.V., Düsseldorf 2014
- 2014: "The Undulation of Something Faintly Familiar" at Anat Ebgi Gallery, Los Angeles
- 2013: "BERLIN.STATUS [2]" at Künstlerhaus Bethanien, Berlin
- 2013: "040 Festival für Fotografie in der Gegenwartskunst – Destroyed Images" at Frappant, Hamburg
- 2012: "Hyperrealz" at Bruno Glint, London
- 2011: "Hot Spot Berlin" at Georg Kolbe Museum, Berlin
- 2011: "Alive She Cried" curated by Reynold Reynolds at Galerie Zink, Berlin
- 2010: "Künstler der Galerie III" at Galerie Lena Brüning, Berlin
- 2010: "Six Days of New Media" at Linienstraße 127, Berlin
- 2010: "No more daughters and heroes" at Aram Art Gallery, Goyang Cultural Foundation, Seoul
- 2009: "Künstler der Galerie II" at Galerie Lena Brüning, Berlin
- 2007: "Hardcore Glamour" at Kunstraum Kreuzberg/ Bethanien, Berlin

== Major collaborations and performances ==
- 2014: "Kunsthalle Bühne: Das Fest! VERSION featuring ORSON&POLA", Orson Sieverding and Pola Sieverding at Kunstverein, Düsseldorf
- 2012: " https://web.archive.org/web/20141219114212/http://pfad.d13.documenta.de/ " Natascha Sadr Haghighian collaborating with Pola Sieverding at dOCUMENTA (13), Kassel

== Publications ==
- 2018: THE EPIC, Hrsg. NAK Neuer Aachener Kunstverein, Verlag Hatje Cantz
- 2016: Berlin Raum Radar edited by Nadine Barth, Verlag Hatje Cantz
- 2016: Dubai Photo Exhibition, edited by Zelda Cheatle
- 2015: trail, edited by Natascha Sadr Haghighian, Pola Sieverding, Jasper Kettner; Schriftenreihe des documenta Archivs. Verlag Spector Books, Leipzig
- 2015: History is a Warm Gun, edited by Britta Schmitz, n.b.k. Berlin, Verlag Walter König
- 2015: ARENA, exhibition catalogue by Anna Jill Lüpertz Gallery, Berlin
- 2014: LOVE AIDS RIOT SEX, edited by Frank Wagner, nGbK, Berlin
- 2013: Artists for Revival – Rehberger, Morris, Brandenburg, Sieverding, Bonvicini, Yalcindag, Schulze, Sweeny, Zipp, Nickolson, edited by Schiesser
- 2013: Berlin.Status(2) – 50 Positionen junger Künstler und Künstlerinnen aus Berlin, edited by Sven Drühl, Christoph Tannert, Künstlerhaus Bethanien
- 2012: https://web.archive.org/web/20141219114212/http://pfad.d13.documenta.de/, Natascha Sadr Haghighian & Pola Sieverding at dOCUMENTA (13)
- 2010: Never Mind About The Six Feet. Let's Talk About The Seven Inches, exhibition catalogue by Galeria Lena Brüning, Berlin
- 2010: TEXT Revue, edited by Andrea van Dühren, Berlin
- 2009: WOUND: Creative Culture Close Up, Pola Sieverding: Now Objectivity by Ken Pratt, London, UK, Fall Issue
- 2008: Spex, Nr. 312, White Cube Ambition-Junge Berliner Künstler, Liebling Nr. 05, Special Issue
- 2004: Klinik unter Palmen-Statements aus der Kunstakademie, in Texte zur Kunst "Erziehung" Issue 53
