= Lorna Mills =

Canadian net.art and new media artist

- Born: Yorkton, Saskatchewan, Canada
- Education: University of Toronto
- Known for: new media artist

Lorna Mills is a Canadian net.art and new media artist who is known for her digital animations, videos, and GIFs. Mills has done work in other mediums such as installations. Her work explores how "the notion of public decency is anachronistic" Her use of GIFs are gathered through the dark net which includes 4chan, pornfails, and Russian domains. She currently lives and works in Toronto, Canada.

== Early life ==
Lorna Mills was born in Yorkton, Saskatchewan. From 1993–1994, she studied Digital Media Studies at the Information Technology Design Center at the University of Toronto. Before doing digital works, she worked with analog with Super 8 film, video, painting and photography. Mills is self-taught in programming and video editing. Her previous occupations include waitressing, children's game programmer. And is currently doing video editing for IPTV and tablet delivery. As a child, Mills would flip through novels quickly unable to retain the majority of the novel. This way of thinking or working has remained with Mills since then and has reflected in the content she creates. This is apparent through her often choppy and partial looking GIF work collages.

== Career ==
In 1990, Mills was a founding member of the Red Head Gallery, an artist-run gallery, in Toronto. Around this time also, Mills began her career in solo and group exhibitions. Her work traditionally consists of four obsessive media such as; Cibachrome printing, painting, super 8 film and more newly, digital video animations combined in installation work.

In 1994, Mills began working as a game programmer for children's CD-ROMs and then for web programs. At the same time, she began making digital animations. In an interview with Triangulation, Mills talked about how around the time she started designing children's games and web programs, she started her GIF animations. She emphasized on how most of her animations were interactive, but did not stimulate much interest to her during this part of her career. From 1998 to 2005, she began making her animations, by 2005, she had grown more interest into the video looping aspect. Earlier in her career, Mills met artist, writer and curator, Sally McKay. McKay asked Mills to join and post on her blog called Digital Media Tree. From this collaboration Mills realized there was opportunity for her to make her own graphics.

In 2013, her GIFs were projected at the Art Gallery of Ontario as a part of the David Bowie exhibition, David Bowie Is.... This exhibition showcased her reputation as one of Toronto's most experienced media artists. She also co-curated a GIF exhibition with Anthony Antonellis in Berlin titled When Analog Was Periodical. Mills mentions in an article with CanadianArt, that Antonellis had done a series of lenticular prints several years before. This series had heightened her interest in collecting them to creating her own lenticular print based GIF. Due to her interest in this process, she began to work with a company called GifPop in Brooklyn. They helped her develop her lenticular images, that soon became successful and visually appealing.

In 2014, Mills was also selected to curate a "pavilion" as a part of the Wrong Biennial, an online net-art biennial. She also curated a video series, entitled Ways of Something, based on art historian John Berger's 1971 documentary Ways of Seeing. For this video, Mills invited thirty different web-based artists per episode to create a single minute of footage about their contemporary practice.

She also participated in The House in the Sky exhibition at the Hayward Gallery in London.

Mills often refers to her art process as "obsessive". She has stated that this is due to the fact that internet art like hers that can be based on images that she finds from surfing on the web can encourage lengthy production.

In 2016, Mills was the keynote speaker at the Pratt Institute's Pratt Upload (2016) patterns of the Mind.

In March 2016, Mills presented Mountain Light/Time in Times Square, NYC as part of the Midnight Moment Project.

Mills is represented by TRANSFER in Brooklyn, New York and DAM Gallery in Berlin.

In 2024, Lorna Mills work is included in the group exhibition Sea Change at the Pérez Art Museum Miami, Florida. The show is an exploration on the impacts of and alternatives to the global environmental crisis through time-based media and internet art.

== Style and work ==
Mill's work portrays vulgar imagery that relates to contemporary living such as daily routines, stress and modern human behaviours. Her choice of images come from sources like Reddit, Google+, Porn Fail and Russian sites. Mill's says in her interview with CanadianArt, that she is drawn to "free internet filth, inter-species romance, masturbating penguins and people wanking with plastic dolphins". The style of her work breaks the boundaries of aesthetics from professionalized internet and traditional art institutes. Mills work shows intensity not just through the rapid pace of images, but also the strange system in which they moved. Mira Dayal of Hyperallergic has described Mills' work as "a nauseating version of the internet or a frantic Tumblr feed...there is motion everywhere on the screen, and one piece tends to bleed into another. The resulting sense of immediacy and chaos is disturbing, compelling, and at times amusing."

=== Ways of Something ===
"Ways of Something", is a collection of 1 minute videos compiled and curated by Mills and released in March 2015. Commissioned by The One Minutes, at the Sandberg Instituut in Amsterdam, it was a contemporary remake of John Berger's BBC documentary, "Ways of Seeing" (1972). The first episode consisted of one-minute videos by 113 web-based artists who commonly work with 3D rendering, gifs, film remix, webcam performances, and websites to describe the cacophonous conditions of artmaking after the internet. "Ways of Something" was created in four episodes. Each 1 minute frame has been closed captioned. Mills chose to do this in order to "magnify the discontinuity visually, yet also unite it." The resulting piece was collected and featured as part of the Whitney Museum's exhibition of video work, Dreamlands: Immersive Cinema and Art, 1905–2016.

=== At Play in The Fields of the Lord ===
This work explores topics pertaining to "contemporary living, including subcultures, daily routines, stress, and modern human behaviors." It was exhibited in the Brooklyn-based gallery Transfer Gallery and was her second solo show run by Kelani Nichole. The opening reception began at 7pm on October 3, 2015. The exhibition included a series of "looped visual animates" including past work and recent unseen pieces. The title of the show was taken from a book by Peter Matthiessen and was chosen to echo "the purposeful non-sense that aligns with the visual content of the show" This show for Mills was one she always wished to do at Transfer and finally having the right equipment she was able to do the show.

=== Abrupt Diplomat at Transmediale 2015 ===
Mills was invited to mount a solo show of then-new gif works at the Marshall McLuhan Salon in the Canadian Embassy in Berlin for Transmediale 2015. "The work of Lorna Mills forms patterns that defy progress and instead suspend the viewer in an endless retreat from the familiar.", writes festival director Kristoffer Gansing.

=== Sheroes #9: Dolly Parton ===
"Sheroes #9: Dolly Parton", is a curated piece Mills was a part of with artists such as Rea McNamara. It consisted of monthly limited-run performance series that played with media fandom. Sheroes was invented by McNamara and it took her some convincing to get Mills to program the projections of the animated GIF's. Mills was hesitant about doing this project due to the phrases "Sheroes" and "herstory". These were phrases from earlier feminists which made Mills uncomfortable. Originally the collaboration consisted of 6 artists for the first GIF projections, but due to the excitement of it, Mills had gathered more artists. Overall "Sheroes" crew consisted of multiple net.art artists

=== Echo, Rise, Repeat ===
"Echo, Rise, Repeat", is a piece that was exhibited at the Plug In Institute of Contemporary Art. This piece presented an endless rotation of animations that were installed in the gallery's elevator. The audience then would experience a slow ride that went to one of the four floors of the building, where they would encounter her GIF's being quickly repeated endlessly.

== Critical response ==
=== Canadian Art Foundation Features: Lorna Mills and Her Subversive GIF Art ===
Simon Lewson states Mills art as "exuberantly raunchy" during his interview with the artist in July 2015. He goes on to say that her work suggests "in a world of seemingly limitless porn, the notion of decency is anachronistic". Therefore, Mills finds it hilarious to exhibit digital art and sensor it at the same time.

=== Hyperallergic Interviews: "Everything I Do Has the Smell of Digital": Lorna Mills on Her Art ===
In Mira Dayal's interview with Mills, she states how scrolling through her website, "LornaMillsImageDump", was like experiencing a warped and nauseating version of the internet or Tumblr feed. She also mentions this is due to how Mills uses animations and GIFs in her work to create a constant motion all over the screen and how one piece tends to bleed into another.

== Process ==
When creating a new art work Mills begins to search certain websites for source material. The sites chosen are predominantly on the dark web and include; Reddit, 4chan, pornfails, and Russian domains. When searching the content, her choices tend to be "GIFs that are un-arty, made from real footage and, for the most part, disconnected from mainstream culture." The favourite subjects of Mills tend to be anything outlandish. Mills then removes the subjects she has chosen from their surrounding background frame by frame. The cuts are rough and tend to leave edges of the original background attached giving the images a "grainy, pulsating aura". She then collages her gathered imaged together using Adobe Flash Professional. When she puts the images together Mills aims to create a piece where the GIFs are moving independently but relate to one another.
