= Transfer (gallery) =

Art gallery in Brooklyn, New York

Coordinates: 40.714297°N 73.934915°W

TRANSFER
- Industry: Art gallery
- Founded: 2013
- Founder: Kelani Nichole
- Headquarters: Brooklyn, United States
- Website: transfergallery.com

Transfer (stylized as TRANSFER) is an art gallery that opened in Brooklyn, New York in 2013. Transfer moved to Los Angeles in June 2019, but then its physical location closed and the gallery pivoted to a virtual one.

== History ==
Transfer was co-founded by Kelani Nichole and Jereme Mongeon. Nichole, an independent curator, currently serves as the gallery's director.

Transfer was created to help online artists become more connected in a physical way. The gallery's objective is to allow online artists to literally "transfer" their art into a physical context using four blank walls. Given these walls, artists can revert to drawing, painting, sculpture, or photography to recreate their online work.

== Locations & Exhibitions ==
In 2016, the program TRANSFER Download started traveling nationally and throughout the world with presentations in cities such as Santa Fe, New Mexico, Miami, Florida, Los Angeles, California, and New York.
