= Buffalo International Film Festival =

Annual film festival in Buffalo, New York

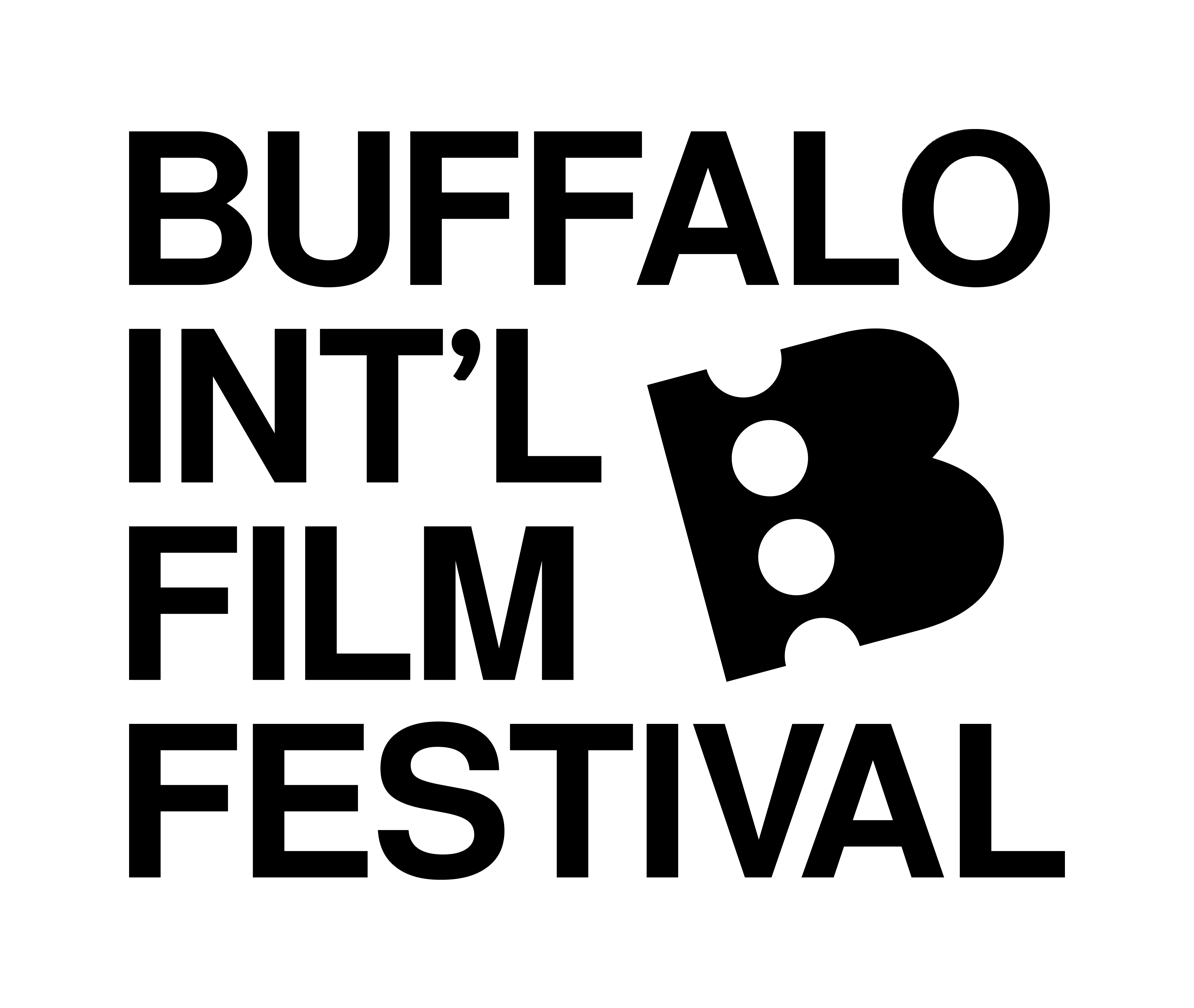
- Location: Buffalo, New York, U.S.
- Established: 2006; 20 years ago
- Founded by: Edward Summer
- Most recent: October 9-16, 2025
- Directors: Anna Scime (Executive); John J. Fink (Artistic)
- Festival date: October 8-15, 2026; 43 days from now
- Website: www.buffalofilm.org

The Buffalo International Film Festival (BIFF) is an annual film festival held in Buffalo, New York. The festival takes place in October at multiple venues throughout the city of Buffalo. It is also known as the Buffalo Film Festival.

The weeklong festival screens over 200 films each year from more than 30 countries. The festival jury awards filmmakers in both international and domestic categories, with additional awards for films made in Western New York.

== History ==
The Buffalo International Film Festival was founded in 2006 by Edward Summer. It is a 501(c)(3) nonprofit organization.

Early BIFF activities were focused on film history in the Western New York region. In 2007, Summer uncovered evidence of the 1896 opening of a Vitascope theater within Edisonia Hall in Buffalo's Ellicott Square Building. He proposed that this was the first purpose-built movie theater in the world. For several years following the discovery, BIFF hosted a birthday party on the anniversary of the theater's original opening.

In 2007, BIFF made Buffalo the first city in the world to declare UNESCO World Day for Audio-Visual Heritage.

Edward Summer also founded the Buffalo Film Society to support additional year-round programming. The festival and film society co-presented the 2008 Harold Lloyd Comedy Film Festival at the Riviera Theatre. The event featured performances by Robert Israel and Clark Wilson on the Mighty Wurlitzer theatre organ.

Following Summer’s death in 2014, Raymond Guarnieri became the new Executive Director. The 2015 festival brought about several changes including the introduction of a judging panel for awards. The programming focus in this era shifted to premiering new work rather than the classic films and retrospectives favored by Summer. Films premiered at Squeaky Wheel Buffalo Media Arts Center, The Screening Room, and the newly restored North Park Theatre. For BIFF’s 10th edition in 2016, the festival was held exclusively at venues within the city of Buffalo, including Hallwalls.

The 2020 festival shifted to a hybrid format due to the COVID-19 pandemic. Films and Q&As were screened virtually with select events taking place at the Dark Alley Drive-In, a pop-up outdoor cinema.

BIFF also features live music, performance, and new media installations through its BIFF Offscreen series. Offscreen has featured work by Barbara Hammer, Tony Conrad, The Yes Men, and Steina and Woody Vasulka.

== Board ==
Current board members include: Tammy McGovern (Chair), Paige Sarlin (Vice Chair), Keith Poplawski (Secretary), Meg Knowles (Treasurer), Michael Faust (Member), LeRoi Johnson (Member), Annette Daniels Taylor (Member), and Renee Russell (Emeritus), Renée M. Saracki (Emeritus).

Previous board advisors have included: Tom Fontana, Lauren Belfer, Lawrence Block, A.R. Gurney, Nancy Kress, Herbert Hauptman, Jim Steranko, Howard Bloom, Edward Summer, Lloyd Kaufman, David Shire, Mort Walker, Bill Prady and others.

== Staff ==
Staff members include: Anna Scime (Executive Director), John J. Fink (Artistic Director), Ana Grujić (Marketing + Outreach Coordinator), Myari Ware (Platform Strategist), Elizabeth Dunning (ASI Springboard Fellow).

== Awards and screenings ==
=== Early Years ===
The inaugural festival was June 13, 2007 and included "Student Films Across America."

In 2008, it screened more than 25 films including regional and national premieres. These screenings included a Harold Lloyd Film Retrospective (with personal appearance by Suzanne Lloyd) and "Hollywood 39" a retrospective of great Hollywood movies from 1939.

In 2009, BIFF held a Spring Gala and Fall Festival. The Spring Gala was a celebration of Walt Disney and Mickey Mouse arranged through The Walt Disney Company. The festival that year ran from October 9–27, 2009 and included 18 films from all over the world and 16 guests who presented them including Abigail Disney, Rick Schmidlin, Charles Band, Dwayne Buckle, David Heeley, Ray Bradbury, J.B. Kaufman, Mary Pat Kelly

BIFF 2009 included the First Annual Al Boasberg Comedy Award given in honor of famed comedy writer Al Boasberg, who was born in Buffalo.

- Al Boasberg Comedy Award—Lifetime Achievement in Comedy Writing - Larry Gelbart
- Al Boasberg Comedy Award—Lifetime Achievement in Comedy Writing - Joseph Stein
- Al Boasberg Comedy Award—Lifetime Achievement in Comedy Writing - Everett Greenbaum
- Al Boasberg Comedy Award—Lifetime Achievement in Comedy Performance - Kathleen Howard
- Al Boasberg Comedy Award—Lifetime Achievement in Comedy Art and Writing - Harvey Kurtzman

=== Festival Awards ===
The Buffalo International Film Festival began awarding films in 2011. These awards were all audience-voted until the introduction of juried award categories in 2015. The jury's top prize was originally called the Gold Bison, but this name was later retired. There is still a single Audience Award that is decided by festival attendees.

The festival staff selects additional special awards like the BIFF Boundary Breaker Award, issued to a groundbreaking work, and the BIFF Lifetime Achievement Award, which celebrates a person from Buffalo who has made significant contributions to the film industry. The Lifetime Achievement award is paired with a Legacy Gala screening during the festival.

BIFF Lifetime Achievement Award
Year	Recipient	Legacy Gala Screening
2024	David L. Snyder	Demolition Man
2025	Stephen McKinley Henderson	Everyday People

Audience Awards 2011-2014
Year	Category	Rank	Film or Recipient	Director(s)
2011	Animation	First Place	Flatland	Ladd Ehlinger Jr.
2011	Best of Festival	First Place	Cape No. 7	Wei Te-sheng
2011	Best of Festival	First Place	The Whisperer in Darkness	Sean Branney
2011	Best of Festival	Honorable Mention	Cultures of Resistance	Iara Lee
2011	Comedy	First Place	Gallants	Derek Kwok, Clement Cheng, and David M. Rosenthal
2011	Comedy	Second Place	Romantics Anonymous	Jean-Pierre Améris
2011	Documentary Film	First Place	If a Tree Falls: A Story of the Earth Liberation Front	Marshall Curry, David M. Rosenthal, and Jean-Pierre Améris
2011	Documentary Film	Second Place	Cultures of Resistance	Iara Lee, David M. Rosenthal, and Jean-Pierre Améris
2011	Documentary Film	Honorable Mention	Kumpania	Katina Dunn
2011	Drama	First Place	Shock Corridor	Samuel Fuller and Jean-Pierre Améris
2011	Drama	Second Place	Essential Killing	Jerzy Skolimowski and Jean-Pierre Améris
2011	Drama	Third Place	Janie Jones	David M. Rosenthal
2011	Foreign Language Film	First Place	Cape No. 7	Wei Te-sheng
2011	Foreign Language Film	Second Place	Orz Boyz	Yang Ya-che
2011	Foreign Language Film	Honorable Mention	Gallants	Derek Kwok, Clement Cheng, and David M. Rosenthal
2011	Foreign Language Film	Honorable Mention	Romantics, Anonymous	Jean-Pierre Améris
2011	Horror/Science Fiction	First Place	The Whisperer in Darkness	Sean Branney
2011	Horror/Science Fiction	Second Place	House on Haunted Hill	William Castle
2011	Horror/Science Fiction	Honorable Mention	Black Eve	Ryan M. Andrews
2011	Samuel Fuller Guerrilla Filmmaking Award	First Place	Atwill	Charles Dennis
2011	Special Event	First Place	Meet the Pros: Filmmaking Workshop with David Heely and Joan Kramer	
2012	Animation	First Place	My Neighbor Totoro	Hayao Miyazaki
2012	Best of Buffalo - Feature Film	First Place	Zeus	Jeremy Hurlburt
2012	Best of Buffalo - Short Film	First Place	Take it Off	Anna Van Valin
2012	Best of Buffalo - Short Film	Second Place	Viral Video	Jenn Dlugos
2012	Best of Buffalo - Short Film	Honorable Mention	Feeble Attraction	Brandyn Betz
2012	Best of Buffalo - Short Film	Honorable Mention	Exit 7A	William Peters
2012	Best of Festival	First Place	Ray Harryhausen: Special Effects Titan	Gilles Penso
2012	Best of Festival	First Place	Starry, Starry Night	Tom Lin
2012	Documentary	First Place	Ray Harryhausen: Special Effects Titan	Gilles Penso
2012	Documentary	Second Place	Somewhere Between	Linda Goldstein Knowlton
2012	Documentary	Third Place	Alive Inside (work-in-progress)	Michael Rossato-Bennett
2012	Drama	First Place	Starry, Starry Night	Tom Lin
2012	Drama	Second Place	Extraterrestrial	Nacho Vigalondo
2012	Drama	Third Place	A Case of Deceit	
2012	Foreign Language Film	First Place	Starry, Starry Night	Tom Lin
2012	Foreign Language Film	Second Place	Extraterrestrial	Nacho Vigalondo
2012	Science Fiction	First Place	Extraterrestrial	Nacho Vigalondo
2012	Short Film - International	First Place	Behind the Concrete	Simon Stunt
2013	Best Documentary	First Place	Persistence of Vision	Kevin Schreck
2013	Best Documentary	Second Place	Magic Camp	Judd Ehrlich
2013	Best Documentary	Third Place	Dear Mr. Watterson	Joel Allen Schroeder
2013	Best Feature Film	First Place	Les aventures extraordinaires d’Adèle Blanc-Sec	Luc Besson
2013	Best Feature Film	Second Place	The Thief and the Cobbler – Recobbled Cut	Garrett Gilchrist
2013	Best Feature Film	Third Place	Red Light Revolution	Sam Voutas
2013	Best Made in Buffalo Documentaries	First Place	Long Live TOY	Austin McLoughlin and Mary Elizabeth Murray
2013	Best Made in Buffalo Documentaries	Second Place	The Long Bike Back	Julia Wrona
2013	Best Made in Buffalo Documentaries	Third Place	Ming Day and Night	Diedie Weng
2013	Best Made in Buffalo Documentaries	Third Place	East Side: A Community of Hope	Erik Taheri and Rich Lunghino
2013	Best Made in Buffalo Documentaries	Third Place	Where the Crow Will be Forever	Ashley Fike and Lauren Mosier
2013	Best Made in Buffalo Features	First Place	Buffalo Boys	Ray Guarnieri
2013	Best Made in Buffalo Features	Second Place	Brandonwood	John Fink
2013	Best of Festival	First Place	Persistence of Vision	Kevin Schreck
2013	Best of Festival	Second Place	Les aventures extraordinaires d’Adèle Blanc-Sec	Luc Besson
2013	Best of Festival	Third Place	Company	
2013	Best of Made in Buffalo	First Place	Long Live TOY	Austin McLoughlin and Mary Elizabeth Murray
2013	Special Award	First Place	She	Charlene Amoia
2014	There were no awards in 2014 due to the death of founder Edward Summer.			

Gold Bison and Jury Prizes 2015-2020
Year	Category	Rank	Film or Recipient	Director(s)
2015	Audience Award	Gold Bison	...In The Dark	David Spaltro
2015	Feature Documentary	Gold Bison	A Courtship	Amy Kohn
2015	Feature Documentary	Special Jury Prize	Aspie Seeks Love	Julie Sokolow
2015	Feature Narrative	Gold Bison	Oblivion Season	Abbas Rafei
2015	Feature Narrative	Special Jury Prize	Abby Singer/Songwriter	Onur Tukel
2015	Short Film	Gold Bison	I Scream Your Name	Oskar Rosetti
2015	Short Film	Special Jury Prize	Royal Women’s Association	Robinder Uppal
2015	Supersnipe Award	Gold Bison	Detectives of Noir Town	Andrew Chambers
2015	WNY Feature	Gold Bison	Emelie	Michael Thelin
2015	WNY Feature	Special Jury Prize	Prescient	Zi R. Lem
2015	WNY Short	Gold Bison	Long John	
2015	WNY Short	Special Jury Prize	Aleatories From an Echo	
2015	WNY Student Film	Gold Bison	Mer Depre	
2015	WNY Student Film	Special Jury Prize	Locomotion	Sam Avery
2016	Audience Award	Gold Bison	Gold Star	Victoria Negri
2016	Feature Documentary	Gold Bison	Tony Conrad: Completely in the Present	Tyler Hubby
2016	Feature Documentary	Special Jury Prize	Tower	Keith Maitland
2016	Feature Documentary	Special Jury Prize	Off the Rails	Adam Irving
2016	Feature Narrative	Gold Bison	Lovesong	So Yong Kim
2016	Feature Narrative	Special Jury Prize	Out of Innocence	Danny Hiller
2016	Short Film	Gold Bison	Meeting between two Parked Cars	Anna Linke
2016	Short Film	Special Jury Prize	The End of Blessings	John Rice
2016	Supersnipe Award	Gold Bison	Circuit Sizzle	
2016	WNY Feature	Gold Bison	Trew Calling	Greg Robbins
2016	WNY Feature	Special Jury Prize	2307: Winter’s Dream	Joey Curtis
2016	WNY Short	Gold Bison	The New Canada	Alexander Carson
2016	WNY Short	Special Jury Prize	They Kill Things	Kyle Marler
2016	WNY Student Film	Gold Bison	Beyond the Sea	Vince DiVirgilio
2016	WNY Student Film	Special Jury Prize	That’s my Baby	Marissa Brannick
2018	Audience Award	Gold Bison	The Guardians	Billie Mintz
2018	Best Episodic Project	Gold Bison	Coming Together	
2018	BIFF Boundary Breaker	Gold Bison	Annette Daniels Taylor	
2018	Domestic Narrative Feature	Gold Bison	Friday's Child	A.J. Edwards
2018	Feature - Documentary	Gold Bison	Dawnland	Adam Mazo and Ben Pender-Cudlip
2018	International Feature Film	Gold Bison	Octav	Serge Ioan Celebidachi
2018	Short Film	Gold Bison	Fragments 83	Corentin Koskas and Richard Millen
2018	Student Short	Gold Bison	By Day and Again	Hunter Whaley
2018	Supersnipe Animation Award	Gold Bison	Pitigua	Paula Martinez Cirilo
2018	WNY Feature Film	Gold Bison	Rainbow Bridge Motel	Scott Rubin and J. Garrett Vorreuter
2019	Audience Award	Gold Bison	The Fan Connection (Buffalo Sabres Fan Documentary)	Mary Wall
2019	Best Documentary Feature	Gold Bison	The Condor & The Eagle	Sophie Guerra and Clement Guerra
2019	Best Episodic	Gold Bison	Fakers	Ryan DeNardo
2019	Best Narrative Feature	Gold Bison	Online Billie	Lou Assous
2019	Best Short Film	Gold Bison	Piu Più	Naima Ramos-Chapman
2019	Best Short Subject Documentary	Gold Bison	Haven	Colin Askey
2019	Best Student Film	Gold Bison	I Am A Feminist	Dahee Yun
2019	Best WNY Feature	Gold Bison	A Woman's Work: The NFL's Cheerleader Problem	Yu Gu
2019	Best WNY Short	Gold Bison	"A" My Name Is	Sarah T Schwab
2019	Supersnipe Animation Award	Gold Bison	Ringworm	Kali Croisdale
2020	Audience Award	Grand Jury Prize	Marcus	J.R. Poli
2020	Best Documentary	Grand Jury Prize	The Last Out	Michael Gassert and Sami Khan
2020	Best Episode	Grand Jury Prize	Public Writer - Season 3	Eric Piccoli
2020	Best Narrative Feature	Grand Jury Prize	Toprak	Sevgi Hirschhauser
2020	Best Short Film	Grand Jury Prize	Dear Georgina	Adam Mazo and Ben Pender-Cudlip
2020	Best Student Film	Grand Jury Prize	Euthanasia	Jade Edwards
2020	Best WNY Feature	Grand Jury Prize	United We Sing	Dan Petracca
2020	Best WNY Short	Grand Jury Prize	Enid and Mami	Julia Reagan
2020	BIFF Boundary Breaker Award	Grand Jury Prize	Chet Pancake	
2020	Ed Summer Supersnipe Animation	Grand Jury Prize	To Love Your Blackness is a Revolutionary Act	Jason “JaFleu” Fleurant

BIFF Awards 2021-2025
Year	Category	Rank	Film or Recipient	Director(s)
2021	Audience Award	Winner	100 Years From Mississippi	Tarabu Betserai Kirkland
2021	Best Animated Film	Winner	Nuevo Rico	Kristian Mercado
2021	Best Documentary Feature Film	Winner	Workhorse Queen	Angela Washko
2021	Best Documentary Short	Winner	Ancient Sunshine	Jason Livingston
2021	Best Episodic	Winner	Cary in Retrograde	Phillip Yaw Domfeh
2021	Best Narrative Feature Film	Winner	Beans	Tracey Deer
2021	Best Narrative Short	Winner	Feeling Through	Doug Roland
2021	Best WNY Feature	Winner	Catch the Fair One	Josef Kubota Wladyka
2021	Best WNY Short	Winner	Be Good, Make Me Proud: The Honorable Author O Eve and the Education Opportunity Program	
2021	Best WNY Student Film	Winner	Bond	Simon Yahn
2021	BIFF Boundary Breaker	Winner	We Burn Like This	Alana Waksman
2021	BIFF Boundary Breaker	Winner	This Bank of the River	Shoaib Sultan
2022	Audience Award	Winner	Lovely Jackson	Matt Waldeck
2022	Best Animated Film	Winner	Lock the Gate	Sarah Lynn Galasso
2022	Best Documentary Feature	Winner	Terrible Children	Shanti Thakur
2022	Best Documentary Short	Winner	Winter 1984	Tony Buba
2022	Best Episodic Project	Winner	Mashed	Stacey Maltin
2022	Best Narrative Feature	Winner	Relative	Michael Glover Smith
2022	Best Narrative Short	Winner	Colony Collapse Disorder	Amos Hozman
2022	Best WNY Feature	Winner	Bunker	Adrian Langley
2022	Best WNY Short	Winner	“I’ll Find a Way or Make One” — A Rosie Story	Rebecca Fasanello and Teresa Castillo
2022	Best WNY Student Film	Winner	Falling Up	Davis Cameron Chu
2022	BIFF Boundary Breaker	Winner	Bashira	Nickson Fong
2022	BIFF Boundary Breaker	Winner	A Rising Fury	Lesya Kalynska and Ruslan Batytskyi
2022	Special Jury Prize	Winner	The Rules of Lacrosse	Joanne Storkan
2022	Tilke Hill W.I.P. Award	Winner	This Is Not a Pipe Dream	Diane Jones
2023	Audience Award	Winner	If You Were the Last	Kristian Mercado
2023	Best Animated Film	Winner	Not So Ordinary	
2023	Best Documentary Feature (Domestic)	Winner	A Thousand Pines	Sebastian Diaz Aguirre and Noam Osband
2023	Best Documentary Feature (Global)	Winner	Aurora’s Sunrise	Inna Sahakyan
2023	Best Documentary Short (Domestic)	Winner	Blue Room	Merete Mueller
2023	Best Documentary Short (Global)	Winner	Istén:'a	K.J. Edwards
2023	Best Episodic	Winner	Nanny	
2023	Best Experimental Film	Winner	Maria Schneider, 1983	Elisabeth Subrin
2023	Best Narrative Feature (Domestic)	Winner	Fancy Dance	Erica Tremblay
2023	Best Narrative Feature (Global)	Winner	Alien Food	Giorgio Cugno
2023	Best Narrative Short (Domestic)	Winner	Gone Before Your Eyes	Cara Yeates
2023	Best Narrative Short (Global)	Winner	The Old Young Crow	Liam LoPinto
2023	Best WNY Feature	Winner	98 Degrees West - Zamir Discovers Bourdain’s America	Stephen R. Powell
2023	Best WNY Short	Winner	The Cookbook	Pedro Chaves
2023	Best WNY Student Film	Winner	Life in Boxes	Tayton Troidl
2023	Biff Boundary Breaker (Feature)	Winner	Only The Good Survive	Dutch Southern
2023	BIFF Boundary Breaker (Short)	Winner	Boiling Over	Paulo Miranda
2023	Tilke Hill W.I.P. Award	Winner	Meredith Vivian	
2024	Audience Award - Documentary	Winner	Songs from the Hole	Contessa Gayles
2024	Audience Award - Narrative	Winner	Skeet	Nik Sexton
2024	Best Animated Film	Winner	Birds of a Feather	Katie Cobos
2024	Best Documentary Feature (Domestic)	Winner	Demon Mineral	Hadley Austin
2024	Best Documentary Feature (Global)	Winner	A Picture to Remember	Olga Chernykh
2024	Best Documentary Short (Domestic)	Winner	How to Sue the Klan	John Beder
2024	Best Documentary Short (Global)	Winner	Enchukunoto / The Return	Laissa Malih
2024	Best Episodic	Winner	Cinching Saddles	
2024	Best Experimental Film	Winner	Adidas Owns Reality	Keil Troisi and Igor Vamos
2024	Best Narrative Feature (Domestic)	Winner	Tallywacker	Brendan Boogie
2024	Best Narrative Feature (Global)	Winner	Just a Farmer	Simon Lyndon
2024	Best Narrative Short (Domestic)	Winner	Hello, Goodbye	Chris Lee
2024	Best Narrative Short (Global)	Winner	The Masterpiece	Àlex Lora
2024	Best WNY Feature	Winner	A Witch Lives in the Attic	Lilith Crimi
2024	Best WNY Short	Winner	Portland is the New Portland	Christopher Scamurra
2024	Best WNY Student Film	Winner	The Waiting Room	
2024	Biff Boundary Breaker (Feature)	Winner	Tre Regole Infallibili / Three Infallible Rules	Marco Gianfreda
2024	BIFF Boundary Breaker (Short)	Winner	Lip Virgin	Shimrit Eldis
2025	Best Animated Film	Winner	Free The Chickens	Matúš Vizár
2025	Best Animated Student Film	Winner	Fireflies At Sunset	Miranda Lenaghan
2025	Best Documentary Feature (Domestic)	Winner	Remaining Native	Paige Bethmann
2025	Best Documentary Feature (Global)	Winner	Yurlu - Country	Yaara Bou Melhem
2025	Best Documentary Short (Domestic)	Winner	My Name Is Not Amy	Dewi Sungai
2025	Best Documentary Short (Global)	Winner	Six Knots	Ali Vanderkruyk
2025	Best Episodic	Winner	Wander Women	Drew Denny
2025	Best Experimental Film	Winner	Peaches Goes Bananas	Marie Losier
2025	Best Narrative Feature (Domestic)	Winner	Fucktoys	Annapurna Sriram
2025	Best Narrative Feature (Domestic)	Winner	The Dutchman	Andre Gaines
2025	Best Narrative Feature (Global)	Winner	اللي باقي منك / All That’s Left Of You	Cherien Dabis
2025	Best Narrative Short (Domestic)	Winner	Newbies	Kimiko Matsuda-Lawrence and Megan Trufant Tillman
2025	Best Narrative Short (Global)	Winner	Hide That Beard!	Sophie Louÿs
2025	Best Student Film	Winner	Roads Between Us	Matthew Donkers
2025	Best WNY Feature	Winner	Baristas Vs Billionaires	Mark Mori
2025	Best WNY Short	Winner	That Old Black Magic	Alan Trinca
2025	BIFF Audience Award	Winner	Under The Lights	Miles Levin
2025	BIFF Boundary Breaker	Winner	The Act Of Dreaming	John Maggio and Neha Shastry
2025	BIFF Boundary Breaker	Winner	A Rare Grand Alignment	Cinqué Lee
