= Angela Washko =

American artist

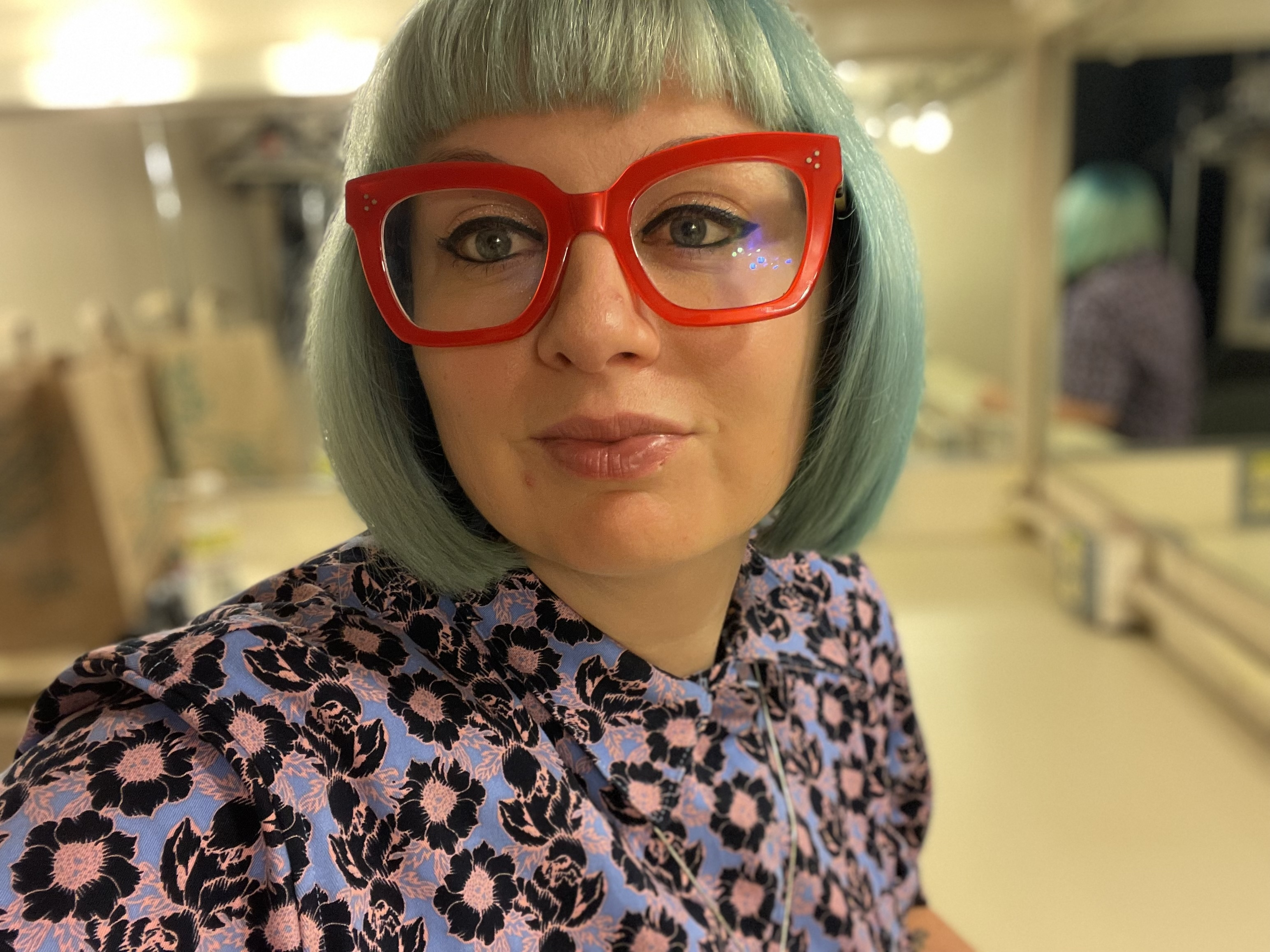
- Washko backstage at the Kelly Strayhorn Theater in Pittsburgh, PA
- Born: 1986 (age 39–40); Reading, Pennsylvania, United States
- Known for: New Media Art Artist, Curator, Facilitator
- Notable work: Playing A Girl, Chastity, The Game: The Game
- Awards: 2012–2013 Recipient of the Terminal Award, 2013–2014 Recipient of the Franklin Furnace Archive Fund Grant, 2013 Full Tuition Research Fellowship, University of California, San Diego, 2018 Recipient of the Impact Award at Indiecade, 2020 Recipient of the Creative Capital Award, 2023 United States Artists Fellowship.

Angela Washko is an American new media artist and facilitator based in New York. After nine years as a professor of art at Carnegie Mellon University, she is currently the Catherine B. Heller Collegiate Professor of Art at University of Michigan. Washko mobilizes communities and creates new forums for discussions of feminism where they do not exist.

Washko is the founder of the Council on Gender Sensitivity and Behavioral Awareness in World of Warcraft to bring attention to and protest the sexist language from players in the game. Washko has been creating performances inside the online video game World of Warcraft (WoW) since 2012 in which she initiates discussions about feminism within the gameplay.

In 2015, Washko presented an ongoing project focused on noted pick-up artist Roosh V, called Banged. The project was initially supported by a Rhizome at the New Museum Internet Art Microgrant. Her video game project "The Game: The Game" premiered in 2018 in a solo exhibition at the Museum of the Moving Image in New York. Johanna Fateman named "The Game: The Game" at Museum of the Moving Image as one of the top ten exhibitions of 2018 for Artforum. Rhizome (organization) added "The Game: The Game" to their Net Art Anthology, a project aiming to preserve historically important works of net art.

In 2021, Angela Washko moved into film-making by directing a documentary film called Workhorse Queen. After premiering at Slamdance Film Festival and a long international film festival run, the film was released in June 2022 for television broadcast and streaming on Starz, and additionally became available for VOD on Amazon Prime, Apple TV, Roku, and Vudu. Workhorse Queen is distributed by Breaking Glass Pictures. Washko was the recipient of the Best Documentary Feature award at American Film Festival in Wroclaw, Poland, and the Grand Jury Prize for Documentary at Buffalo International Film Festival.

In 2020, Angela Washko was awarded the Creative Capital Award for her new video game project "Mother, Player." In 2023, she received the United States Artists Fellowship in the Media category.

== Work ==
In 2014, Creative Time commissioned an essay from Washko on her findings as the self-founded Council on Gender Sensitivity and Behavioral Awareness in World of Warcraft.

She is the first person to ever sell a Vine video. The video was bought by Dutch art advisor, curator and collector Myriam Vanneschi for $200 at the Moving Image Art Fair. The title, "Tits on Tits on Ikea" was an extension to a Vine selected as a runner-up in a project called "The Shortest Video Art Ever Sold," curated by Marina Galperina and Kyle Chayka, submitted to the #VeryShortFilmFest.

Her video work "Chastity" won the Terminal Award from the Center of Excellence in the Creative Arts at Austin Peay State University. She was the 2013 to 2014 Recipient of the Franklin Furnace Fund Grant for her World of Warcraft performances. In 2020, she was awarded the Creative Capital Award.

In 2018, she exhibited her new work "The Game: The Game" at the Museum of the Moving Image. The Game: The Game takes the form of a dating simulator, pitting you against six men who are aggressively vying for your attention at a bar. "The Game: The Game" additionally won the 2018 Impact Award at Indiecade.

In 2021, Angela Washko's first feature-length documentary film about Mrs. Kasha Davis and the Rochester drag community, Workhorse Queen, premiered at the Slamdance Film Festival.

== Art practice ==
Washko's interdisciplinary practice of performance, video, and installation investigates public opinion regarding proper etiquette, appropriate lifestyle choices, limited gender designations. She works in mostly online public spaces of contemporary American culture in order to reach a larger audience with a feminist discourse. Her work has been exhibited by the Museum of the Moving Image (London) in the National #Selfie Portrait Gallery, Biennial of the Americas in The World is !Flat, Denver Digerati in Denver, Colorado, Transfer Gallery in Brooklyn, New York, and Super Art Moderne Museum: Spamm.

She was a contributing writer for Animal NY.

== Curatorial and related activities ==
Washko has organized exhibitions and programs at the University of California, San Diego, New York University, Flux Factory, and Temple University's Tyler School of Art. She curates and compiles A Feminist Art Movement Online, an archive of artists, writers, curators, and cultural producers with various practices addressing issues regarding gendered experiences. These practitioners primarily make and/or distribute their work online and contribute to a shift in making the internet a more inclusive space for women and their cultural work. She was the Department Events Coordinator of Visual Arts at the University of California, San Diego until 2015. She has written for dpi Magazine. In 2013 she hosted the podcast "A Cups" with new media artist Ann Hirsch, made possible by the Radiohive collective in which they interviewed guests such as Nate Hill, Carla Gannis, Chris Gethard, and Genevieve Belleveau. In 2017, she curated the exhibition "Hacking/Modding/Remixing as Feminist Protest" at the Miller Gallery at Carnegie Mellon University in Pittsburgh, Pennsylvania.

== Education ==
Washko graduated in 2009 from Tyler School of Art of Temple University with a Bachelor of Fine Arts in Painting/Drawing/Sculpture. She studied at the Post Graduate Apprentice Program at The Fabric Workshop and Museum in 2009. She graduated in 2015 with a Master of Fine Arts in Visual Art from the University of California, San Diego.

== Exhibitions ==
2015

- The Council on Gender Sensitivity and Behavioral Awareness in World of Warcraft: LIVE, Dixon Place (New York, NY). Presented by Franklin Furnace Archive.
- Memory Burn, July 10 - August 16, 2016, Bitforms Gallery (New York, NY).

2016

- XXI Triennale International Exhibition: 21st Century Design After Design, Game Video/Art: a Survey, Contemporary Hall Gallery, IULM University (Milan, Italy). Curated by Matteo Bittanti e Vincenzo Trione.
- The 3rd Shenzhen Independent Animation Biennale, Dec 2nd, 2016 - March 2, 2017, C2 Space, OCT-LOFT (Shenzhen, China).
- Performing in Public (Four Years of Ephemeral Actions in World of Warcraft), Gallery@CALIT2 at University of California - San Diego.
- The Game: The Game, Transfer Gallery (New York, NY).

2017

- The Game: The Game 2.0, Squeaky Wheel Film and Media Arts Center (Buffalo, NY). Solo exhibition.
- Haunted Machines and Wicked Problems, Impakt Festival (Utrecht, NL).
- Nonlinear Perspectives, Gray Area Foundation for Arts and Technology (San Francisco, CA).
- Survival Rates In Captivity (Free Will Mode #5) (2017), Blinding Pleasures, February 10 - March 18, arebyte Gallery, (London, UK). Curated by Filippo Lorenzin.

2018

- The Game: The Game, Museum of the Moving Image (New York, NY). Solo exhibition curated by Jason Eppink.
- Poking The Hive, George Mason University Gallery (Fairfax, VA). Solo exhibition.
- States of Play: Roleplay Reality, FACT (Liverpool, UK).
- PlayTime, Peabody Essex Museum (Salem, MA).
- Indiecade Festival (Los Angeles, CA).
- Indiecade Europe, Conservatoire National Des Arts et Metiers (Paris, France).

2019

- Open World: Video Games & Contemporary Art, Akron Art Museum (Akron, OH).

2020

- SITUATIONS / STRIKE, Fotomuseum Winterthur (Zurich, Switzerland).

2021

- Point of View, STUK House for Dance, Image, and Sound (Leuven, Belgium). Solo exhibition.
- GAMExCINEMA, Korean Film Archive (Seoul, South Korea).
- American Film Festival (Wroclaw, Poland).
- Slamdance Film Festival (Park City, UT).
- Documentary Edge New Zealand (Auckland, New Zealand).
- Bentonville Film Festival (Bentonville, Arkansas).
- Milwaukee Film Festival (Milwaukee, WI).
- Florida Film Festival (Maitland, FL).
- TLV Fest (Tel Aviv, Israel).
- Vancouver Queer Film Festival (Vancouver, Canada).

2022

- Worldbuilding, Julia Stoschek Collection (Düsseldorf, Germany). Curated by Hans Ulrich Obrist.
- Doc-O-Rama, Portland Art Museum and Northwest Film Center (Portland, OR).
- Mixed Media: Angela Washko and Lucia Marcucci, Temple University Rome Gallery (Rome, Italy). Two-person exhibition.

== See also ==
- Feminist Art
- New media art
- Video Art
- Performance Art
