= Alchemy Film & Moving Image Festival =

UK film festival

Alchemy Film and Moving Image Festival
- Location: Hawick, Scotland
- Established: 2010
- Founded by: Richard Ashrowan
- Directors: Rachael Disbury, Michael Pattison
- Festival date: 28 April - 2 May 2022
- Website: https://alchemyfilmandarts.org.uk

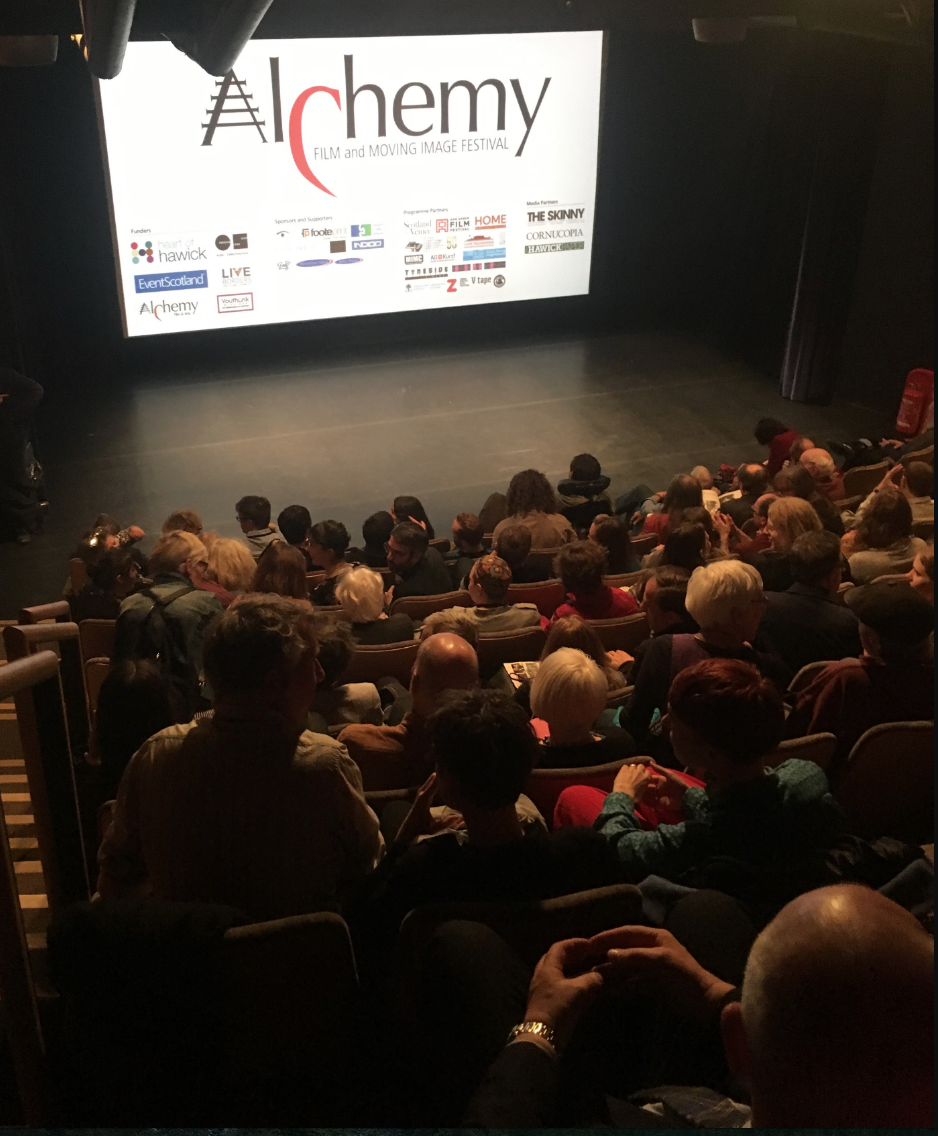

Alchemy Film and Moving Image Festival is an annual film festival and the flagship event of Alchemy Film & Arts that takes place each year in the Scottish Borders town of Hawick. Founded in 2010, it has grown to be considered as one of the key fixtures of experimental and artist film within the UK and Europe.

Alchemy Film & Arts, a registered Scottish Charity, receives regular funding from Creative Scotland. The organisation works "with communities and artists both locally and internationally, using film as a way to come together, have conversations and make positive change." The organisation states that it values "openness, experimentation, creativity, solidarity and humour."

Alchemy Film & Arts and its annual film festival have been directed by Rachael Disbury and Michael Pattison since 2019.

Among its access policies, Alchemy lists that all films barring 16mm presentations are captioned; all programmes are provided with content warnings; tickets to cinema screenings are priced at a sliding scale. In addition, the festival's open call for entries has a tiered 'pay what you can' system and offers full waivers to any artist in need of one. The festival states on its FilmFreeway page that it is proudly non-competitive and that it "believes premiere policies – whereby a film is disqualified from screening at one event because it was exhibited by another – actively produce competition, disparity and territorialism between artists, communities and curators."

In addition to its annual film festival, Alchemy Film & Arts produces year-round projects that encompass artist residencies, commissions and film exhibitions, research and discussion events, and a community filmmaking and creative learning programme.

== History ==
=== 2010–2019 ===
Alchemy Film and Moving Image Festival was founded in 2010 by Scottish Borders based artist Richard Ashrowan. Ashrowan was the Creative Director of the festival and of Alchemy Film & Arts from 2010 to 2018. Situating the festival in the rural Scottish Borders town of Hawick, he described its foundation as "a provocation to prevailing urban-centrism in terms of culture", an attempt to create "a quality of friendliness and intimacy, an environment in which filmmakers, audiences and volunteers all mix, generating a real outpouring of creativity and conversation". The main cinema screenings were held in an award-winning converted spinning mill, Tower Mill, which was part of Heart of Hawick, a partner organisation for the festival. The festival utilised a variety of disused and ex-industrial spaces for moving image installations through the town. During this period the festival became internationally notable, showing around 130 films each year, a mixed programme of short films, feature films, moving image installations, specialist curated programmes and live expanded cinema performances.

Alchemy Film & Arts further developed projects for experimental film and artists’ moving image production in Scotland, including artists’ filmmaking residencies in Scotland and Morocco, high street exhibitions programmes, filmmaking symposia, touring programmes and community film projects. The Scottish Borders Moving Image Makers Collective was founded out of a workshop series in 2014. In 2017, Ashrowan curated Scotland’s national exhibition at the Venice Biennale for Alchemy Film & Arts, presenting a film commission by the artist filmmaker Rachel Maclean. The first eight editions of Alchemy featured premiere screenings by influential artists and experimental filmmakers, including Jan Švankmajer, Sarah Pucill, Andrew Kötting, Rachel Maclean, the Brothers Quay, Semiconductor (artists), Mike Hoolboom, Nina Danino, Patrick Bokanowski, Jacques Perconte, Mark Leckey and Ben Rivers.

== Editions ==
=== 2020 ===
The tenth edition of Alchemy Film and Moving Image Festival took place 1–3 May 2020. Due to the Scottish lockdown imposed as result of the COVID-19 pandemic, this was its first exclusively digital iteration. 'Alchemy Live' happened over three days with a series of free online screenings and events that included 72 films over 15 programmes. The programme included features Phantom Ride by Stephen Broomer and Corporate Accountability by Jonathan Perel.

=== 2021 ===
The eleventh edition of Alchemy Film and Moving Image Festival took place online 29 April - 3 May 2021. It was free to attend and available, streaming 171 films across both live and on-demand programmes as well as an exhibition.

The eleventh edition featured keynote lectures from Marxist intellectual Vijay Prashad, a live performance on the Scottish Black Atlantic by Natasha Ruwona, an artist talk and screening from Emma Wolukau-Wanambwa about her 2018 film Promised Lands and two guest-curated shorts programmes - one by Greg de Cuir Jr on the intersection of race and ecology and another by New Programmers, a group of young people from the Scottish Borders mentored by Alchemy, on care, healing and mutualism.

The eleventh edition also featured seven on-demand programmes, dedicated to individual artists including Baff Akoto, Dagie Brundert, Richard Fung, Emily Jacir, Jason Moyes, belit sağ, and to artists from the Scottish Borders and South of Scotland. In addition, six newly commissioned artworks encompassing image, text and sound, were presented by artists Ania Bas, Jamie Crewe, Harry Josephine Giles, Jade Montserrat, Cinzia Mutigli and Kaiya Waerea.

=== 2022 ===
The twelfth edition of Alchemy Film and Moving Image Festival was from 28 April to 2 May in Hawick, with more than 120 films screening in venues and online. It was the first edition of the festival to take place in-person since 2019.

The programme included a keynote from Alchemy artist in resident Jade Montserrat, who also presented Ritual Passage: Memorials for Frederick Douglass and Thomas Jenkins, her new commission, at Heritage Hub. Elsewhere in the programme, Alchemy artist in residence Mark Lyken presents the world premiere of Notes from a Low Orbit, a new feature film made about Hawick, its communities and their rituals. Focus artists included Julia Parks (another Alchemy Film & Arts resident) and Ghanaian-American artist Akosua Adoma Owusu.

The free-to-view exhibitions programme includes a video jukebox of footage from Borders Community Film Archive, Alchemy's digital preservation project; a showcase of work produced as part of Film Town, Alchemy's year-round community engagement strategy; a new 16mm installation shot in Hawick by Leah Millar; and the first outing of Moving Images, a new solar-powered cinema converted from a 1980s caravan initiated by artist Kerry Jones with bursary funds from Alchemy Film & Arts.

== Other projects ==
=== The Teviot, the Flag and the Rich, Rich Soil ===
As part of its year-round programme, Alchemy launched The Teviot, the Flag and the Rich, Rich Soil in July 2021. Described as a "programme of artist residencies, film commissions, discussion events and community engagement exploring the borders, boundaries and lines of Hawick and the Scottish Borders", the project is part of Creative Scotland's Culture Collective Fund.

Taking place between July 2021 and December 2023, the project "engages artists in working with communities to consider the pasts, presents and futures of Hawick while researching and investigating the town and wider region’s cultural identities in relation to land, water, industry, territory, place and environment".

Residency artists include Mark Lyken, Jade Montserrat, Julia Parks and Jules Horne. Commissions include work by Jessie Growden, Andy Mackinnon, Leah Millar and Natasha Ruwona. The programme also offers an artist bursary and traineeships scheme.

=== Film Town ===
In summer 2019, Alchemy launched Film Town, an award-winning community filmmaking initiative that aims to work with local partners to widen access and cultural inclusion for Hawick and its communities. Community groups with whom Alchemy have partnered to make films include Branching Out Youth Group (Borders Additional Needs Group), After a Suicide Working Group (NHS Borders), Scottish Borders Rape Crisis Centre, Borders Women's Aid, Scouts Scotland, Hawick Congregational Community Church, Hadrian Creatives, Borders College, and Interest Link, a volunteer befriending service working with young people with learning disabilities and vulnerable adults across the Scottish Borders.

=== Outwith ===
In April 2021, Alchemy launched Outwith, a filmmaking academy and creative network programme for 16-25-year-olds in the Scottish Borders. Partnering groups include Branching Out Youth Group (Borders Additional Needs Group), Hadrian Creatives and LGBT Youth Borders.

=== Continue Watching ===
From October 2020 to April 2021, Alchemy delivered Continue Watching, an online season of film screenings, discussion events and critical writing, featuring work by Yashaswini Raghunandan, Noorafshan Mirza and Brad Butler, Joshua Bonnetta, Clemens Wilhelm and Jan Martinec, and two guest-curated programmes - by Marcus Jack, of artists' moving image in Scotland from 1970 to 2020, and Jonathan Ali, of experimental horror films from the Caribbean. Commissioned texts for the season were written by Jemma Desai, Sonya Dyer and Alix Rothnie. A discussion event, Archive, Verb, exploring the ways in which experimental film can be considered archival, featured artists Ashanti Harris, Onyeka Igwe, Sophie Lindsey and Ed Webb-Ingall.
