= Nathan Hill =

Nathan or Nate Hill may refer to:

- Nate Hill (American football) (1966–2012), American football player
- Nate Hill (artist) (born 1977), American performance artist
- Nathan Hill (writer), author of 2017 novel The Nix
- Nathan W. Hill (born 1979), American historical linguist and Tibetologist

== See also ==
- Nathaniel Hill (disambiguation)
- Nathan Hills, New Zealand
