= Nathaniel Hill =

Nathaniel Hill may refer to:

- Nathaniel P. Hill (1832–1900), United States Senator from Colorado
- Nathaniel Hill (artist) (1861–1934), Irish impressionist

== See also ==
- Nate Hill (disambiguation)
