= Big Gay Ice Cream =

New York City-based ice cream company

- Type: Private company
- Industry: Ice cream
- Founded: 2009; 17 years ago in New York City, New York
- Defunct: 2025
- Headquarters: New York City, New York, United States
- Key people: Doug Quint, Bryan Petroff
- Products: Ice cream
- Website: www.biggayicecream.com

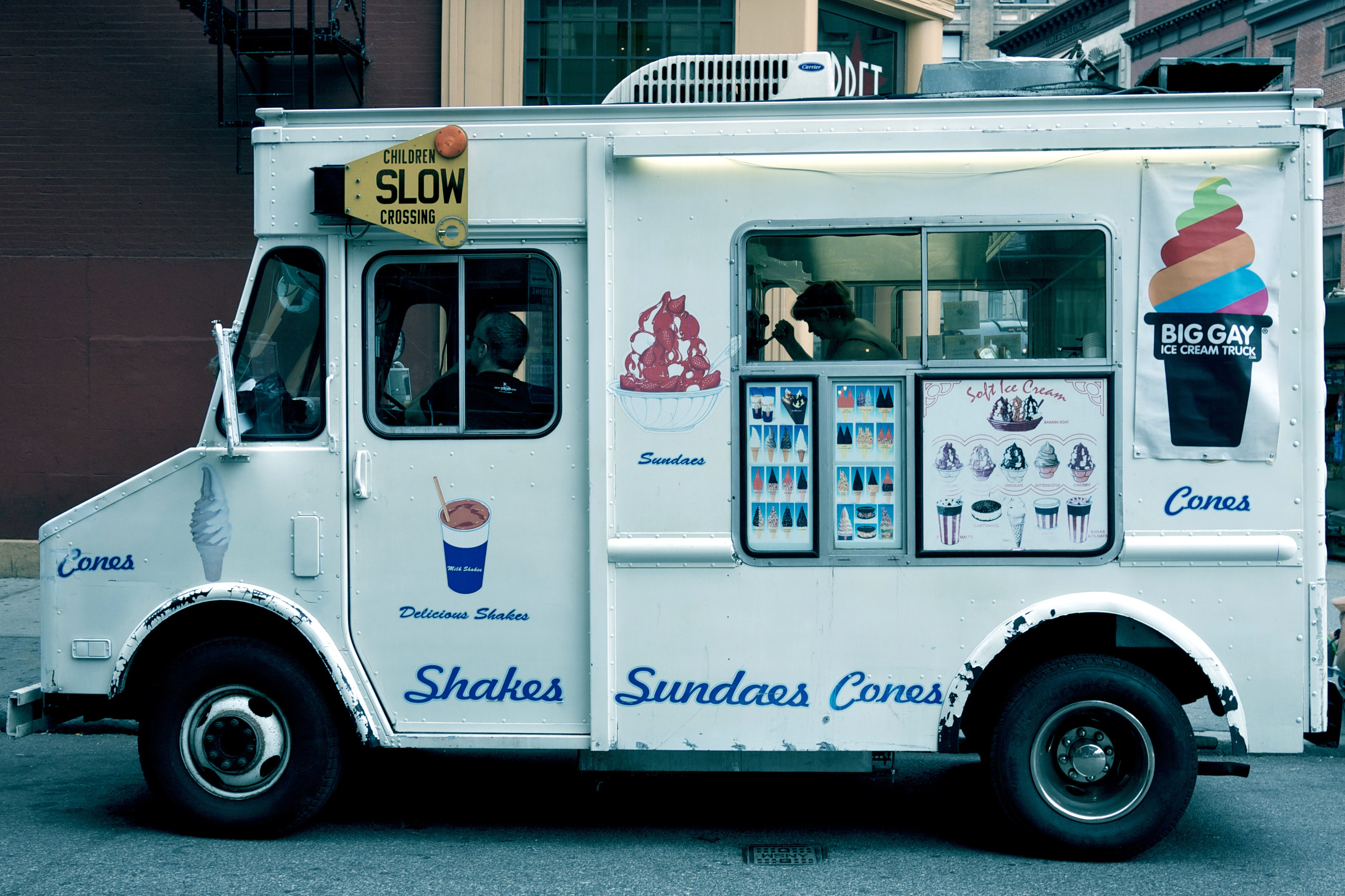
The Big Gay Ice Cream Truck

Big Gay Ice Cream (BGIC) was a New York City–based company that started with an ice cream truck. At the company's peak they operated four storefronts in New York City and one in Philadelphia. Co-founded by Doug Quint and Bryan Petroff, BGIC specializes in soft-serve ice cream cones, cups, and novelties with a menu of unique and unusual flavors and toppings. BGIC was part of a wider trend of gourmet and upscale food trucks popular in the United States.

BGIC has an official theme song, written and recorded by Jane Wiedlin of The Go-Go's.

== Name ==
The use of gay in the company name refers both to the sexual orientation of co-founders Doug Quint and Bryan Petroff and to its older, seldom-used definition, "happy". According to Quint: "If I weren't gay, I wouldn't call it the Big Gay Ice Cream Truck. And if I weren't happy, I wouldn't have the Big Gay Ice Cream Truck. It would just be the big crabby ice cream truck."

In an interview with CNN, Quint said he and Petroff were not seeking to be "hyper-political" with the name; they wanted their customers to interpret it however they wanted, with Quint saying "we preferred people make assumptions".

== History ==
Doug Quint was a freelance classical bassoonist looking for a secondary occupation in the summer off-season. A flautist friend had been operating an ice cream truck of her own and suggested that Quint do the same. On June 13, 2009, the Big Gay Ice Cream Truck began operations at Brooklyn Pride in Prospect Park, Brooklyn. The ice cream truck itself has been dormant since 2011, with only occasional appearances for major events.

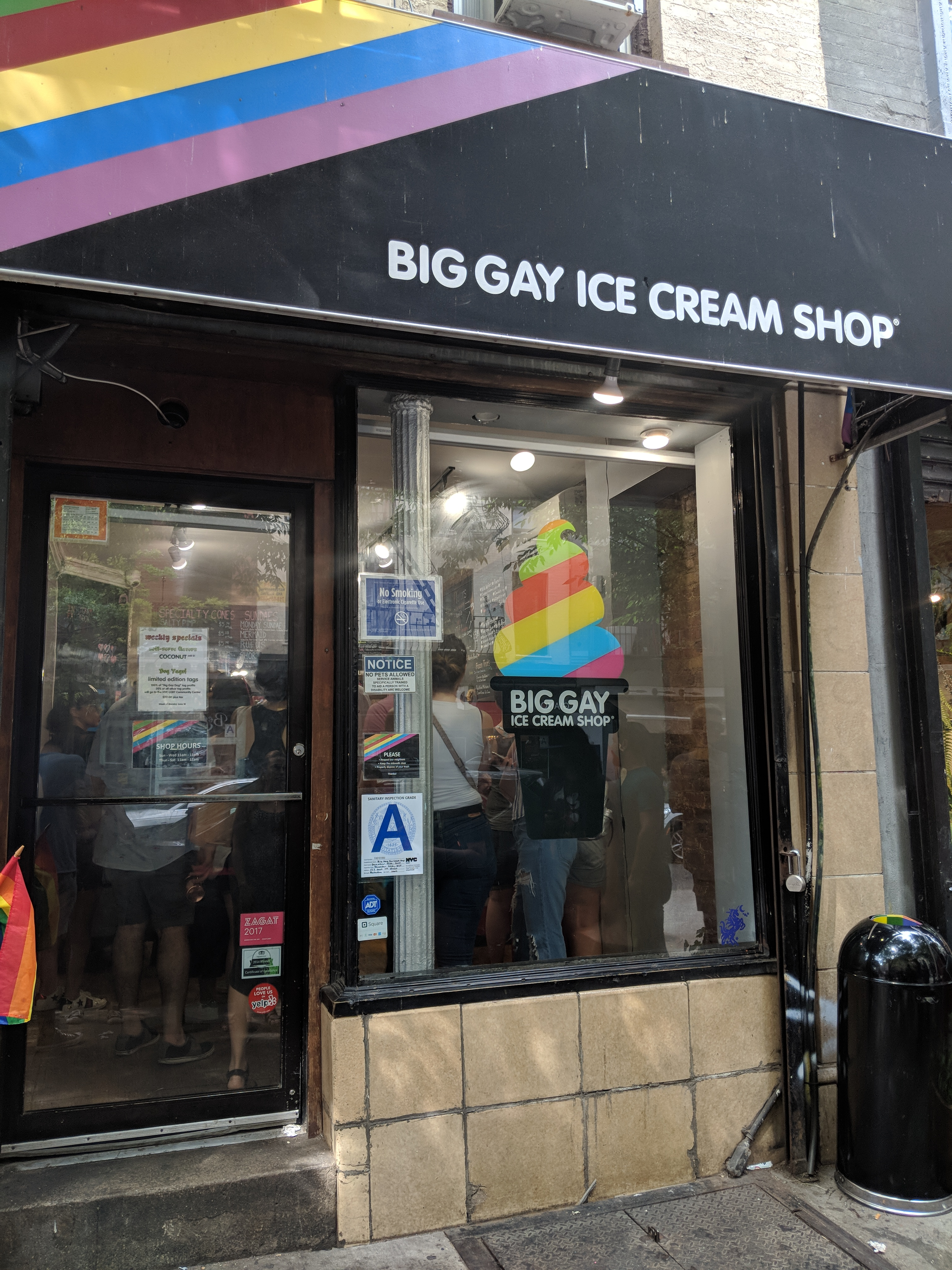
Storefront in the East Village

After two years of operating a roving truck, Quint and Petroff opened their first store – the Big Gay Ice Cream Shop, in New York's East Village. Approximately a year later, they opened a second location in the West Village. A pop-up store opened in the Ace Hotel in Los Angeles in late 2014. A Philadelphia location opened in 2015 at the corner of South and South Broad Streets.

The pair co-authored a book, titled Big Gay Ice Cream: Saucy Stories & Frozen Treats: Going All the Way with Ice Cream, with an introduction by Anthony Bourdain, released in 2015.

The business relies on social media instead of traditional advertising, in order to connect directly with its customers. Quint and Petroff also frequently blog about their experiences.

In 2017, Big Gay Ice Cream started selling packaged pints of "hard" ice cream in convenience stores and grocery stores.

In 2023, after a "silent" partner took over the business by force, Quint sued to get back control of the company.

In 2025, the last remaining Big Gay Ice Cream location closed.

== See also ==
- List of food trucks
- Genevieve Belleveau, performance artist and operations manager of the Big Gay Ice Cream Truck
