= Mrs. Kasha Davis =

American drag performer (born 1971)

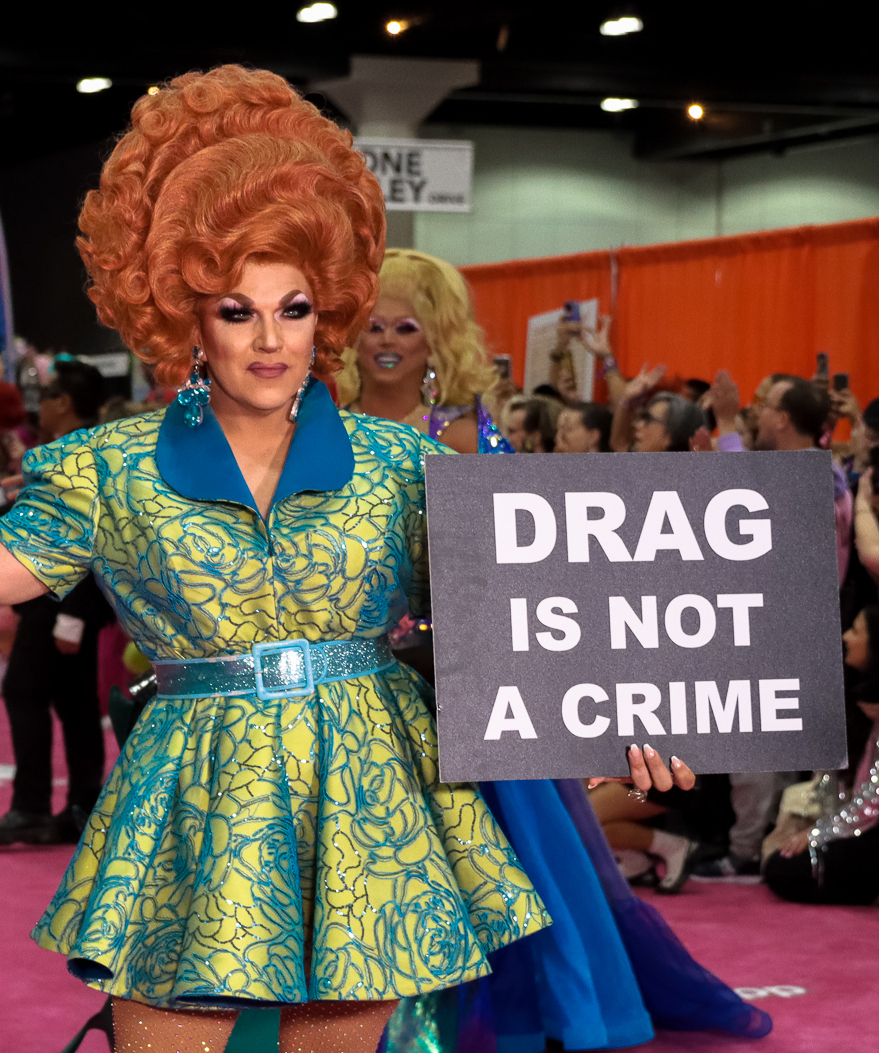
- Mrs. Kasha Davis at RuPaul's DragCon LA, 2023
- Born: Edward Paul Popil Jr. March 12, 1971 (age 55); Scranton, Pennsylvania, U.S.
- Education: Marywood University (BA)
- Occupations: Drag queen, singer
- Website: mrskashadavis.net

Mrs. Kasha Davis (born March 12, 1971) is the stage name of Edward Paul Popil Jr., an American drag queen, actor and television personality from Scranton, Pennsylvania. She is best known for competing on the seventh season of RuPaul's Drag Race and the eighth season of RuPaul's Drag Race All Stars. After appearing on the reality television show, Mrs. Kasha Davis toured internationally, released several musical singles, and performed in film, television and theatre.

== Career ==
Based in Rochester, Mrs. Kasha Davis frequently performs with long-time collaborators and fellow RuPaul's Drag Race alums Pandora Boxx and Darienne Lake. She has performed "Bosom Buddies", a two-woman show with Darienne Lake nationally and internationally. Prior to Drag Race, Mrs. Kasha Davis starred in and co-wrote the film Mrs. Kasha Davis: The Life of an International Housewife Celebrity with Michael Steck (Pandora Boxx). For fourteen years, Mrs. Kasha Davis has co-written and performed with fellow Rochester-based drag queen Aggy Dune in "Big Wigs", a touring diva impersonation theater show.

Mrs. Kasha Davis has performed her one-woman show "There's Always Time for a Cocktail" at Laurie Beechman Theater in New York, as well as venues in San Francisco, Rochester, London and Brighton in the United Kingdom. She is also an advocate for and frequent performer in Drag Story Hour, a national event bringing drag queens into libraries and theaters to read books to children.

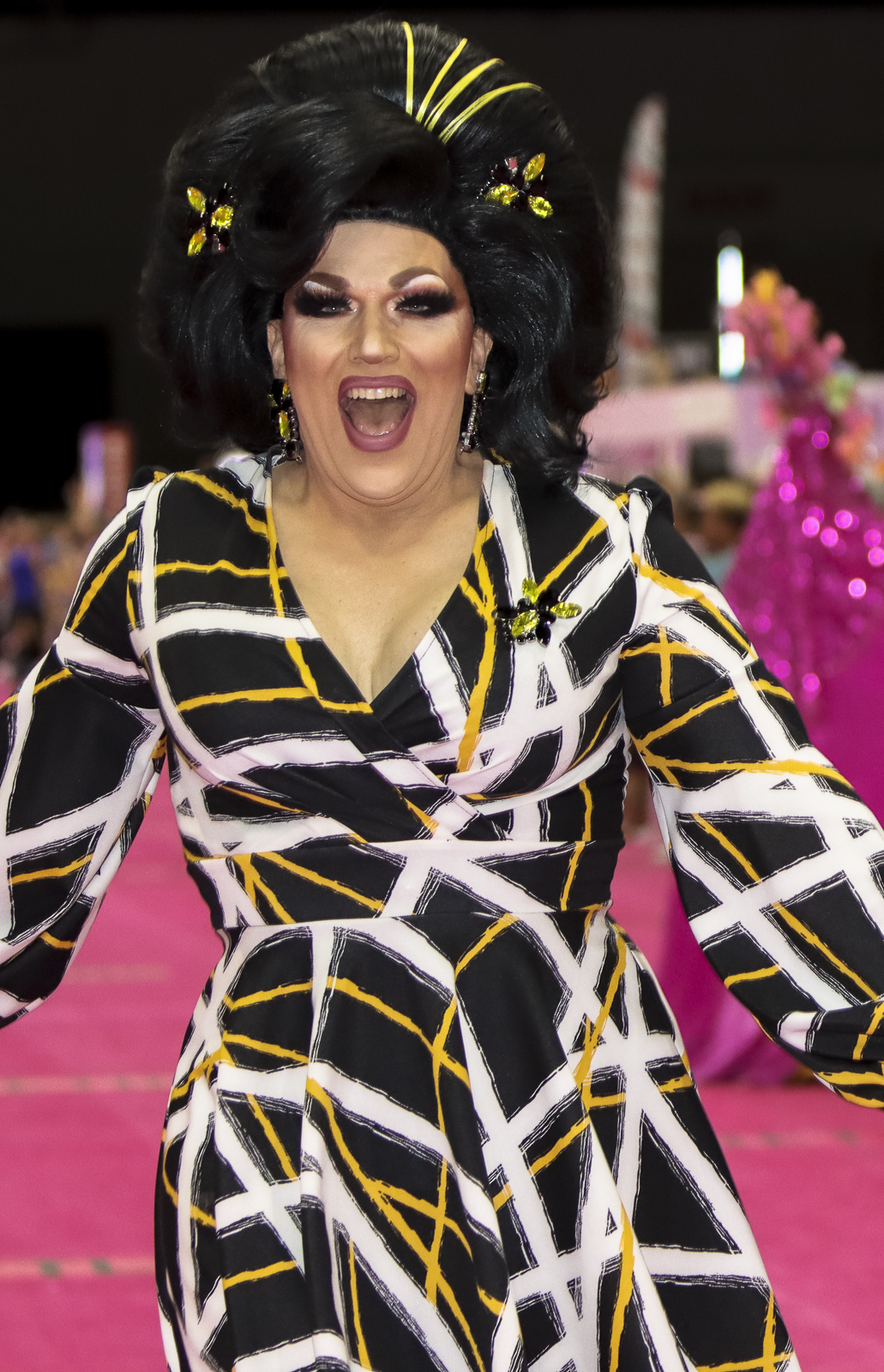
Mrs. Kasha Davis at RuPaul's DragCon LA in 2022

Since appearing on RuPaul's Drag Race, Mrs. Kasha Davis is currently starring with Deven Green in WOW Presents Plus series Tails of the City: Pets 4 Pets. She additionally had a supporting role as Vicki Leaks in the film Hurricane Bianca 2: From Russia with Hate and hosted the film's Los Angeles premiere.

In June 2019, Mrs. Kasha Davis was one of 37 queens to be featured on the cover of New York Magazine. In 2021, director Angela Washko's documentary film Workhorse Queen premiered at Slamdance Film Festival. The film focuses on Popil's life before and after getting cast on RuPaul's Drag Race. In 2023, Davis was announced as a competitor on the eighth season of RuPaul's Drag Race All Stars. During Episode Three, she landed in the bottom two alongside Darienne Lake, and the winner of the week's "lip-sync for the win", Jessica Wild (who beat the episode's "lip-sync assassin”, Ra'Jah O'Hara, to Kim Petras’ “Coconuts”), chose Davis to be eliminated, giving her a placement of 10th out of 12 contestants.

== Personal life ==
Popil was born to Ellen, a cosmetics saleswoman, and Edward Paul Popil Sr., a U.S. Marshal. She grew up in Taylor, Pennsylvania. Her grandmother, Mae Miller, was a local celebrity vaudeville whistler in Scranton who hosted a local radio show called The Italian Hour. She is married to Steven Levins, who frequently makes out-of-drag public appearances alongside Davis as "Mr. Kasha Davis". He is a stepfather to his two children, Melissa and Jessica, making him one of the few Drag Race contestants with children.

He and Levins frequently collaborate on music and video content. He graduated from Marywood University with a BA in theatre before becoming a principal dancer at the Ballet Theatre of Scranton. He has been sober since July 13, 2015.

From 1988 to 1998, until coming out as gay, he was married to a woman.

During the Fall 2023 - Spring 2024 semester, Popil taught at SUNY Brockport as a artist-in-residence in partnership with the college.

== Filmography ==
=== Film ===
Year	Title	Role	Notes
2008	Mrs. Kasha Davis: The Life of an International Housewife Celebrity	Mrs. Kasha Davis	Short film; actor
2018	Hurricane Bianca: From Russia with Hate	Vicki Leaks	Film; actor
2021	Workhorse Queen	Herself	Documentary

=== Television ===
Year	Title	Role	Notes
2015	RuPaul's Drag Race	Herself	11th Place (Eliminated in Episode 5)
2016	Hey Qween!	Herself	Season 4, Episode 4
2018	RuPaul's Drag Race	Herself	Season 10, Episode 1
2018	The Browns	Herself	Guest appearance
2023	RuPaul's Drag Race All Stars	Herself	Contestant
2023	RuPaul's Drag Race All Stars: Untucked	Herself	Contestant
2023	Drag Me to Dinner	Herself	Hulu original

=== Music videos ===
Year	Title	Artist
2015	"Uptown Fish"	Shangela

=== Web series ===
Year	Title	Role	Notes	Ref.
2015	RuPaul's Drag Race: Untucked	Herself		
2017	Transformations with James St. James	Herself	Season 5, Episode 3	
2018	Tails of the City: Pets 4 Pets	Herself		
2019	This Is Shit	Herself	Host, World of Wonder original	
2020	The Golden Pandemic	Sophia	Starring role	
2023	Meet the Queens	Herself	Stand-alone special RuPaul's Drag Race All Stars 8	
2023	EW News Flash	Herself	Guest	
2023	BuzzFeed Celeb	Herself	Guest	

== Discography ==
=== EPs ===
Title	Release date	Label	Formats
It Takes a Lot of Balls to Be a Lady!	May 8, 2016	Self-released	digital download

=== Singles ===
==== As lead artist ====
Title	Year	Album
"Cocktail"	2015	Non-album singles
"Seasoned Queen" (featuring Adam Barta)	2015	Non-album singles
"Basic"	2018	Non-album singles

==== As featured artist ====
Title	Year	Album
"Can I Get an Amen"	2015	RuPaul Presents: The CoverGurlz 2
"One Last Christmas Card" (Adam Barta featuring Mrs. Kasha Davis, Eureka O'Hara, & Kennedy Davenport)	2016	Non-album singles
"Money, Success, Fame, Glamour" (Disco version) (with the cast of RuPaul's Drag Race All Stars season 8)	2023	Non-album singles

=== Other appearances ===
Song	Year	Other Artist(s)	Album
"Cocktail" (Jared Jones Mojito Radio Mix)	2019	Jared Jones	JRED Music Presents... Jared Jones Remixes
"Always Time"	2019	Nico Raimont	Popstar
"Free To Be" (Brian Cua Club Remix)	2023	Various Artist	Free To Be (The Remixes)
