= Trinity Centre for Asian Studies =

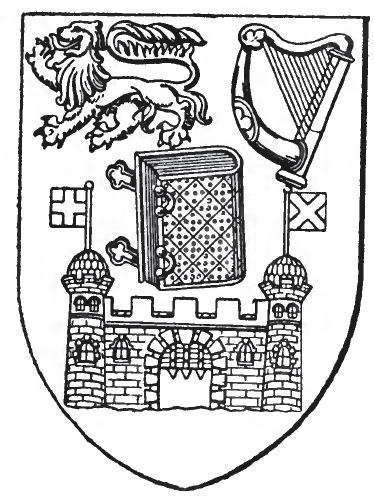
- Location: Trinity College Dublin
- Director: Prof. Nathan W. Hill
- Staff: Ms Eunjee Do, adjunct Assistant Professor in Korean Studies; Dr Keiko Inoue, Japanese language instructor; Jiang Renfeng, Mandarin language instructor; Lu Xiaoxiang, Mandarin language instructor (on secondment from Fujian Normal University); Prof. Xin Sun, Assistant Professor in Chinese Studies (Political Science)
- Website: www.tcd.ie/Asian/

The Trinity Centre for Asian Studies (TCAS) is a multidisciplinary teaching and research centre for East Asian scholarship at Trinity College in Dublin, Ireland.

TCAS includes teaching and research in Chinese, Korean and Japanese Studies as well as Asian area studies, pan-Asian and Asian/European comparative research. Its research activities focus on contemporary Asian society and culture, Mandarin, Korean and Japanese language learning, migrant and diaspora studies, and comparative studies.

The current director of TCAS is Nathan W. Hill.

== Teaching and research ==
Chinese Studies

TCAS offers a two-year taught postgraduate degree (M.Phil.) in Chinese studies which focuses on the study of China in a contemporary, comparative perspective. Trinity has a relationship with China dating back to TCD's 'Mission to the Far East' (1886) and the establishment of what was then called Trinity College Fuzhou in 1907. This is now Fuzhou Foreign Language School, Fujian Normal University, and the two institutions maintain a bilateral partnership with teacher exchanges.

In the 1970s and 1980s, Trinity College Dublin was one of the first universities in Europe to welcome Chinese students, who mostly came from Beijing and Nanjing. The TCAS extramural Mandarin language programme has been running for the last two decades, and the TCAS also offers optional Mandarin language classes to all TCD undergraduates and postgraduates.

Trinity College offers two Government of Ireland International Scholarships for Chinese postgraduate students, offered in any of the university's postgraduate disciplines in Arts, Humanities, Social sciences, Science, Computer science, Engineering, Mathematics and Health Sciences.

In 2014, Trinity signed a strategic partnership with Fudan University during the visit of the Irish President, Michael D. Higgins. The university has also signed Memoranda of Understanding with Beihang University, Peking University, Tsinghua University and the University of Nottingham Ningbo, offering bilateral study abroad opportunities for students in these universities.

Korean Studies

The Korean Studies programme at Trinity College commenced in 2010, with for-credit modules in Korean language and culture integrated within the undergraduate programme, as well as opportunities for postgraduate supervision. The programme has received support from the Korea Foundation for three consecutive years since 2011.

Japanese Studies

The Japanese language programme at TCD has been running for several decades, with classes at three proficiency levels in Japanese language and culture. The Japan Foundation's Grant Program for Japanese-language Education Activities has supported the TCAS to offer credit-bearing Japanese modules which are fully integrated within the university's undergraduate programme. The university has signed Memoranda of Understanding with Tokyo University and Kyoto University, enabling Irish and Japanese students to study abroad. A very popular 'Arts of Japan' module is provided in the School of Histories and Humanities.

== Events and activities ==
- Inaugural Asian Studies Lecture Series 2014/15. Speakers include the Ambassador of Japan in Ireland, H.E. Mr Atsumi Chihiro, Mr Leo Goodstadt, Professor Rosa Chun, Dr Kevin Cawley.
- Korean Speech Contest, 11 October 2014. Funded by the Korea Foundation and in collaboration with the Embassy of the Republic of South Korea.
- Literate Culture of the Mongols, Professor Gantogtokh, Professor of Linguistics, National University of Mongolia. Fresher's Week event 2014.
- Special Issue of the journal of Language Learning in Higher Education (4.2) on Chinese and Japanese Language Learning in Higher Education, guest edited by Lorna Carson and Heath Rose.
- Public lecture by Dr Laurence Cox (NUIM), A dissident Orientalism? Irish Buddhism in European perspective, 11 February 2013.
- International EurKorea 2013 conference, European perspectives on Korea. Multidisciplinary comparative conference in Korean Studies (7 – 9 November 2013).
- First Irish Quiz on Korea, 10 June 2013. South Korean television game show organized as part of an annual international public diplomacy programme by the Ministry of Foreign Affairs of the Republic of Korea and KBS television. The quiz tests participants' general knowledge of Korea.
- Public lecture by Professor Maurizio Riotto, Defensive Fundamentalism in Korea: From history to literature, 23 January 2013.

== Selected publications ==
- Bertoni, R. (2014). EurKorea 2013: European Perspectives of Korea. Acta of the conference held at Trinity College Dublin, 7 to 9 November 2013. Dublin and Turin, Trinity College and Trauben, 280pp.
- Bertoni, R. (2013). Scorci di Korea/Glimpses of Korea. Dublin and Turin, Trinity College and Trauben, 386pp.
- Bertoni, R. (2012). Buddhismo e Occidente: capoversi introduttivi. Dublin and Turin, Trinity College and Trauben, 204pp.
- Carson, L. (2014). An exploration of the roles of English in societal and individual multilingualism in Korea. In Bertoni, R. (Ed.), EurKorea 2013: European Perspectives of Korea. Dublin and Turin, Trinity College and Trauben, pp2 – 25.
- Carson, L. (2013). Perspectives on Korea within and from contemporary Europe: The cases of Italy and Ireland. In Bertoni, R. (Ed.), Scorci di Korea/Glimpses of Korea. Dublin and Turin, Trinity College and Trauben, pp2 – 13.
- Carson, L. & Do, E.-J. (2013). Establishing a Korean language programme in a European Higher Education context: Rationale, curriculum and assessment procedures. Language Learning in Higher Education, 3(1), 151 – 171.
- Rose, H. & Carson, L. (2014). Introduction: An overview of Chinese and Japanese language learning around the world, and of foreign language education in Japan and China. Language Learning in Higher Education, 4(2), 257 – 269.
