= Workhorse Queen =

2021 American documentary film

- Directed by: Angela Washko
- Starring: Mrs. Kasha Davis; Steven Levins; Darienne Lake; Pandora Boxx; Roy Haylock; Tatianna; Tempest DuJour; Thomas Smalley (Aggy Dune)
- Cinematography: Angela Washko
- Edited by: Jota Sosnowski; Sunita Prasad; Sonia Gonzalez-Martinez
- Music by: Jesse Stiles
- Release dates: February 2021 (Slamdance); May 3, 2022 (United States)
- Running time: 88 minutes
- Country: United States
- Language: English

Workhorse Queen is a 2021 documentary film directed by Angela Washko. After a surprise casting onto reality television show RuPaul's Drag Race, 47-year old suburban telemarketing manager Ed Popil leaves his job to pursue a full-time entertainment industry career as his drag queen alter ego, 1960s-era housewife Mrs. Kasha Davis. The film premiered at the 2021 Slamdance Film Festival. Workhorse Queen will be released on video on demand and DVD through the film's distributor Breaking Glass Pictures on May 3, 2022, and on TV broadcast and streaming in June, 2022 on STARZ.

== Plot ==
The documentary follows Ed Popil as he escapes from his day job at DialAmerica to perform as drag queen Mrs. Kasha Davis at night. After seven years of sending audition tapes to RuPaul's Drag Race casting calls, Ed Popil was finally cast onto Season 7 of the reality television show in 2015. Workhorse Queen explores how mainstream television has affected queer performance culture. In addition to following Ed's life before and after being cast onto Drag Race, the film focuses on the growing divide between members of the Rochester drag community – those who have been on TV, and those who have not. Throughout the film, audiences watch as Ed navigates the highs and lows of pursuing the fame promised by a reality television platform, including his struggles with alcoholism, declining bookings, and ageism within the industry. The film culminates in Ed returning to his home in Rochester and creating Imagination Station (a new variety show for children), which allows him to become the queer role model for kids that he never had growing up.

In addition to highlighting Mrs. Kasha Davis' journey through drag communities and the entertainment industry, the film also features performances, interviews and vérité footage of his husband Steven Levins (aka Mr. Davis) and drag queens Darienne Lake, Pandora Boxx, Bianca Del Rio, Tatianna, Tempest DuJour, Aggy Dune, Wednesday Westwood, Bebe Gunn (Australia), Jemima Handful (Australia), and many others.

== Featured interviews ==
- Ed Popil (Mrs. Kasha Davis), drag queen
- Steven Levins, Ed's husband
- Aggy Dune, Rochester drag queen
- Darienne Lake, Rochester drag queen and RuPaul's Drag Race contestant
- Pandora Boxx, Rochester drag queen and RuPaul's Drag Race contestant
- Ambrosia Salad, Rochester drag queen
- Bianca Del Rio, drag queen and RuPaul's Drag Race contestant
- Tatianna, drag queen and RuPaul's Drag Race contestant
- Tempest DuJour, drag queen and RuPaul's Drag Race contestant
- Chad Michaels, drag queen and RuPaul's Drag Race contestant
- Bebe Gunn, Australian drag queen
- Jemima Handful, Australian drag queen
- Wednesday Westwood, Rochester drag queen
- Simona Ioffe, drag enthusiast
- Topher Wouters, drag enthusiast
- Tim Huffman-Hutchins, drag enthusiast
- Carrie Vernon, former chair of Rochester Pride
- Diane Chevron, Rochester theater legend
- Pete Smith, Australian club promoter

=== Appearances via archival footage ===
- James St. James
- Heklina
- Sister Roma
- Sisters of Perpetual Indulgence
- Miss Richfield 1981
- Lyndsey Parker
- RuPaul
- Chad Michaels

== Reception ==
Workhorse Queen premiered at the 2021 Slamdance Film Festival. The film holds a 100% approval rating on Rotten Tomatoes. Josiah Teal of Film Threat said, “Workhorse Queen is as incredibly catty, stylish, and entertaining as you could hope.” Bears Rebecca Fonté of Hammer to Nail said, “…Workhorse Queen is the first film I've seen about a drag queen that even starts to deal with the difficulty and monolithic placement of RuPaul.” Malika Harris of Irish Film Critic gave the film 4 and a half out of 5 stars and said, “This documentary takes you through the ups and downs of what really happens post-reality TV fame…” Raquel Stetcher of Quelle Movies calls the film “a must see for fans of RPDR.”

=== Accolades ===
Official selection of:

- 2021 Slamdance Film Festival
- 2021 American Film Festival (Wroclaw, Poland)
- 2021 Bentonville Film Festival
- 2021 Florida Film Festival
- 2021 Documentary Edge Festival New Zealand
- 2021 Calgary Underground Film Festival
- 2021 Milwaukee Film Festival
- 2021 Tampa International Gay and Lesbian Film Festival
- 2021 Buffalo International Film Festival
- 2021 Vancouver Queer Film Festival
- 2021 New Haven Documentary Film Festival

=== Awards ===
- Jury Prize for Best Documentary Feature, Buffalo International Film Festival
- Audience Award for Best Documentary Feature, American Film Festival (Wroclaw, Poland)
