= Sondra Perry =

American visual artist

- Born: 1986 (age 39–40); Perth Amboy, New Jersey, U.S.
- Awards: Gwendolyn Knight and Jacob Lawrence Prize (2017)
- Website: sondraperry.com

Sondra Perry is an interdisciplinary artist who works with video, computer-based media, installation, and performance. Perry's work investigates "blackness, black femininity, African American heritage" and the portrayal or representation of black people throughout history, focusing on how blackness influences technology and image making. Perry explores the duality of intelligence and seductiveness in the contexts of black family heritage, black history, and black femininity. "Perry is committed to net neutrality and ideas of collective production and action, using open source software to edit her work and leasing it digitally for use in galleries and classrooms, while also making all her videos available for free online. This principle of open access in Perry's practice aims to privilege black life, to democratize access to art and culture, and to offer a critical platform that differentiates itself from the portrayal of blackness in the media". For Perry, blackness is a technology which creates fissures in systems of surveillance and control and thus creates inefficiency as an opportunity for resistance.

== Career ==
Sondra Perry received a BFA from Alfred University in 2012, and an MFA from Columbia University in 2015. Perry has been an adjunct faculty member at Columbia University School of the Arts as of 2019, where she has taught Advanced Video to both graduate and undergraduate students. Perry has had multiple solo exhibitions, including at The Kitchen, for her work "Resident Evil", and at the Institute for New Connotative Action. Her work has been exhibited at MoMA PS1 The Museum of Contemporary Art in Los Angeles, and online at Rhizome. Perry's video work has been screened at Tribeca Cinemas in New York, Les Voutes in Paris, France, LuXun Academy of Fine Arts Museum in Shenyang, China, and at the LOOP Barcelona Media Arts Festival. From January to May 2017, Sondra Perry had a solo exhibition, flesh out, at Squeaky Wheel Film and Media Art Center in Buffalo, New York. Perry was awarded a 2017 Louis Comfort Tiffany Foundation Grant, and the 2017 Gwendolyn Knight and Jacob Lawrence Prize, which includes a solo show at the Seattle Art Museum and a $10,000 stipend. She has also received the Worldstudio AIGA Scholarship and a scholarship from the Skowhegan School of Painting and Sculpture, an artists residency in Maine. Perry is the first recipient of MOCA Cleveland's Toby's Prize, valued at $50,000. In 2018 Perry also won the $28,000 Nam June Paik Award given by the Kunststiftung NRW arts foundation to honor artists working in media art.

=== Black Girl as a Landscape (2010) ===
In Perry's single-channel video installation, Black Girl as a Landscape, the camera slowly pans over the silhouette of a horizontally framed girl, abstracting her body. Perry states this intended to reflect her interest in "the possibility of abstraction as a way of creating dimensionality that connections individual bodies to larger visual and environmental ecologies."

=== Red Summer (2010) ===
This photo series depicts Perry's grandparents in their backyard obscured by smoke bombs. The photographs reflect the physical destruction seen in cities such as Washington and Chicago during the race riots of 1919, referred to as Red Summer.

=== Double Quadruple Etcetera Etcetera I (2013) ===
Exhibited at the Studio Museum in Harlem, Double Quadruple Etcetera Etcetera I showcases a 30-second loop of a man dancing in a white room looped over 9 minutes. The video was also featured in the Seattle Art Museum's show Disguise: Masks and Global African Art, which toured at the Fowler Museum at UCLA and the Brooklyn Museum in New York, after its Seattle debut. It is now available for public viewing at the Solomon R. Guggenheim Museum, as a part of their exhibition titled Going Dark: The Contemporary Figure at the Edge of Visibility from October 2023 until April 2024.

42 Black Panther Balloons on 125th Street (2014)

With an eye for both the humorous and the political, Perry created 42 Black Panther Balloons on 125th Street, in which she carried a bunch of mylar black panther balloons around town. One still shows the balloons held on a street corner in such a way that it both obscures the person holding them and merges with them to become what is described as an awkward and politically charged body . Some of the same kind of balloons are used in her single channel YouTube video, Black Panther Cam, of a smaller cluster of black panther mylar balloons floating in the artist's studio.

=== Lineage for a Multiple Monitor Workstation: Number One (2015) ===
This 26-minute two-channel video depicts identity as a construction that can be explored through ritual. Perry developed this piece as a narrative about her family, and includes family memories that are edited between song clips and computer effects.

=== Resident Evil (2016) ===
Graft and Ash for a Three Monitor Workstation (2016) at the Hirshhorn Museum and Sculpture Garden in 2022

Exhibited at The Kitchen in New York, NY. The show featured the video netherrrrrrrrrrrrrrrrrrrrrrrrrrrrrrrrrrrrrrrrrrrrrrrr 1.0.3 which juxtaposes images of the "blue screen of death" (which signifies a Windows operating system fatal error), law enforcement's "blue wall of silence", police raids, images of fifteen black women killed by police, Bill Gates dancing, and an avatar of Perry. The video resembles the role of bodies and labor in digital production, with the images of victims of police violence underscoring how violence done to one black body is done to all. The exhibit also featured a nine-minute performance with the work Graft and Ash for a Three Monitor Workstation (2016). The piece is an exercise bike with a triptych of screens attached, bringing viewers into an uncomfortably close proximity to the vertically arranged monitors. The video begins with an avatar of Perry set against a chroma blue backdrop, describing the details and components of the machine; the exercise bike is designed in a way that forces the sitter to contort their body unnaturally, making it difficult and exhausting to actually cycle. Perry's avatar then tells the viewer of a scientific study in which black people who believe the world is fair are more prone to chronic illnesses. Perry utilizes AI in Graft and Ash for a Three Monitor Workstation to illustrate how race and body politics are woefully mechanized. She frames technology as it allows us to dehumanize one another yet again, flattening race history and political context out in favor of a spectrum of slottable markers like age, class, and education.Resident Evil is the titular video from the exhibit which examines the media's take on blackness. There is footage of the 2015 riots after the death of Freddie Gray in Baltimore. One of the protestors yells at Geraldo Rivera for covering the protests and not the circumstances of Freddie Gray's death. Later on, Perry enters her family home with Eartha Kitt singing "I Want to Be Evil" on the television.

=== Eclogue For Inhabitability (2017) ===
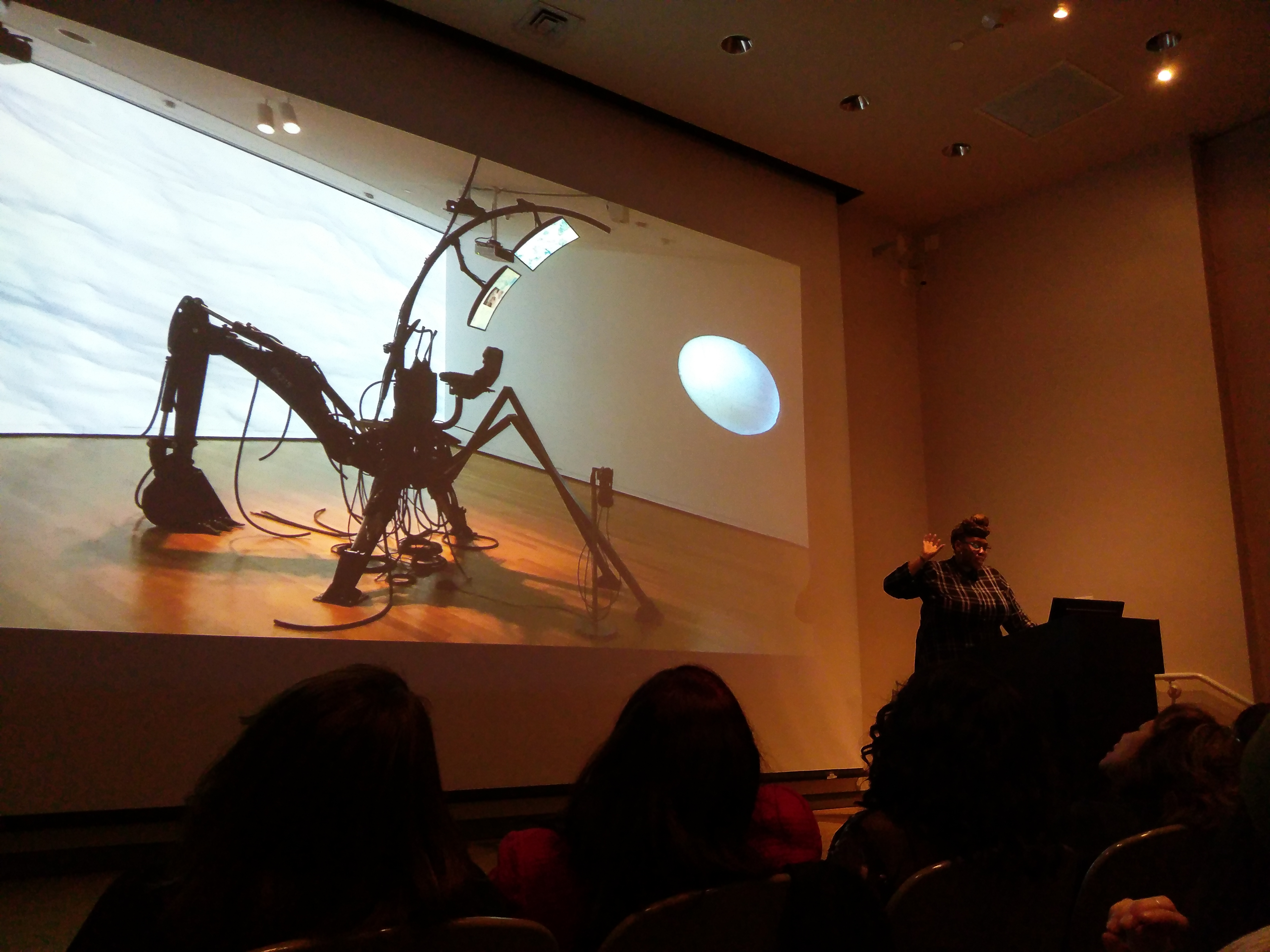
Sondra Perry at Seattle Art Museum in 2017, lecturing for her exhibition Eclogue For Inhabitability.

In 2017 Perry won the Gwendolyn Knight and Jacob Lawrence Prize, for which she presented her solo exhibition Eclogue For Inhabitability at the Seattle Art Museum. The prize included this solo exhibition, as well as a $10,000 grant. This was the first time in the history of the prize that a video artist had been awarded.

"At Bridget Donahue, in a room painted chroma key blue (used in video post-production in the same manner as a “green screen”), the artist shows sculptures alongside a video that focuses on Perry's twin brother, Sandy. In a widely publicized scandal, Sandy was among a number of student-athletes whose similarities and stats were licensed, without their consent, by the National Collegiate Athletic Association to a video game developer. In Perry's video, we see Sandy's video game character navigate The Met and British Museum, juxtaposed with 3D renderings of artifacts found in those museums. We're living in the midst of a digital revolution in which our very existence can be virtually reproduced and sold as digital avatars. But Perry shows us that this kind of identity and cultural theft isn't necessarily new."

=== Typhoon coming on (2018) ===
Perry exhibited a new soundscape at the Serpentine Sackler Gallery to accompany an adapted version of her piece Wet and Wavy Looks – Typhoon coming on (2016). Typhoon coming on was inspired by JMW Turner's famous 1840 painting of The Slave Ship, a painting depicting the Zong massacre of 1781 where the captain of a British ship threw 133 enslaved people overboard in pursuit of economic compensation through the ships's insurance policy. Perry digitally manipulates The Slave Ship to replicate ripples of skin, reclaiming black history from a forgetful past. The piece was created using the open source animation software Blender.

=== A Terrible Thing (2019) ===
In 2019, Perry exhibited A Terrible Thing at the Museum of Contemporary Art Cleveland. This exhibit depicts a narrative of the labor and environment that are put into the production of exhibitions and it highlights the circumstances that surround urban development projects. The idea originated from her research into blacksmithing's history and how it is formed as a highly skilled labor and it's the base that creates the building blocks of infrastructure and architecture.

Her work features prominently in the Guggenheim Museum (New York) exhibition "Going Dark: Contemporary Figure at the Edge of Visibility" which runs through April 7th, 2024. Her "Graft and Ash for a Three Monitor Workstation" has pride of place at the very top of the museum ramp, and other works, including her films, are interspersed throughout the exhibit.
