= Yu Gu =

American film producer

- Born: Chongqing
- Occupation: Film producer

Yu Gu is a Canadian-American filmmaker with a focus on the individual's relationship to society. Her film A Woman's Work: The NFL's Cheerleader Problem debuted at Tribeca in 2019.

Yu was born in Chongqing and raised in Vancouver. She became interested in the story of Lacy Thibodeaux-Fields after reading about her case in the LA Times. Thibodeaux-Fields, a cheerleader with the Los Angeles Raiders, had hired Oakland employment attorney Sharon Vinick to check her contract. Vinick is quoted in the film: "There are more provisions in here that are illegal then any contract I know of. After filing a class action suit against her employer, Thibodeaux-Fields' case made the news.

Yu got to know American football culture during her life as a student in California. She was shocked to learn about the gender pay gap the cheerleaders experienced, and met Thibodeaux-Fields and her attorney initially with the idea of making a film about Thibodeaux-Fields while following the progression of the case. She said, "In the beginning I thought this was just going to be about one woman". During the next four years, the case and the film took a different direction.
