= Nina Danino =

- Born: 1955 (age 70–71); Gibraltar
- Education: St. Martin's School of Art, Royal College of Art
- Known for: Experimental filmmaking
- Notable work: Temenos (1998), Stabat Mater (1990), "Now I am yours" (1992)
- Website: http://www.ninadanino.co.uk

Nina Danino (born 1955) is an experimental filmmaker and academic from Gibraltar, known for work that incorporates aspects of psychoanalysis and art and draws on the cultural heritage of Gibraltar.

== Early life and education ==
Danino was born in Gibraltar in 1955. She moved to London, England for post-secondary studies at the St. Martin's School of Art (Foundation, 1973–74; BA Hons Fine Art, 1974–77), later pursuing her MA in Environmental Media at the Royal College of Art (1979–81).

== Career ==
Nina Danino worked for a number of years as a film and video editor and assistant for documentary programmes at the BBC and elsewhere. Her films have been screened at venues such as the Lux Prize and National Film Theatre. In addition to her filmmaking, Danino has worked as a writer, educator and sound artist, creating soundtracks to a number of films. She was co-editor of the experimental film journal Undercut from 1986 to 1990 and edited an anthology based on writings from the journal in 2003. Danino has taught at Sheffield Hallam University, Camberwell College of Art, and the Architectural Association School of Architecture. She has been a Reader in Fine Art at Goldsmiths College, University of London since 2000. In 2016, Danino's work was featured in a series of screenings at Tate Modern focusing on women filmmakers of the London Film-makers’ Co-op.

== Works ==
- Maria (2023)
- Solitude (2022)
- I Die of Sadness Crying for You (2019)
- Jennifer (2015)
- Temenos (1998)
- Stabat Mater (1990)
- "Now I am yours" (1992)
