= Belit sağ =

belit sağ
- Born: Ankara, Turkey
- Known for: video art, activism

belit sağ (born 1980) is a videographer and visual artist from Turkey, and based in Amsterdam. She studied mathematics in Ankara and audio-visual arts in Amsterdam. She co-initiated projects like Kara Haber (2000–2007) and bak.ma. She has been a vocal opponent of censorship within Turkey through the early twenty-first century, publishing a widely read anti-censorship article in 2016.

== Career ==
sağ completed a residency in International Studio and Curatorial Program, New York in 2016. Screenings and exhibitions include: documenta, and the Toronto International Film Festival.

In January 2018, the artist opened her first solo exhibition, "Let Me Remember" at Squeaky Wheel Buffalo Media Arts Center. sağ's work was also included on the same year in the Flaherty NYC series "Common Visions" presented at Anthology Film Archives.

== Filmography ==
=== Short films ===
Year	Title	Notes
2010	Absences	
2010	‘thank you’	
2010	TURKS!	
2010	Feng Shui	
2011	Anti-Stockholm	
2011	Past Forward	
2011	‘god forbid!’	
2011	Black-Out	
2012	The First Day of Superman	
2013	You Loved Her	
2014	K1llth3gr00m	
2014	Buluntu (Found)	
2014	Soma’dan sesler	documentary
2014	Lost	
2014	And the Image Gazes Back	
2015	What a Beautiful Voice, Act 1	
2015	My Camera Seems to Recognize People	
2015	Eylül – Ekim 2015, Cizre/Sept. – Oct. 2015, Cizre	
2016	A Yhan and Me	
2016	Disruption	
2016	Grain	
2017	If You Say It Forty Times...	
2018	Cut-out	
2019	what remains	
