= A Woman's Work: The NFL's Cheerleader Problem =

- Directed by: Yu Gu
- Written by: Elizabeth Ai
- Produced by: Yu Gu; Elizabeth Ai
- Starring: Maria Pinzone; Lacy Thibodeaux-Fields; Darci Burrell; Sharon Vinick; Leslie Levy; Sean Cooney
- Cinematography: Yu Gu
- Edited by: Victoria Chalk
- Music by: Allyson Newman
- Release date: May 1, 2019 (Tribeca)
- Countries: United States; United Kingdom
- Language: English

A Woman's Work: The NFL's Cheerleader Problem is a 2019 documentary film directed by filmmaker Yu Gu. The film examines problems such as wage theft and illegal employment that are faced by cheerleaders in the National Football League.

== Synopsis ==
The film follows the stories of two former cheerleaders; Lacy Thibodeaux-Fields, of the Los Angeles Raiderettes and Maria Pinzone, of the Buffalo Jills as they filed lawsuits against their teams for unlawful employment policies, bias, and pay discrimination.

== See also ==
- National Football League cheerleading
- Feminism in the United States
- Me Too movement
- Gender pay gap
