= Genevieve Belleveau =

American artist and singer

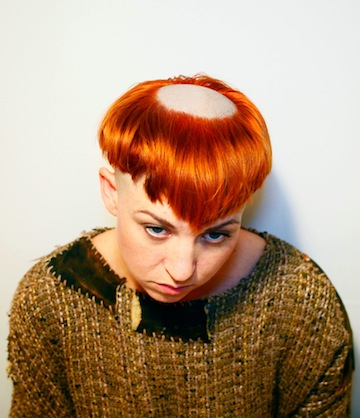
- Born: 1984 (age 41–42); Bemidji, Minnesota
- Education: Bennington College
- Known for: Performance art
- Notable work: Emoji Autism Facial Recognition Therapy

Genevieve Belleveau (also known as gorgeousTaps) (born 1984) is an American performance artist and singer based in New York City and Los Angeles. Belleveau is best known for her relational art pieces which involve the audience in the art. She confronts within her work issues of human connection, technology and religious ritual. She was also a driver of a Mister Softee ice cream truck and has managed operations for the Big Gay Ice Cream Truck.

== Early life ==
Belleveau was born in Bemidji but grew up in the village of Puposky, Minnesota. She attended Bennington College and earned a Bachelor of Arts in Performance art in 2007. She moved to New York City in 2008 and secured a job driving a Mister Softee Ice Cream truck from which she created performance art, music, and photography.

== Work ==
In 2009 she began her backyard performance series, The Church of gorgeousTaps and the Reality Show which used the traditional structure of a Lutheran Mass in a secular celebration of the creative process. Belleveau's work was scouted by Lilith Performance Studio in Malmo, Sweden who invited her to produce a series of performances in an exact replica of her Greenpoint backyard apartment. She went on to create similar services in Rotterdam, Netherlands and New York City.

After working with the church she developed in 2011, the idea of producing a reality television show that happened entirely within the Facebook interface. She collaborated with artist and VH1 reality star Ann Hirsch in creating a web-based performance that would mimic the style of a reality television show.

In her 2013 piece, Emoji Autism Facial Recognition Therapy examined common misinterpretations people make with emojis and she created a chart cataloging the emotions, as dictated by Siri. Belleveau had a corresponding performance in which hypothetical (and emotional) scenarios are given and you must use the limited emojis to communicate your feelings, this was used in the context of explaining how autism works.

In 2013 she began an Indiegogo campaign to fund the purchase of an RV Motorhome which she called The Mobile Monastery. She cut her hair in a monk tonsure to promote the project, and traveled from New Orleans to Los Angeles in the motorhome, examining the intersection of technology, attention and solitude.

In 2014 she introduced her Sacred Sadism floral healing practice which draws from both BDSM and alternative therapeutic methods as a form of private performance.

=== Sacred Sadism ===
In 2018, Belleveau and her partner Themba Alleyne expanded on her social practice art piece Sacred Sadism, creating a conceptual BDSM tool company under the same name. Each impact play object is made with salvaged wood (hand-carved by Alleyne), copper, and high-quality plant replicas. The line aims to explore the spiritual, creative, and earth-based side of kink, transforming preconceptions of S&M while making it more accessible to all.

== See also ==
- Avant-garde
- Experimental theatre
- Feminist art
- Performance art
