= Nathan W. Hill =

American historical linguist (born 1979)

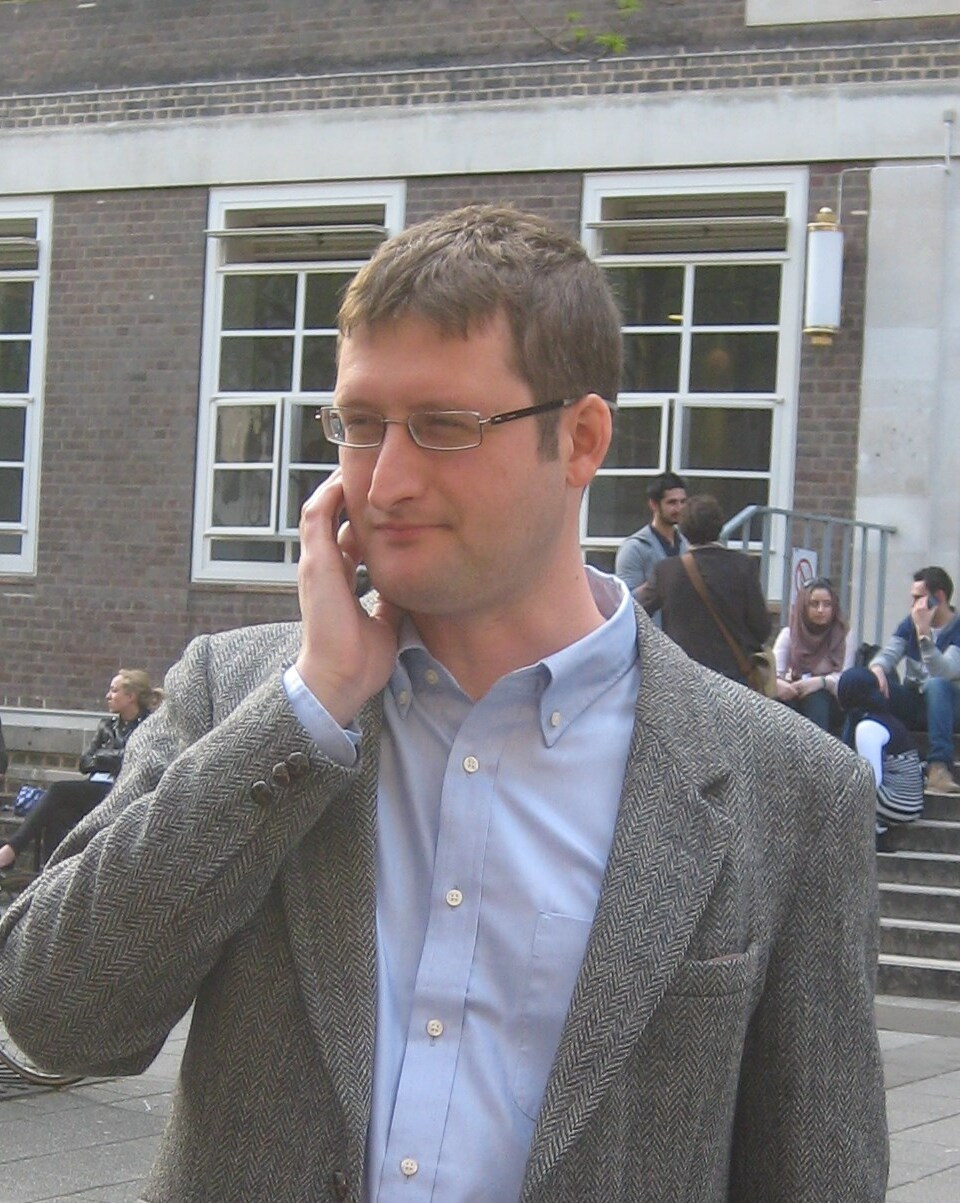
- Hill at SOAS in 2013
- Born: Nathan Wayne Hill; July 8, 1979 (age 47)

Academic background
- Education: Harvard University
- Doctoral advisor: Leonard van der Kuijp

Academic work
- Discipline: Linguist
- Institutions: SOAS University of London; Trinity College Dublin
- Main interests: Sino-Tibetan languages; Historical linguistics

Nathan Wayne Hill (born July 8, 1979) is an American historical linguist and Tibetologist specializing in languages of the Sino-Tibetan family, in particular Tibetic languages.

He is Sam Lam Professor in Chinese Studies and director of the Trinity Centre for Asian Studies at Trinity College Dublin. He was previously reader in Tibetan and historical linguistics at SOAS, East Asian Languages and Cultures, and served as head of department from 2017 to 2019.

He is particularly well known for his work on comparative Sino-Tibetan, Old Tibetan philology, as well as linguistic typology (especially mirativity and evidentiality).

From 2014 to 2020, Hill was a principal investigator on Beyond Boundaries: Religion, Region, Language and the State, a project funded by the European Research Council and hosted by the British Museum. During the academic year 2015–2016 he was a visiting professor at the University of California, Berkeley, and in 2020–2021 at Oxford's Oriental Institute.

== Works ==
- Hill, Nathan W. (2010a), "Overview of Old Tibetan synchronic phonology" (PDF), Transactions of the Philological Society, 108 (2): 110–125, CiteSeerX 10.1.1.694.8283, doi:10.1111/j.1467-968X.2010.01234.x, archived (PDF) from the original on 28 July 2013.
- —— (2010b), "Personal pronouns in Old Tibetan" (PDF), Journal Asiatique, 298 (2): 549–571, doi:10.2143/JA.298.2.2062444, archived (PDF) from the original on 1 August 2013.
- —— (2011), "The allative, locative, and terminative cases (la-don) in the Old Tibetan Annals", New Studies in the Old Tibetan Documents: Philology, History and Religion (PDF), Old Tibetan Documents Online Monograph Series, vol. 3, Tokyo: Research Institute for Languages and Cultures of Asia and Africa, Tokyo University of Foreign Studies, pp. 3–38, archived from the original (PDF) on 2020-11-05.
- —— (2012). "Tibetan -las, -nas, and -bas" (PDF). Cahiers de Linguistique Asie Orientale. 41 (1): 3–38. doi:10.1163/1960602812X00014. Archived from the original (PDF) on 2015-09-09.
- Hill, Nathan W. (2012). "'Mirativity' does not exist: ḥdug in 'Lhasa' Tibetan and other suspects". Linguistic Typology. 16 (3): 389–433. CiteSeerX 10.1.1.694.8358. doi:10.1515/lity-2012-0016. S2CID 55007142.
- Hill, Nathan W. (2012), "The six vowel hypothesis of Old Chinese in comparative context", Bulletin of Chinese Linguistics, 6 (2): 1–69, doi:10.1163/2405478x-90000100.
- —— (2014), "Cognates of Old Chinese *-n, *-r, and *-j in Tibetan and Burmese", Cahiers de Linguistique Asie Orientale, 43 (2): 91–109, doi:10.1163/19606028-00432p02, S2CID 170371949
- Hill, Nathan W. (2015). "Hare lõ: the touchstone of mirativity". SKASE Journal of Theoretical Linguistics. 13 (2): 24–31.
- Hill, Nathan W., ed. (2012), Mediaeval Tibeto-Burman Languages IV. Leiden and Boston: Brill.
- Gawne, Lauren; Hill, Nathan W., eds. (2017), Evidential Systems of Tibetan Languages, Studies and Monographs [TiLSM], vol. 302, Berlin: De Gruyter Mouton
- Hill, Nathan W. (2019), The Historical Phonology of Tibetan, Burmese, and Chinese, Cambridge: Cambridge University Press, ISBN 9781107146488.
