= Squeaky Wheel Buffalo Media Arts Center =

Arts center in Buffalo, New York

Squeaky Wheel Film & Media Art Center
- Established: 1985
- Type: 501(c)(3) nonprofit
- Tax ID no.: 22-2970899
- Legal status: corporation
- Professional title: Buffalo Media Resources Inc.
- Headquarters: 2495 Main Street, Suite 310, Buffalo, NY, 14214
- Region served: Western New York
- Website: https://squeaky.org/

Squeaky Wheel Film & Media Art Center (Buffalo Media Resources Inc.) is a non-profit, media arts center based in Buffalo, New York. Founded in 1985, the organization provides the Western New York region with low-cost media equipment rentals, media arts education for youth and adults, residencies for artists and researchers, and exhibitions, screenings, and other public programming. Since 2017, Squeaky Wheel has been certified by Working Artists and the Greater Economy (W.A.G.E.). Squeaky Wheel's Workspace Residency supports artists and researchers working on media arts projects by providing access to facilities, equipment, technical consultation, and public presentation opportunities.

== Partnership ==
Squeaky Wheel has maintained ongoing collaborations with the University at Buffalo, particularly through programs that connect media education with community outreach. For example, joint initiatives have included technology and arts programs designed to address gaps in access to digital tools, especially among underrepresented youth. These collaborations have involved faculty and students from media study programs working alongside Squeaky Wheel staff to provide mentorship, workshops, and hands-on production experience.

== Past exhibitions ==
- Wenhua Shi. A Year from Monday. June–September 2016.
- Kathy High. Soft Science: Science Fictions by Kathy High. November 2016–January 2017.
- Sondra Perry. flesh out. January–May 2018.
- Angela Washko. The Game: The Game 2.0. September–December 9, 2017.
- belit sağ. Let Me Remember. January–April 2018.
