= A Rising Fury =

2023 Ukrainian documentary film

- Theatrical release poster
- Ukrainian: Гартовані люттю
- Directed by: Lesya Kalynska, Ruslan Batytsky
- Written by: Lesya Kalynska, TJ Collins
- Produced by: Lesya Kalynska, Ruslan Batytskyi, TJ Collins, Jonathan Borge Lie
- Cinematography: Ruslan Batytskyi
- Edited by: Araby Kelley
- Music by: Emiliano Mazzenga, Mariana Sadovska, Roman Turovsky, Svyatoslav Vakarchuk
- Release date: 2022
- Running time: 90 minutes
- Countries: Ukraine, USA, Norway
- Languages: Ukrainian; English; Russian

A Rising Fury (Ukrainian: Гартовані люттю, romanized: Hartovani liuttiu) is a 2022 Ukrainian documentary film directed by Ukrainian American director and producer Lesya Kalynska and Ukrainian filmmaker Ruslan Batytsky. It was produced by TJ Collins (USA) and Jonathan Borge Lie (Norway). A Rising Fury garnered international acclaim, and was longlisted for the 2024 Academy Awards in the Best Feature Documentary category.

== Synopsis ==
A Rising Fury follows two hopeful Ukrainian idealists from the Euromaidan protests in Kyiv in 2013 to the full-scale Russian invasion of Ukraine in 2022. The film traces the journey of Pavlo and Svitlana, two young Ukrainian idealists in love, forever changed by war. Filmed in the verité style, covering the period from Kyiv’s 2013 Revolution to Russia’s 2022 invasion, the documentary journeys through the historic events that set the stage for Europe’s most devastating war in generations. After losing his family home in Russian-occupied Donetsk, Pavlo joins the Ukrainian military. A treacherous betrayal by a close friend reveals a deep deception and exposes a long-hidden covert operation behind Russia’s invasion. While fighting for their country, the young couple is faced with tough life choices. The film is a testament to love, courage, and the human spirit.

The film also features Vadym Vasylchuk, the Maidan commander who became a deputy in the Kyiv City Council and in 2022 joined the Ukrainian Defense Forces. The film includes historical footage with John McCain, Igor Lapin, Les Podervianskyi, Svyatoslav Vakarchuk, Ivan Lenyo and the band Kozak System.

== Production ==
A Rising Fury was written by Lesya Kalynska and co-written by TJ Collins.

The film team followed their subjects for nearly ten years, from the Revolution of Dignity in 2013 to the battlefields in Eastern Ukraine during the full-scale invasion in 2022. It required multiple expeditions to the front lines and extensive filming in Kyiv. The production avoided any government funding to maintain editorial independence.

== Soundtrack ==
The film's soundtrack features original score by Emiliano Mazzenga, and includes music by Mariana Sadovska, Roman Turovsky, Mykola Leontovych and Svyatoslav Vakarchuk.

== Release ==
A Rising Fury made its World Premiere at the 2022 Tribeca Film Festival with a special presentation at Lincoln Center – Walter Reade Theater.

=== Online release ===
An updated and extended version of A Rising Fury was released worldwide and became available for streaming (on Apple TV+, Amazon, et al) on August 1, 2025.

=== Festival release ===
The World Premiere of A Rising Fury took place at the Tribeca Film Festival in 2022 with a special presentation at Lincoln Center – Walter Reade Theater. The International Premiere took place at the Warsaw International Film Festival, Poland; the Ukrainian premiere took place at the Odesa International Film Festival, hosted in Poland due to the war in Ukraine; the Scandinavian Premiere was at the Stockholm International Film Festival, Sweden; the Asian premiere was at the Nepal Human Rights Film Festival, and the Australian premiere took place at the Melbourne Documentary Film Festival. The film was selected by many prestigious international film festivals and screened across four continents.

=== Theatrical release ===
A Rising Fury had a limited theatrical release in New York City at Cinema Village movie theater from October 27 to November 2, 2023. The theatrical premiere commemorated the 10-year anniversary of the Revolution of Dignity in Ukraine, and featured a talk with the historian Timothy Snyder. A Rising Fury also had a limited theatrical release in Los Angeles at the TCL Chinese 6 Theatres on February 22, 2024.

== Reception ==
It received numerous reviews from publications such as Film Threat, Film Ink, Filmmaker Magazine, Modern Times Review, Cinema Sentries, and The Independent Critic.

=== Awards ===
A Rising Fury has had 5 wins and 6 nominations:

- Cleveland International Film Festival: 2023 Nominee Greg Gund Memorial Standing Up Award
- Stockholm Film Festival: 2022 Nominee Bronze Horse Best Documentary
- Warsaw International Film Festival: 2022 Nominee Documentary Competition Best Documentary Feature
- Oslo Films from the South Festival: 2022 Nominee DOC: South Award Best Documentary
- Odesa International Film Festival: 2022 Nominee Golden Duke National Competition Program
- Melbourne Documentary Film Festival: 2023 Winner Jury Award - Supreme Jury Prize for Feature Documentary, 2023 Winner Audience Award - Best International Documentary, Best International Director
- Buffalo International Film Festival: 2022 Winner Festival Award
- El Ojo Cojo International Film Festival: 2023 Winner Honorable Mention - Feature Film
- Santorini Film Festival: 2023 Nominee Best Film - Best Feature Documentary

== See also ==
- List of submissions to the 96th Academy Awards for Best International Feature Film
- List of Ukrainian submissions for the Academy Award for Best International Feature Film
