= Ann Hirsch =

American artist

- Born: 1985 (age 40–41)
- Education: Washington University in St. Louis, Syracuse University
- Known for: Video and performance art

Ann Hirsch (born 1985) is a contemporary American video and performance artist. Her work addresses women's sexual self-expression and identity online and in popular culture.

== Early life ==
Hirsch received a BFA in sculpture from the Sam Fox School of Design & Visual Arts at Washington University in St. Louis in 2007, and an MFA in Video Art from Syracuse University in 2010.

== Work ==
In 2008, Hirsch initiated the "Scandalishious" project, a series of videos posted to her YouTube account, "Caroline's fun fun channel." Using her computer to record herself, Hirsch performed as Caroline Benton, a SUNY freshman. Many of the clips show Caroline dancing to music ranging from MGMT to Katy Perry to Meat Loaf. In other videos, Caroline reads poetry or confides to her viewers about her personal life. The channel has reached over one million views. Of her motivation in creating "Scandalishious," Hirsch has said,

While I was growing up and becoming a woman, I hated myself. I knew I was smart but other than that I thought I was just a disgusting girl that no one could be sexually interested in. I started performing as "Scandalishious" because I was tired of feeling that way. Or at least, I was tired of appearing as though I felt that way. So I started pretending I thought I was sexy and I quickly learned that if I pretended to be confident, people would believe it. And then I actually became more confident as a result.

Hirsch also went on to display and discuss segments of the "Scandalishious" project in galleries.

In 2010, Hirsch was a participant on the VH1 reality TV show Frank the Entertainer in a Basement Affair. Hirsch went by "Annie," one of fifteen women trying to win over Frank Maresca, himself a former reality TV contestant on I Love New York 2 and I Love Money. Hirsch's incentive in joining the show was to create a performance piece and to investigate the derogatory stereotypes surrounding women who vie for publicity. Hirsch's participation on Frank the Entertainer highlighted the nebulous line between performance and reality. She found herself cast as "the nice girl," and realized "the non-sexualization of my character, both through my own doing and through careful editing...rendered me an inadequate partner for Frank." To avoid this carefully packaged characterization, Hirsch performed an expletive-filled rap song and was promptly sent home. In an interview with Hirsch, Karen Archey suggested that reality TV itself was the medium for the performance. Even so, a compilation of clips of her appearances on the show along with her application video, entitled "Here For You (Or my Brief Love Affair With Frank Maresca," can be found on Hirsch's website. Hirsch also participated on the TV series Oddities.

After Hirsch's work with Frank the Entertainer ended, in 2011 she collaborated with performance artist Genevieve Belleveau (also known as gorgeousTaps) to create The Reality Show with gorgeousTaps. Hirsch's work with and on reality TV manipulates stereotypical tropes into which women are cast and likewise considers the power of affect (emotion) within an attention economy.

As a teen in the late 1990s, Hirsch developed a significant chatroom presence. Hirsch's "Playground," a play about a coming of age for which she was awarded a Rhizome commission, teenage girl engaging in a relationship with an adult man through an internet chatroom, debuted in 2013. The set of "Playground" consists of two desks where the actors sit at computers, appearing to chat with each other, while the textual component of their conversation is projected onto the wall behind them. The play was inspired by Hirsch's own teenage experience of meeting and engaging in a multi-year online relationship with an older man. The play was debuted at the New Museum and was presented by South London Gallery at Goldsmiths College. Hirsch also collaborated with designer James LaMarre to produce "Twelve," an app that recreated the now-defunct AOL chatrooms of Hirsch's adolescence. Though the app recreated the appearance of the interactive chatroom space, an app-user would be met with a pre-conceived narrative of a young girl chatting with an older man. Hirsch explained, "My point with telling this story is just to be honest and convey both the benefits I got from this relationship (intimacy, sexual knowledge) but also show the manipulation and exploitation that was involved in a relationship like this as well." The app was eventually banned by the iTunes Store.

Hirsch participated in "Body Anxiety," a 2015 online exhibition featuring work by video and performance artists based on questions of the female body through the lens of the internet.

Hirch worked as an artist in residence at Yaddo, the Lower Manhattan Cultural Council, and Atlantic Center for the Arts. Her most recent works include shows at the MIT List Visual Arts Center and the New Museum's online project space First Look.
