= Lesya Kalynska =

Ukrainian-born filmmaker

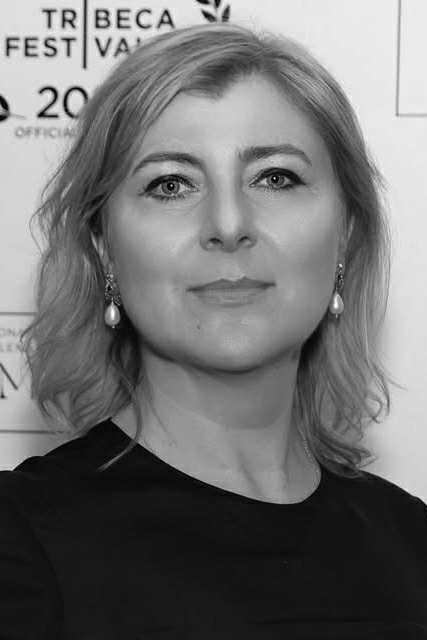
Kalynska in 2023

Lesya Kalynska (born in 1972) is a Ukrainian-born film director, screenwriter, and producer based in New York City where she leads her own production company, Pomegranate Studios. Kalynska is best known for writing, directing, and producing feature documentary A Rising Fury, which had its world premiere at Tribeca Film Festival and was long-listed for the 96th Academy Awards.

== Biography ==
Kalynska was born in 1972 in Kyiv into a family of biochemists. Her father Michael (Mykhaylo) Kalinski was a professor of sports biochemistry and nutrition at the National University of Ukraine in Physical Education and Sport in Kyiv. He became a political refugee and moved to New York City. He was one of the first whistleblowers about the steroid abuse in soviet Olympic Sports. Michael Kalinski published several pioneering articles on this subject in the Western press.

Kalynska holds an MFA in Film Directing and Writing from New York University's Tisch School of the Arts as well as a PhD in Slavic Studies from Kyiv University in Ukraine. She has authored screenplays, and scholarly articles on the subject of postmodernism in literature, as well as journalistic articles on film and music. Early in her career, Kalynska worked in various creative roles, including producing, writing, editing, and acting. In 2008, she worked for the director Oles Sanin in developing the script of his film The Guide. Since 2013, Kalynska has divided her time between the U.S. and Ukraine. She is involved in cultural diplomacy, traveling internationally to promote Ukraine causes.

== Filmography ==
- The Driven (2022)
- A Rising Fury (2022)
- Salt In The Air (2013)
- Ukrainian Lessons (2013)
- Helen (2013) - nominated for the Golden Duke at the Odesa International Film Festival 2013
- The Green Jacket (2013)
- Ama at Sea (2010)
- The Balloonist (2007)
- Niko (2006)
- The Debt (2006)
- In the Land of the Lost Crusaders
