= Nate Hill (artist) =

American artist (born 1977)

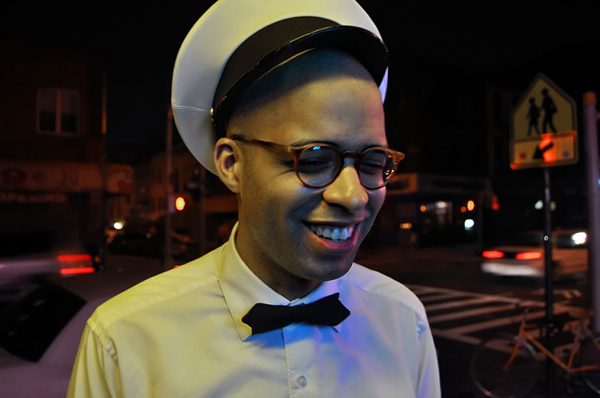
- Hill in 2011
- Born: September 6, 1977 (age 48)
- Occupation: Performance Artist
- Website: Instagram

Nate Hill (born September 6, 1977) is an American performance artist. He is based in East Harlem, NYC.

== Biography ==
Some of Hill's most well-known works have been Death Bear, White Power Milk, and Trophy Scarves. Hill has been featured in numerous publications including Vice, Huffington Post, Hyperallergic, Wall Street Journal, BlackBook, and The New York Times.

Hill's art is often confrontational, described as "[poking] holes into people’s ideas of comfort and [forcing] them to negotiate how far they are willing to go." He adapts personas in social spaces such as Twitter or Tumblr that address issues of race, class, and power.

Hill was a Blade of Grass Artist Fellows in 2013.
