= George Mallen =

British businessman and pioneer of creative computer systems

George L. Mallen FBCS FRSA
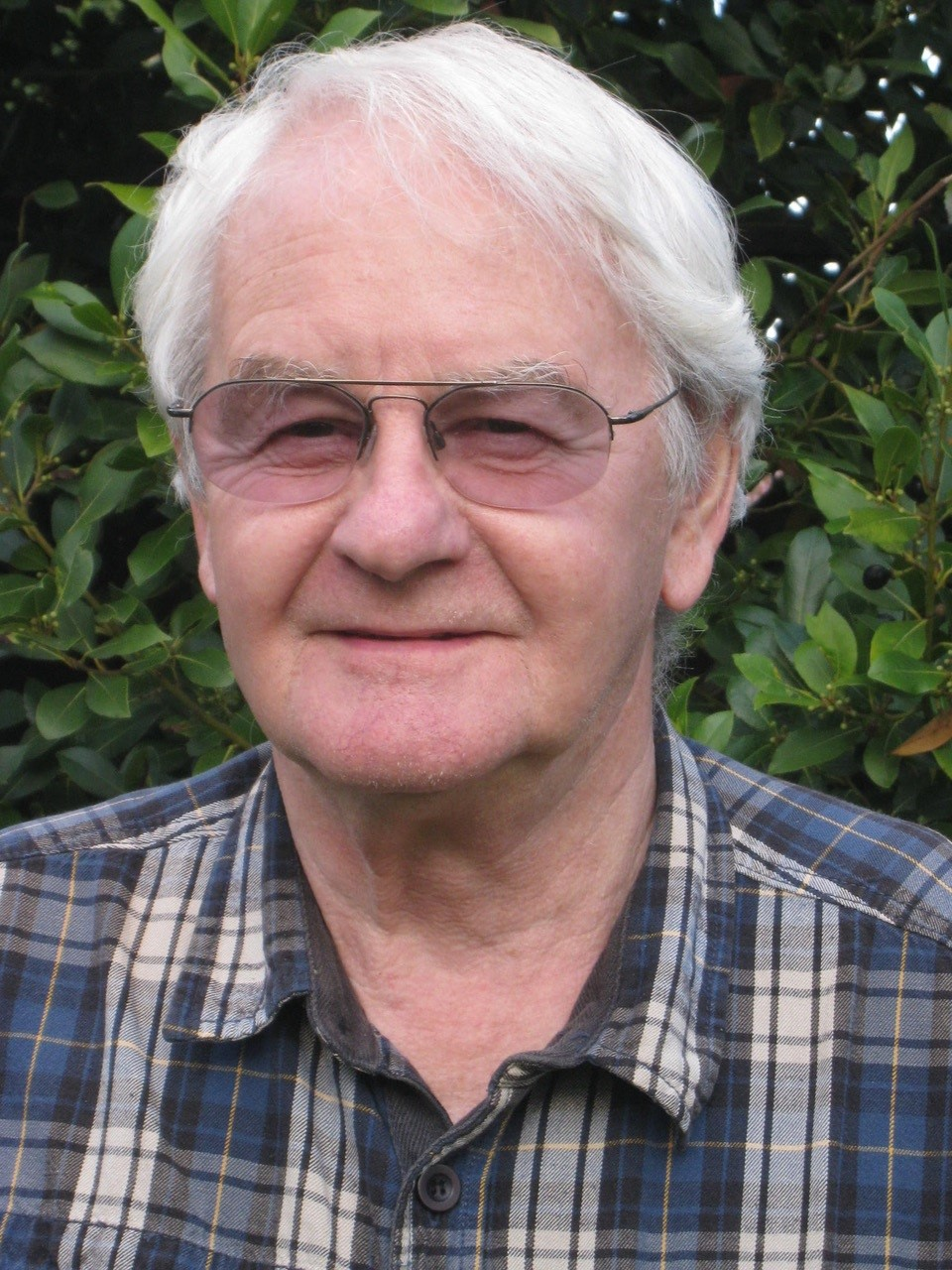
- Born: 1939 (age 86–87); Melrose, Scotland
- Education: University of Brighton
- Occupation: Company chair
- Years active: 1962 onwards
- Employer(s): System Research; System Simulation; Royal College of Art; Bournemouth University
- Organization: Computer Arts Society (1968 onwards)
- Known for: Event One (1969); Creative computing Computer graphics Computer arts
- Notable work: Ecogame (1970)
- Spouse: Sarah Mallen

George L. Mallen (born 1939) is a British businessman who has been a pioneer of creative computer systems since 1962. He co-founded the Computer Arts Society (CAS) with Alan Sutcliffe and John Lansdown in 1968. In 1970, he led CAS members in creating Ecogame, the "first digitally driven, multi-player, interactive gaming system in the UK". Also in 1970, he founded the company System Simulation Ltd, one of the longest established software companies in the United Kingdom.

== Early life ==
George Mallen was born in Melrose, Scottish Borders. He studied Physics at the University of Brighton, England, receiving his degree in 1962.

== Career ==
Mallen's first involvement with computer simulation was at the Royal Aircraft Establishment, working on air traffic control during 1962–3. Initially, he worked with the cybernetician and polymath Gordon Pask (1928–1996) at his company System Research Ltd, where he became a director, before himself founding the company System Simulation Ltd (SSL) in 1970. In parallel, Mallen held academic positions at the Royal College of Art in London (1971–1981), introducing computer graphics into teaching, and at Bournemouth University, where he was the founding head of the Department of Communication and Media, also introducing computer graphics there too.

In 1968, Mallen assisted with aspects of Pask's contributions to the early computer art exhibition Cybernetic Serendipity at the Institute of Contemporary Arts in London, curated by Jasia Reichardt. In 1976, Mallen and SSL were involved with computer-generated sequences for the 1979 Hollywood film Alien, directed by Ridley Scott.

Mallen was co-founder (in 1968), President, and later President Emeritus (from 2019) of the Computer Arts Society (CAS). In 1969, CAS organised the Event One digital art exhibition at the Royal College of Art (RCA). This was celebrated 50 years later at the RCA with Event Two, which Mallen also attended. Mallen was central to preserving the archives of the Computer Arts Society. These were originally stored at the System Simulation offices in Covent Garden, London, and these became the core of the CACHe ("Computer Art Context History Etc") Project at Birkbeck, University of London during 2002–05. This archive became an important part of the national collection of computer art at the Victoria and Albert Museum.

Mallen was a member and later honorary member of the EVA London Electronic Visualisation and the Arts conference organising committee under James Hemsley. He is a Fellow of the British Computer Society and the Royal Society of Arts.

In 2024, a book on Mallen's lifetime contributions to computer arts was published. The EVA London 2024 conference proceedings were dedicated to Mallen.

== Bibliography ==
- Mason, Catherine, ed. (2024). Creative Simulations: George Mallen and the Early Computer Arts Society. Springer Series on Cultural Computing. Springer Nature. doi:10.1007/978-3-031-50620-8. ISBN 978-3-031-50619-2.
