= Chris Drange =

German artist

- Born: Christoph David Drange; May 24, 1983 (age 43); Köthen (Anhalt), Germany
- Citizenship: Germany
- Education: University of Fine Arts Hamburg; Academy of Fine Arts Leipzig
- Occupation: Contemporary artist

Christoph David Drange (born 24 May 1983) is a German artist, best known for his use of digital found-objects in post-digital paintings of contemporary influencers and social media symbolism.

== Early life and education ==
Drange was born on May 24, 1983, in Köthen (Anhalt), Germany. Before moving to Berlin in 2009, he studied for two years at the International Center of Photography in New York and one year at the Art Students League of New York.

Drange enrolled at the University of Fine Arts in Hamburg to pursue a bachelor's degree in fine arts in 2015, and later obtained his master's degree in painting from the same university. He studied under Anselm Reyle, known for his large-scale abstract paintings and found-object sculptures.

== Work ==
Drange appropriates selfies from popular influencers and transforms them into classical oil paintings, often on large canvas. As a statement on authorship and originality, Drange doesn't paint any of his artwork. Instead, he creates sketches from various digital found-objects, with a strong preference for self-portrait photographs as source material, and sends them to an oil painting factory in China, where they are painted by hand on large-scale canvas. The amalgamation of selfies, emojis and other depictions of social media symbols are central to all of Drange's works.

Drange's work has appeared in several exhibitions and magazines such as the Kunstforum International, Numéro, Weserburg, and the Benaki Museum, as well as the exhibition "Link in Bio" at MDBK Leipzig and the international group show "The artist is online" at Galerie König, curated by Anika Meier and Johann König. He has exhibited with artists such as Thomas Webb, Petra Cortright, Arvida Byström, Chloe Wise, Gretchen Andrew, Daniel Arsham and Jonas Lund.

He Travelled to Venezuela in early 2013 and documented a socialist society that retains vestiges of capitalism.

== Publications ==
Drange is the author of two photobooks. The first, Hecho en Socialismo, was published in 2015 by Kerber Verlag and covered the phenomenon of a new socialist society in Venezuela that is tied up with remnants of capitalism. Relics, the second, was published in 2017 by Hatje Cantz and covered the relationship between celebrities and their Instagram followers.

== Personal life ==
Drange lives and works in both Hamburg and Berlin.
