= System Simulation =

Coordinates: 51°30′42″N 0°7′15″W

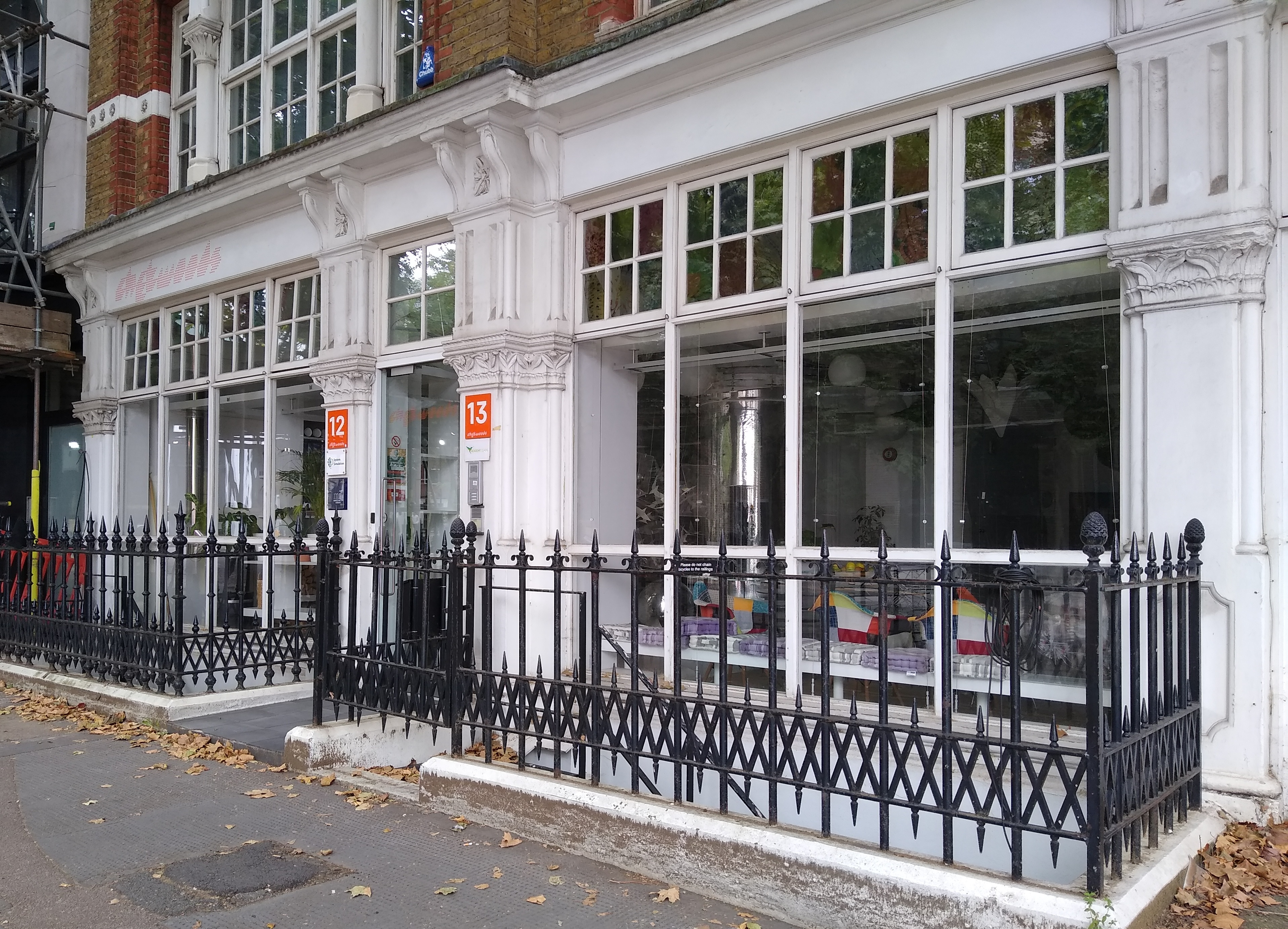
- System Simulation office in London
- Industry: software engineering
- Founded: 1970
- Founder: John Lansdown
- Headquarters: Covent Garden, Central London, England

System Simulation Ltd (SSL) is a software engineering company now specialising in text and multimedia information systems, based in Clerkenwell, central London, England, and founded in 1970 by George Mallen.

Under the chairmanship of John Lansdown, following collaborative research work at the Royal College of Art, System Simulation carried out pioneering computer animation work, applying computer graphics techniques in TV and film creating many advertising sequences, the flight deck instrumentation readouts on the Nostromo spaceship for Ridley Scott's Alien, and the animation of Martin Lambie-Nairn's original Channel 4 logo.

More recently System Simulation has specialised in museum information systems, commercial and archival image library systems, information management and delivery for publishers, news services and professional and commercial organisations. MuseumIndex+, the museum information management system, supports collections management, digital archives and interactive public access. Clients include the British Museum, London Transport Museum, the Victoria and Albert Museum, Getty Images, SCRAN (Scottish Cultural Resources Access Network) and Culture24. They develop content management systems, and CD-ROM/Web products and services for the publishing sector and for information service providers. The company provides technical support for the online services of Culture24, the UK's leading virtual museum resource.

The company has often hosted meetings of the Computer Arts Society.

== Awards won by company and their clients ==
- British Computer Society IT Award Winner 1994: PLATO-UK with Guy's and St Thomas' Hospital Trust and Royal Botanic Gardens, Kew
- British Computer Society IT Award Medallist 1995: ROCKnROM with Michael Wadleigh and Penguin Books
- British Computer Society IT Award Medallist 1996: Index+ software system.
- BT/New Statesman - Best education website 2001: The 24 Hour Museum http://www.culture24.org.uk/
- American Association of Museums Silver Muse Award 2001 - Excellence in the use of media and technology for collections database and research resource: SCRAN http://www.scran.ac.uk
- Institute of Information Scientists Jason Farradine Award 2001 - an outstanding piece of work in the information field: SCRAN http://www.scran.ac.uk
- National Library for the Blind Visionary Design Award 2002: The British Museum COMPASS website for accessibility to the visually impaired. www.thebritishmuseum.ac.uk/compass
- IVCA Biz Net Award Winner - Best public information website 2002: The 24 Hour Museum (since rebranded as "Culture24") http://www.culture24.org.uk/home
- BECTA/The Guardian UK Education Website Awards 2002 - shortlisted :SCRAN http://www.scran.ac.uk
- Museums and the Web, Culture 24 Best of the Web Winner in the category "long-lived" April 2010
- Europeana Foundation, Hack4Europe, Casual Curator winner in the category "Social Inclusion" June 2011
