= Andy Lomas =

British artist

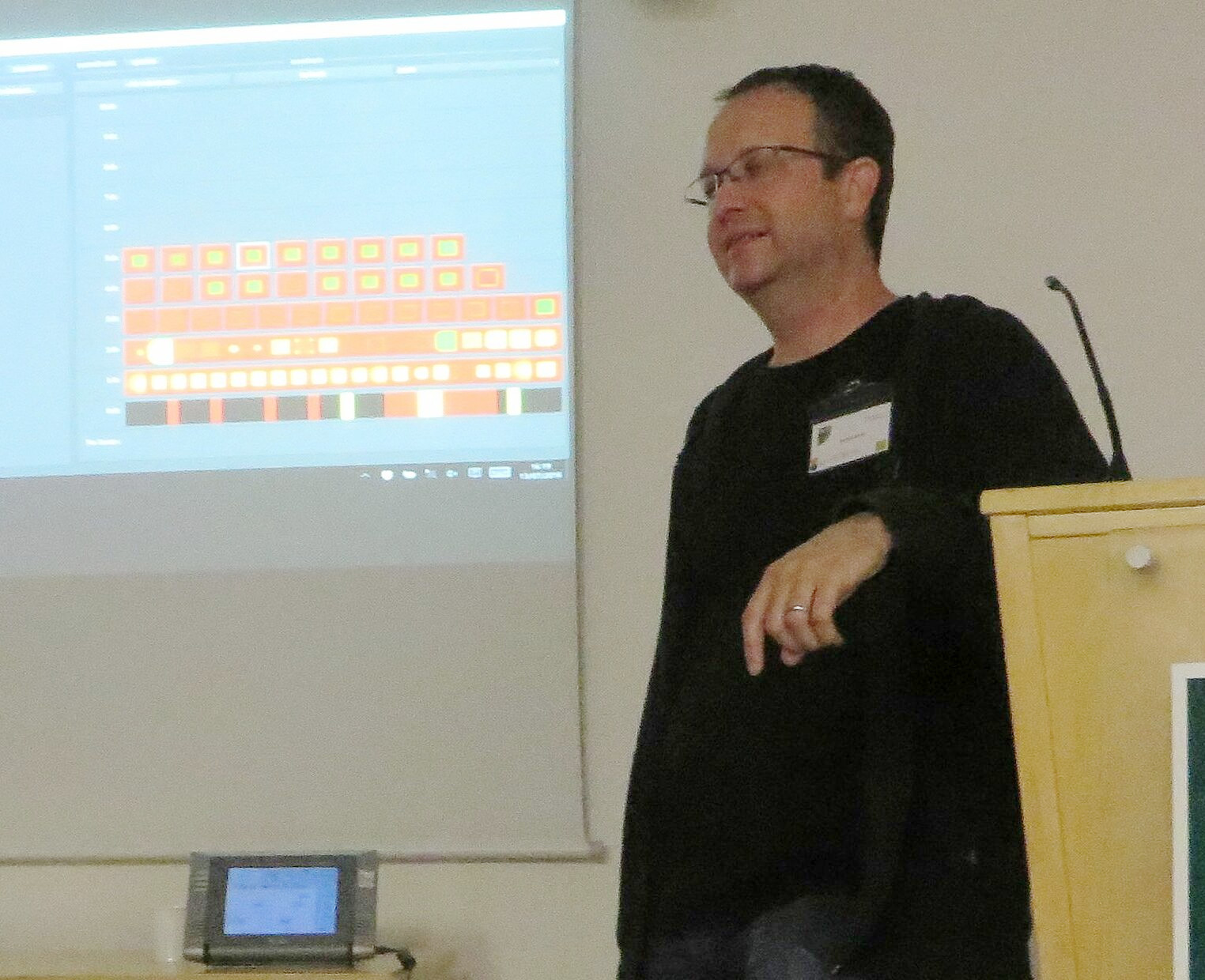
- Lomas presenting at the EVA London 2016 conference
- Born: Andrew Lomas; United Kingdom
- Known for: Algorithmic art, Digital art, Contemporary art, Mathematical art, Morphogenetic art, Visual effects
- Movement: Digital art
- Awards: 51st Primetime Emmy Awards Outstanding Special Visual Effects for a Miniseries or a Movie (1999); The Lumen Prize Gold Award (2014)
- Elected: University College London; Goldsmiths, University of London
- Patron(s): Victoria and Albert Museum; Computer Arts Society
- Website: www.andylomas.com

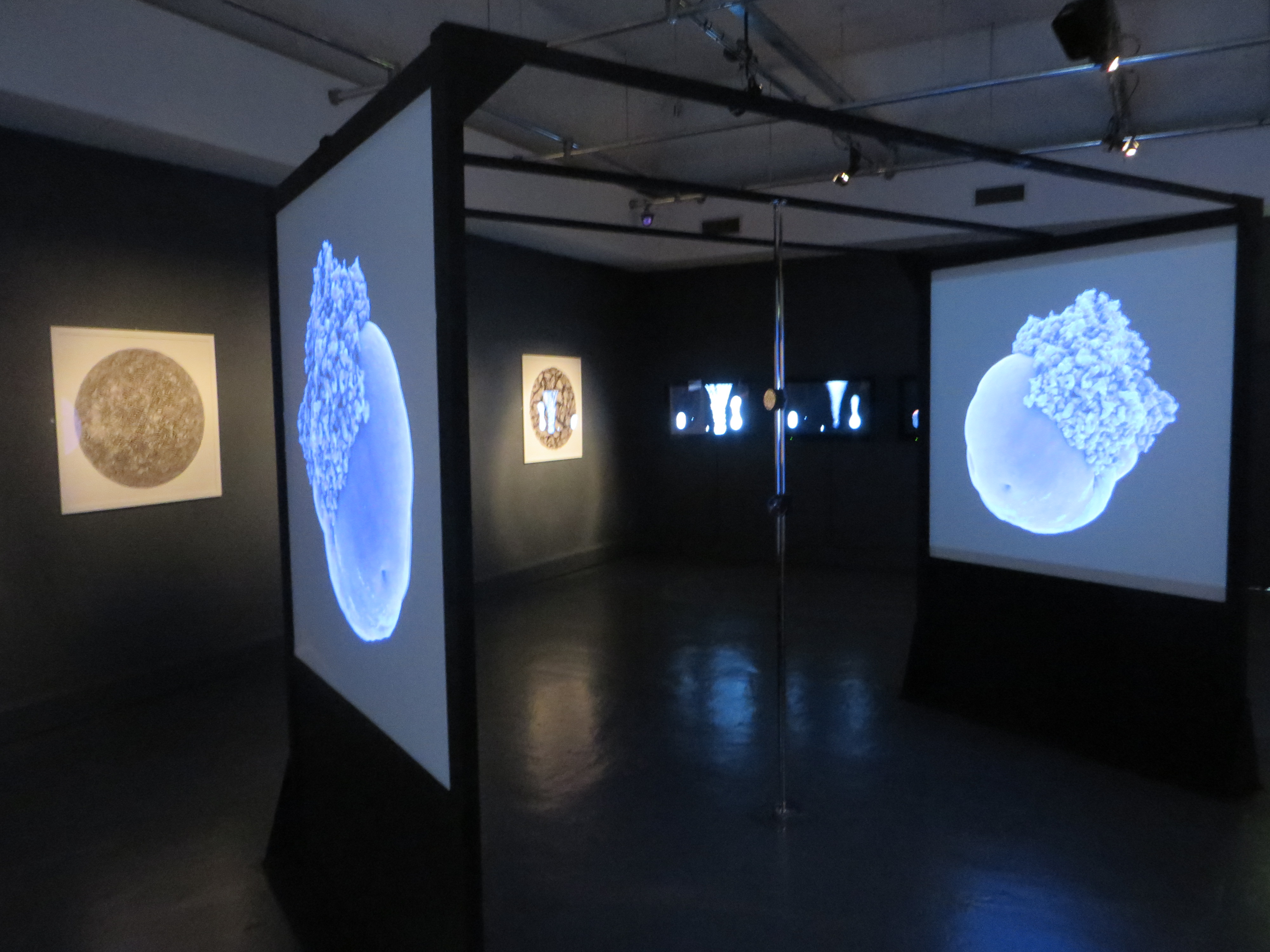
Morphogenetic Creations digital art exhibition by Andy Lomas at Watermans Arts Centre, west London, in 2016

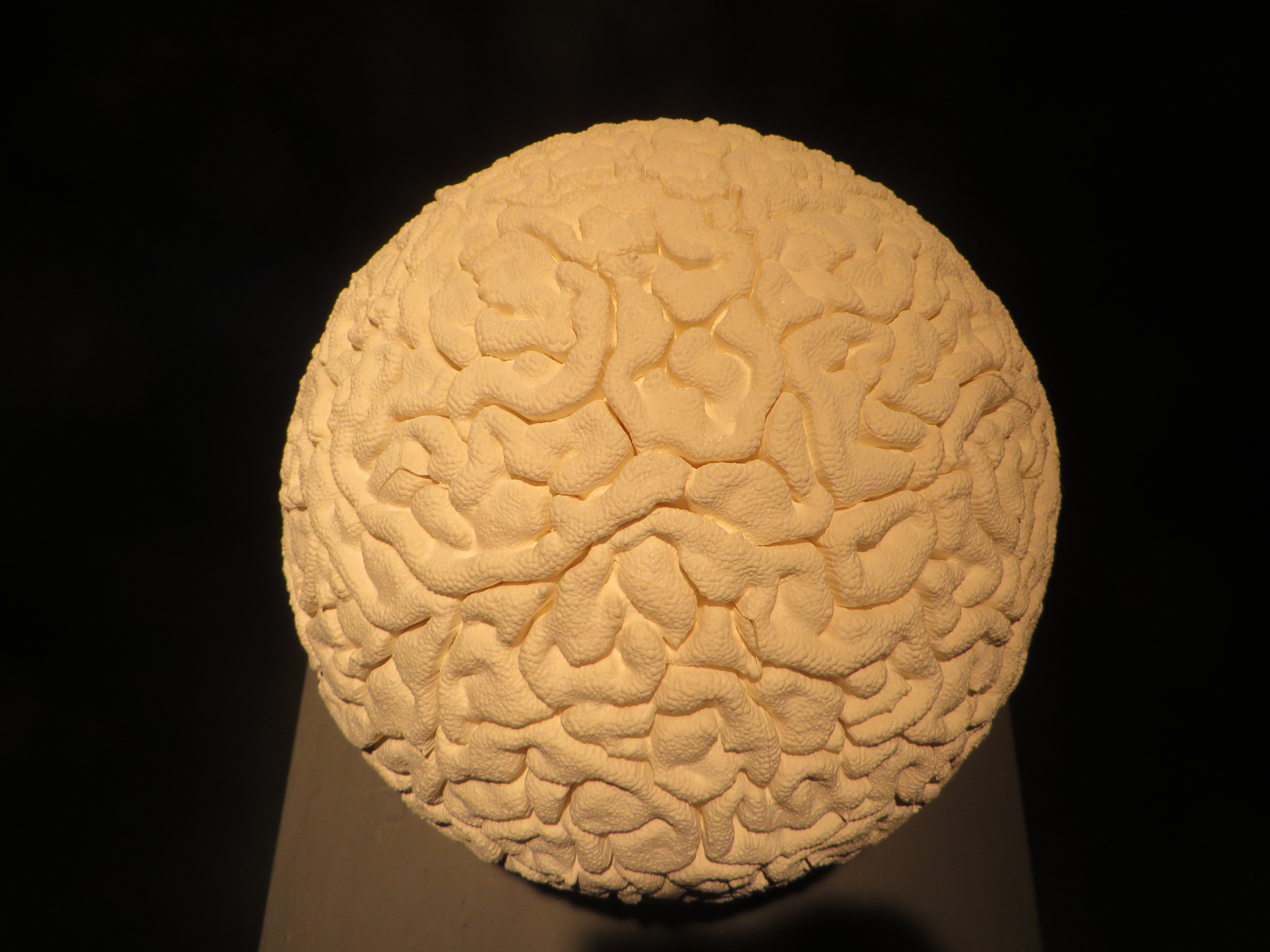
Morphogenetic sculpture by Andy Lomas at his Watermans Arts Centre exhibition in 2016

Andy Lomas (born 1967 in Welwyn Garden City, England) is a British artist with a mathematical background, formerly a television and film CG supervisor and more recently a contemporary digital artist, with a special interest in morphogenesis using mathematical morphology.

Lomas previously worked on visual effects using computer graphics (CGI) for television and films such as The Matrix Reloaded (2003), The Matrix Revolutions (2003) and Avatar (2009). before becoming a digital artist. In 2006 he appeared in The Tech of 'Over the Hedge', a short documentary. With his collaborators, in 1999 Lomas won the 51st Primetime Emmy Awards Outstanding Special Visual Effects for a Miniseries or a Movie for the 1999 film Alice in Wonderland.

Lomas's works are displayed in the form of videos, still images, and sculptures, produced using a mathematical programming approach. Some works include collaborative music, by Max Cooper for example. His artworks are inspired by the work of Ernst Haeckel, D'Arcy Thompson, and Alan Turing.

Lomas won the 2014 international Lumen Prize Gold Award for digital art, the top category. He has exhibited at the Butler Institute of American Art (Youngstown, Ohio, USA), the Computing Commons Art Gallery (Arizona State University), the Los Angeles Center for Digital Art, and SIGGRAPH.

In June–July 2016, Lomas held a solo exhibition of his work at the Watermans Arts Centre in west London, which has been acquired by the Victoria and Albert Museum for its collection. His work is also held in the D'Arcy Thompson Zoology Museum art collection at the University of Dundee in Scotland, funded by the UK Art Fund. In 2019, he contributed a chapter to the book Museums and Digital Culture.

By way of summarizing his technique, Lomas counts himself among those who have entered into a "hybrid" relationship with the computer, wherein the latter is used to quickly generate a series of visual images based on an original idea or algorithm.

Lomas was previously appointed as a Visiting Lecturer at University College London in the Bartlett School of Architecture and subsequently became a Lecturer in Creative Computing at Goldsmiths, University of London. His work is held in the Victoria and Albert Museum and Computer Arts Society collections.

In 2024, Lomas produced an animation generated using morphogenesis techniques as the official video for The Sun In A Box by the electronic musician Max Cooper.
