= Graham Diprose =

British photographer and author

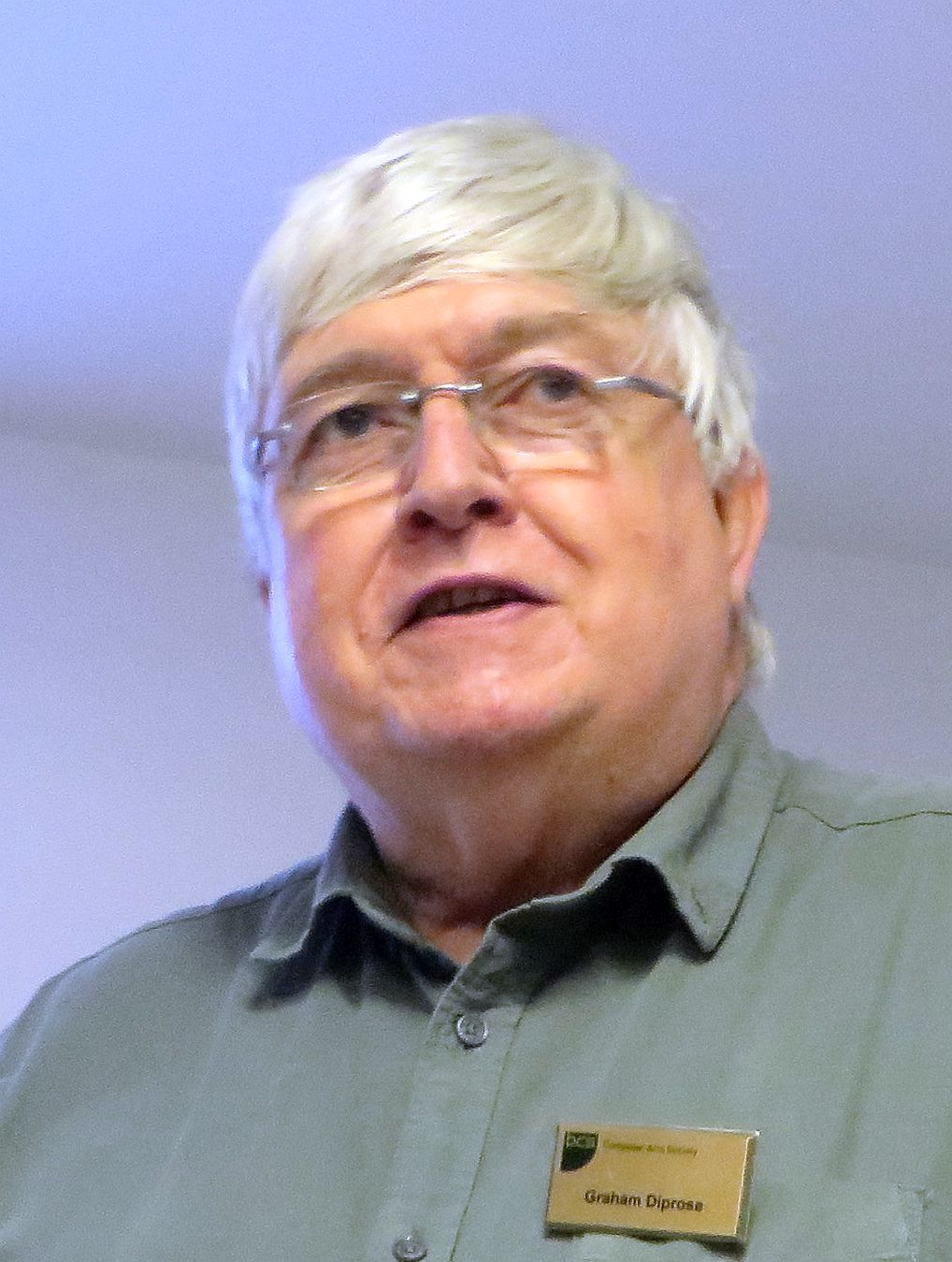
- Diprose speaking at the EVA London 2019 Conference
- Born: United Kingdom
- Occupations: Photographer; author; lecturer at the London College of Communication
- Known for: Landscape photography, especially the River Thames
- Notable work: The River Thames Revisited (2007); Photography: The New Basics (2012)

Grapham Diprose is a British photographer and author.

During the 1970s and 1980s, Diprose worked as a freelance advertising photographer in central London, while teaching studio photography part-time. In the 1980s and 1990s, he was a full-time lecturer at the London College of Communication, becoming Lead Tutor in Photography within the Faculty of Design. Later, he was Lead Tutor at the Speos Institute in London. He has an interest in both traditional photography and digital photography.

Diprose has been involved with research concerning the history of the River Thames, including following the photography of the early photographer Henry Taunt (1842–1922). He has also produced a photography textbook for Thames & Hudson, published in the United Kingdom, United States, and translated into Mandarin Chinese. In 2018, he aided the long-term preservation of photographs by Michael George for the University College, Oxford archive, with the college's archivist Robin Darwall-Smith.

Diprose has been on the Organising Committee for the EVA London Conference on Electronic Visualisation and the Arts since 2015, latterly as the main conference chair. He also liaises with the Art in Flux group of London-based digital artists.

== Selected books ==
- Diprose, Graham; Robins, Jeff (2007). The River Thames Revisited: In the Footsteps of Henry Taunt. Frances Lincoln Publishers. ISBN 978-0711227651.
- Diprose, Graham (2008). ...in the Footsteps of Henry Taunt: Text + Work. The Arts Institute at Bournemouth. ISBN 978-0901196286.
- Diprose, Graham; Craig, Charles; Seaborne, Mike (2009). London's Changing Riverscape: Panoramas from London Bridge to Greenwich. Frances Lincoln. ISBN 978-0711229419.
- Diprose, Graham; Robins, Jeff (2012). Photography: The New Basics – Principles, Techniques and Practice. Thames & Hudson. ISBN 978-0500289785.
- Weinel, Jon; Bowen, Jonathan P.; Diprose, Graham; Lambert, Nick, eds. (2019). EVA London 2019: Electronic Visualisation and the Arts. Electronic Workshops in Computing. BCS. doi:10.14236/ewic/EVA2019.0. ISBN 978-1-78017-522-5. S2CID 209809246.
