= Dominic Boreham =

British artist (born 1944)

- Born: December 29, 1944; Woodford, Essex, United Kingdom
- Died: December 4, 2022 (aged 77); France
- Occupation: Artist
- Known for: Algorithmic art

Dominic Boreham (1944-2022) was a British-born artist who created many plotter drawings from 1977 onwards. He was also the editor of the Computer Arts Society's PAGE magazine from 1979 to 1982.

== Biography ==
Dominic Boreham was born in Woodford, Essex in 1944. From 1979 to 1982 he was the editor of PAGE magazine, published by the Computer Arts Society. He moved to Burgundy, France in 1991. He died in December 2022, aged 77.

== Education ==
As a boy, Boreham attended the William Morris Technical School in London. After six years working as an assistant at the Fitzwilliam Museum, he took a foundation course at Cambridge School of Art. He then studied at Wimbledon College of Art from 1974 to 1977, going on to attend the Slade School of Art. Boreham completed a doctorate at the Royal College of Art in 1983.

== Artworks ==
From 1977 until 1983, Boreham solely made drawings using a computer to drive a flat-bed plotter. His plotter drawings were featured in the Computer Arts Society's PAGE magazine in July 1979.

== Public collections ==
His work is held by the Victoria and Albert Museum, the Sainsbury Centre for Visual Arts, the Musée d’Art et d’Histoire, Cholet, the National & University Library, Zagreb, and other public collections.

== Exhibitions ==
Boreham's artworks have featured in many exhibitions, including

- 2014 Automatic Art, GV Art London, 3 July- 10 September 2014.
- 2018-2020 Chance and Control: Art in the Age of Computers, organised by the Victoria and Albert Museum and touring to Chester Visual Arts and Firstsite, Colchester.
