= Gretchen Andrew =

American artist (born 1988)

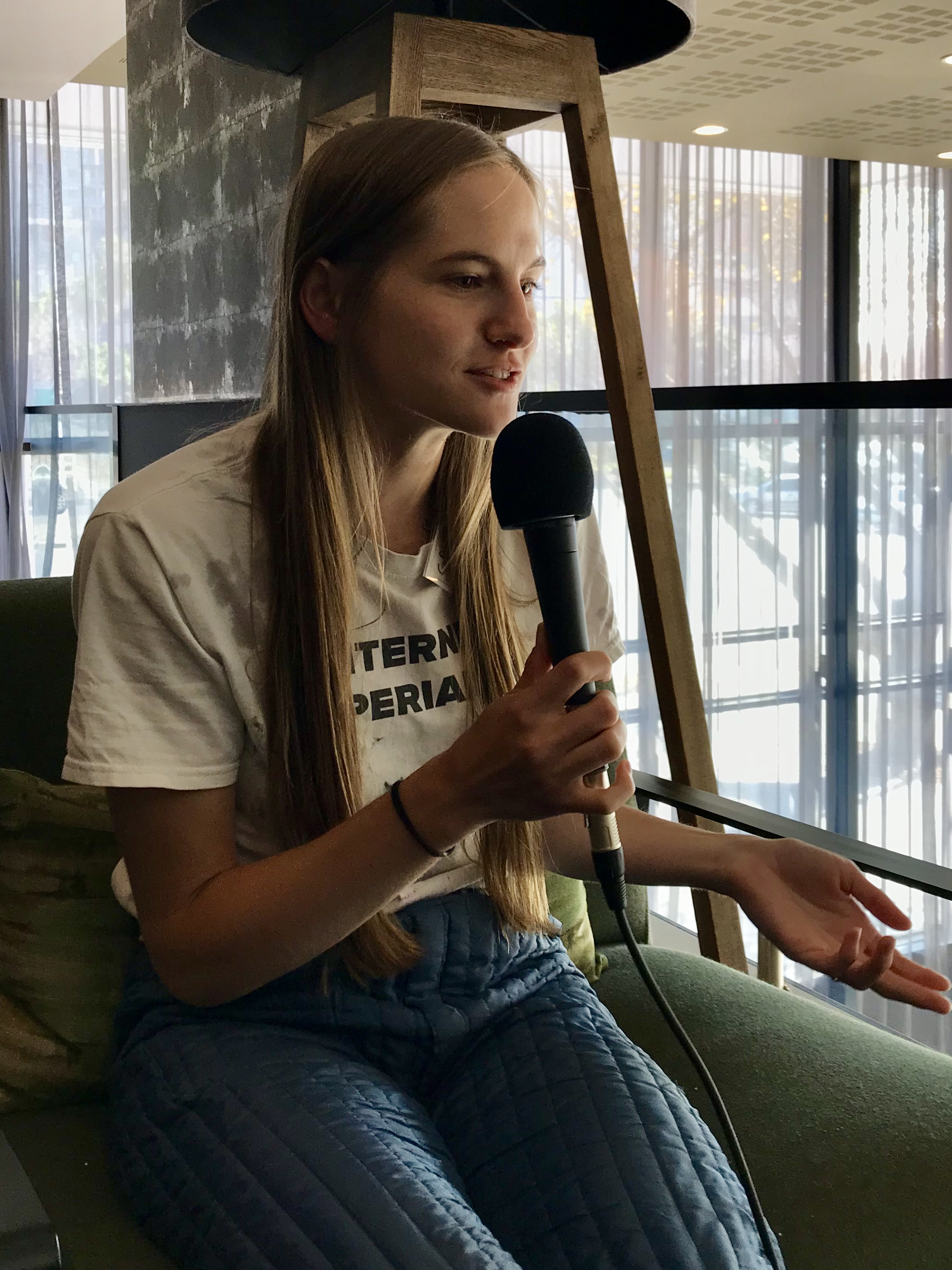
- Born: 1988 (age 37–38)
- Occupation: Artist
- Movement: Painting, Internet Art, Post-internet
- Website: www.gretchenandrew.com

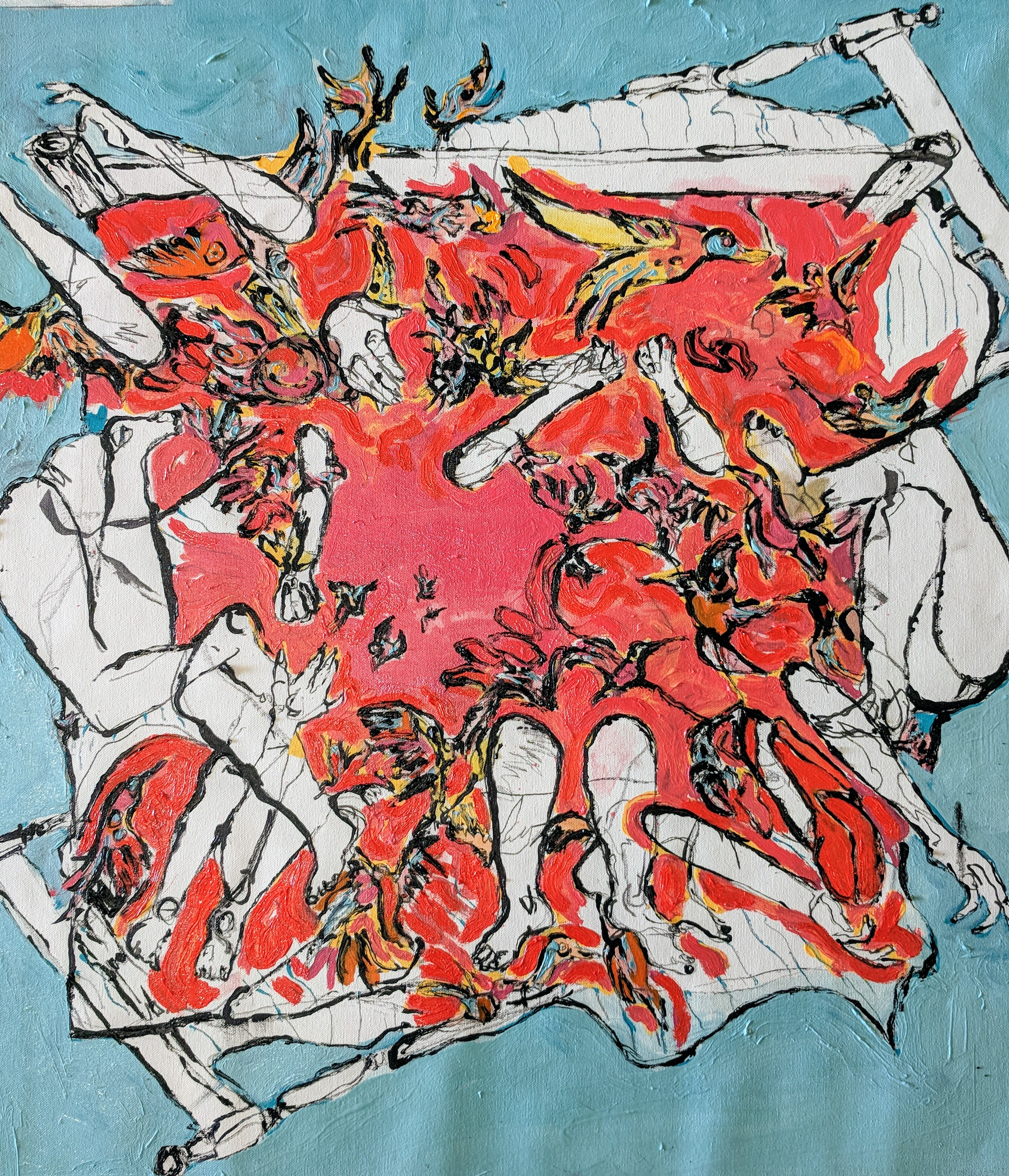
L'Appel du Vide, 2018.

Gretchen Andrew (born 1988) is an American artist. She is known for fusing different mediums (such as photography and painting) with advanced technology. Her painting practice is mostly described as an exploration of portraiture, search engine art and virtual reality. Her work is known for making the invisible impacts of technology visible.

Her work is exhibited in museums and galleries in Europe and the United States, including The Monterey Museum of Art, Hope 93, De Re Gallery, Arebyte gallery.

In her series Facetune Portraits, she uses oil paintings to confront the rise of AI-generated beauty standards and their impact on self-perception in the digital age. This series won the 21C Acquisition Award at the Untitled Miami in 2024.

== Biography ==
Gretchen Andrew grew up in New Hampshire. She studied Information Systems at Boston College where she attended on a track scholarship. Describing her degree she has said, "Information systems is all about how companies use technology for competitive advantage...translated into art, I'm asking how I can use information to create meaning."

Andrew worked in Silicon Valley at both Intuit and Google. After working there from 2010 to 2012, she left Google to become a painter. She has claimed to have developed her artistic technique by watching how to videos on YouTube. The idea that one can learn about all topics on the Internet was the motto of her artistic series "How to How to How to".

From 2012 to 2017 she apprenticed with London-based figurative painter Billy Childish who is still her mentor.

In 2020 she moved to Park City, Utah.

== Work ==
=== Search Engine Art (2018 - 2023) ===
From 2018 - 2023 Gretchen Andrew's paintings explored and manipulated the functioning of ad technology such as search engines, particularly Google Search.

Her first search engine art piece occurred accidentally when she would copy Billy Childish's paintings and title them as "After Billy Childish". Since internet technology was unable to grasp the nuance between original and facsimile, her versions popped up first when she searched for his paintings online.

In 2018 Gretchen's work then focused on the political and social impact of search technology, exploring in a paper with The British Computer Society the implications for artificial intelligence.

In 2018 she coined the term "search engine art" in a book she co-authored with Irini Papadimitriou through V&A Digital Futures.

In February 2019 Gretchen Andrew used her Internet Imperialism process to convince Google Image Search that images of her artwork are the most important visual content related to Frieze Los Angeles, the much-hyped international art fair. The digital performance brought her prominence with The Los Angeles Times, Hyperallergic, artnet, and others reporting on Gretchen and her practice.

She has manipulated the search results using search engine optimization techniques for the terms "powerful person", "made for women", and "frieze Los Angeles", among others. Her paintings and search engine art are said to relate to the art world in an aspirational way.

In 2023, she was part of the curatorial team of the Santa Monica Art Museum founded by art collector and businessman Christoph Rahofer and her work was included in the exhibition Looking West.

=== Facetune Portraits (2024 - present) ===
Introduced in September 2024 at Berlin Art Week, Facetune Portraits is a limited series of unique oil paintings made using AI, algorithms and robotics to address questions about who humans are in relationship to who technology tells them they should be. Martin Robinson of The Standard called the result, "chilling and poignant work."

Gretchen Andrew's Facetune Portraits Universal Beauty series is described as a searing critique of the global standardization of beauty where the artist both utilizes and interrogates technology, serving as a meditation on the medium itself. The works are created by taking images of contestants from Miss Universe and applying popular apps such as Facetune and Body Tune to “enhance” the image using AI. The artist then uses an oil paint printer developed by Matr Labs to produce the unmodified image in oil paint. While still wet the painting is put through an XY-axis drawing robot that is instructed by the discrepancies between the original image and an AI-modified (facetuned) version. The robot adds brushstrokes where lines have changed thus visually highlighting the AI’s alterations. The artist has cited Frank Auerbach and Alberto Giacometti, who depict multiple perspectives, as inspiration for the visual, painterly nature of the resulting work.
