= EVA Conferences =

The Electronic Visualisation and the Arts conferences (EVA Conferences for short, aka Electronic Information, the Visual Arts and Beyond) are a series of international interdisciplinary conferences mainly in Europe, but also elsewhere in the world, for people interested in the application of information technology to the cultural and especially the visual arts field, including art galleries and museums.

== Overview ==
Started in London (United Kingdom), there have also been EVA conferences in Berlin (Germany), Florence (Italy), Jerusalem (Israel), Paris (France), St Petersburg (formerly in Moscow, Russia), Australasia (first time in Canberra, Australia, in 2016) and other major cities. The first EVA Conference was held at Imperial College, London in 1990, organised by the founders James Hemsley, Kirk Martinez, and Anthony Hamber.

The conferences were initially overseen by EVA Conferences International, based in London. Conference proceedings are published (e.g., for EVA London and EVA Florence). In addition, two collected volumes of revised papers are available.

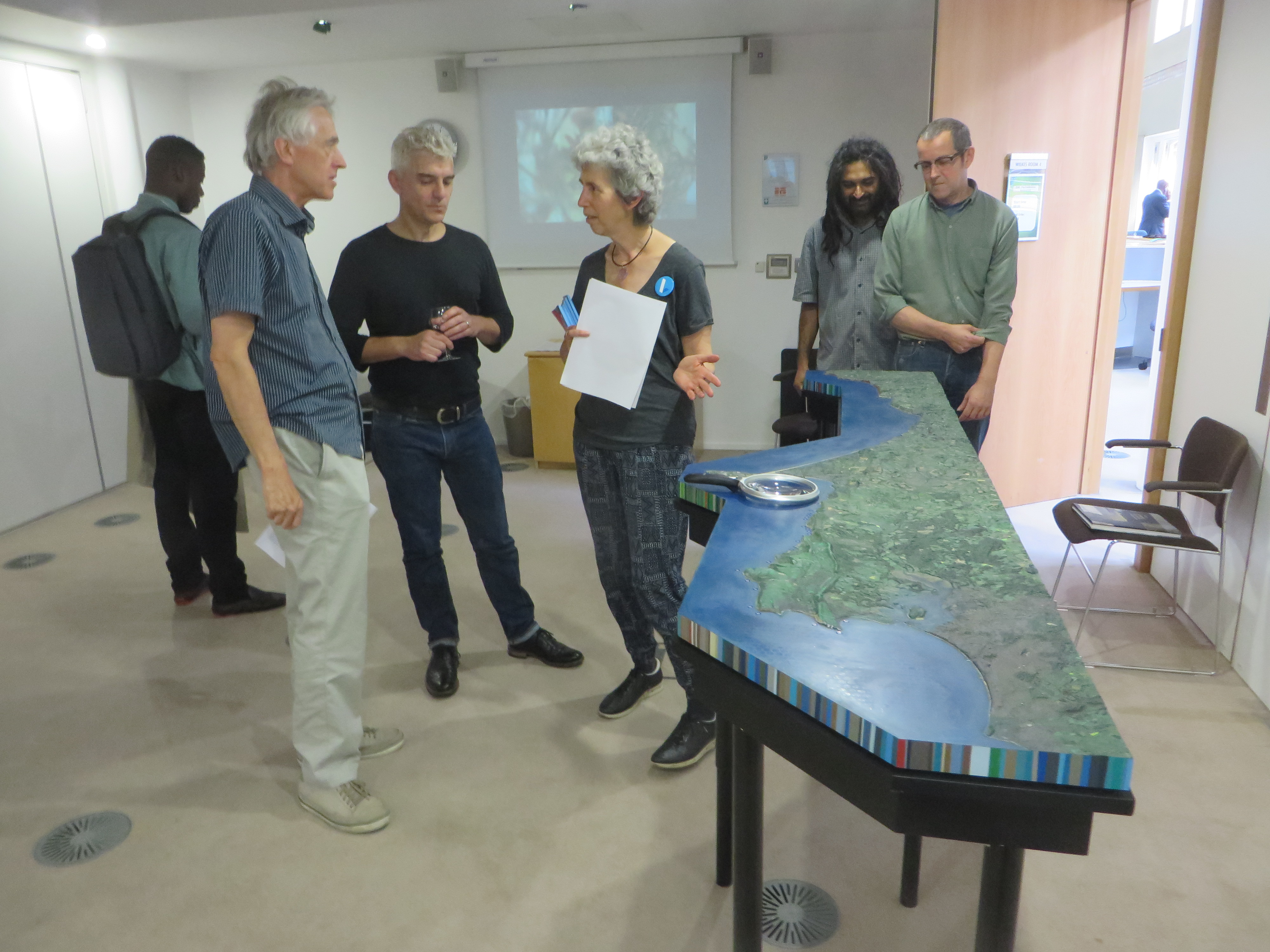
The artist Jeremy Gardiner with his exhibit of the Jurassic Coast at the V&A Digital Futures event organised as part of the EVA London 2016 conference, held at the BCS offices in London, England on 11 July 2016

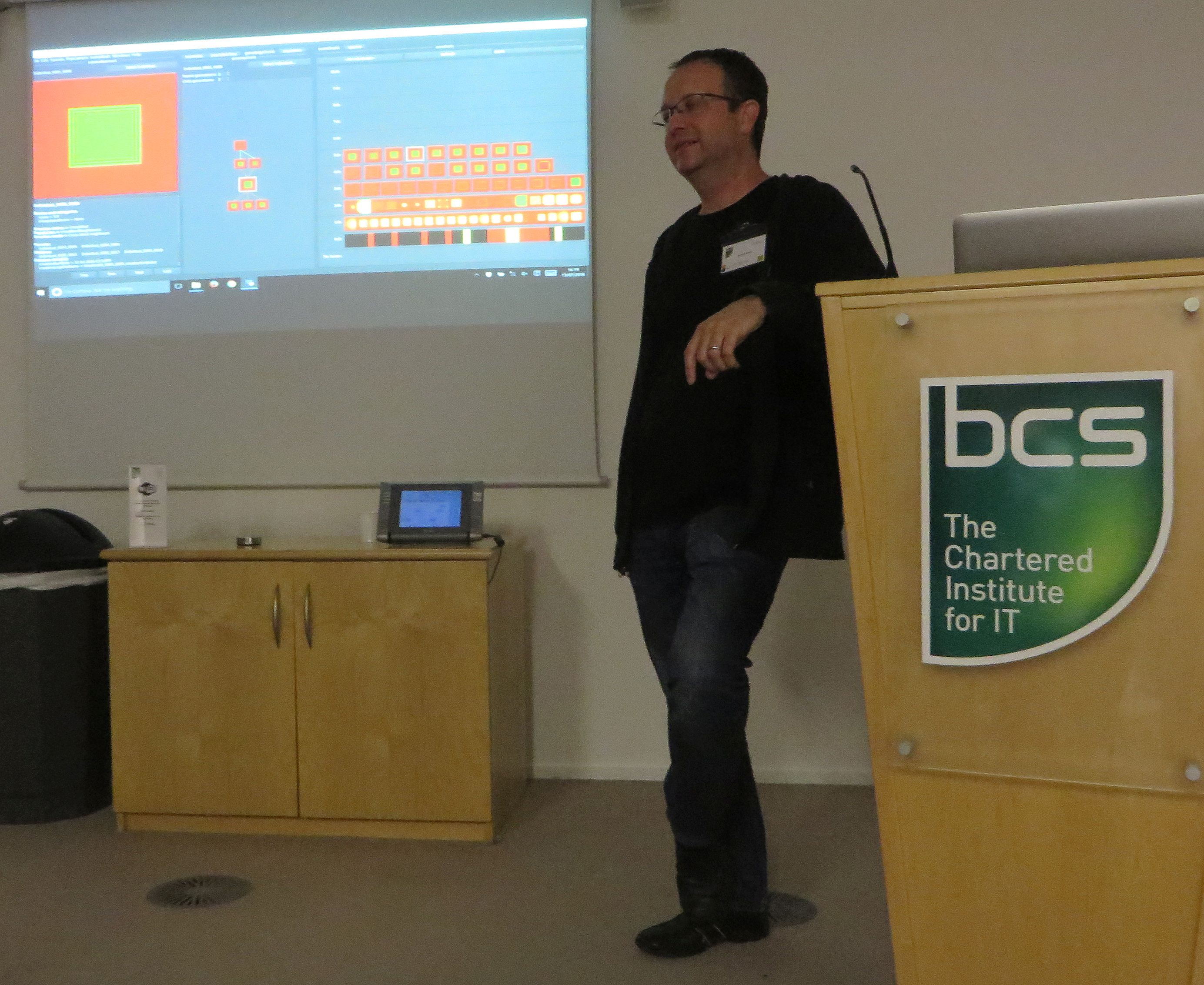
The digital artist Andy Lomas presenting at the EVA London 2016 conference at the BCS in central London

Kim H. Veltman delivering his keynote talk at the EVA London 2017 conference, 11 July 2017

== EVA London ==
The EVA London conference, founded in 1990 by James Hemsley, is now organised through the Computer Arts Society (CAS), a Specialist Group of the BCS, each July at the BCS London office.

Some V&A Digital Futures events organised by the Victoria and Albert Museum have been held in conjunction with EVA London. In 2016, it hosted an event for the Lumen Prize, an annual award for digital art. The proceedings have published through the BCS Electronic Workshops in Computing (eWiC) series since 2008, and are indexed by DBLP.

In 2019, EVA London helped to co-organise the Event Two digital art exhibition at the Royal College of Art (RCA), held immediately after the conference, celebrating the 50th anniversary of the Event One exhibition, also held at the RCA. The main chairs are Jonathan Bowen, Graham Diprose, Nick Lambert, Jon Weinel, and Ian Willcock.

From 2020, videos of presentations and links to papers in the proceedings have been archived by the Computer Arts Society in the Computer Arts Archive. CAS maintains a separate EVA London Archive of proceedings, papers, and recorded talks at EVA conferences.

== Key people ==
=== James Hemsley ===
James R. Hemsley
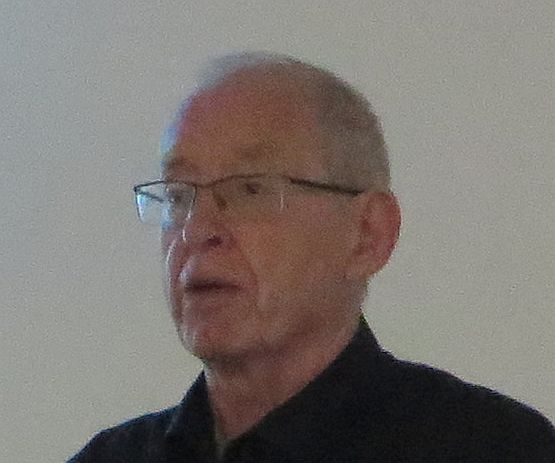
- James Hemsley speaking at the EVA London 2016 Conference.
- Born: 1941 (age 84–85)
- Other name: Jim Hemsley
- Education: University of Oxford; Imperial College, London; Birkbeck College
- Occupation: Consultant
- Known for: Digital heritage EVA Conferences; ESPRIT VASARI Project; VASARI UK

Dr James R. Hemsley is a consultant in the field of digital heritage. In particular, he is the founder of the EVA Conferences on Electronic Imaging & the Visual Arts, started in 1990 and continuing to this day.

==== Education and career ====
Hemsley was educated as a mathematician at the University of Oxford and undertook his PhD at Imperial College, London in England. Later, he also studied at Birkbeck College. During his career, he has dedicated himself to electronically mediated culture and heritage. The first EVA Conference was held at Imperial College, London in 1990, and many EVA Conferences have been held around the world, including continuing conferences in London on an annual basis. John Sunderland has written in a journal special issue dedicated to EVA:

EVA was the brainchild of James Hemsley. ... It is due wholly to his enthusiasm and literally tireless energy that EVA has achieved the success and renown that it has.

Hemsley founded VASARI UK Limited in 1993 as a result of the European ESPRIT II VASARI Project, which he project-managed, aimed at digitizing paintings at very high quality. He was also project director of the EC-supported EVA Networking EVAN projects. Among his posts, he has worked for the National Museums of Scotland.

Hemsley lives in central London. He has provided archival material on the EVA conferences to the Computer Arts Society EVA London Archive, especially early proceedings and related documents.

==== VASARI Project ====
Hemsley took a leading role in the ESPRIT II VASARI Project, including the National Gallery, London as a partner, during 1989–1992. The aim of the project was to develop a colorimetric scanner system for high-resolution digital imaging of paintings. Hemsley subsequently founded VASARI UK Limited in 1993. He was also involved with the establishment of the VASARI Research Centre for Art and Technology at Birkbeck, University of London, where he later became an emeritus member. VASARI was featured in the Financial Times and on the BBC programme Tomorrow's World.

==== Selected books ====
- Hemsley, James, ed. (2002). EVA 2001 Scotland Glasgow. EVA Conferences International. ISBN 978-0954314606.
- Hemsley, James; Cappellini, Vito; Stanke, Gerd, eds. (2005). Digital Applications for Cultural and Heritage Institutions. Routledge. ISBN 978-0-7546-3359-4.

=== Others ===
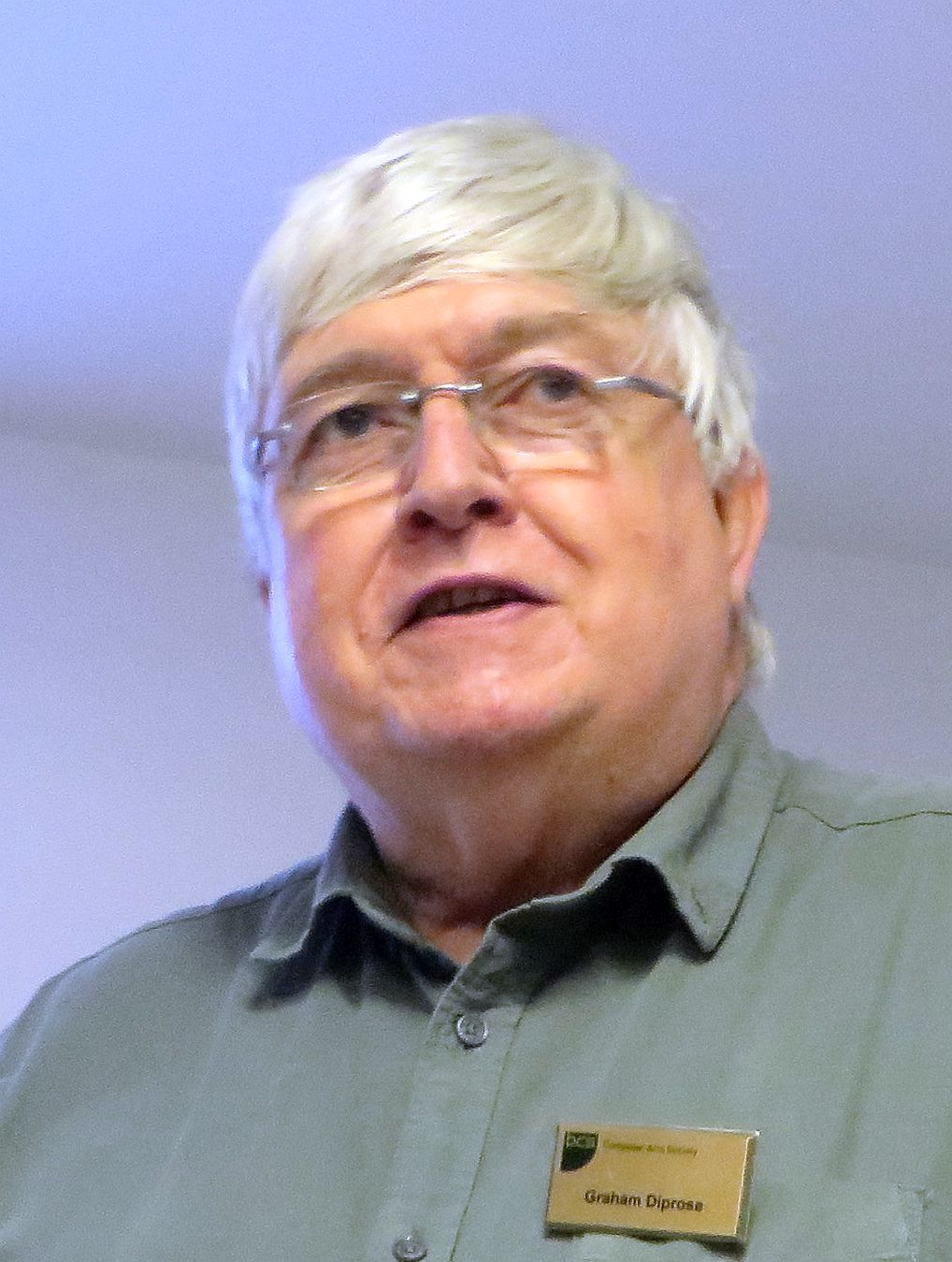
Graham Diprose speaking at the EVA London 2029 Conference

Other key organizers of the EVA London Conference include:

- Jonathan Bowen
- Sean Clark
- Graham Diprose
- Nick Lambert
- Jon Weinel
- Ian Willcock

== See also ==
- Computer Arts Society
- ICHIM
- Lumen Prize
- Museums and the Web
- V&A Digital Futures
