= V&A Digital Futures =

Series of digital arts events by the V&A

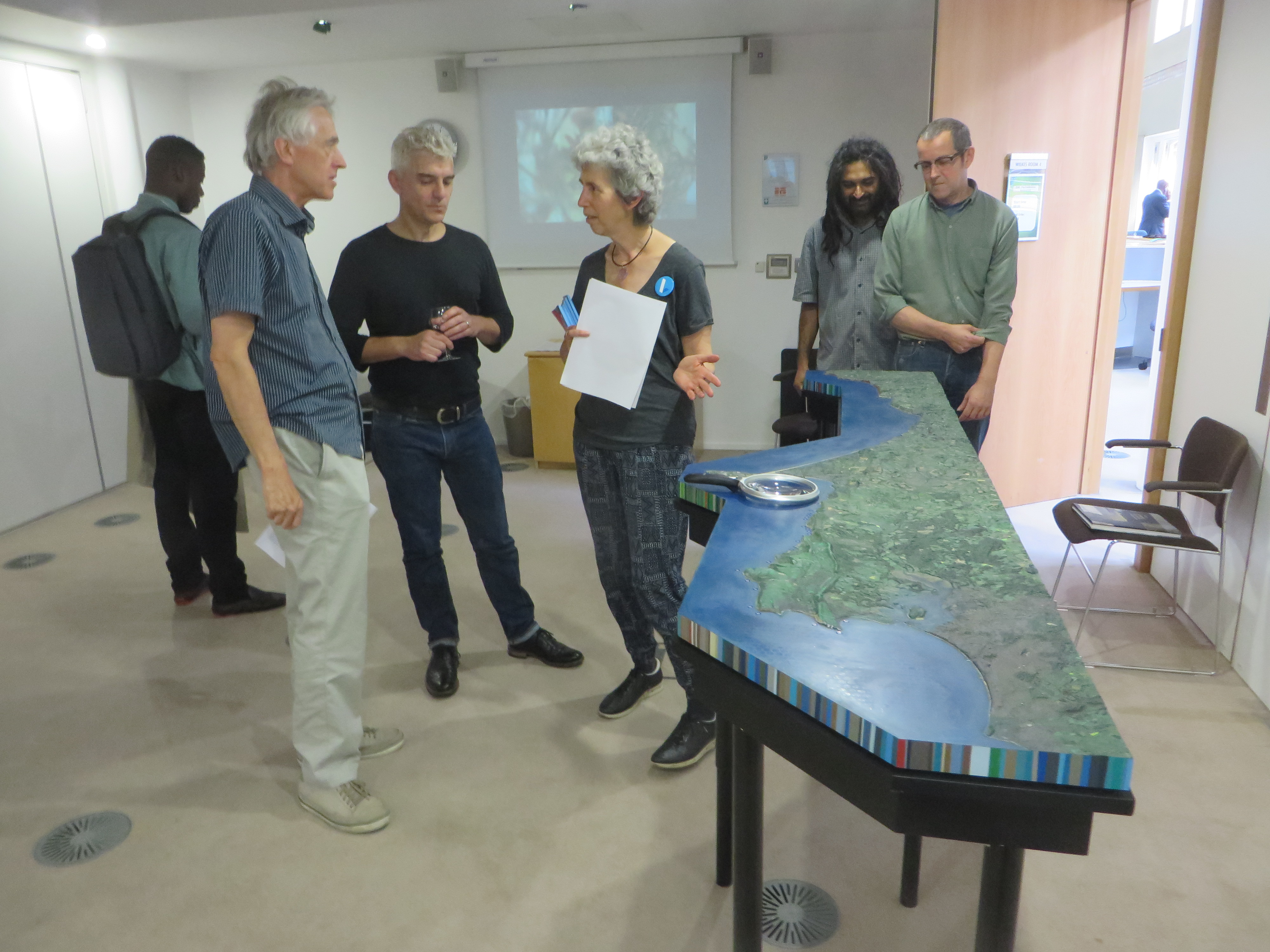
The artist Jeremy Gardiner with his exhibit of the Jurassic Coast at the V&A Digital Futures event organized as part of the EVA London 2016 conference, held at the BCS offices in London, England on 11 July 2016.

V&A Digital Futures is a series of events organized by the Victoria and Albert Museum (V&A) in the area of digital art.

Digital Futures events are organized by Irini Papadimitriou of the V&A, who started the events in 2012, some at the V&A museum itself and some elsewhere around London especially but also elsewhere in the United Kingdom. Some Digital Futures events have been held in conjunction with the annual EVA London conference. There are some associated publications.

The V&A museum has a significant collection of computer art.

== See also ==
- EVA London
- Lumen Prize
