= VIPS (software) =

Open source image processing software package

- Stable release: 8.18.6 / 25 August 2026; 31 days ago
- Written in: C, GTK+
- Operating system: Microsoft Windows, macOS, Linux
- Type: image processing
- License: GNU Lesser General Public License; GNU General Public License
- Website: libvips.github.io/libvips/
- Repository: github.com/libvips/libvips

VIPS is an open source image processing software package. It is particularly good with large images, works with multi-core processors, working with colour, scientific analysis and general research & development. It was developed during and is the product of several European research projects (VASARI, MARC, ACOHIR, Viseum) which were primarily about Imaging art, but which demanded a new approach to image processing.

Compared to most image processing libraries VIPS needs little RAM and runs quickly, especially on machines with more than one CPU. This is primarily due to its architecture which automatically parallelises the image workflows.

The software has two main parts: libvips is the image-processing library and nip4 is the graphical user-interface. The GUI aims to be about half-way between Photoshop and Excel. It is not designed for tasks such as retouching photographs, but more useful for the many other imaging tasks that programs like Photoshop are used for. Both work on Linux, Unix, Windows and Apple macOS (10.2 and later).

VIPS is a standard package for many Linux distributions, including Debian, Fedora, Mint, and Ubuntu.

== Software Design ==
Most of libVIPS is written in C, with bindings available for Python, Ruby and several other languages.

VIPS processes images in small portions (rectangles or groups of lines) and groups of operations are automatically run by separate threads. This makes the processing parallel because modern systems run the threads on different cores. It also means that image intermediates are small and can easily be stored in RAM. This is how multi-GB sized images can be processed on machines efficiently. It also uses the smallest storage type for values, so a typical RGB image would use three one byte values but after arithmetic operations these scale up to avoid errors to 16 and 32 bit values. The demand-driven design means that if only a certain part of input images are required to compute what is needed, only the required parts are calculated. There are many architectural elements which give VIPS its speed including its lack of locks and ability to overlap input and output. Most images start as three bytes per pixel (RGB) but when processing VIPS will upsize the elements to 16, 32 or 64 bits each if necessary to avoid clipping/rounding errors. This also contributes to the speed and low RAM use. Its demand-driven design means that, for example, a very large intermediate image may not be fully calculated if the output target requires just a small part of it.

== History ==
VASARI was an EU-funded research project to build a system capable of measuring long-term colour change in old master paintings. Previous systems had made a series of point measurements of areas thought likely to degrade - of course this meant that changes in parts of the painting that hadn't been measured would be missed. VASARI aimed to fix this through imaging: it would use a camera to measure colour and simply record the whole painting.

The project had partners in Germany, France, Italy and Britain. Kirk Martinez of Birkbeck College and David Saunders of the National Gallery London were responsible for building the London scanner. Kirk hired Nicos Dessipris, who had been a fellow research student in the Image Processing group of the University of Essex, and David hired John Cupitt, who had just finished a PhD in Theoretical Computer Science at the University of Kent.

The project wanted to image paintings up to about 1m by 1m, with a resolution of up to about 20 pixels per millimetre, since the smallest interesting features in a painting are about 0.1mm. Multiple colour bands were needed (7 was decided upon), since the aim was to measure reflectance spectra rather than just colour. The final requirement was for 16 bit data. Put these requirements together and you reach an image size of about 1GB per colour channel. A suitable image processing library which could handle the data size needed could not be found, so custom one was developed. Machines of the time were very modest by today's standards: a Sun workstation cost £40,000, had 64MB of RAM and ran at 25 MHz, so this was quite a challenge.

Kirk had developed simple but fast C libraries during his PhD which worked on memory-mapped "framestores" for video processing. Kirk and Nikos looked at HIPS for inspiration but found pipes too inefficient. So VIPS was based on their experience with that as well as early Unix image processing software they developed. Early VIPS code used memory-mapped files for input (back then an exciting novelty which was faster than file I/O) and wrote data a scanline at a time. At the National Gallery, John Cupitt wrote a GUI called "vf" in SunView, Sun's graphical environment. The first version just displayed an image on the workstation screen and let you pan and zoom. The next version added a simple expression language and let you type in things like "a + 12" to brighten an image. It was renamed "ip", for image processing. It was through these early experiments that the basics of libVIPS were created.

VASARI ended in 1993 but a follow-on European project called MARC allowed for more development. This aimed to use the imaging techniques developed in VASARI to build a colorimetric camera and to use it to print an art catalogue. Nicos left and John took over the development of the VIPS library, the GUI and the camera software. Sun had just produced their first two-CPU workstation, so VIPS gained SMP support. A further aim was to reduce the time spent on disc IO, so at the same time the ability to "chain" operators together without the need for intermediate storage was added. ip was rewritten to use the Motif user-interface toolkit and gained fully editable history.

In 1997 Kirk Martinez moved to the University of Southampton so development and use continued in more projects (including Viseum, ACOHIR and Artiste) and VIPS and ip developed in response to their needs. The software was moved from Sun to Linux in the late 90s and ip moved from Motif to GTK+, becoming nip. VIPS gained support for files larger than 2GB, and for up to 64 CPUs. nip was rewritten again for GTK+-2.0 and became the nip2 we know today.

In 2005, John Cupitt moved from the National Gallery to Imperial College to work on medical imaging. VIPS and nip2 gained many features while he worked there. Recent additions have been support for Analyze, DICOM3, FITS, Matlab and Radiance images, run-time code generation, and the start of a move to a GObject foundation.

== Users ==
libVIPS is currently used in MediaWiki and hence by Wikipedia itself in the VipsScaler extension. This speeds up and extends image handling compared to previously used software and hence saves processor time on the busy systems. For similar reasons it is used by Booking.com, Amazon, the New York Times, fda.gov, Homefinder and Idealista among over a thousand companies. The popular Sharp Node.js module and Gatsby use libVIPS so web sites using them rely on libVIPS. Amazon Web Services recommend Sharp/VIPS in their guidelines Many image archives use IIPimage to allow browsing of very high resolution images online - and these are normally prepared using libVIPS.

== License ==
libvips is licensed under the LGPL and nip2 is licensed under the GPL.
