= John Lansdown =

British computer graphics pioneer

- Born: 2 January 1929
- Died: 17 February 1999 (aged 70)

Academic work
- Institutions: Middlesex University; System Simulation
- Main interests: computer graphics
- Notable works: Teach Yourself Computer Graphics

Robert John Lansdown (2 January 1929 – 17 February 1999) was a British computer graphics pioneer, polymath and Professor Emeritus at Middlesex University's Lansdown Centre for Electronic Arts, which was renamed in his honour in 2000.

== Career ==
Lansdown became a successful architect in Russell Square in the early 1960s, forming a passion about computers and their potential in architecture. During that time, he advanced the use of computers as an aid to planning, for example making perspective drawings on an Elliott 803 computer in 1963 (modelling a building's lifts and services, plotting the annual fall of daylight across its site, etc.) with his own computer-aided design applications.

He joined the ACM in 1972 and Eurographics in 1983. From the early 1970s to the 1990s, he had influential roles in several professional bodies, and chaired the Science Research Council's Computer Aided Building Design Panel, through which he implemented a leading strategy for developing computer-aided architectural design in British universities. He was influential as one of the founders of the Computer Arts Society in 1968, along with Alan Sutcliffe and George Mallen, and then as secretary of the Society (1968–1991). He chaired and organized many international conferences – Event One at the Royal College of Art (1969) and Interact at the Edinburgh Festival (1973) were seminal events in establishing the use of computers for the creation of art works.

In 1977, he became chairman of System Simulation (that created the Computer Arts Society in London), and explored computer graphics techniques in TV and film, following collaborative research work at the Royal College of Art. At System Simulation, Lansdown played a role in advertising techniques, and important animation projects, such as contributing to flight deck instrumentation readouts for the "Nostromo" space ship in Ridley Scott's Alien. He later worked alongside Tony Pritchett, producing the 3D wireframe drawings from which Martin Lambie-Nairn's original Channel 4 logo was rendered.

Lansdown left the architectural practice in 1982, and split his time between System Simulation and a Senior Research Fellowship at the Royal College of Art, before becoming a full-time academic in 1988 as professor and head of the Centre for Computer Aided Art & Design at Middlesex University (then, as Dean of the Department of Art, Design and Performing Arts, and eventually as Pro Vice-Chancellor of the University). He was also Senior Visiting Fellow at the Department of Architectural Science, University of Sydney in Australia, from 1983. He relinquished these roles on formal retirement in 1995, but continued to be very active and influential as Emeritus Professor in the Centre for Electronic Arts.

== Publications ==
Lansdown's range of publications began to diversify from the early 1970s. He wrote the classic Teach Yourself Computer Graphics (Hodder and Stoughton, 1987), exhibited algorithmically generated images, animations, compositions, conversations, sword fights and choreography, such as the 18-minute dance piece A/C/S/H/O commissioned by the One Extra Dance Company and performed at the Sydney Opera House in 1990. He contributed as author and/or editor to 34 books and worked on more than a hundred conference and journal publications.

== Bibliography ==
- Catherine Mason, A Computer in the Art Room: The origins of British computer art 1950–1980. JJG Publishing, 2008. ISBN 978-1-899163-89-2.
- Paul Brown, Charlie Gere, Nicholas Lambert, and Catherine Mason (editors), White Heat Cold Logic: British Computer Art 1960–1980. The MIT Press, Leonardo Book Series, 2008. ISBN 978-0-262-02653-6.
- Charlie Gere, 'Minicomputer Experimentalism in the United Kingdom from the 1950s to 1980' in Hannah Higgins and Douglas Kahn (editors), Mainframe experimentalism: Early digital computing in the experimental arts. Berkeley, CA: University of California Press, 2012, pp. 114–116.
