= Jonas Lund =

Swedish conceptual artist (born 1984)

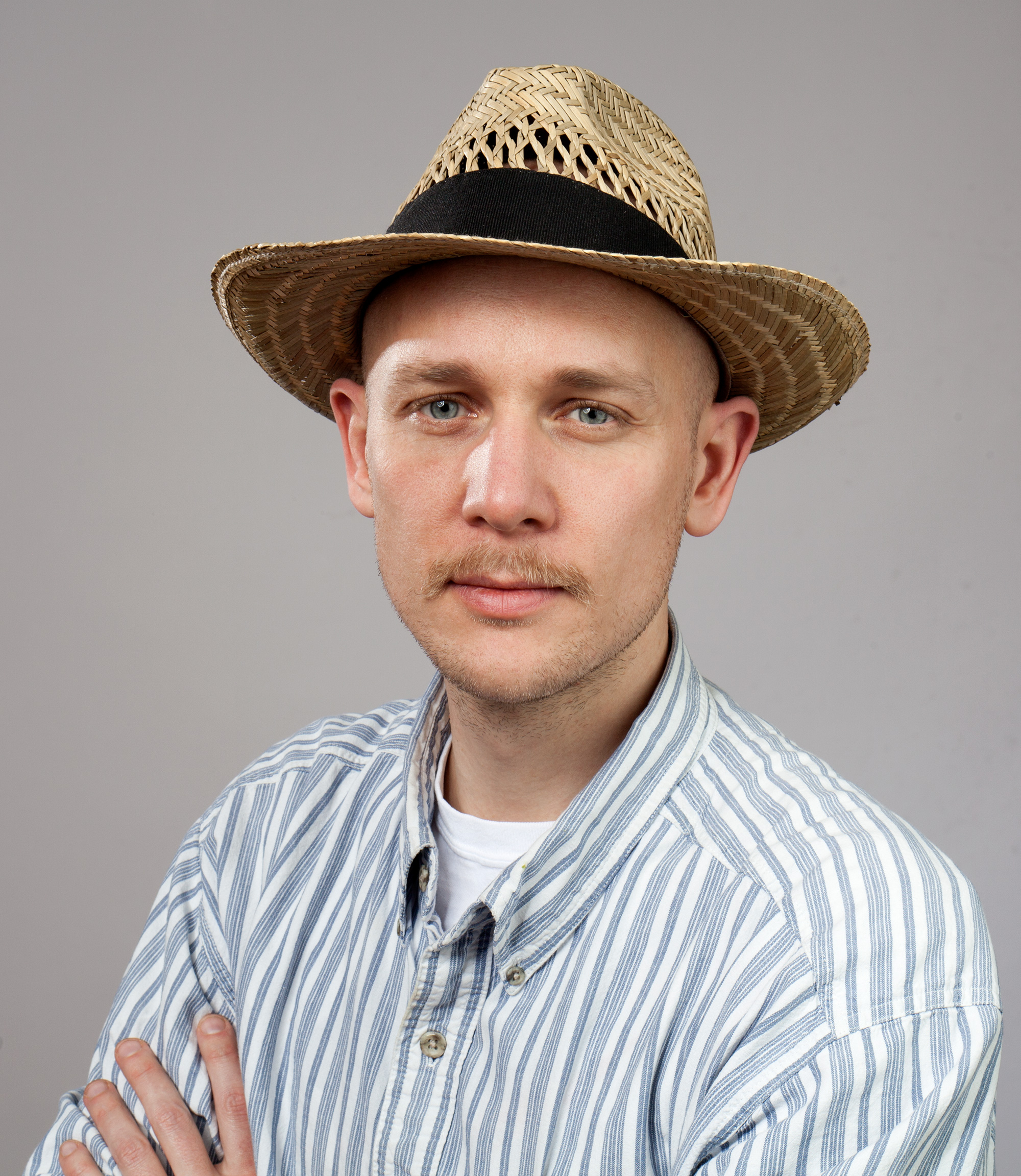
- Jonas Lund, 2019
- Born: 1984 (age 41–42); Linköping, Sweden
- Education: Gerrit Rietveld Academy, Amsterdam; Piet Zwart Institute, Rotterdam
- Known for: Conceptual art, ultra-contemporary art, installation, video, performance
- Notable work: The Fear of Missing Out, Flip City, Studio Practice, VIP (Viewer Improved Painting), Jonas Lund Token, Operation Earnest Voice: Brexit Division, Talk to Me, MVP (Most Valuable Painting), The Future of Something
- Movement: Conceptual art, post-internet art, ultra-contemporary art, internet art
- Awards: Prix Arts Numériques (Fondation Etrillard / Académie des Beaux-Arts, 2025); Lumen Prize shortlist (2023) net_based award shortlist (HEK, 2017)
- Website: jonaslund.com

Jonas Lund (born 1984) is a Swedish conceptual artist who creates paintings, sculpture, photography, websites, video works and performances that critically reflect on contemporary networked systems, power structures, and the mechanisms of the art world. His practice is characterized by the use of algorithms, artificial intelligence, and participatory frameworks that interrogate value production, authorship, and decision-making in both digital ecosystems and traditional art institutions.

== Biography ==
Lund was born in 1984 in Linköping, Sweden. He earned a BFA at the Gerrit Rietveld Academy, Amsterdam (2009) and an MA at Piet Zwart Institute, Rotterdam (2013). Lund was an Eyebeam resident in 2012. In 2016, he was an artist in residence at Capacete in Rio de Janeiro, Brazil. He has received commissions from the Mozilla Foundation (2021), the Goethe-Institut Minneapolis (2019), and the LIMA Collection in Amsterdam (2016). In 2017, his work "Fair Warning" was shortlisted for the net_based award, and in 2023, "The Future of Nothing" was shortlisted for the Lumen Prize Moving Image Award. In 2025, his work "MVP (Most Valuable Painting)" was awarded the inaugural Prix Arts numériques (Digital Arts Prize) by the Fondation Etrillard and the Académie des beaux-arts, marking the first time digital art was recognized by the French Academy of Fine Arts. Lund's work has been acquired by major institutions including the Centre Pompidou in Paris (2023) and the Stedelijk Museum in Amsterdam (2020). Lund is the co-host of the Great Intentions podcast with Roel Wouters.

== Work ==
=== Artistic practice ===
Lund's artistic practice involves creating systems and setting up parameters that oftentimes require engagement from the viewer. This results in game-like artworks where tasks are executed according to algorithms or a set of rules. Through his works, Lund investigates the latest issues generated by the increasing digitalisation of contemporary society like authorship, participation and authority. At the same time, he questions the mechanisms of the art world; he challenges the production process, authoritative power and art market practices. A recurring theme in Lund's work is the relationship between quantification and value. His projects often expose how value is constructed through metrics, data, and collective behavior, revealing the arbitrary and circular nature of value production in both the art market and digital platforms. By making these mechanisms visible and participatory, Lund creates situations where viewers become complicit in the systems he critiques.

=== Artificial intelligence and automation ===
Since 2022, Lund has increasingly focused on artificial intelligence and its implications for creative labor, authorship, and the future of art production. His video trilogy consisting of "The Future of Nothing" (2023), "The Future of Something" (2023), and "The Future of Life" (2024) explores human anxieties about AI-driven automation through satirical narratives created in collaboration with various generative AI tools. These works examine the displacement of human creativity while simultaneously questioning the originality and value of much human-made art.

=== Selected works ===
==== The Fear of Missing Out (2013) ====
The Fear of Missing Out was an exhibition presented at Showroom MAMA in Rotterdam, taking its title from a social-network-induced anxiety condition describing the urge to keep up with a rapidly moving world and the fear of being left behind. The show proposed that it might be possible to stay one step ahead of the art world by using well-crafted algorithms and computational logic.

The works in the exhibition were generated from a computer algorithm written by Lund that analysed and categorised a large dataset of artworks by successful contemporary artists. From this analysis, the program produced a detailed set of step-by-step instructions describing how to make the "most successful" artworks. Lund then followed these algorithmic directives to produce the pieces in the show. By doing so, he questioned traditional art-world notions of authenticity, talent, and creativity, while highlighting the cultural obsession with quantification and optimisation.

Curated by Gerben Willers, the exhibition opened on 11 October 2013 following an in-situ production period in which Lund developed the works publicly within the space. The Fear of Missing Out also referred to the pervasive desire to participate in a transparent, interconnected information society—one governed by algorithms and real-time data flows.

==== Flip City (2014) ====
In 2014 Lund created a painting series called Flip City that was first exhibited at Steve Turner in Los Angeles. Each of the forty paintings had GPS trackers attached to the back that shared its current location once a day to the Flip City website. The work aimed to explore the manipulative nature of the art market, in particular the habit of a group of collectors to quickly sell and resell artworks for increased profits, typically referred to as 'flipping'.

==== VIP (Viewer Improved Painting) (2014) ====
VIP (Viewer Improved Painting) is a self-optimising digital painting consisting of two large monitors in custom metal frames with a gaze-tracking camera placed between them. By measuring the viewer's gaze, the work continuously tests different compositions and colour sets, iteratively approaching the most "optimal" and attention-grabbing image. The system evolves in real time, modifying its aesthetic output based on live audience engagement.

The technology of gaze tracking is commonly used in advertising, web usability, sponsorship, and design research. Lund's use of it within an art context critiques the quantification of aesthetic value and the increasing alignment between audience analytics and creative production. As the title suggests, VIP (Viewer Improved Painting) ironically positions every viewer as a "Very Important Person," yet their collective gaze merely feeds an optimisation algorithm. The work reflects how metrics of attention and popularity influence artistic decision-making in both online and institutional environments.

==== Studio Practice (2014) ====
Studio Practice was an exhibition held at Boetzelaer|Nispen Gallery in Amsterdam from 6 September to 11 October 2014. For the duration of the show, Lund transformed the gallery into a functioning production studio by hiring four assistants to create artworks according to a 300-page instruction manual written by the artist. Each completed work was evaluated online by an advisory board consisting of artists, collectors, and gallerists, who voted on whether the work should be signed by Lund or destroyed. The process was streamed live and archived on a dedicated website, studio-practice.biz, which displayed real-time footage, board assessments, and Lund's commentary.

The project exposed and gamified the mechanisms of authorship, labour, and delegation in contemporary art, blurring distinctions between artist and assistant, studio and gallery, production and critique. By outsourcing the making process while retaining the final authority of authorship, Studio Practice offered a transparent, performative reflection on the art world's own systems of evaluation and value creation.

==== Strings Attached (2015) ====
Strings Attached was a solo exhibition at Steve Turner Gallery in Los Angeles featuring 24 text-based paintings that relate to the contemporary art market bubble. Each work uses text that restricts the transfer of ownership in some way. Lund used fabric wallpaper as backgrounds for the works, with messages painted by a sign painter according to his directions. As a group, the 24 paintings encompass contradictory efforts made by gallerists who both want to fuel market momentum for their artists while trying to shield them from the damaging effects of quick-profit speculation. Examples from the series include "Control," which states "THIS PAINTING MAY NEVER BE OFFERED AT AUCTION"; "HUO," which reads "THIS PAINTING MAY ONLY BE PURCHASED BY A COLLECTOR WHO HAS APPEARED IN ARTFORUM'S SCENE & HERD AT LEAST FIVE TIMES"; "Loyalty," stating "THIS PAINTING MAY ONLY BE PURCHASED BY A COLLECTOR WHO AGREES TO PURCHASE TWO MORE WORKS BY THE ARTIST BEFORE MARCH 21, 2017"; and "Commitment," which declares "THIS PAINTING MAY ONLY BE PURCHASED BY A COLLECTOR WHO ALSO AGREES TO PURCHASE DONATION." "Donation" is a painting from the series that could only be purchased by a collector who agreed to donate it to one of six specified museums (Moderna Museet, MoMA, Tate, Hamburger Bahnhof, LACMA, or Stedelijk Museum) by 21 March 2020. The work was subsequently donated to the Stedelijk Museum in Amsterdam shortly before the deadline. The series examines the relationship between private collecting and public institutions while questioning how artworks gain legitimacy through institutional validation and the mechanisms of market control.

==== Fair Warning (2016) ====
Fair Warning is an online work jointly commissioned by the Whitechapel Gallery and Phillips, coinciding with the exhibition Electronic Superhighway (2016-1966). The work is a series of test environments installed on the websites of both institutions, designed to discover, measure and quantify taste profiles of the contemporary art audience. Over 300 rapidly changing tests, from simple questionnaires to visual comparison tests, are used to quantify and measure taste and personal preference as it relates to the general public. The project examines the value and use of data collection when attempting to represent user tastes and questions whether an objective way of measuring the value of art exists. Playing with expectations of traditional online questionnaires or personality tests, Fair Warning both embraces and attempts to demystify website analytics and testing tools. The clicks and cursors of all users can be seen when engaging with the work, making the data collection process visible. The results are distilled to relationships between hype mechanisms and value creation within the contemporary art world. In a society obsessed with quantification and metrics of evaluation, Fair Warning questions how the greater cultural value of art can be justified and funded if it cannot be measured or quantified until it is sold. The work was shortlisted for the net_based award in 2017 and is held in the collection of the Stedelijk Museum in Amsterdam.

==== Jonas Lund Token (2018) ====
In 2018, Lund created his own cryptocurrency, Jonas Lund Token, an ERC-20 token on top of the Ethereum Blockchain, that functions as voting shares in his artistic practice, thus giving birth to a new art form called "performance-art capitalism". Token holders, primarily art world participants including collectors, curators, and critics, vote on proposals submitted by Lund, determining which exhibitions he should pursue, what works he should create, and how his practice should develop. The project distributes agency across a decentralized network of stakeholders. The Jonas Lund Token explored how value is produced collectively within the art world, questioning traditional hierarchies of authorship and decision-making. The project includes a bounty program that rewards token holders for securing institutional opportunities for the artist, gamifying the mechanisms of career advancement in the art world.

==== Operation Earnest Voice: Brexit Division (2019) ====
In January 2019, in a performance/installation Lund set up an influencing agency titled Operation Earnest Voice at The Photographers' Gallery in London. The goal of the installation was to reverse Brexit, which caused some controversy and critique from the organisation Leave Means Leave due to The Photographers' Gallery status as a charity, in part funded by the Arts Council England, and as such should not be involved in political campaigning. In a public statement, the gallery said it had followed guidelines from the Charity Commission, consulted with Arts Council England, as well as taken legal advice "to ensure that the project complied with all appropriate regulations especially with regard to publicly funded, charitable institutions". As a result, it "would not adjust or shut down the project".

==== Talk to Me (2017) and Talk to Me Book Series (2019) ====
Talk to Me (2017) is an online conversational artwork presented as a chatbot "trained and modelled on all previous instant message conversations (Skype, WhatsApp, Facebook Messenger) as typed by the artist himself to create a smart, machine-learned, automatically talking version of the artist." In reality, as Jonas Lund later revealed, he was manually responding to every user through a Telegram interface, effectively performing the role of a bot. The project thereby inverted the expected relation between human and machine, transforming the artist into a "human-emulating-a-bot" and turning what appeared to be an automated conversation into a durational, participatory performance.

In 2019, the project evolved into the Talk to Me Book Series, a monumental printed archive of 36 volumes compiling the 1.6 million messages exchanged between 2017 and 2019. Conceived with artist and designer Federico Antonini, the publication was presented within the exhibition Hyperemployment at MGLC Ljubljana and published with Aksioma. The accompanying text by curator Domenico Quaranta describes the project as "a three-year, outsourced, unsuccessful effort to perform and re-enact the Turing Test," where the human and machine voices collapse into a hybrid, distributed identity.

As Quaranta notes, "it's thanks to this endless, flexible play on identity that Talk to Me becomes an apt metaphor of the human–software continuum that we experience online on a daily basis, with all its consequences and biases: the end of truth, the exploitation of AI to fake human communication, and the exploitation of humans to fake automation."

==== Smart Burn Contract (2021) ====
Smart Burn Contract is a series of contractual agreements that the owner enters upon purchase of the NFT piece. If the terms written on the piece are not fulfilled, the artist will burn the NFT and thus destroy it and remove it from the owner's wallet. One piece from this series, "Smart Burn Contract (Hoarder)," was acquired by the Centre Pompidou in 2023 as part of the museum's first major acquisition of NFT-based artworks.

==== MVP (Most Valuable Painting) (2022) ====
MVP (Most Valuable Painting) is an online participatory project by Jonas Lund, commissioned by Aorist and launched in April 2022. Questioning how we define the meaning of value in contemporary art across aesthetics, sales, engagement, and influence, MVP consists of 512 individual digital paintings that evolve and transform based on public reception, until they are acquired. Once an MVP is sold and minted as an NFT, the visual properties of that work determine the aesthetic evolution of the remaining works, which slowly optimize their features and composition to mimic the characteristics of the more desirable paintings. Each MVP's aesthetic outcome is determined by a fitness algorithm that tracks a range of factors, including each individual MVP's performance in terms of likability and attention-grabbing potential, and considerations such as likes, clicks, and user engagement. The series culminates with the Most Valuable Painting, which is ultimately influenced by the sales of the previous 511 MVPs; the last painting sold holds all the aesthetic value determined by viewer and collector preference.

Lund's project alludes to the consequence of quantifying value and how the art world and the new digital ecosystem create a unified sense of value when, in actuality, the value of an artwork is a complex interrelation of ever-changing factors alongside the subjective aesthetic tastes of the viewer. Artist Jonas Lund comments, "The work not only considers how we define the value of an artwork but also exposes the often-brutal commerciality of the art world and the expanding NFT-sphere. When an artwork is only championed in line with its sales merit, there will only be 'victory art' or 'bad art,' no engagement or critique in between."

In 2025, MVP (Most Valuable Painting) was awarded the inaugural Prix Arts numériques (Digital Arts Prize), jointly organized by the Fondation Etrillard and the Académie des beaux-arts in Paris. The award marks the first official recognition of digital art within the French Academy of Fine Arts.

==== By Opening This Book You Agree to All of the Following Terms (2022) ====
Published in 2022 as a numbered edition of 100, this artist's book functions as a binding contract between Lund and the reader. The book contains 200 blank pages, among which Lund has handwritten a unique URL for each copy, leading to a personalized webpage that reveals the specific terms the reader has agreed to by opening the book. Each copy is unique, and neither the reader nor anyone else knows the terms in advance. The work critiques the normalized practice of blindly accepting terms of service agreements online, transforming the act of reading into a legally binding transaction.

==== In the Middle of Nowhere (2023) ====
"In the Middle of Nowhere" was first presented at Office Impart in Berlin (2 February to 10 March 2023) and subsequently at Annka Kultys Gallery in London (through 4 June 2023) as "In the Middle of Nowhere II." The exhibition marked a significant moment in contemporary art as it was the first show to be created entirely in collaboration with ChatGPT, with Lund conducting extensive conversations with the AI to conceptualize and produce the works. The exhibition included "The Future of Nothing," a video work comprising short narratives speculating on the consequences of automation and AI for the art world; a series of tapestries created using the open-source Stable Diffusion model exploring power dynamics and value production; "Simulacra Aesthetics," an installation featuring a self-acting computer desktop that generates prompts and rates AI-generated images; "The End," a video displaying rolling credits that rewrite the roles of individuals throughout art history.

==== The Future of Series (2023–ongoing) ====
Lund's ongoing series of AI-generated video works examines human relationships with artificial intelligence through satirical narratives. Each piece in the series uses the most capable text-to-image, text-to-video, and text-to-audio tools available at the time of its creation, functioning as time capsules that freeze specific moments in the evolution of AI technology for video production.

===== The Future of Nothing (2023) =====
"The Future of Nothing" (2023, 10:59 min) comprises a series of short narratives speculating on the consequences of automation and AI for the art world and beyond. These vignettes offer a glimpse into a potential future and raising significant questions about the value of human labor and creativity in an increasingly automated environment. The work was featured as Video of the Month at HMKV Hartware MedienKunstVerein in Dortmund and was shortlisted for the Lumen Prize Moving Image Award in 2023.

===== The Future of Something (2023) =====
"The Future of Something" (2023, 13:41 min) takes a deep dive into the human anxieties framing an AI-driven world. Across the morphing vignettes of seven AI-generated human support groups, ranging from couples therapy to robot love tensions, online poker addicts to content creators anonymous, the video explores familiar fears of machinic displacement of the self through the drama of parody. It shows hallucinated influencers in crisis, unable to compete with the indifferent gaze of an artificial intelligence that doesn't care about authenticity or creativity. The video suggests that the real threat in the room may not be the machinic other, but something more human after all.

===== The Future of Life (2024) =====
"The Future of Life" (2024, 28:02 min) depicts a life sciences company pushing to release immortality technology while internal politics and human emotions threaten the launch. Each film in the series is made in close collaboration with a range of different generative AI tools, and as products of AI technology, the works demonstrate the rapid advancements in video and image processing capabilities.

==== How to Be Human (2024) ====
A clinical examination of human behavior through an artificial lens, this short film explores the gap between algorithmic perfection and human performance. Through nine everyday scenarios, from drinking coffee to dancing, we witness repeated attempts to achieve "perfect" human actions, each narrated with mechanical precision. As each scene repeats three times with subtle variations, a fascinating tension emerges between intended perfection and generated reality. The piece serves as both a meditation on the future of human behavior and a meta-commentary on artificial intelligence's attempt to understand and replicate human actions.

==== Network Maintenance (2025) ====
Network Maintenance is a series of networked wall-mounted interfaces that explore the relationship between ownership, care, and collective responsibility. Each piece consists of a minimalist custom construction housing a display and various analog controls. The works function as nodes in an interconnected system where each owner's engagement directly influences the vitality of the entire network. The interface requires regular interaction from its owner, pressing buttons in specific sequences or responding to shifting patterns. This transforms the traditional passive role of art ownership into active participation in a living system. Without proper care, individual pieces begin to show signs of decay, affecting both their own state and the broader network of works in the series. Drawing inspiration from quantum mechanics, the artwork embodies principles of entanglement and superposition. Just as entangled quantum particles instantaneously influence each other regardless of distance, each owner's actions create ripple effects throughout the entire network of installations. Each interface displays various visual states that reflect the network's health metrics: stability, responsiveness, and connectivity.

== Collections ==
Lund's work is held in the collections of:

- Centre Pompidou, Paris
- Stedelijk Museum, Amsterdam
- ZKM, Karlsruhe

== See also ==
- Conceptual Art
- Media Art
- Internet Art
