= Operator (artist duo) =

Artist duo based in Madrid

Operator is an artist duo composed of Ania Catherine and Dejha Ti. The duo is based in Madrid and have worked collaboratively since 2016. They are known for creating conceptual large-scale installations that have been exhibited internationally in museums, galleries and festivals.

== Background ==
Operator was started in 2016 in Los Angeles. Prior to Operator, Ti worked as a multimedia artist and human and computer interaction (HCI) technologist, creating immersive, interactive installations. Catherine is a choreographer and performance artist; she works with the human body as a medium and holds a master's degree in Gender & Policy.

== Work ==
The artwork of the artist duo in Operator bridges several artistic mediums but is mainly experiential focusing on conceptual art and immersive environments, with an approach to technology. Through their work, they focus on bringing the body into digital art, and exploring the shifting nature of performance in the context of modern technological influences. Since 2019, they have explored the subject of privacy in their work. They engage and immerse audiences not just physically, but also highlight the emotional and psychological aspects of immersion as a state. They have spoken about their work at events and institutions including Christie's Art+Tech Summit, University of Cambridge, Art Basel, ZKM, and MIT Open Documentary Lab.

=== Notable artworks ===
- ‘On View’ commissioned by the SCAD Museum of Art
- ‘Let me check with the wife’
- ‘I’d rather be in a dark silence than’
- ‘Soft Evidence’
- ‘Automatiste’ at London Fashion Week
- ‘The Privacy Collection’

== Awards ==
In 2023, Operator won their second Lumen Prize in the Generative Art category. In 2021, they won a Lumen Prize in the Immersive Environments category, a Gold Cube from the 100th Annual ADC Awards for I'd rather be in a dark silence than, and an Honorary Mention for the STARTS Prize for On View. Operator won ADC Awards for Experiential Design in 2020 and was shortlisted for the 2020 Lumen Prize for Art and Technology in the 3D/Interactive category for On View.
