= Maja Petrić =

Croatian-American new media artist (born 1981)

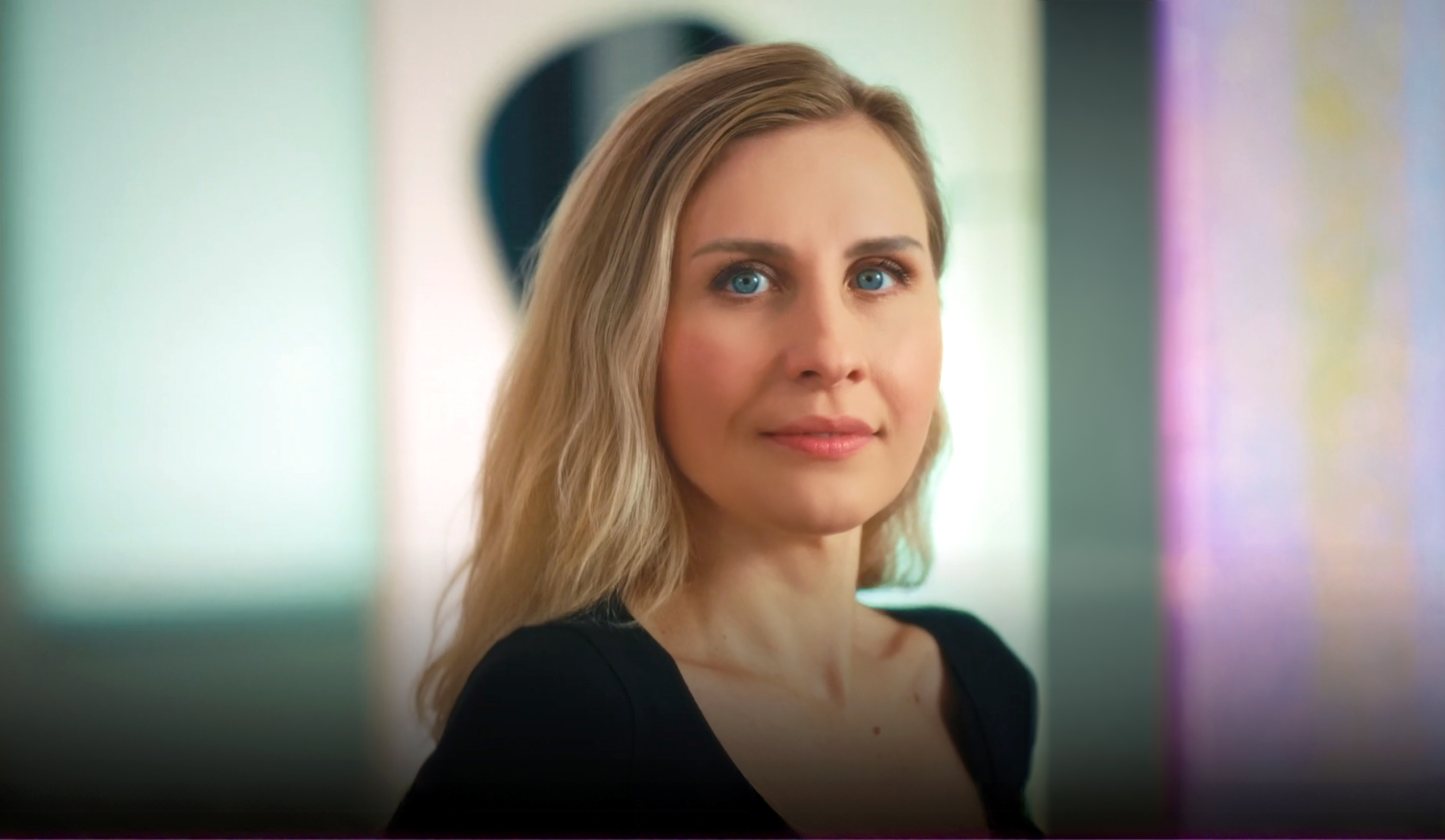
- Portrait of Maja Petrić, 2025
- Born: 1981 (age 44–45); Zagreb, Croatia
- Education: University of Washington (PhD); New York University's Tisch School of the Arts (Interactive Telecommunications Program); University of Zagreb (MA)
- Known for: New media art, Installation art, Light art
- Awards: 3D/Interactive Award, Lumen Prize for Art and Technology (2019); Digital Art Award for Innovation, Phillips & HOFA Gallery (2025)

Maja Petrić (born 1981) is a Croatian-American new media and installation art artist whose work uses light, computational systems, and environmental data to create immersive installations exploring perception, ecological systems, and the relationship between technology and the natural world.

Her work has been discussed in international media including The Seattle Times, BBC Future, and Deutsche Welle in relation to AI art, immersive environments, and climate-focused artistic practice.

Petrić received the 3D/Interactive Award at the Lumen Prize for Art and Technology in 2019 and the Digital Art Award for Innovation presented by Phillips and HOFA Gallery in 2025.

== Education ==
Petrić received a PhD in Digital Arts and Experimental Media from the University of Washington. She earned a Master of Professional Studies from New York University's Tisch School of the Arts in the Interactive Telecommunications Program (ITP), and a master’s degree from the University of Zagreb.

== Critical reception ==
Petrić’s work has been discussed in relation to artificial intelligence, environmental data, and immersive media art. Media outlets including BBC Future, Deutsche Welle, and The Seattle Times have referenced her installations in discussions about the role of art in communicating climate data and technological transformation.

Coverage of her installation We Are All Made of Light described the work as an immersive environment in which viewers experience evolving constellations of light.

Academic literature has also examined Petrić’s work in the context of data-driven art practices that translate environmental information into sensory experience.

== Work ==
Petrić’s installations combine light sculpture, computational systems, and real-time environmental inputs.

Her installation We Are All Made of Light (2018), presented at MadArt Studio in Seattle, created an immersive light environment shaped by interactive systems and was reviewed in arts publications including City Arts Magazine and The Stranger.

Lost Skies (2017–2019) employed computational analysis of atmospheric imagery to generate evolving visual compositions and has been discussed in media coverage of artists working with artificial intelligence and climate data.

Her ongoing series Specimens of Time translates environmental and climate-related data into luminous spatial forms using generative systems and environmental inputs.

Petrić has created installations for institutions and technology companies, including We the Light, a large-scale interactive installation commissioned for Meta’s Open Arts program.

=== Selected works ===
- Lost Skies (2017–2019)
- We Are All Made of Light (2018)
- Constellation: We Are All Made of Light (2020)

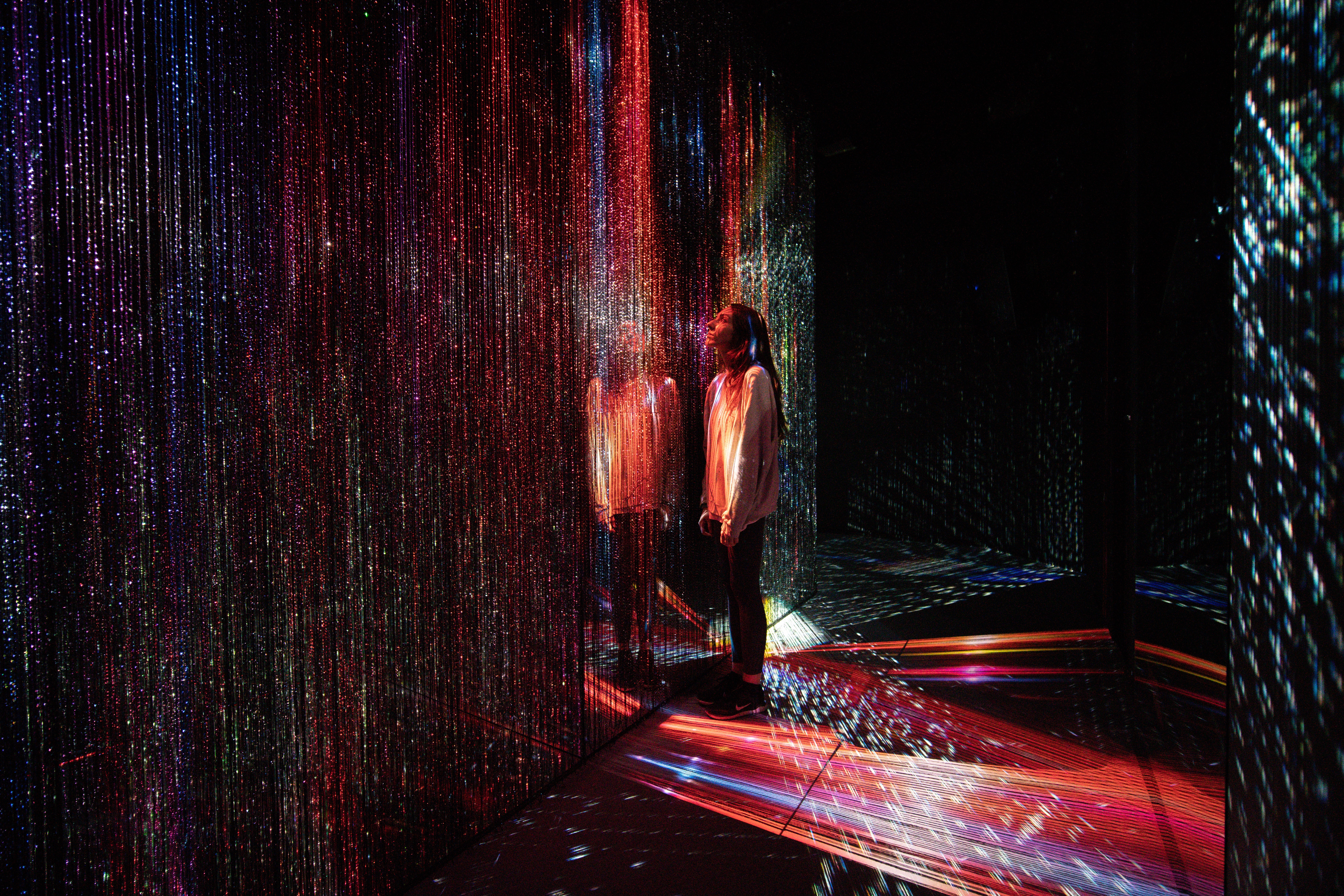
Installation view of Constellation: We Are All Made of Light at Farol Santander Cultural, São Paulo, 2020.

- Specimens of Time (2024–present)
- We the Light (2024)

== Exhibitions ==
=== Solo exhibitions ===
- 2012 – Eyes of the Skin II, Henry Art Gallery, Seattle
- 2018 – We Are All Made of Light, MadArt Studio, Seattle
- 2020 – Constelação: Somos Feitos de Luz, Farol Santander Cultural, São Paulo
- 2024 – Specimens of Time, The Vestibule, Seattle

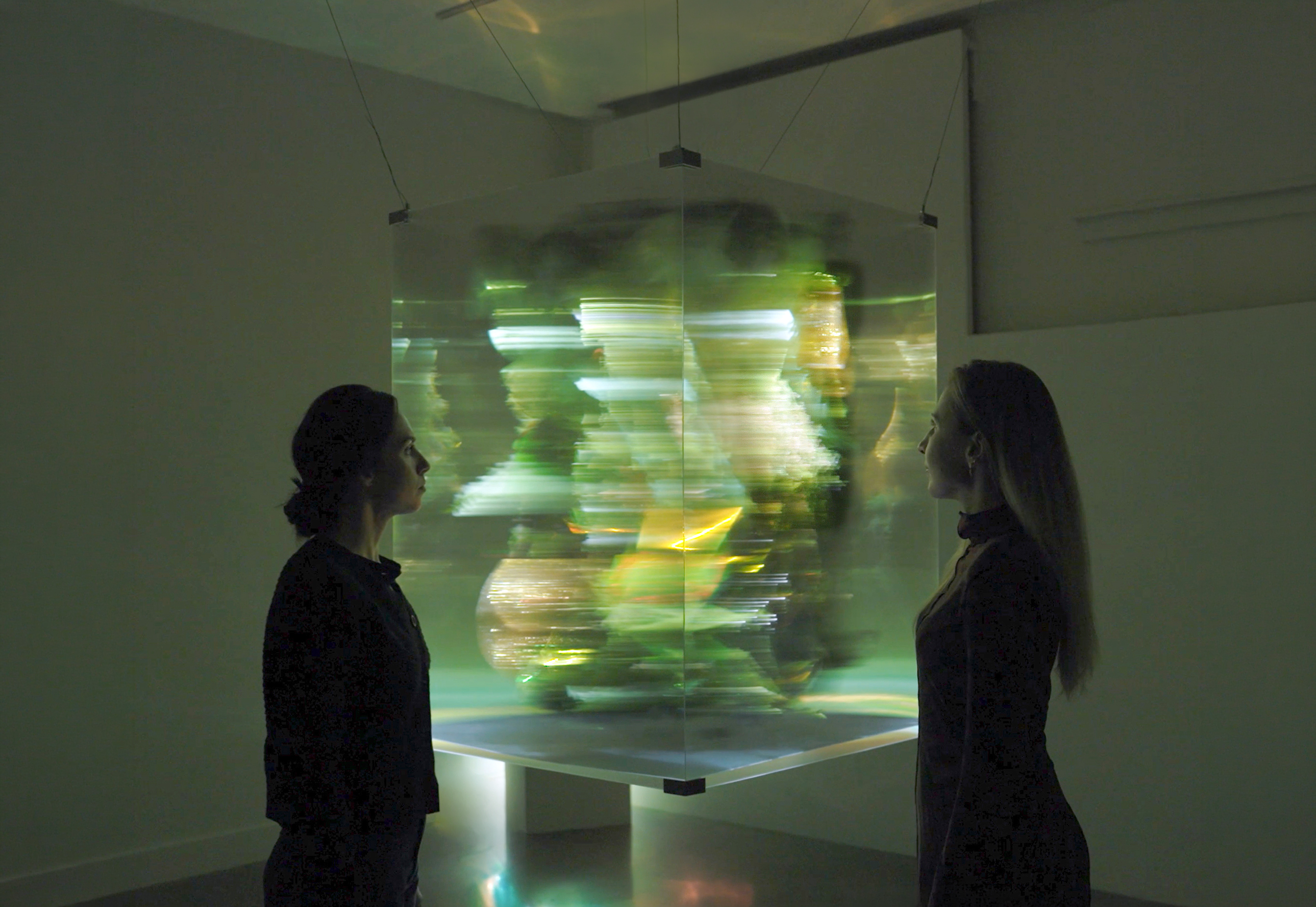
Installation view of Specimens of Time at The Vestibule, Seattle.

- 2025 – Spectrum: Specimens of Time, HOFA Gallery, London
- 2025 – Specimens of Time: Mykonos, Scorpios Encounters, Mykonos

=== Group exhibitions ===
- 2021 – Lands End, For-Site Foundation, San Francisco
- 2024 – Glow in the Dark, Jacob Lawrence Gallery, University of Washington
- 2025 – SPACES II: Capturing the Ephemera, Phillips, Hong Kong
- 2025 – Digital Art Awards, Phillips, London
- 2026 – GLOW, Exploratorium, San Francisco

== Awards ==
- 2019 – 3D/Interactive Award, Lumen Prize for Art and Technology.
- 2025 – Digital Art Award for Innovation, presented by Phillips and HOFA Gallery.

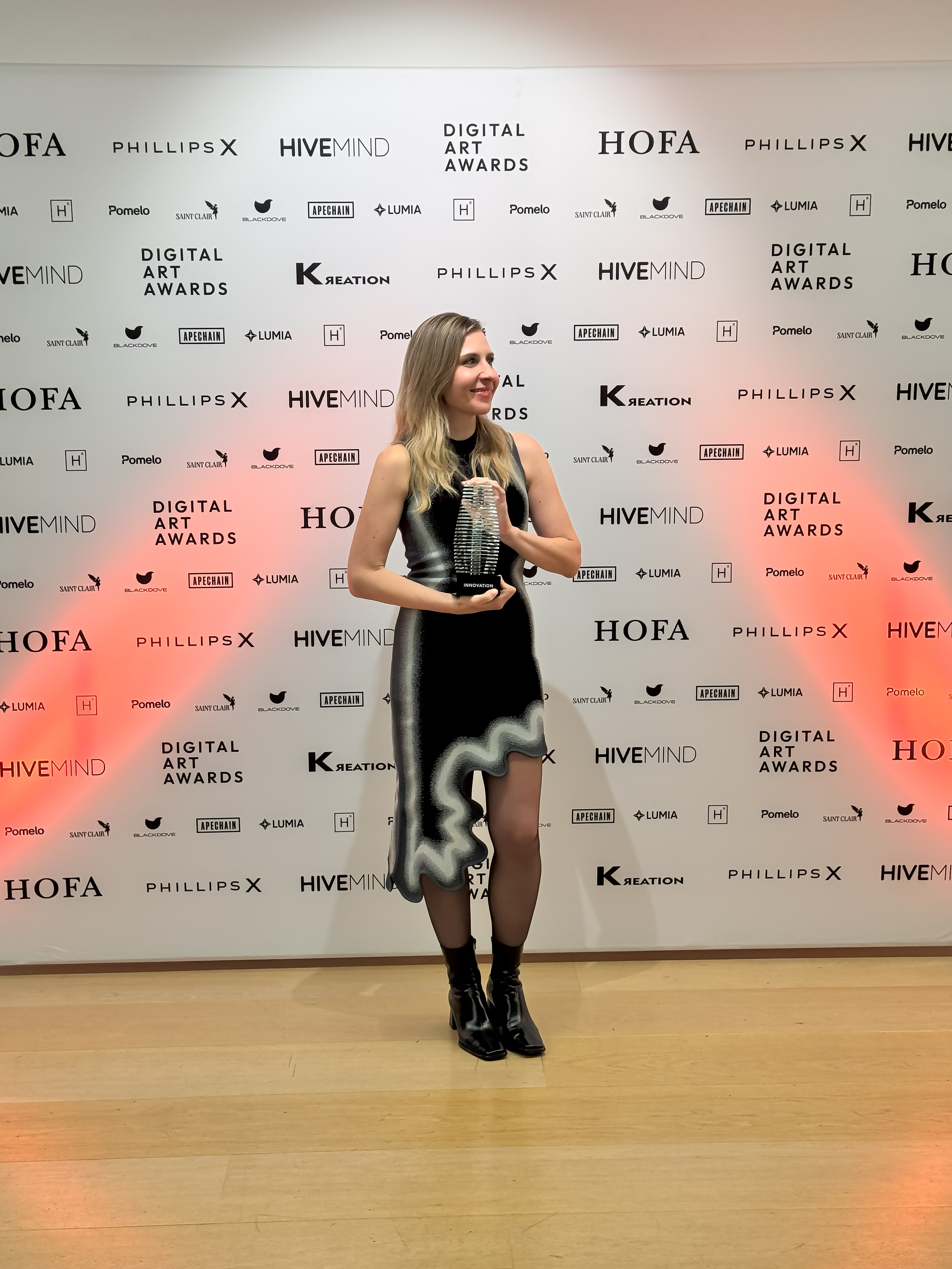
Maja Petrić receiving the Digital Art Award for Innovation at the Digital Art Awards presented by PhillipsX and HOFA Gallery, London, 2025.
