= Kim H. Veltman =

Dutch/Canadian historian of science and art (1948–2020)

Kim Henry Veltman
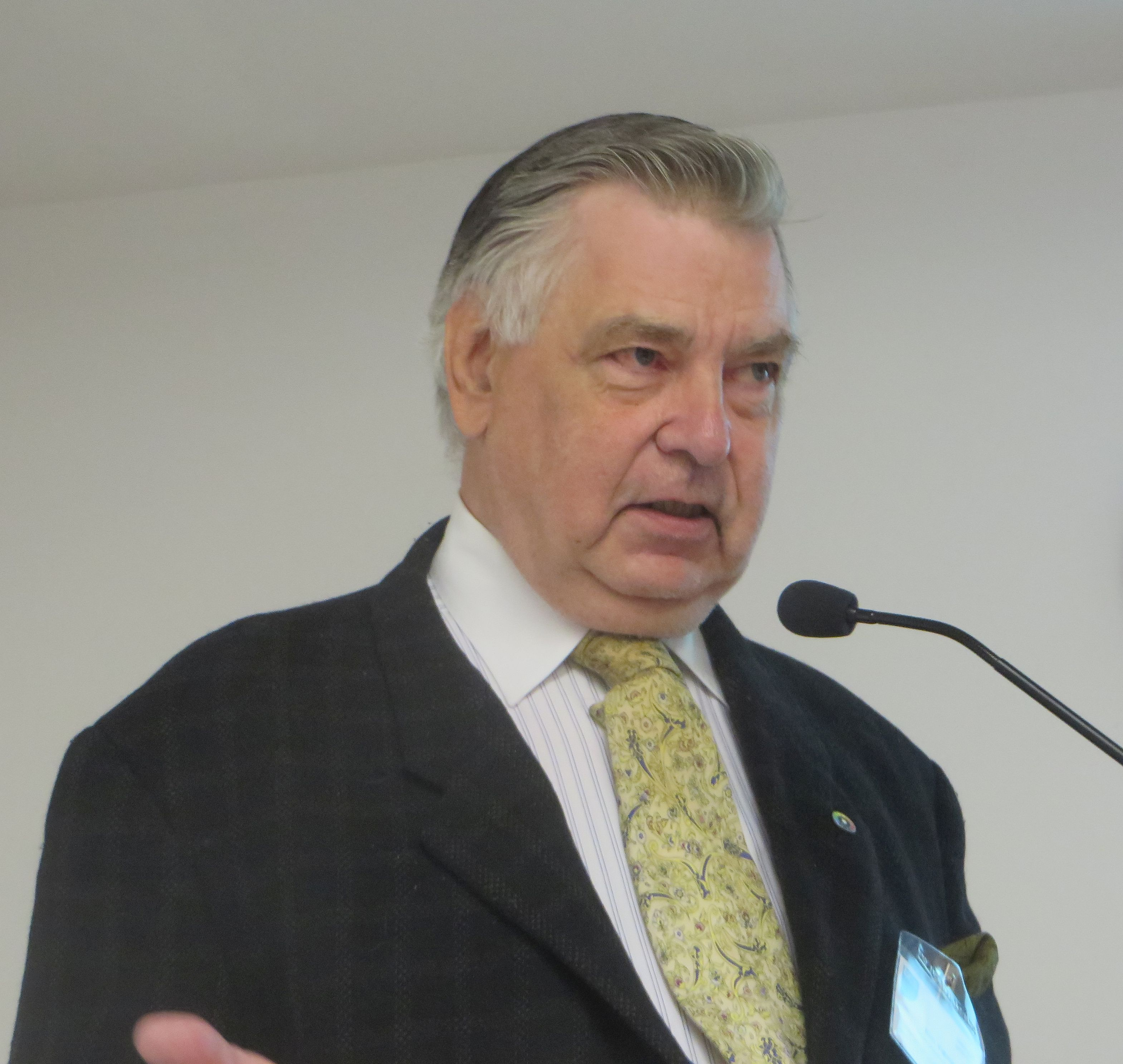
- Veltman in 2017
- Born: 5 September 1948; Workum, Friesland, Netherlands
- Died: 1 April 2020 (aged 71); Maastricht, Limburg, Netherlands
- Occupation(s): Historian of science and art
- Notable work: Studies on Leonardo da Vinci I, 1986

Kim (Keimpe) Henry Veltman (5 September 1948 – 1 April 2020) was a Dutch-Canadian historian, consultant and author who was director of the Virtual Maastricht McLuhan Institute (VMMI). He is known for his contributions in the fields of "linear perspective and the visual dimensions of science and art," new media, culture and society.

== Biography ==
Born in Workum in Friesland, Veltman emigrated with his family in 1951, where he obtained Canadian citizenship. Veltman obtained his BA in history at York University in Toronto in 1969, where in 1970 he also obtained his MA in renaissance history. In 1975 he received his PhD in history and philosophy of science at the Warburg Institute in London, where he had received education from B.A.R. Carter, Alistair Cameron Crombie, Ernst Gombrich, A.I. Sabra, and Charles B. Schmitt.

After his graduation and some years in research and in industry as a post-doctoral fellow, he started as Assistant Professor and Canada Research Fellow at the University of Toronto in 1984. From 1990 to 1995 he was director of the Perspective Unit of the McLuhan Program at the Faculty of Education of the University of Toronto. In 1998 he moved to Maastricht, where he became director of Maastricht McLuhan Institute. Since 2006 he was Scientific Director of the Virtual Maastricht McLuhan Institute. Over the years he has been Visiting Professor at the University of Göttingen in 1983–84; at the University of Siena in 1991; at the Sapienza University of Rome in 1992; at the Università di Roma II in 1995; and at Carleton University in 1994–96.

Veltman speaking at the EVA London 2017 conference

In July 2017, he was a keynote speaker at the EVA London 2017 Conference. Veltman died of COVID-19 in 2020. The EVA London 2020 Conference proceedings was dedicated to his memory, including a eulogy by his colleague Carl Smith and others.

== Work ==
=== Studies on Leonardo da Vinci I, 1986 ===
In his 1986 book "Studies on Leonardo da Vinci I: Linear Perspective and the Visual Dimensions of Science and Art," Veltman gave a new evaluation of the work of Leonardo da Vinci by focusing upon "Leonardo's visual as opposed to his verbal statements."

=== Virtual Maastricht McLuhan Institute ===
The Virtual Maastricht McLuhan Institute (VMMI) is an institute for new media, named after Marshall McLuhan. The institute was founded in 1998 as Maastricht McLuhan Institute, and renamed to 2004.

The institute explores the "historical effects of new media on the trivium (grammar, logic and rhetoric) and the quadrivium (geometry, astronomy, arithmetic and music) - or the arts and sciences - and implications for those effects on knowledge and culture then and today. VMMI proposes to continue these explorations, with a new focus: Knowledge Organization and Cultural Computing."

== Selected publications ==
- Veltman, Kim H.; Keele, Kenneth David (1986), Studies on Leonardo da Vinci I: Linear perspective and the visual dimensions of science and art, vol. 1, Munich: Deutscher Kunstverlag, ISBN 978-3422007734
- Veltman, Kim H. (2006), Understanding new media: augmented knowledge & culture, University of Calgary Press, ISBN 978-1552381540
- Veltman, Kim H (1986), Perspective, anamorphosis and vision (PDF), Marburger Jahrbuch für Kunstwissenschaft
- Kim H. Veltman (1997), "Frontiers in Electronic Media" (PDF), Interactions Journal of the ACM, archived from the original (PDF) on 3 March 2016
- Veltman, Kim H. (2001), "Syntactic and semantic interoperability: new approaches to knowledge and the semantic web" (PDF), New Review of Information Networking, 7: 159–183, doi:10.1080/13614570109516975, S2CID 10544290
- Veltman, Kim H. (2006), "Towards a semantic web for culture", Journal of Digital Information 4.4
- Veltman, Kim H. (2014), "Alphabets of Life", retrieved 29 August 2020
