= Kirk Martinez =

British computer scientist and academic

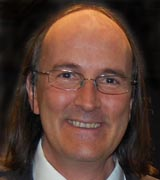
- Education: University of Reading, University of Essex
- Scientific career
- Fields: Digital imaging Wireless Sensor Network

Kirk Martinez is a Professor in Electronics and Computer Science at the University of Southampton UK. He gained a BSc in Physics from the University of Reading and a PhD in Image Processing in the department of Electronic Systems Engineering at the University of Essex. While Arts Computing Lecturer at Birkbeck College London (1987–96) he pioneered the digital imaging of paintings together with The National Gallery, London in the European project VASARI (1980s). This led to development of art imaging projects to print accurate art books (MARC project), view high detail images on the web (Viseum project) and find art images online (Artiste, SCULPTEUR and eCHASE). He has published this research in books on image processing and computer architecture as well as Transactions of the IEEE on content-based image retrieval He was an advisor on the imaging and image processing required for the Archimedes Palimpsest. Recent research led to a new imaging system for ancient seals together with Oxford University - which is helping to capture and read historic texts.

He is one of the founders of the Electronics and the Visual Arts: EVA Conferences. He helped to found the Earth and Space Science Informatics focus group of the American Geophysical Union, was on the executive committee and has run ten annual sessions on applying sensor networks to earth science. In 2017 he received the AGU's Leptoukh award for contributions to this area.

He is the co-founder of the VIPS (software) image processing package together with John Cupitt (while at the National Gallery London). This is used widely and available as a standard package in Linux distributions as well as for Microsoft Windows/OS X. It is known for mosaicing, colour and parallel processing/performance. It has become the fastest way to generate thumbnails and resize images on web servers so is in use in Wikipedia itself and sites such as Booking.com.

His current research is on Environmental Sensor Networks which are wireless sensor networks for studying/monitoring the environment, particularly in relation to glaciers and climate change (Glacsweb project). This research featured on BBC technology news and the BBC's News, it was the first wireless sensor network designed to be used in/under glaciers. His work to test the technology for landslide detection was also on BBC news. In 2014 he deployed what was probably the first low power, sub-GHz, 6LoWPAN fully-IP based Internet of Things environmental sensor network in the Cairngorms.
