= Electronic Workshops in Computing =

Publication series by the British Computer Society

Electronic Workshops in Computing (eWiC) is a publication series by the British Computer Society.

The series provides free online access for conferences and workshops in the area of computing. For example, the EVA London Conference proceedings on Electronic Visualisation and the Arts has appeared in the series since 2008, indexed by DBLP. Physical proceedings are also provided for conferences and workshops as well if required.

The series is ISSN 1477-9358. A conference archive is freely available online from 1995.

== See also ==
- Lecture Notes in Computer Science
