= Event One =

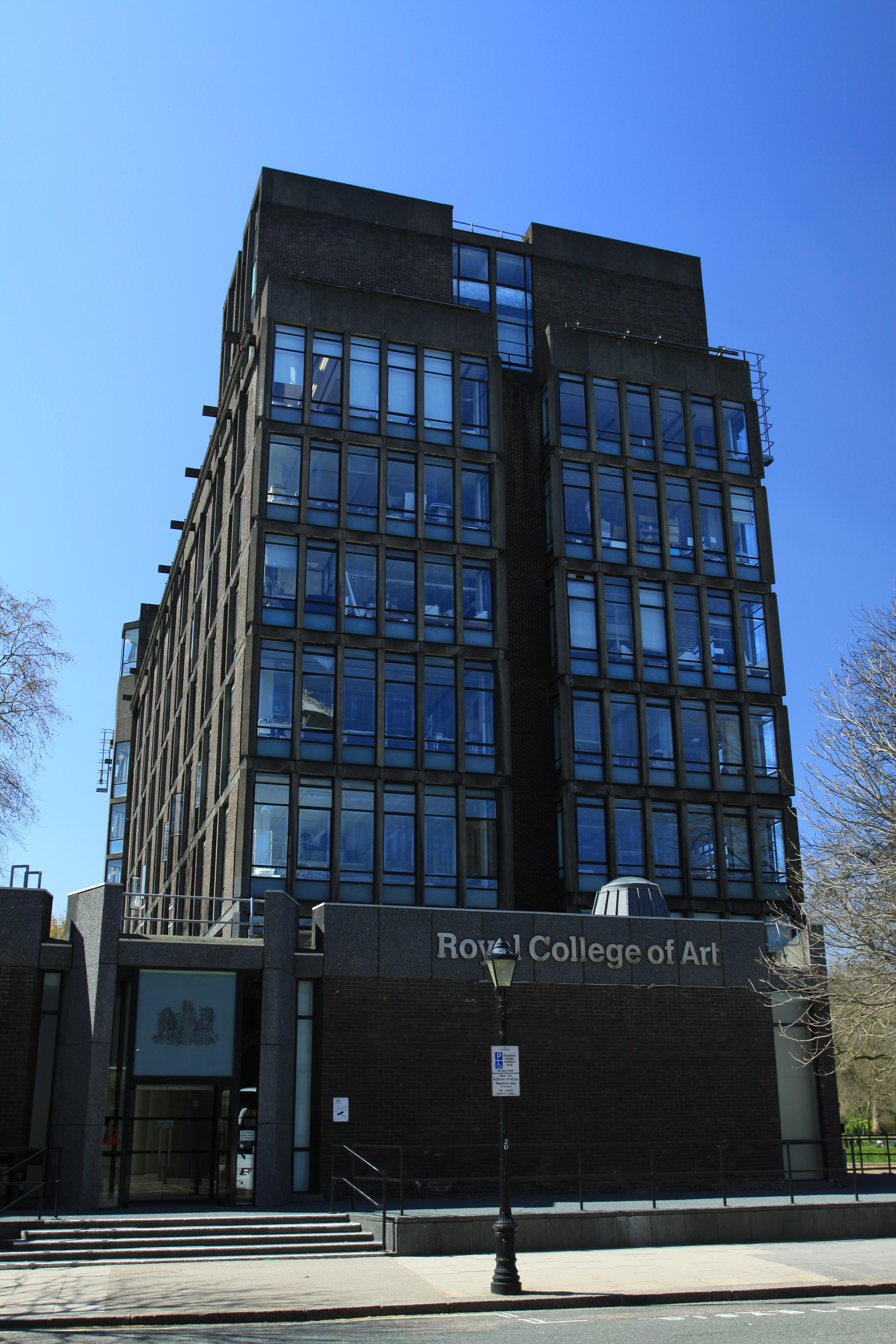
The Royal College of Art in London, where Event One and Event Two were held in 1969 and 2019 respectively

Event One was an early digital art exhibition held at the Royal College of Art (RCA), London, England, in 1969.

Event One was organised over two days during 29–30 March 1969 in the Gulbenkian Hall at the RCA by the Computer Arts Society (CAS), that had been established the year before in 1968. An associated catalogue was produced. The exhibition was reviewed in Page, the Bulletin of the Computer Arts Society. Since Event One, CAS has donated its collection to the Victoria and Albert Museum in London.

== Event Two ==
Event Two was organised at the RCA during 12–17 July 2019 to celebrate the 50th anniversary of Event One, including some digitally-produced artworks by artists, who also exhibited at Event One. Event Three is planned for 2069.

== See also ==
- Cybernetic Serendipity exhibition, Institute of Contemporary Arts, London, 1968
