= Lumen Prize =

Annual digital art award

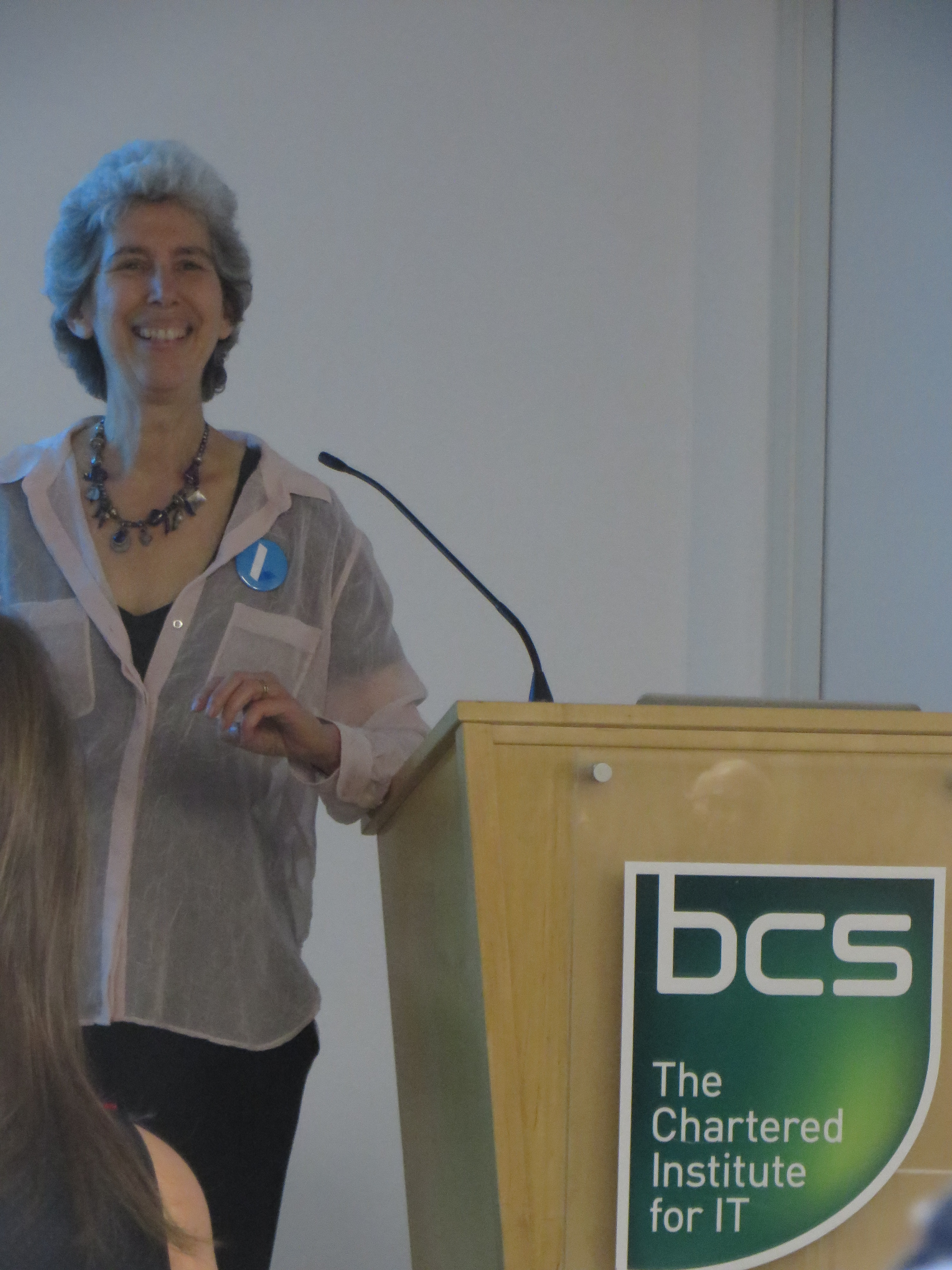
Carla Rapoport giving a presentation on the Lumen Prize at the EVA London 2016 conference in July 2016

The Lumen Prize is an international award which celebrates art created with technology, especially digital art.

== Overview ==
The prize was founded by Carla Rapoport in 2012, The Lumen Prize has visited more than ten cities around the world including Amsterdam, Athens, Hong Kong, New York, Riga, Swansea and Shanghai.

Through its parent company Lumen Art Projects, which promotes the work of longlisted, shortlisted and winning artists, Lumen has collaborated with the Barbican Centre, Computer Arts Society and the EVA London Conferences as well as the Tate, Photomonitor, Goldsmiths, University of London, Eureka! (Halifax), the British Computer Society, IBM UK, the Royal College of Art (London), CYLAND Media Lab (Saint Petersburg), etc.

Since its launch, the Lumen Prize has given away more than $80,000 in prize money and staged over 45 exhibitions globally.

== Prize winners ==
Past Lumen Prize Gold Award winners include artists Refik Anadol, Andy Lomas, Gibson/Martelli and Mario Klingemann. The 2019 shortlist was profiled by SeditionArt.

2023 winners

- Lumen Prize Gold Award: AUTO{}Construccion by CNDSD and IVAN ABREU (México)
- Crypto Art Award Winner: Proof of War by Egor Kraft (Tokyo ↔ Vienna)
- Student Award Winner: Hyborg Agency by UchanSun
- BCS Futures Award Winner: Critical Climate Machine by Gaëtan Robillard (France)
- Moving Image Award Winner: Ana Min Wein (Where Am I From?) by Nouf Aljowaysir (United States)
- HUA Award 華艺数奖: How Deep Is the Dark Water? by Rhett Tsai (China)
- Nordic Award Winner: Nest of You by Wang & Söderström (Denmark)
- Still Image Award Winner: JPEG FROM A VERNACULAR OF FILE FORMATS, (2009 - 2010), 2023 REVISITATION WITH HIDDEN MESSAGE IN DCT. by Rosa Menkman (Netherlands)
- Metaversal Generative Art Award Winner: Human Unreadable by Operator (United States)
- 3D/Interactive Award Winner: Between the Lines by Sarah Selby (United Kingdom)
- Immersive Environment Award Winner: Dreamachine by Collective Act (United Kingdom)
- Global Majority Award Winner: Dzata: The Institute of Technological Consciousness by Francois Knoetze, Russel Hlongwane and Amy Louise Wilson (South Africa)

2022 winners

- Lumen Prize Gold Award: Jitr(จิตร) by Nitcha Tothong & Kengchakaj Kengkarnka (United States)
- 3D/Interactive Award Winner: RADIO GHOST by ZU-UK (United Kingdom)
- Global Majority Award Winner: Amaroid by Arjan Emmanuel Sanchez Guerrero (United Kingdom)
- Moving Image Award Winner: Portrait of the Jungle People / 山芭佬 (San-Ba-Lou) by Eddie Wong (Malaysia)
- Nordic Award Winner: Homage to Airway by Sophia Ioannou Gjerding (Denmark)
- NFT Award Winner: Rituals - Venice by Aaron Penne x Boreta (United States)
- Still Image Award Winner: For What It's Worth by Dillon Marsh (South Africa)
- HUA Award Winner: Melting Myth by Gong Yining & Sun Aijia (China)
- Student Award Winner: Jewels of the Sea by Maximilian Seeger (Germany)
- BCS Immersive Environment Award Winner: Ent- by Libby Heaney (United Kingdom)
- Futures Award Winner: The Future Tense by Russell Perkins (United Kingdom)

2021 winners

- Lumen Prize Gold Award: Gold Award Winner UNINVITED by Nye Thompson & UBERMORGEN
- Moving Image Award Winner: El Salto (The Jump/ The Waterfall) by Juan Covelli
- Still Image Award Winner:Sylvia by Ziv Schneider
- 3D/Interactive Award Winner: Zoom, Click, Waltz by Sarah Choo Jing
- Futures Award Winner: Amazon Air (2021) by Gottfried Haider
- Global South Award Winner: IGÚN by Minne Atairu
- Nordic Award Winner:Centaur by Pontus Lidberg & Cecilie Waagner Falkenstrøm
- Student Award Winner: Arcadia Inc. by Cezar Mocan
- BCS Immersive Environment Award Winner: I'd rather be in a dark silence than by Ania Catherine & Dejha Ti

2020 winners

- Lumen Prize Gold Award: La Victoria by Julieta Gil
- Moving Image Award: Compressed Cinema by Casey Reas
- Still Image Award: Terram in Aspectu by Liliana Farber
- 3D Interactive Award: Hertzian Landscapes by Richard Vijgen
- XR Award:(Un)Balanced by Elyne Legarnisson
- Global South Award: Cosmos Within Us by Tupac Martir
- Nordic Award: Deux Mille by Søren Krag
- BCS AI Award: Helin by Christian Mio Loclair
- Photomonitor Student Prize: Racing Thoughts by Liu Wa

2019 winners

- Lumen Prize Gold Award: Melting Memories by Refik Anadol
- Moving Image Award: Love Birds, Night Birds, Devil Birds by Cassie McQuater
- Still Image Award: Drawing Operations by Sougwen Chung
- BCS AI Award: Lichtsuchende by Dave Murray-Rust and Rocio von Jungenfeld
- 3D/Interactive Award: We Are All Made of Light by Maja Petrić
- XR Award: Trail of Angels by Kristina Buozyte & Vitalijus Zukas
- People’s Choice Award: Phygital Palimpest by Stefan Gant
- Photomonitor Student Award: A Capricious Pathway by Cassie Suche
- Rapoport Award for Women in Art and Tech: Resurrecting the Sublime, 2019 by Alexandra Daisy Ginsberg, Dr. Christina Agapakis/Gingo Bioworks, and Sissel Tolaas

2018 winners

- Lumen Prize Gold Award: The Butcher’s Son by Mario Klingemann (Germany)
- Moving Image Award: Avyakrta: The Unanswered Questions by Sungjae Lee (South Korea)
- 3D/Interactive Award: Fidgety (In between up and down) by GayBird (Hong Kong)
- AR/VR Award: Tree by New Reality Company (UK)
- Still Image Award: Overload (Consequence) by Mark Lyons (UK)
- Rapoport Award for Women in Digital Art: In Defence of Industry by Felicity Hammond (UK)
- People’s Choice Award: Aerobanquets RMX by Mattia Casalegno (Italy, based in USA) with Flavio Gignoni Cartestia (food art), Mattheu Cherubini (coding), Martux_M (audio), Fito Segrera (tech assistance)
- BCS Artificial Intelligence Award: Degenerative Cultures Cesar & Lois An artwork by Cesar Baio and The League of Imaginary Scientists (Lois). Contributors: Scott Morgans (biologist)
- Meural Student Prize: The Punishment of Tantalus by Ziwei Wu (China)
