= Computer Arts Society =

- Abbreviation: CAS
- Formation: 1968
- Founders: Alan Sutcliffe; George Mallen; John Lansdown
- Founded at: London
- Location: London, United Kingdom
- Region served: United Kingdom
- Services: Member organization EVA London Conference; Computer Arts Archive
- Field: Digital art
- Official language: English
- Key people: Paul Brown; Sean Clark; Nick Lambert
- Parent organization: BCS
- Website: computer-arts-society.com

The Computer Arts Society (CAS) was founded in 1968, in order to encourage the creative use of computers in the arts.

== Foundation ==
The three founder members of the Society – Alan Sutcliffe, George Mallen, and John Lansdown – had been involved with computing and its related concepts for some time. They knew Jasia Reichardt, the curator of Cybernetic Serendipity (1968) and had participated in or advised on aspects of the exhibition. Sutcliffe was involved with the exhibition through his collaboration with composer Peter Zinovieff and Electronic Music Studios (EMS). Mallen was working with the English cybernetician Gordon Pask at Systems Research and assisted on the production of the interactive robotic work Colloquy of Mobiles shown at the exhibition. Although not mentioned in the catalogue credits, Reichardt knew and respected Lansdown, who from 1963, had used computing techniques in architectural design and planning.

The original idea for a society dedicated to the computer arts (which was to become the Computer Arts Society) was instigated by Sutcliffe, at the IFIP (International Federation for Information Processing) Congress in August 1968 in Edinburgh. Sutcliffe and Zinovieff had won second prize with ZASP, their piece of computer-composed music. Members of the Congress suggested to Sutcliffe that he might like to convene a meeting of people working in a similar field whilst they were all together at the Congress, as most had not had a chance to meet like-minded persons outside their own team before. Sutcliffe collated the names of interested individuals and the group formed out of this, with the first meetings in London held in a room belonging to University College London, in or near Gower Street in September 1968. Subsequent meetings were often held at the offices of Lansdown’s architectural practice (he became the Secretary with Sutcliffe the Chairman and Mallen, Treasurer.)

The Computer Arts Society was founded to encourage the creative use of computers and to allow the exchange of information in this area. It was recognised that this was an area where there had been increasing activity, but with little formal publication of methods and results and little communication between artists in different fields (music, visual, performing arts, and so on).

== Early activities ==
At this time Sutcliffe was a programmer at International Computers Limited (ICL) in Bracknell, Berkshire with the official title of Manager of New Series Branch. His area of expertise and responsibility covered what today is called 'research and development of software'. He has commented that ICL was always supportive of his outside artistic endeavours, offering for example, allocation of time on the mainframes, which he undertook mostly outside of peak hours. As the Bracknell branch of ICL did not initially have a mainframe computer, Sutcliffe would occasionally travel to the Putney, London branch. This was located across the River Thames from EMS and this facilitated his collaboration with Zinovieff. Sutcliffe brought the paper tape of a music program he had written at ICL to Zinovieff to “realise” and thus began their collaboration, with Sutcliffe assisting the Studio by writing software for the synthesizers they produced. Zinovieff is recognised as having revolutionised electronic and avant-garde music and EMS was used by Sir Harrison Birtwistle, Stockhausen and Pink Floyd among others.

CAS supported practitioners through a network of meetings, conferences, practical courses, social events, exhibitions and occasionally, through funding. It ran code-writing workshops, held several important exhibitions, co-operated with the Scottish Arts Council at the Edinburgh Festival and produced a bulletin. PAGE was initially published from April 1969 until 1985 and was named after the concept of paging (the use of disk memory as a virtual store which had been introduced on the Ferranti Atlas Computer). It featured major British and international computer artists and hosted some fundamental discussions as to the aims and nature of computer art. Its first editor was Gustav Metzger (who named the journal), thereby establishing from the beginning an association with the avant-garde. Metzger was ‘excited’ to discover CAS and ‘people coming together’ as he had ‘felt quite isolated.’ As early as 1961, Metzger had stated that ‘…the artist may collaborate with scientists, engineers.’ As many members were outside London or overseas, PAGE was an important disseminator of information. From 1979 to 1982, PAGE was edited by artist Dominic Boreham, whose work was also featured in Page 42.

In 1969, CAS organised Event One, an early digital art exhibition held at the Royal College of Art (RCA) in London. In 2019, Event Two was held at the RCA to celebrate the 50th anniversary.

CAS had international input early on in its history. A Dutch Branch (CASH) was formed in 1970 in Amsterdam and CAS US, formed in 1971 was based in the Mathematics Department of Eastern Michigan University. An early issue was devoted to the American branch activities and included ‘A proposal and manifesto’ by Stan Vanderbeek, pioneer of light shows and computer animation. By 1970, the CAS membership list listed three hundred and seventy-seven members in seventeen countries, including fifteen libraries and institutional members.

During the early years of its existence, the Society acquired a large number of works by pioneers in the field, including Manuel Barbadillo, Charles Csuri, Herbert W. Franke, Edward Ihnatowicz, Ken Knowlton, Manfred Mohr, Georg Nees, Frieder Nake, Lillian Schwartz and Alan Sutcliffe. The artworks, and the archives of the Society itself, were acquired by the Victoria and Albert Museum in 2007. Works by Sutcliffe are also held by the Kunsthalle Bremen, which included them in an exhibition entitled Ex machina: early computer graphics up to 1979.

== Current status ==
The Computer Arts Society is now a Specialist Group of the British Computer Society. It holds its own meetings in London and online, and supports the EVA Conferences in London too. It is now associated with the Computer Arts Archive, founded by Dr Sean Clark in 2020 as a not-for-profit community interest company (CIC).

CAS collaborates with the Lumen Prize for digital art. It also supports the EVA Conferences held annually in central London at the BCS offices.

== Bibliography ==
- Catherine Mason, A Computer in the Art Room: The origins of British computer art 1950–1980. JJG Publishing, 2008. ISBN 978-1-899163-89-2.
- Paul Brown, Charlie Gere, Nicholas Lambert, and Catherine Mason (editors), White Heat Cold Logic: British Computer Art 1960–1980. The MIT Press, Leonardo Book Series, 2008. ISBN 978-0-262-02653-6.
