= Robotic art =

Any artwork that employs some form of robotic or automated technology

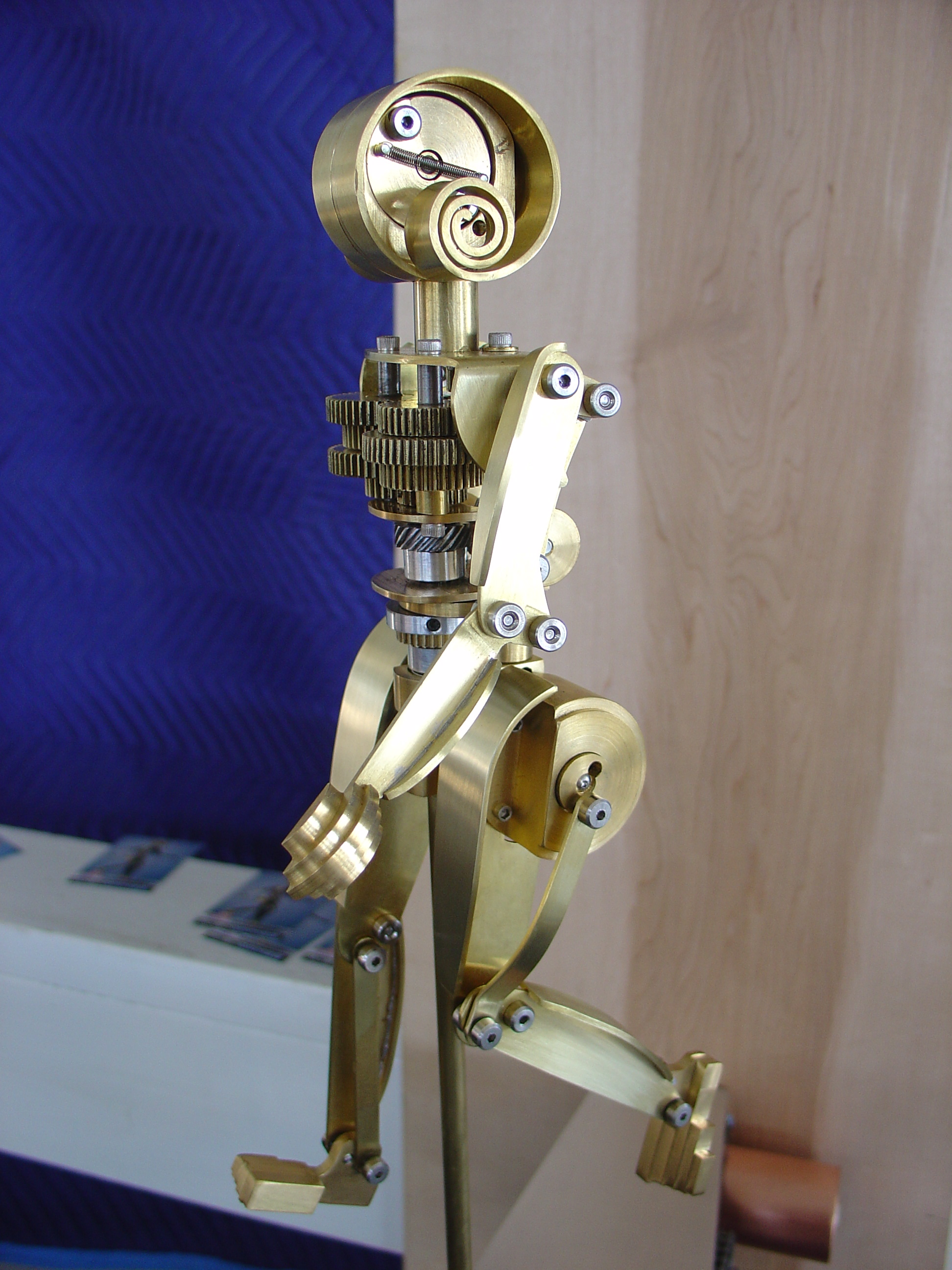
Mechanical Woman Walking by Mark Galt

Robotic art is any artwork that employs some form of robotic or automated technology. There are many branches of robotic art, one of which is robotic installation art, a type of installation art that is programmed to respond to viewer interactions, by means of computers, sensors and actuators. The future behavior of such installations can therefore be altered by input from either the artist or the participant, which differentiates these artworks from other types of kinetic art.

== History ==
Early examples of robotic art and theater existed in ancient China as far back as the Han dynasty (c. third century BC), with the development of a mechanical orchestra, and other devices such as mechanical toys. These last included flying automatons, mechanized doves and fish, angels and dragons, and automated cup-bearers, all hydraulically actuated for the amusement of emperors by engineer-craftspeople whose names have mostly been lost to history. However, Mo Ti and the artificer Yen Chin are said to have created automated chariots. By the time of the Sui dynasty (sixth century AD), a compendium was written called the Shai Shih t'u Ching, or "Book of Hydraulic Excellencies". There are reports that the Tang dynasty saw Chinese engineers building mechanical birds, otters that swallowed fish, and monks begging girls to sing.

An early innovator in the Western world was Hero of Alexandria (c. 10–70 AD), who wrote "On Automatic Theaters, On Pneumatics, and on Mechanics", and is said to have built fully automated theatrical set-pieces illustrating the labors of Hercules among other wonders.

In the thirteenth century AD, Badi Al-Zaman'Isma'il Al-Razzaz Al-Jazari was a Muslim inventor who devoted himself to mechanical engineering. Like Hero, he experimented with water clocks and other hydraulic mechanisms. Al-Jazari's life's work culminated in a book which he called The Book of Knowledge of Ingenious Mechanical Devices, completed in 1206 AD, and often known simply as Automata. In Europe, also in the thirteenth century, Villard de Honnecourt is known to have built mechanical angels for the French court, and in the fifteenth century Johannes Muller built both a working mechanical eagle and a fly.

The Prague Astronomical Clock, in Prague's Old Town Square, features four animatronic figures representing Vanity, Greed, Death, and Entertainment. The clock was built in 1410, and the first of the figures, Death, was probably added in 1490. In the 15th and 16th century, Leonardo da Vinci invented several theatrical automata, including a lion which walked onstage and delivered flowers from its breast, and a moving suit of armour.

The magician Isaac Fawkes, in 1722, created a clock that "played a variety of tunes on the organ, flute and flangolet with birds whistling and singing". He also had a mechanism called the "Temple of the Arts", which featured mechanical musicians, ships and ducks. Fawkes also created a robotic apple tree that would grow, bloom, and produce fruit before the eyes of an unsuspecting audience. This tree was the inspiration for the orange tree illusion in the film The Illusionist. In the same period, a Swiss watchmaker called Pierre Jaquet-Droz made some highly sophisticated automata, including "The Writer" (made of 6,000 pieces), "The Musician" (2,500 pieces) and "The Draughtsman" (2,000 pieces). These devices are mechanical analog computers and can still be seen in working condition at the Art and History Museum in Neuchâtel, Switzerland. Also surviving to this day is a mechanical theatre that was constructed in the gardens of Hellbrun (near Salzburg), Austria, from 1748 to 1752. Within a cross-section of an 18th-century palace, 141 hydraulically operated figures, representing people from all walks of life, can be seen going about their daily activities.

Advances in engineering created new possibilities for robotic art. In 1893, Prof. George Moore created "The Steam Man", a humanoid mechanism powered by a boiler, which he exhibited in New York City. Supported by a horizontal bar attached to a vertical post, it was capable of walking in a circle at a speed of four or five miles an hour; reportedly, it could not be held back by two men. In 1898, the engineer and inventor Nikola Tesla demonstrated a remote-controlled boat in Madison Square Garden, making use of a specially built indoor pond. This device has been identified as the world's first radio-controlled vessel. Tesla described it as having "a borrowed mind", and envisioned a fleet of fifty or a hundred submarines, or any other kind of vehicle, under the command of one or several operators.

In 1981, Warhol worked on a project with Peter Sellars and Lewis Allen that would create a traveling stage show called, Andy Warhol: A No Man Show, with a life-sized animatronic robot in the exact image of Warhol. The Andy Warhol Robot would then be able to read Warhol's diaries as a theatrical production. The play would be based on Warhol's books The Philosophy of Andy Warhol and Exposures. Warhol was quoted as saying, "I’d like to be a machine, wouldn’t you?"

== Performance art ==
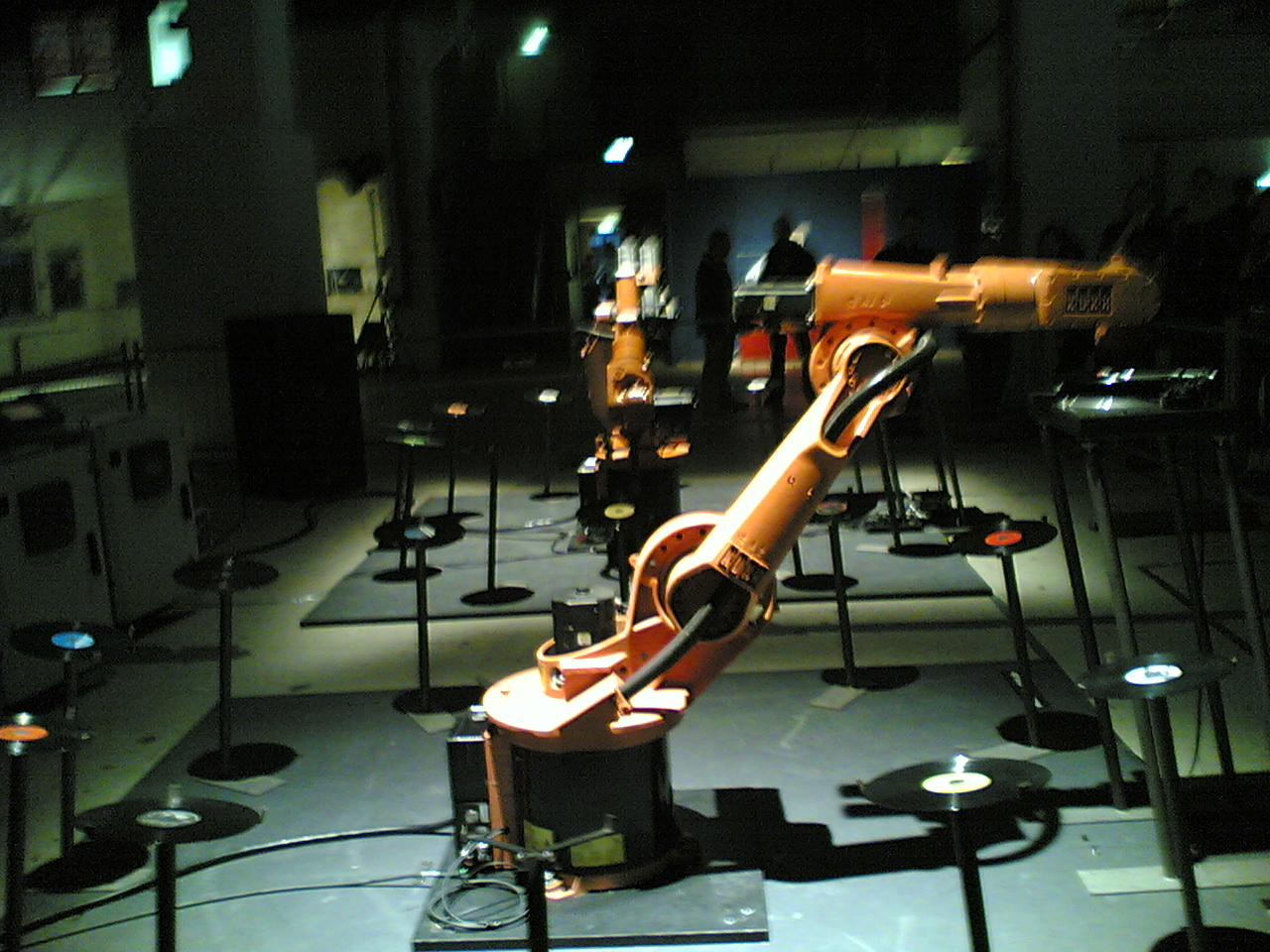
Two robot arms act as DJs in "Juke Bots", an installation created by RobotLab.

Some theatrical performances are staged in which most, if not all, of the action is executed by robots rather than by people. An early robotic artist was Edward Ihnatowicz, whose creation, the Senster, was exhibited in the Netherlands from 1970 to 1974. It employed sensors and hydraulics which reacted to the sound and movements of the people nearby. Shows of this sort are sometimes large and elaborate productions. The Swiss sculptor Jean Tinguely (1925–1991) created kinetic sculptures usually made from industrial junk. They were hallucinatory and fabulous machines which performed unpredictably until they inevitably met a tragic fate, which was often to self-destruct. His "Homage to New York", a 23-foot-high (7.0 m) and 27-foot-long (8.2 m) mechanism made of dismantled bikes and musical instruments, among other things, was displayed in 1960 in the sculpture garden of the Museum of Modern Art, New York, where it dramatically caught fire and self-destructed before a crowd of onlookers.

Pittsburgh has since the 1980s been an ongoing hub of performative robotic art-making. A steady series of robotic artists have had their origins in the Pittsburgh robotic art community or significantly developed their craft there. This includes Ken Goldberg, Ian Ingram, and Simon Penny who respectively developed "The Telegarden" (1995–2004), "On Beyond Duckling" (2004–2005), and Petit Mal (1989–2005) while in Pittsburgh. The confluence of an arts community that spans world famous institutions to bootstrapped collectives and the Carnegie Mellon University Robotics Institute underpins Pittsburgh's outsized role in robotic arts.

David Karave's robotics and fire artwork, Home Automation, is an animatronic theatre performance, with themes of propaganda and peace. This robotic artwork was created over 3 years, by more than 30 artists in the US and Canada. The project has toured across the United States, and was shown at the Tennessee Bonnaroo festival with The Art of Such N Such. In 'Home Automation' a family of lifesize aluminum animatronic crash test dummies musically self-destruct, as they watch color code threat alerts on their projected home TV. The robot family's heads finally ignite into circuit-breaking flames.

Captured! by Robots is a touring band led by Jay Vance, along with several animatronic bandmates. Vance's music-making robots were created via pneumatic actuation and 3 integrated computer systems. The ultimate goal, Vance states "is to create a live experience that blurs the line between the audience and his hard-rockin', sailor-talkin' automatons".

Human Study #4, La Classe, a theatrical art installation with twenty one drawing robots was premiered in 2017 during the Merge Festival in London and was featured on BBC and Wired. The play was telling stories of conformism, revolt, and childhood. In 2019 the artwork by Patrick Tresset was awarded an honorary mention at the Prix Ars Electronica, a smaller version with ten robots was exhibited at this occasion in Linz.

Since 2017, Marco Donnarumma has been integrating custom-built robotics driven by artificial intelligence into his performance practice, creating works that fuse body, movement, sound, and interactive technology. Working with scientific research groups such as the Neurorobotics Research Laboratory in Berlin and the Intelligent Instruments Lab in Reykjavík, he engineers body-related robotic systems, often in combination with his signature biofeedback musical instrument XTH Sense, which he uses to influence robotic behavior in real time on stage. Since 2022, his work has expanded towards the creation of ‘organs of perception’ that use robotics, biomechanics and biofeedback to explore alternate sensory experience of sound. By staging ritualized actions that foreground bodily transformation through human-robot interaction, Donnarumma’s robotic performances question the “boundaries of traditional art”, “presenting visions of a posthumanist world” that capture “the fragility of corporeal existence”. Among his most critically acclaimed robotic performances are Eingeweide (2018) and Ex Silens (2024). Due to his sustained engagement with robotics and emerging technologies in performance, Donnarumma is discussed alongside creators such as Oriza Hirata, Marcel·lí Antúnez Roca, and Stefan Kaegi, whose practices intersect robotics with contemporary theatre and performance art.

== Robotic art exhibitions ==
Since 2002, ArtBots has put on robotic art exhibitions featuring the work of robotics artists from around the world. Participants in each show are selected from responses to an open call for works; works are selected to represent a broad cross-section of the range of creative art and robotics activity.

In 2008, a citywide exhibition of ten large-scale, outdoor robotic artworks called "BigBots" was held in Pittsburgh, Pennsylvania. The exhibition included work at The Andy Warhol Museum, the Pittsburgh Center for the Arts, the Carnegie Museum of Art, and the Mattress Factory museum of installation art and pieces by Golan Levin, Grisha Coleman, Matt Barton and Jacob Ciocci, Ian Ingram, and Osman Khan. One of the pieces, "Green Roof Roller Coaster," a robotic roller-coaster for plants by Gregory Witt and Joey Hays that let the plants decide when they wanted to go for a ride, remains on the roof of the Children's Museum of Pittsburgh to this day.

An exhibition titled "Robotic Art" was held at the Cité des Sciences et de l'Industrie in Paris in 2014–2015. Monumental robotic artworks were presented, including Jean Michel Bruyère's Le Chemin de Damastès, a 50-metre (160 ft) kinetic sculpture composed by 21 computer-animated hospital-type beds, the Chico MacMurtrie's Totemobile, a full-scale Citroën DS which transforms in a few minutes to an 18-metre (59 ft) high totem, and two artworks by Shiro Takatani and Christian Partos specially conceived for the 3D Water Matrix, a robotic interface designed to create and display animated and three-dimensional liquid.

Le Grand Palais (Paris) in 2018 organised an exhibition titled ‘’Artists & Robots", curated by Laurence Bertrand Dorleac, Jerome Neutres and Miguel Chevalier. It presented works by 34 artists, covering a period from 1950 to the present and included works produced with computational systems and robotic art installations.

== Robotics artists ==
This is an alphabetically ordered list of contemporary robotics artists.

- Agnieszka Pilat
- Andy Warhol
- Annina Ruest
- Bill Vorn
- Christian Ristow
- Chico MacMurtrie
- Jeff Weber
- Eric Paulos
- Flaming Lotus Girls
- Omnicircus
- Garnet Hertz
- Genco Gulan
- Kal Spelletich & Survival Research Laboratories
- Ken Feingold
- Ken Goldberg
- Ken Rinaldo
- Leonel Moura
- Michael Candy
- Marco Donnarumma
- Mark Pauline
- Max Dean
- Nemo Gould
- Nicolas Schöffer
- Norman White
- Maywa Denki
- Pindar Van Arman
- Simon Penny
- Stelarc
- Tal Avitzur
- Theo Jansen
- Zaven Paré

== See also ==
- Robodonien
