= Miguel Chevalier =

French digital artist (born 1959)

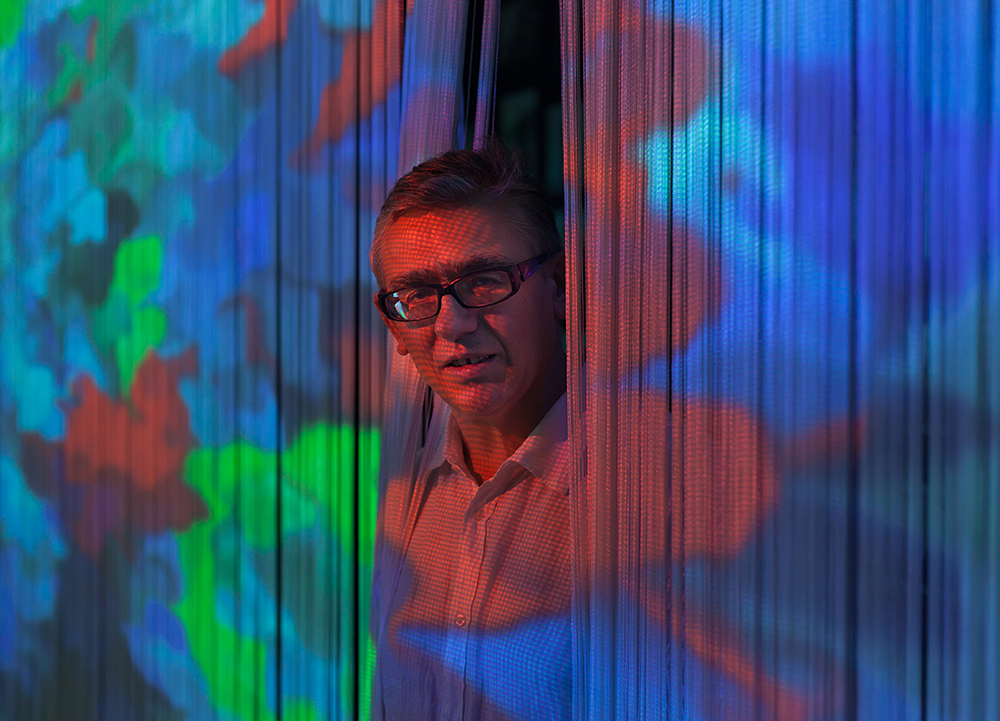
- Born: 22 April 1959 (age 67); Mexico
- Education: Université de Paris École nationale supérieure des arts décoratifs Beaux-Arts de Paris School of Visual Arts Pratt Institute
- Occupation: Artist

Miguel Chevalier (born April 22, 1959, in Mexico) is a French digital and virtual artist. Since 1978, Miguel Chevalier has used computers as a means of expression in the field of the visual arts. He has established himself internationally as one of the pioneers of virtual and digital art.

His multidisciplinary and experimental work addresses the question of immateriality in art, as well as the logics induced by computers, such as hybridization, generativity, interactivity, networking. He develops different themes in his work, such as the relationship between nature and artifice, the observation of flux and networks organizing our contemporary societies, the imaginary of architecture and virtual cities, the transposition of patterns from Islamic art into the digital world. The images he offers perpetually question our relationship to the world.

His works are most often presented in the form of digital installations projected at a large scale. He creates in-situ works that revisit the history and architecture of places through digital art, giving them a new interpretation. He also creates sculptures using 3D printing or laser cutting techniques, which materialize his virtual universes.

Miguel Chevalier has been featured in numerous exhibitions in museums, art centers and galleries all over the world. He also carries out projects in public and architectural spaces.

== Biography ==
=== Childhood and youth ===
Miguel Chevalier spent his childhood in Mexico where his father was a university researcher studying the history of Latin America. The cultural and artistic environment in which he grew up enabled the emergence of an early interest in art. Regular visitors to the family home included muralists David Alfaro Siqueiros, Rufino Tamayo or Diego Rivera, director Luis Buñuel and architect Luis Barragán, whose violent use of color would significantly influence the artist. The influence of Mexican artists is subsequently noticeable in the monumental dimension of the artist's works, as well as in the attention he pays to the integration of his art into the public space.

During his teenage years he followed his parents to Madrid, where his father took over the management of the Casa de Vélazquez. He discovers with great passion the treasures of Churrigueresque architecture, as well as the European masters' paintings in museums. At the Prado Museum, Miguel Chevalier has the opportunity to discover Goya's work, which he describes as an emotional shock. The reproduction technique as a series such as The Disasters of War impacts him deeply him, much like Andy Warhol's the silkscreened works. In 1974 he also discovered the work of the Venezuelan artist Carlos Cruz-Diez opening him to kinetic art.

He then moved to Paris, whose cultural richness and numerous exhibitions (including the one on Marcel Duchamp in 1977 and the famous Paris-New York, Paris-Moscow and Paris-Berlin at the Centre Georges Pompidou) struck him as a revelation.

=== Training ===
Miguel Chevalier joined the École Nationale Supérieure des Beaux-Arts of Paris in 1978 where he learned the basics of drawing and sculpture, where he graduated in 1981. Two years later he graduated from the École Nationale Supérieure des Arts Décoratifs as well as obtaining a license in art and archeology at the University of Paris La Sorbonne as well as in plastic art at the University of Paris Saint-Charles.

The completion of Miguel Chevalier's training also included a few stays abroad: the Pratt Institute and the School of Visual Arts in New York, thanks to the Lavoisier scholarship from the Ministry of Foreign Affairs in 1984. In the United States, the French artist finally gains access to the first computer-assisted drawing software and realizes the imminent computer revolution about to transform the artistic approach to painting, photography and video. Likewise, his stays at the Villa Kujoyama in Kyoto, Japan, from 1993 to 1994, proved to be fundamental in intensifying his relationship with nature which he had already experienced as omnipresent and luxuriant in Latin America and he encountered in the Kyoto's zen gardens like an artificial kingdom where everything is controlled in detail.

=== Career ===
While the end of the 1970s marks a return to painting through free figuration and graffiti, Miguel Chevalier seeks to generate a new pictorial subject in the field of painting. With the increased presence of computers in the media and the beginning of the Information Society at the beginning of the 1980s, Miguel Chevalier then invests the field of digital art thanks to computers which allow him to modify, animate and experiment with images endlessly. However, the access to IT tools remained difficult.

His encounter with Serge Equilbey, engineer at the CNRS optics center, gave him access to Numelec computers which analyze images by successive processing. CNRS engineers also help him write small pieces of program software, allowing him to manipulate these images. He thus created in 1982-1983 his first digital works with the series entitled “Baroque et Classic”.

The end of the 1980s and the birth of micro-computing is a turning point in Miguel Chevalier's practice by allowing him to acquire a personal computer as well as a color printer. These technological advances enabled a new freedom of creation for the artist and opened up endless possibilities.

With the appearance of the first moderately priced graphics cards, able to calculate thousands of polygons, in between the 90s and the 2000s, the artist could then create his first generative works in 3D with his virtual gardens entitled "Sur-Natures". The rapid development of new technologies starting 2005, particularly the development of increasingly powerful and accessible PC computers but also the appearance of open sourced programs and engines such as Pure Data or Unity, led Miguel Chevalier to create, with the help of computer scientists, generative and interactive virtual reality software like “Fractal Flowers”, “Liquid Pixel”, “Second nature” and “Terra incognita”. The arrival of 3D printers also allowed him to explore the materialization of the virtual with works such as "Lilus Arythmeticus said to be Euclid".

With the development of increasingly complex digital works, Miguel Chevalier surrounded himself with a team of specialists in a studio he called La Fabrika, in reference to Andy Warhol's factory. This workshop and research laboratory then allows him, with computer scientists, developers and other collaborators, to experiment with his works on a large scale.

Miguel Chevalier also works to promote the recognition of the field of digital art in the world by closely participating in large-scale exhibitions such as Artistes & Robots at the Grand Palais in 2018 (curators : Laurence Bertrand Dorléac et Jérôme Neutres) or Immaterial / Re-material: A Brief History of Computing Art at the UCCA in Beijing in 2020 (curator: Jérôme Neutres). He was also successively in charge of various teaching, especially for the City of Paris (ADAC), at the Universidad de las Andes de Bogota, at the Universidad de Mexico and at the Centro Nacional de las Artes de Mexico. He held lectures at the École Supérieure d’Art et de Design in Reims, at the École des Beaux-Arts in Rennes, at the École des Beaux-Arts in Metz and at Sciences Po Paris.

== Artistic work ==
Miguel Chevalier's work pursues a constant dialogue with the history of art, in a continuity and a metamorphosis of vocabulary, to explore and experiment with a new pictorial language.

=== Flows and networks ===
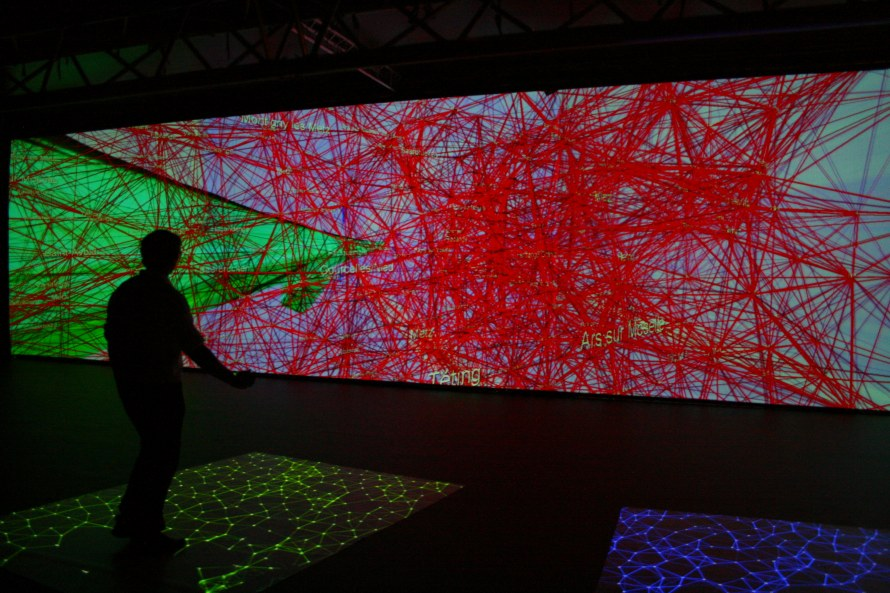
Crossborders, Miguel Chevalier, 2007. Generative and interactive virtual really artwork. Software: AAAseed by Emmanuel Mâa Berriet.

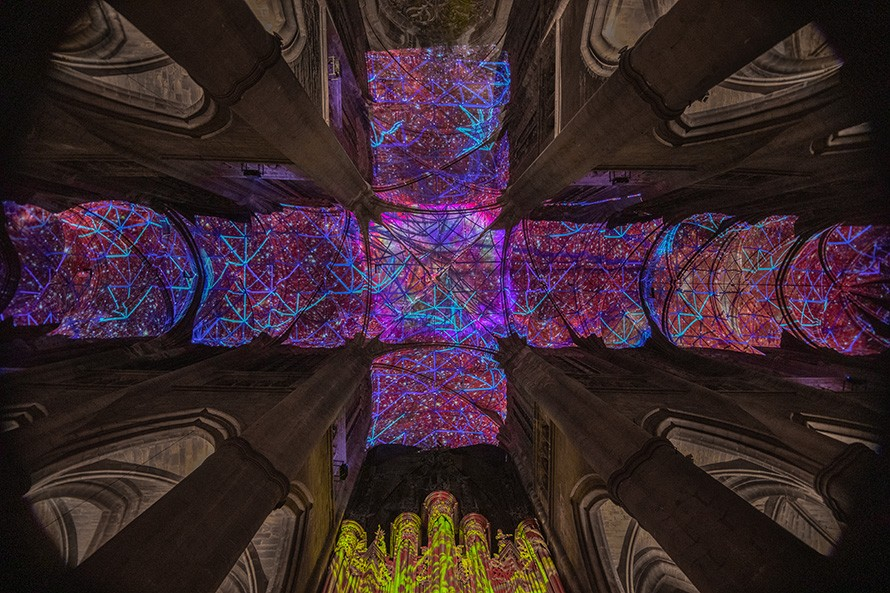
Digital Supernova, Miguel Chevalier, 2019. Virtual reality artwork. Software: Cyrille Henry / Antoine Villeret.

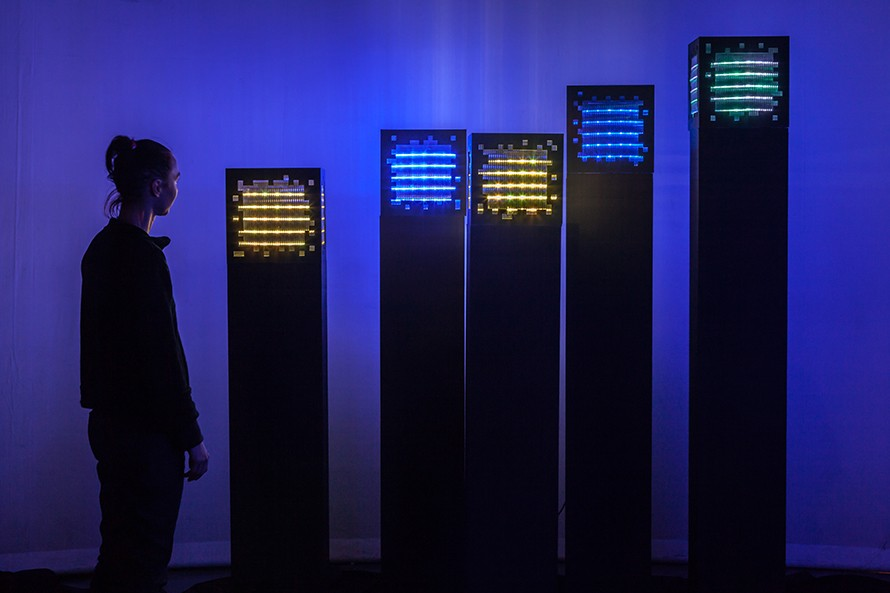
Mini Voxels Light, Miguel Chevalier, 2015. 3 virtual reality artworks, 3 x (30 x 30 x 32cm). Mike-Art-Kunst editions.

The representations of the world no longer boil down to describing the territories, but rather learning about the flows that drive continents and thus expressing the ways in which recent technologies influence the constitution of new images of the globe. Miguel Chevalier has had an early interest in the theme of networks. All the flows and networks that surround us (data flows, information flows, electricity networks, railway networks, family networks, network of relationships, etc. ) overlap and intertwine. Through his works, Miguel Chevalier studies their creation, seeks to make them visible, to materialize them and to create a link between these elements.

For the classic notions of near and far, slow and fast for the calculation of extents and distances, Miguel Chevalier substitutes those for connections, continuous or discontinuous interlacing and relations between spaces for cartographic installations, such as in Crossborders, which are now established on the invisible links, information and exchanges that roam our world.

Miguel Chevalier combines his wired virtual universes with large networks that are formed and deformed, creating infinitely renewed diverse universes, as illustrated in Digital Supernova. The elements attract, repel each other, creating a rhythm of expansion and contraction similar to breathing and blending in with the architecture in which they take place.

Visitors are invited to stroll around the cathedral, sit in the chairs and look up to the heavens. These digital pixel constellations immerse visitors in an atmosphere bathed in light and open onto infinity.

The work of Miguel Chevalier is also imprinted with the theme of pixels, in connection with the kinetic art of the 70s, pioneers of the digital world. By enlarging the pixel, as with Mini Voxels Light, the artist composes an abstract image and the viewer dives into this infinite universe of lights and shapes.

Works: Crossborders, Mini Voxels Light, Digital Supernova

=== Digital arabesques ===
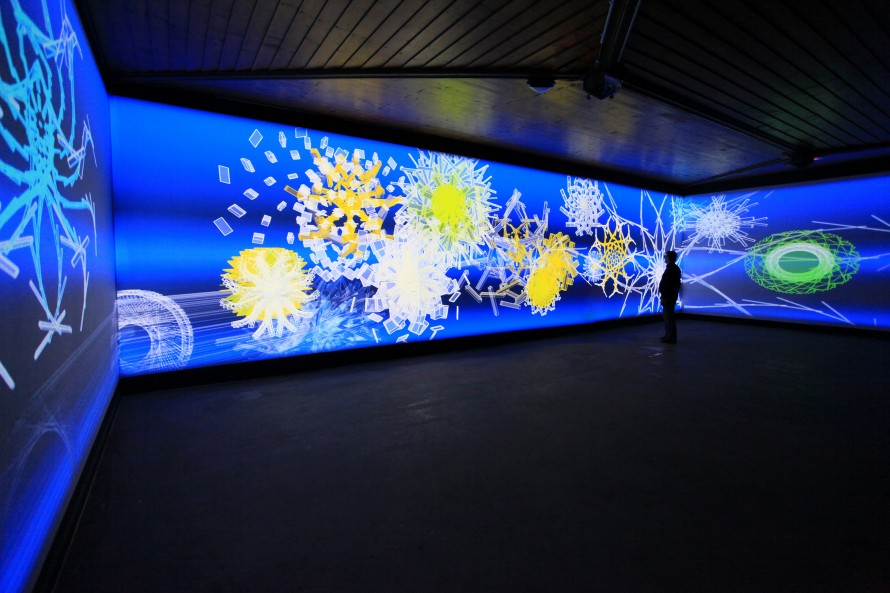
Pixels Snow, Miguel Chevalier, 2010. Generative and interactive virtual reality artwork. Software: Cyrille Henry.

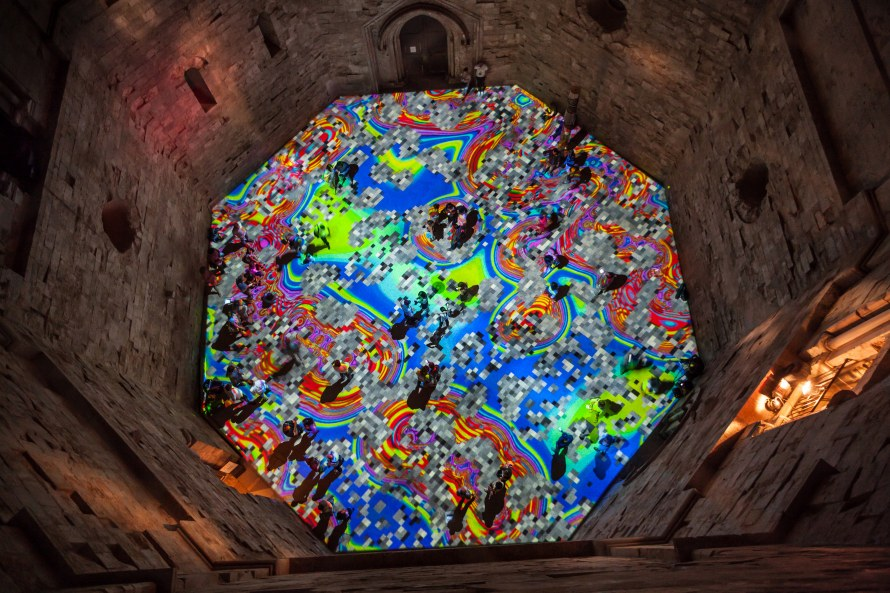
Magic Carpets, Miguel Chevalier, 2014. Generative and interactive virtual reality artwork. Software: Cyrille Henry / Antoine Villeret.

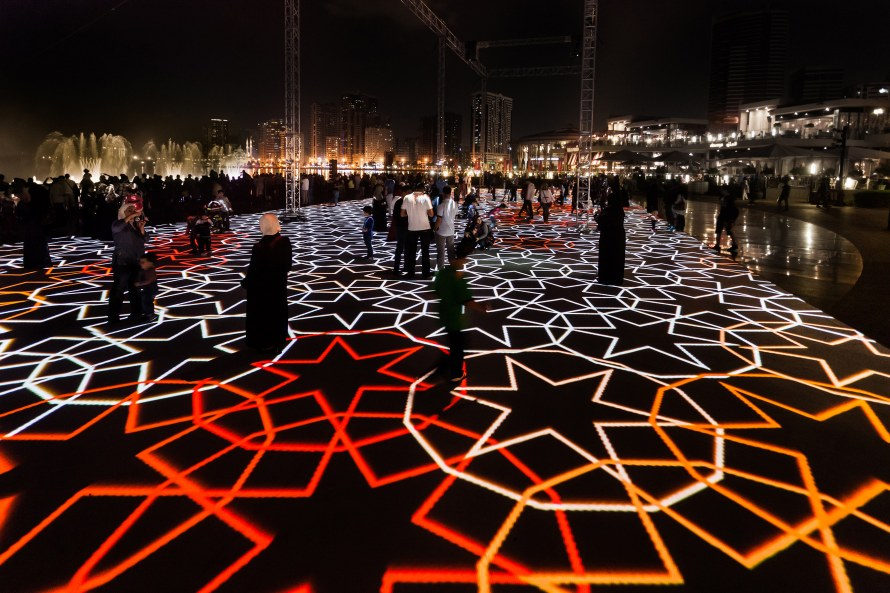
Digital Arabesques, Miguel Chevalier, 2014. Generative and interactive virtual reality artwork. Software: Cyrille Henry / Antoine Villeret.

Inspired by the tales of the Thousand and One Nights, Miguel Chevalier developed a virtual language creating a world of colors and patterns, which would transform, as through a kaleidoscope, the universe into constellations.

Starting from Islamic art, a mathematical art based on geometry, as well as mosaics, a decorative art where fragments of colored stones, enamels, or even ceramics put side by side form patterns or figures, the artist transforms the fragments into pixels to create computer-generated figures. This digital geometry, either composed of crystals, as with Pixels Snow, or of arabesques, as with Digital Arabesques, forms a world of moving shapes and colors, like a universe in creation.

In many of his works, such as Magic Carpets, Miguel Chevalier integrates interactivity using sensors that engage the body physically and its mobility in space. The viewer is encouraged to move so that the work reacts according to its movements. The relationship with the image is therefore built with the idea of movement in order to explore all its potentialities and grasp its deeper meaning. With a gesture, the visitor causes a change in the work, he elicits or modifies a color, even if he cannot foresee and control all the reactions for which he is responsible.

Virtual reality artworks, 3D printed or laser cut sculptures, robot drawings or laser paper cuts, by using digital tools and techniques, Miguel Chevalier multiplies these crystalline fractal structured shapes.

Works: Pixels Snow, Magic Carpets, Digital Arabesques

=== Nature and artifice ===
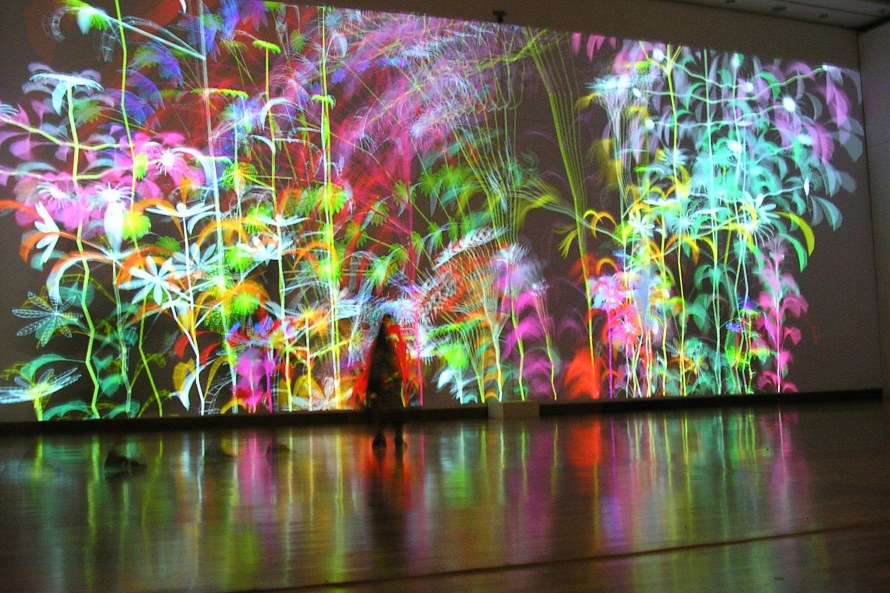
Ultra-Nature, Miguel Chevalier, 2005. Generative and interactive virtual reality artwork. Software: Music2eye.

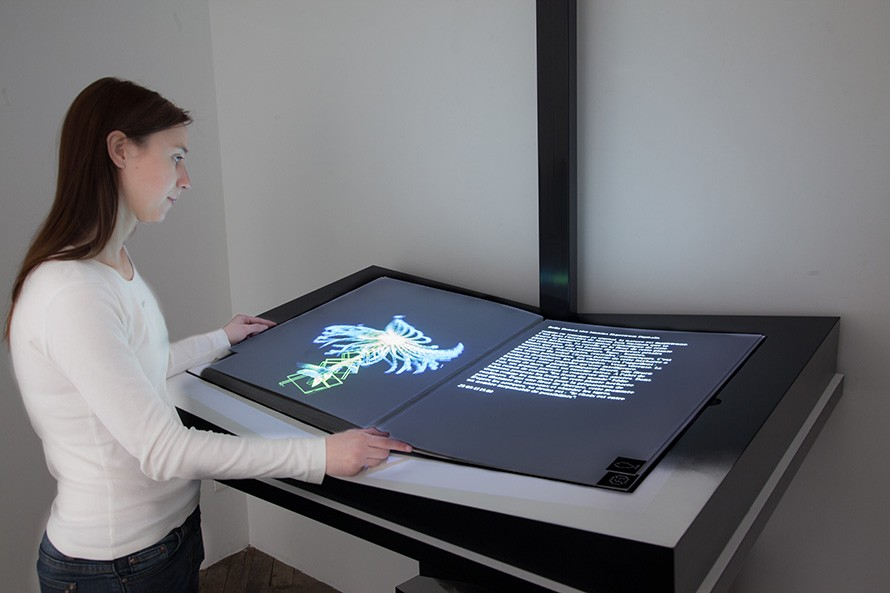
Herbarius '2059', Miguel Chevalier, 2009. Generative and interactive virtual reality artwork. Software: Cyrille Henry / Antoine Villeret. Texts: Jean-Pierre Balpe.

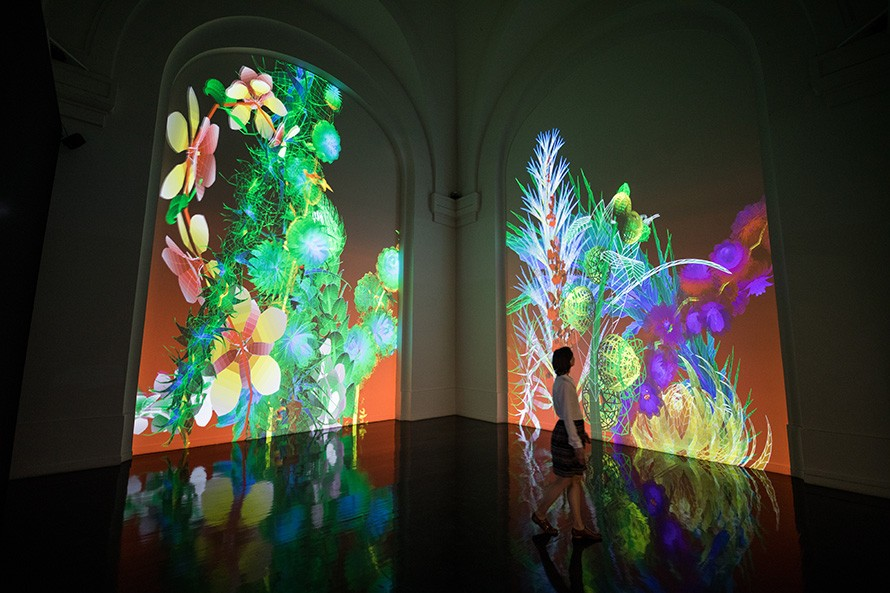
Extra-Natural, Miguel Chevalier, 2018. Generative and interactive virtual reality art work. Software: Cyrille Henry / Antoine Villeret.

Creations, such as Ultra-Nature, have their starting point the observation of the world of plants and its transposition into the digital universe. Miguel Chevalier, first inspired by his childhood spent in Mexico and his travels in Latin America where nature is omnipresent and luxuriant, but also by Japanese gardens, creates virtual gardens that explore the link between nature and artifice, which now coexist and mutually enrich each other, in a poetic and metaphorical way.

In works like Herbarius ‘2059’, the life processes of each of these creations are inspired by models developed by the French National Institute for Agronomic Research (INRA). Miguel Chevalier's virtual gardens utilize algorithms borrowed from biology, which allowed him to create universes of artificial life, effects of growth, proliferation and disappearance. Works such as Extra-Natural also have an interactive component with the use of sensors. Each of the flowers reacts to the passage of visitors according to its orientation: the plants curve from left to right, the flower corollas fall, the leaves drop and the flowers disappear in an explosion of stamens. The lightness of their dance seems to sum up the evanescence of beauty and life.

These works address themes of controlled nature, the relationship between reality and virtuality, and genetic manipulation in the digital age.

Works: Ultra-Nature, Herbarius '2059', Extra-Natural

=== Meta-territories ===
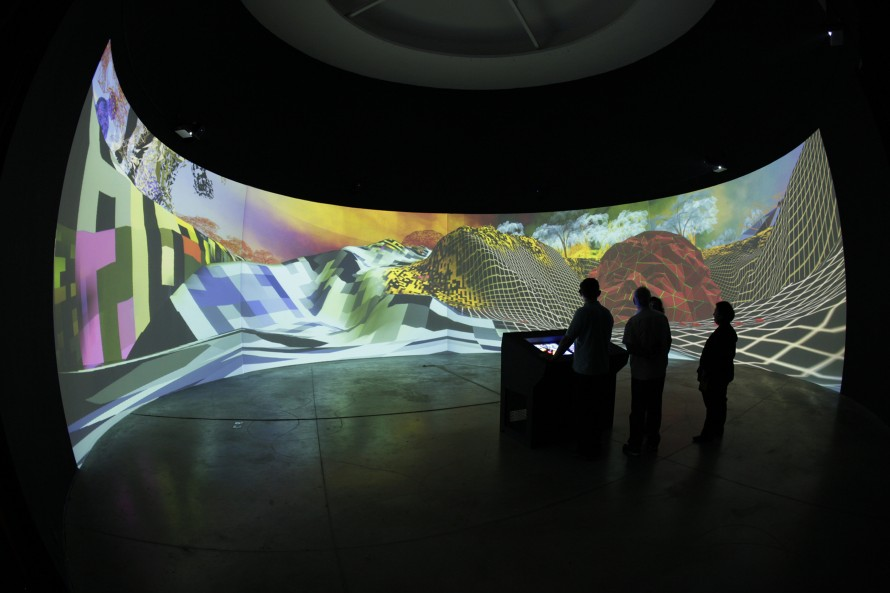
Terra Incognita, Miguel Chevalier, 2010. Generative and interactive virtual reality artwork. Music: Jacopo Baboni Schilingi. Software: Claude Micheli. 3D modeling: Pascal Maillard.

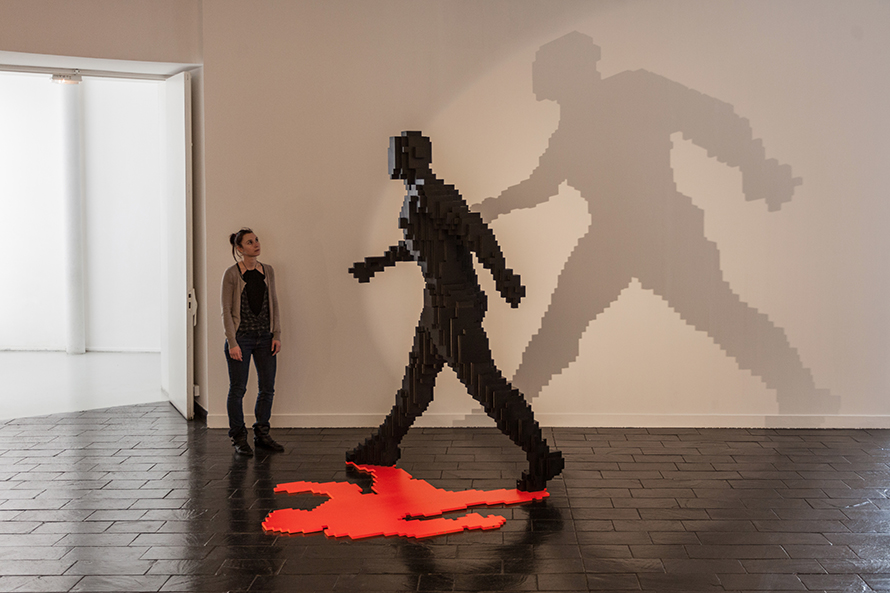
Body Voxels - The Walker, Miguel Chevalier, 2013. 2,20m tall wood sculpture painted in black and orange, steel base.

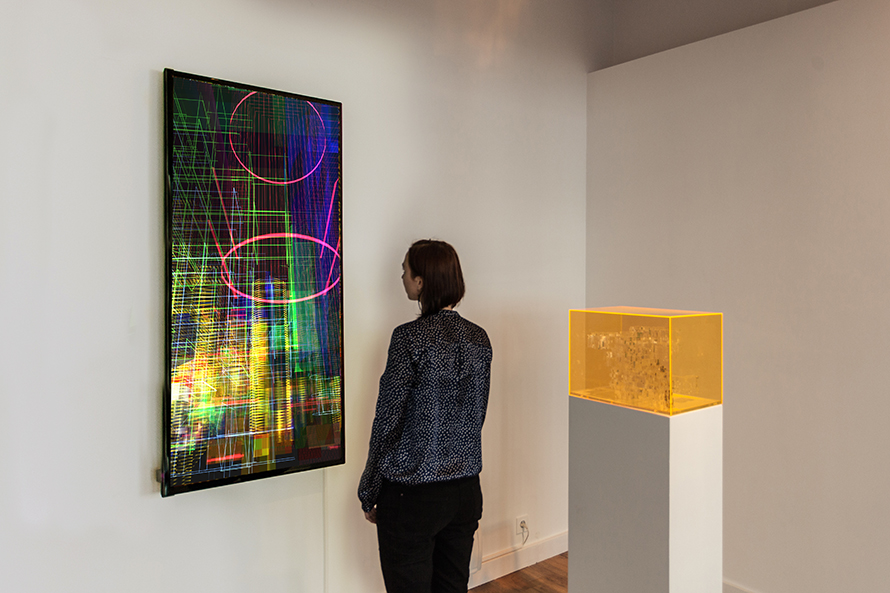
Light Meta-Cité, Miguel Chevalier, 2016. Generative virtual reality artwork. Software: Claude Micheli.

Miguel Chevalier has nourished, through his many travels in the world, a reflection on urbanity and cities which are illustrated through different mediums (digital installation, video, digital prints, sculptures...). Since the early 90s using digital technology, as in Terra Incognita, the artist has been translating the new forms of contemporary life and cities today: growth, infinite renewal, speed, transformation.

Miguel Chevalier therefore questions how to appropriate and transcribe the city faced with the multiplication of networks. Computer tools allow the artist to explore these new digital cities in their ever evolving world. Through his fixed or moving works, he composes cities between reality and simulation, inscribed in a transformable time-space continuum. He creates a different image of the city, as with Light Meta-Cité.

The artist also investigates the body as science reveals it through medical imaging (scans, MRI, ultrasound, thermography). Inspired by these new technologies which give an unprecedented vision of the human body, as illustrated in Body Voxels where mankind becomes transparent, wired, Miguel Chevalier revisits the classics of sculpture in an aesthetic linked to the digital realm (pixelation, meshing, voxelling).

Miguel Chevalier's work focuses on the future and the relationship between nature and technology.

Works: Terra Incognita, Body Voxels, Light Meta-Cité

== Grants and residencies ==
- 2004 Artist-in-residence, Riad Denise Masson, Marrakech (MAR)
- 1993–94 Artist-in-residence, Villa Kujoyama, Kyoto (JPN)
- 1991 Artist-in-residence, Casa Velazquez, Madrid (SPA) Workshop Coordinator, Museo Internacional de Electrografia, Cuenca (SPA)
- 1989 Fellowship, Musashino University, Tokyo (JPN)
- 1988 Fellowship, Institut des Hautes Etudes en Arts Plastiques de Paris – Founder: Pontus Hulten, Paris (FRA)
- 1984 Visiting artist, School of Visual Arts of New York (USA)
- 1983 Visiting artist, Pratt Institute, New York (USA)

== Solo exhibitions (selection) ==
- 2026 Digital Floralia, Foundation Vital Fundazioa, Vitoria-Gatseiz (ESP)
- 2025 Digital By Nature: The Art of Miguel Chevalier, curator: Franziska Stöhr,, Kunsthalle der Hypo-Kulturstiftung, Munich (GER)
- 2025 Digital Floralia, curator: Philippe Piguet, Musée des Beaux-Arts, Angers (FRA)
- 2025 Meta-Nature IA 4 saisons, Domaine de Chaumont sur Loire (FRA)
- 2025 Digital Abysses, Musée en herbe, Paris (FRA)
- 2024 Pixels - Une expérience interactive avec l'univers créatif de l'IA, Grand Palais Immersif, Paris (FRA)
- 2024 Navidad de Cristal, Navidad Madrid, Patio de Centro de cultura contemporánea Conde Duque, Madrid (ESP)
- 2024 Flux Marins & Digital Abysses, Château d’If, Marseille (FRA)
- 2024 Extra-Natural, Musée National, organised by the IFC, Yaoundé (CMR)
- 2024 Fractal Flowers - Transparences imaginaires - Hommage à Francis Picabia, curator : Estelle Bories, Centre d'art de Mougins (FRA)
- 2024 Digital ParadICE IA, Festival Normandie Impressionniste, curator : Philippe Piguet, Edith Ballester ice rink, Rouen (FRA)
- 2024 The Magic Dragon, ICONSIAM, Bangkok (THA)
- 2023 Magic Carpets – The Origin of the World, curators : Jérôme Sans et Pedro Alonzo, Festival Noor Riyadh, KAFD, Riyad (SAU)
- 2023 Magic Carpets, Nobel Week Lights, Stockholm City Museum, Stockholm (SWE)
- 2023 Meta-Nature AI, Seoul Light, DDP-Dongdaemun Design Plaza, Seoul (KOR)
- 2023 Kinetic Waves & Vortex, Siam Paragon, Bangkok (THA)
- 2023 Digital Cosmologies, Chapelle de la visitation - Espace d'art contemporain, Thonon-les-Bains (FRA)
- 2023 Regard Algorithmique, Galerie Pome Turbil, Thonon-les-Bains (FRA)
- 2023 Digital Beauty, Ara Art Center, Seoul (KOR)
- 2022 Digital Moirés, Ancienne tour de refroidissement du site d’Esch-Schifflange d’Arcelor Mittal, pour les Nuits de la culture et Esch-sur-Alzette, Capitale européenne de la culture, Esch-sur-Alzette (LUX)
- 2022 Bóvedas Celestes, Festival Gau Zuria, Eglise de la Encarnacion, Bilbao (ESP)
- 2022 Paradis Artificiels, Maison Elsa Triolet-Aragon, Saint-Arnoult-en-Yvelines (FRA)
- 2021 Digital Abysses, Aqua Planet, Jeju Island (KOR)
- 2021 Digital Moirés, Espace Niemeyer, Paris (FRA)
- 2021 Paradis Artificiels, Cineum, Cannes (FRA)
- 2021 Extra-Natural, Musée de Gajac, Villeneuve-sur-Lot (FRA)
- 2020 Power Pixels, Wood Street Galleries, Pittsburgh, (USA)
- 2020 Digital Cristaux 2020, Espace Art Absolument, Paris, (FRA)
- 2020 Power Pixels, Wood Street Galleries, Pittsburgh (USA)
- 2020 Digital Cristaux, Espace Art Absolument, Paris (FRA)
- 2019 Orbites 2019, Beaugrenelle Paris, Atrium Magnetic, (FRA)
- 2019 Digitale Supernova 2019, Cathédrale Notre-Dame de Rodez, (FRA)
- 2019 Pixels Noir Lumière, Musée Soulages, Rodez, (FRA)
- 2019 Machine Vision, Galerie Lélia Mordoch, Paris (FRA)
- 2018 D'un rêve à l'autre, Domaine de Trévarez, Saint-Goazec (FRA)
- 2018 Power Pixels 2018, Galerie par Graf Notaires, Paris (FRA)
- 2018 Magic Carpets Bangkok, Bangkok Illumination at Iconsiam, Bangkok (THA)
- 2018 Digital Icônes, Chapelle Saint-Nicolas, Grand festival, Verdun (FRA)
- 2018 Digital Abysses, Base sous-marine, Bordeaux (FRA)
- 2018 Ubiquity 1, The Mayor Gallery, London (UK)
- 2018 Ubiquity 2, Wilmotte Gallery, London (UK)
- 2017 Flower Power, Festival Aarhus, Bispetorv, Aarhus (DNK), Galerie Lélia Mordoch, Paris (FRA)
- 2017 In-Out/Paradis Artificiels, Domaine de Chaumont-sur-Loire (FRA) Galerie Lélia Mordoch, Paris (FRA)
- 2017 Fractal Flowers, front of the Hôtel de Ville, Ivry-sur-Seine (FRA) Galerie Lélia Mordoch, Paris (FRA)
- 2016 Power Pixels, Galerie Lélia Mordoch, Paris (FRA)
- 2016 Voûtes Célestes, Nuit Blanche, Saint-Eustache, Paris (FRA)
- 2016 Onde Pixel - Lo sguardo di... Miguel Chevalier, UniCredit Pavilion, Milan (ITA)
- 2016 Magic Carpets, IF: Milton Keynes International Festival 2016, Middleton Hall; centre:mk, Milton Keynes (UK)
- 2015 Voxels Light, Église Saint-Eustache, Paris (FRA)
- 2015 Complex Meshes, Festival Lumière, Durham Cathedral, Durham (UK)
- 2015 Dear World... Yours, Cambridge, King's College Chapel, Cambridge (UK)
- 2015 Méta-Territoires, Galerie Fernand Léger, Ivry-sur-Seine (FRA)
- 2015 Vortex, Galerie Lélia Mordoch, Paris (FRA)
- 2015 Paradis Artificiels, Domaine départemental de la Roche Jagu, Ploëzal (FRA)
- 2015 Instituts français of Morocco: Derb Lâalouj à Essaouira; Dar Benjelloun à Tétouan; Institut français garden in Agadir; Dar Batha à Fès (MAR)
- 2014 Digital Paradise, Puerta Roja Gallery, Hong Kong (CN)
- 2014 Magic Carpets, Festival Internazionale di Andria Castel dei Mondi, Castel del Monte, Andria (ITA)
- 2014 Paradis Artificiels, Musée d'art moderne, Céret (FRA)
- 2013 El Origen del mundo, Filux, Festival Internacional de las Luces México, Palacio de Bellas Artes, México (MEX)
- 2013 Power Pixels, Centre des Arts, Enghien-les-Bains (FRA)
- 2013 Fractal Flowers, Château de la Cité de Carcassonne (FRA)
- 2013 Power Pixels, Wood Street Galleries, Pittsburgh (US)
- 2012 Power Pixels, Festival a-part, Carrières de Lumières, Baux-de-Provence (FRA)
- 2012 Nuage Fractal, Château de Dravert, La Guiche (FRA)
- 2011 Pixels Snow, Forum des Halles, Paris (FRA)
- 2010 Terra Incognita, Mis, São Paulo (BRA)
- 2009 Fractal Flowers 2009, Galeria metro station, Brasilia (BRA)
- 2007 Sur-Natures, LCL building on the Champs-Élysées, Paris (FRA)
- 2006 Arabesques numériques 2006, Ksar Char Bagh Palace, Marrakech (MOR)
- 2005 Sur-Natures in vitro, Centre Pompidou, Paris (FRA)
- 2004 Ultra-Nature, metro Central Station, Astrup Fearnley Museum of Modern Art, Oslo (NOR)
- 1996 Oro negro, Museo de arte Alvar y Carmen T. de Carrillo Gil, México (MEX)
- 1992 Performances, Winter and Summer Olympic Games, Albertville (FRA) and Barcelona (SPN)
- 1987 Baroque & Classique, Granit Centre d'art contemporain, Belfort (FRA)

== Group exhibitions (selection) ==
- 2023 Fait Machine – Code sur le fil, Miam, Sète (FRA)
- 2023 Flowers Forever, Kunsthalle der Hypo-Kulturstiftung, Munich (GER)
- 2022 Herbarius (Évolution), 2022, is presented in the exhibition Les Choses. Une histoire de la nature morte at the musée du Louvre from the 12th of Octobre 2022 to the 23rd of January 2023, within the space named « Sélectionner, collectionner, classer »
- 2022 La couleur en mouvement, Galerie Wagner, Paris (FRA)
- 2022 Cinétique, La sculpture en mouvement, Espace Monte-Cristo, Paris (FRA)
- 2022 Art Basel, with The Mayor Gallery, Messe Basel, Bâle (CHE)
- 2021 Flowers in art, ARKEN Museum for Moderne Kunst, Ishøj (DNK)
- 2021 Sur les chemins du paradis, Les Franciscaines, Deauville (FRA)
- 2021 Sculpture en fête ! L’exposition des 10 ans de la collection Fondation Villa Datris, Fondation Villa Datris, L’Isle-sur-la-Sorgue (FRA)
- 2020 Immaterial/Re-material: A Brief History of Computing Art, UCCA - Ullens Center for Contemporary Art, Beijing, (China)
- 2020 Art Paris Art Fair with the Lélia Mordoch gallery, Grand Palais, Paris (FRA)
- 2020 Immaterial/Re-material: A Brief History of Computing Art, UCCA - Ullens Center for Contemporary Art, Beijing, (CHI)
- 2020 Art Paris Art Fair avec la Galerie Lélia Mordoch, Grand Palais, Paris (FRA)
- 2019 Illusion Natur, Digitale Welten, Sinclair-Haus Museum, Bad Homburg v. d. Höhe (GER)
- 2019 Mutatio, Garage Amelot, Paris (FRA)
- 2019 Desviaciones, Museo Provincial de Fotografia, Palacio Dionisi, Cordoba (ARG)
- 2019 Diálogo entre sentidos: el viaje del arte perceptivo entre América y Europa, Museo del Canal Interoceánico de Panamá (PAN)
- 2019 Arte Botanica-Regards d'artistes contemporains, Domaine de la Roche Jagu, Ploëzal (FRA)
- 2019 TEFAF Maastricht, avec The Mayor Gallery (Londres), Maastricht (NLD)
- 2019 Cinétisme, Abstraction, Figuration, Galerie Lélia Mordoch, Paris (F)
- 2019 Shadows, Galerie italienne, Paris (FRA)
- 2018 Art in Motion. 100 Masterpieces With and Through Media, ZKM, Center for art, technologies and medias, Karlsruhe, (GER)
- 2018 Artistes & Robots, Grand Palais, Paris (FRA)
- 2018 Al Musica, Philharmonie, Paris (FRA)
- 2018 TEFAF Maastricht, The Mayor Gallery (London), Maastricht (NLD)
- 2018 De Calder à Koons, bijoux d’artistes. La collection idéale de Diane Venet, Musée des Arts décoratifs de Paris (FRA)
- 2018 Art Paris Art Fair, avec la Galerie Mordoch (Paris/Miami), Grand Palais, Paris (FRA)
- 2017 Artists & Robots, Contemporary Art Center, Astana (KAZ)
- 2017 Hortus 2.0, Musée Louis Vouland, Avignon (FRA)
- 2017 De Nature en Sculpture, Fondation Villa Datris, L’Isle-sur-la-Sorgue (FRA)
- 2017 Data City, Centre des arts, Enghien-les-Bains (FRA)
- 2017 Gainsbourg still alive, Maison de vente aux enchères Cornette de Saint Cyr, Paris (FRA)
- 2016 Sculpture en partage, Fondation Villa Datris, L’Isle-sur-la-Sorgue (FRA)
- 2016 Scope Miami Beach, Galerie Lélia Mordoch, Miami (USA)
- 2016 Intangible Space - Miguel Chevalier et Laurent Martin "Lo", Puerta Roja Gallery, Hongkong, (HKG)
- 2016 Les Lumières de la Ville, Galerie Lélia Mordoch, Paris (FRA)
- 2015 ARCHI-SCULPTURE, Fondation Villa Datris, L’Isle-sur-la-Sorgue (FRA)
- 2015 2050 - Une brève histoire de l'avenir, Musées Royaux des Beaux-Arts de Belgique, Bruxelles (BEL)
- 2015 Bonjour la France, Seongnam Arts Center, Seongnam (KOR)
- 2014 Digital Arabesques, Al Majaz waterfront, Islamic Art Festival, Sharjah (E.A.U)
- 2014 Metamorphosis of the Virtual, K11 Art Foundation, Shanghai (CHN)
- 2014 L'Origine du Monde, façade du Grand Palais, Art Paris Art Fair, Paris (FRA). Courtesy Louise Alexander Gallery
- 2013 Les Métamorphoses du Virtuel, 100 ans d’art et de liberté, Officina delle Zattere, Venise (ITA)
- 2013 Retrospective Auguste Herbin, Musée d'art moderne, Céret (FRA)
- 2013 Turbulences II, Fondation Boghossian – Villa Empain, Bruxelles (BEL)
- 2012 Retrospective Auguste Herbin, Musée départemental Matisse, Le Cateau Cambrésis (FRA)
- 2012 Mouvement et lumière, Villa Datris, L'Isle-sur-la-Sorgue (FRA)
- 2012 Turbulences, Espace culturel Louis Vuitton, Paris (FRA)
- 2012 Picasso to Koons: Artist as Jeweler (cat.), Benaki Museum, Athènes (GRC)
- 2011 Festival La Novela, Musée des Abattoirs, Toulouse (FRA)
- 2010 Manimal, Herzliya Contemporary Art Museum, Herzliya (IL)
- 2009 Inside, art and science, Cordoaria, Lisbonne (POR)
- 2009 Dialogue avec les collections #2 - paysage/vidéo, Musée d'Art de Toulon (FRA)
- 2008 Ultra-Natures, Emoção Art.ficial 4.0, Station de Métro Paraiso, Centro Cultural Itaú, São Paulo (BRA)
- 2007 Ultra-Nature, Glow Festival : forum of light in art and architecture, Eindhoven (NLD)
- 2006 Art and playing, Funsters, Seoul Arts Center, Séoul (KOR)
- 2005 Digital Paradise, Daejeon Museum of Art Gallery, Daejeon (KOR)
- 2003 Space Art, Festival Art Outsiders, Maison Européenne de la Photographie, Paris (FRA)
- 2000 Kwangju International Biennale (KOR)
- 1999 Virtuel Réel, Espace Paul Ricard, Paris (FRA)
- 1997 Magie der Zahl, Staatsgalerie, Stuttgart (GER)
- 1996 La Ville moderne en Europe, Museum of contemporary art of Tokyo (JPN)
- 1996 La Ville, Centre Georges Pompidou, Paris (FRA)
- 1993 Excess in the techno-mediacratic society, Shoshana Wayne Gallery, Santa Monica (États-Unis)
- 1992 Variaciones en Gris, Centro Cultural de la Villa, Madrid (SPA)
- 1990 Art & publicité 1890–1990, Centre Georges Pompidou, Paris (FRA)
- 1988 Ateliers 88, ARC, Musée d’art moderne de Paris (FRA)

== Public procurements ==
- 2017 Pixels Wave Light, Forum des Halles, Paris (FRA)
- 2015 Les Métamorphoses, Les Fauvettes Cinéma, Paris (FRA), Architect: Françoise Raynaud/Loci Anima
- 2012 Pixels Crossing, Forum des Halles, Paris (FRA)
- 2011 Pixels Op'Art, front of a building, Colmar (FRA)
- 2010 Seconde Nature, place d'Arvieux, Marseille (FRA), avec Charles Bové
- 2008 Fractal Flowers, Bank of Cheonggyecheon River, Séoul (KOR)
- 2007 Pixels Crossing, Hôpital Trousseau, Paris (FRA), Architectes: Agence Grimaud & Israël
- 2006 Mosaïque Unicef, Hall of the Head Office of the UNICEF, NYC (USA)
- 2000 Living Networks, Palais de Congrès, Paris (FRA), Architecte: Christian de Portzamparc

== Miguel Chevalier's work in Museum collections ==
- Musée d'Art moderne de la ville de Paris, Paris (FRA)
- Bibliothèque nationale, Paris (FRA)
- Musée de la Chasse et de la Nature, Paris (FRA)
- Mobilier National, Paris (FRA)
- Institut Pasteur, Paris (FRA)
- Fonds national d'art contemporain, Puteaux (FRA)
- Musée d’art et d’histoire, Belfort (FRA)
- MAC/VAL, musée d'art contemporain du Val-de-Marne, Vitry-sur-Seine (FRA)
- Museo internacional de electrografia, Cuenca (ESP)
- Museo de arte Alvar y Carmen T. de Carrillo Gil, Mexico (MEX)
- Museo de artes visuales Alejandro Otero, Caracas (VEN)
- Museo de bellas artes, Maracaibo (VEN)
- Royal Caribbean Cruce line, Miami (US)
- Centre Culturel Itau, São Paulo (BRA)
- Musée de la poste, Paris (FRA)
- Digital Art International (FRA)
- Fondation Clément, Martinique (MTQ)

== Bibliography ==
- Miguel Chevalier, Bernard Chauveau Édition, Paris, 2018 (ISBN 978-2-36306-243-7)
- Miguel Chevalier, 1-Bit Book: l'imaginaire des mondes virtuels 2012–2015, Galerie Lélia Mordoch, Paris/Miami, 2015 (ISBN 978-2-909138-24-4)
- Serge Fauchereau et David Rosenberg, Power Pixels, Enghien-les-Bains, Centre des arts, 2013 (ISBN 978-2-916639-32-1)
- Miguel Chevalier, L’Algorithme pixelisé, collection "L'art en écrit", éditions Jannink, Paris, 2003 (ISBN 2-902462-84-0)
- Serge Fauchereau et Vincent Huguet, Power Pixels, Rio de Janeiro, Aeroplano editora, 2011
- Christine Buci-Glucksmann, Seconde Nature/Marseille 2010, Miguel Chevalier et Charles Bové, Paris, a.p.r.e.s. éditions, 2011 (ISBN 978-2-9528897-5-9)
- Miguel Matos, Power Pixels, Lisboa, Antonio Prates, 2010
- Suzete Venturelli, Segunda Natureza, Brasilia, Espaço Marcantônio Vilaça, 2009
- Jean-Pierre Balpe et Miguel Chevalier, Herbarius 2059 - 12 graines, Paris, 2009 (ISBN 978-2-84940-059-3)
- Cemren Altan et Pierre Yves Desaive, Fractal Flowers 2009, Bruxelles, iMal, 2009
- Mario Costa, Edmond Couchot, Gunnar B. Kvaran, Ariella Masboungi et Mohamed Rachdi, Miguel Chevalier, 2000/2008, Blou, Monografik Editions, 2008 (ISBN 978-2-916545-76-9)
- Henri-François Debailleux, Seconde nature, Trelazé, Ed. Mairie de Trelazé, 2007
- Manuela de Barros, Arabesques Numériques, Marrakech, Ed. Institut Français de Marrakech, 2005
- Françoise Gaillard, Paradis artificiels, Vitry sur Seine, Ed. Galerie Municipale de Vitry-sur-Seine, 2004
- Norbert Hillaire, Autres Natures, Montreuil, Ed. Centre d’Art Modene Espace Mira Phalaina, 2001
- Pierre Restany, Laurence Bertrand-Dorléac et Patrick Imbard, Miguel Chevalier 1981/2000, Paris, Flammarion, 2001
- Christine Buci-Glucksmann et Miguel Chevalier, CD-Rom intéractive, Paris, 2000
- Gerardo Estrada, Jorge Juanes et Elias Levin Rojo, Oro negro, Mexico, Ed. Museo de arte Alvar y Carmen T. de Carrillo Gil, 1996
- José Hernan Aguilar et Miguel Chevalier, Oro negro, Bogotà, Ed. Museo de arte universidad nacional de Colombia, 1994
- Jorge Luis Gutiérrez, Oro negro, Caracas, Ed. Museo de artes visuales Alejandro Otero, 1993
- Rosanna Albertini, De l’analogique au numérique, Belfort, Ed. Musée d’art et d’histoire, 1992
- Miguel Chevalier, Marine, Nantes, Ed. École régionale des beaux-arts, 1991
- Eric Audinet et Ginger Danto, Œnologie, Paris, Ed. Horizons chimériques, 1991
- Patrick Imbard et Alain Renaud, Miguel Chevalier. Interconnexion, Levallois-Perret, Ed. Centre d’art contemporain La Base, 1990
- Vittorio Fagone, Anthropométrie, Firenze, Ed. Galleria Vivita 2, 1990
- Miguel Chevalier, Mosaïques, Brétigny-sur-Orge, Ed. Centre d’art contemporain, 1989
- Pierre Restany et Laurence Bertrand Dorléac, Révolution. De la peinture au numérique, Hérouville-Saint-Clair, Ed. Centre d’art contemporain, 1989
- Jérôme Sans, Miguel Chevalier, Images nouvelles, Belfort, Ed. Granit Centre d’art contemporain, 1987
