= Dorléac =

Dorléac is a surname. Notable people with the surname include:

- Catherine Dorléac (born 1943), French actress, known as Catherine Deneuve
- Françoise Dorléac (1942–1967), French actress
- Jean-Pierre Dorleac, stage name of American costume designer Jerome Paine.
- Laurence Bertrand Dorléac (born 1957), French art historian
- Maurice Dorléac (1901–1979), French actor, father of Catherine and Françoise
