= Senster =

Robotic sculpture by Edward Ihnatowicz

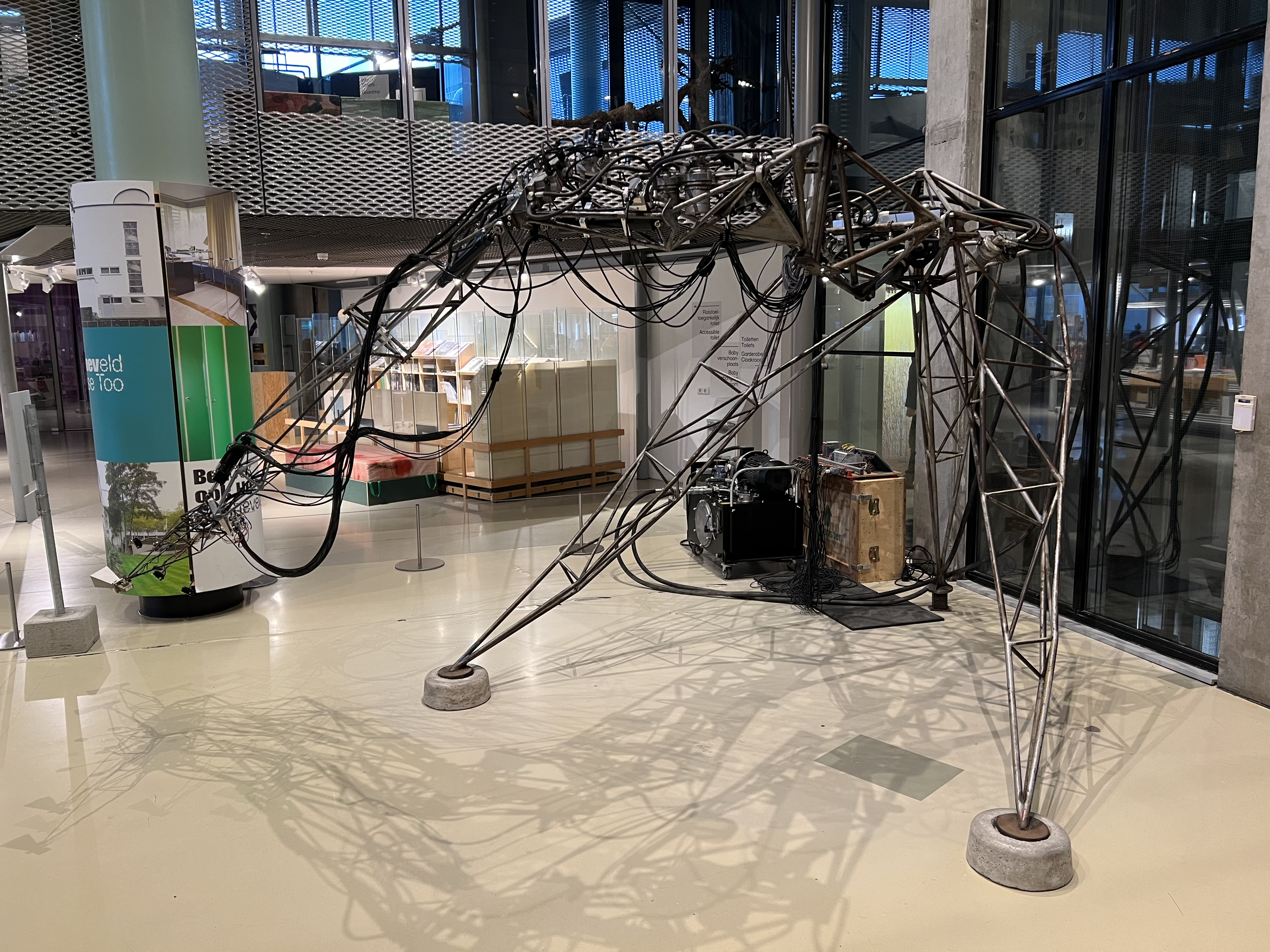
- Artist: Edward Ihnatowicz
- Year: 1970
- Medium: computer, steel, Doppler radar
- Location: Evoluon
- Commissioned by: Philips

The Senster is a work of robotic art created by Edward Ihnatowicz. It was commissioned by Philips to be exhibited in the Evoluon, in Eindhoven, the Netherlands and was on display from 1970 to 1974 there, when it was dismantled. The work was restored in the late 2010s.

It is considered to be the first work of robotic sculpture to be controlled by a digital computer. The work measures about 8 feet (2.5m) high "at the shoulder" and about 15 feet (4 m) long, constructed of welded steel tubing and actuated by hydraulic rams. The work's metal structure resembles an animal, standing on three legs, and featuring a long neck, like a giraffe. When the work was created and installed in the 1970s, there were four microphones and two Doppler radar sensors mounted on its "head", which were used to sense the sound and movement of the people around it. A computer system (Philips P9201 - a clone of the more common Honeywell 416) controlled the robot and implemented a behavioural system so that the Senster was attracted to sound and low level movement, but repelled by loud sounds and violent movements. The complicated acoustics of the Evoluon main hall and the completely unpredictable behaviour of the public made the Senster's movements seem a lot more sophisticated than the software would suggest.

The reconstructed Senster interacting with an audience at Nieuwe Instituut, Rotterdam, March 2023

After it was decommissioned, the steel structure was on display in the open air, outside the firm that originally had built it, in Colijnsplaat (the Netherlands). In 2017 the frame was purchased by the AGH University of Science and Technology in Krakow. After a lengthy restoration the Senster was reactivated as part of the 100th inauguration of the Academic Year and it became part of the collection of that same university.

Due to its importance to the development of digital art in the Netherlands, the Senster has been listed in the Digital Canon of the Netherlands (1960-2000) and was shown during the 2023-2024 digital art retrospective exhibition REBOOT at Nieuwe Instituut in Rotterdam.
