= Leonel Moura =

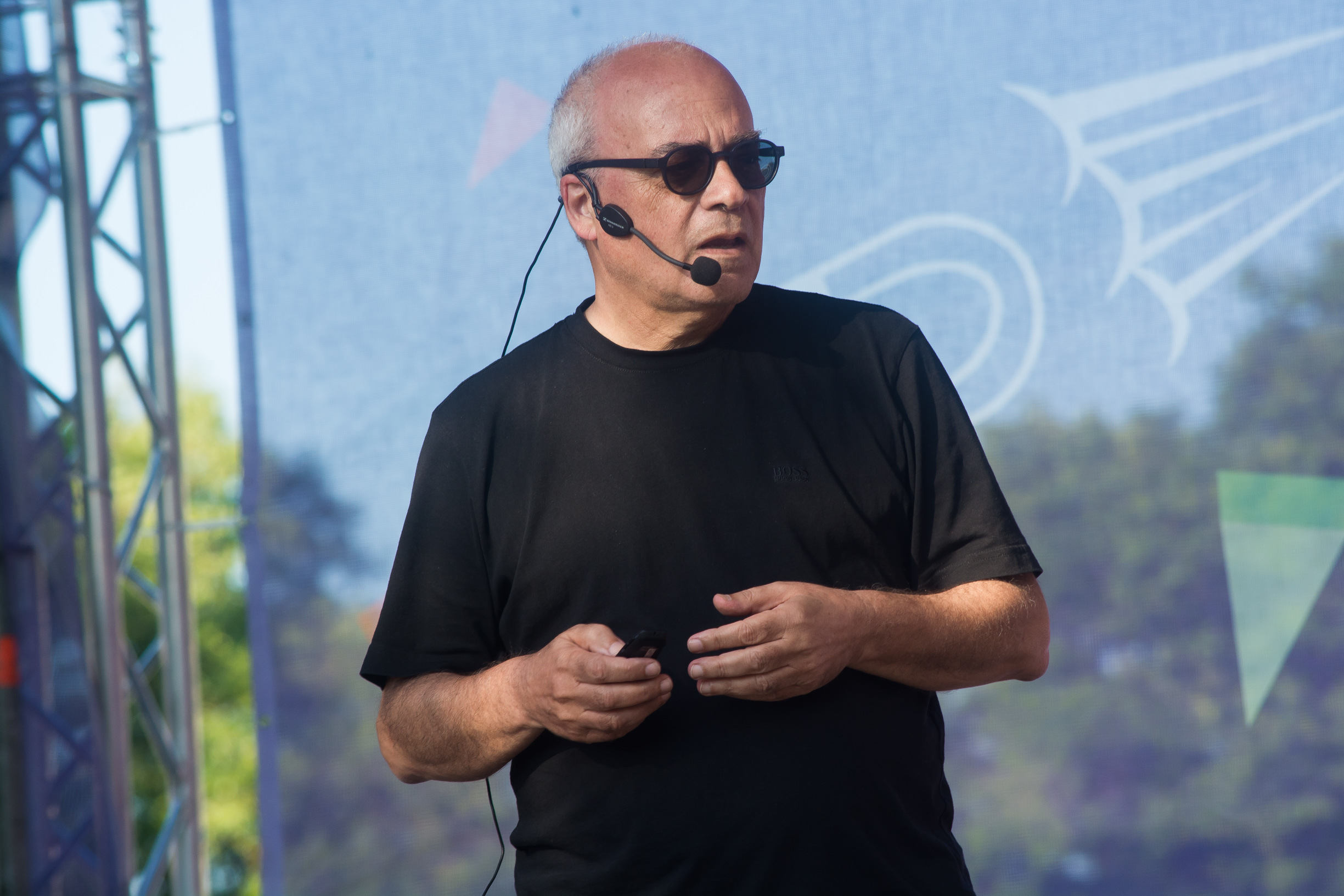
Leonel Moura at Geek Picnic (2016)

Leonel Moura (born December 26, 1948, in Lisbon, Portugal) is a conceptual artist whose work shifted in the late 1990s from photo based work to Artificial Intelligence and Robotic art. Since then he has produced several Painting Robots and the Robotarium, a zoo for robots. RAP (Robotic Action Painter) (2006) is a robot that makes drawings based on emergence and stigmergy, decides when the work is ready, and signs it, is displayed as a permanent installation at the American Museum of Natural History in New York.

== Robots ==
ArtSbot (Art Swarm Robots), 2003, comprise several small autonomous robots, called Mbots, each equipped with color detection sensors, obstacle avoidance sensors, a microcontroller and actuators, for locomotion and pen manipulation. Mbots have two distinct behaviors: the random behavior that initializes the process by activating a pen, based on a small probability (usually 2/256), whenever the color sensors read white; and the positive feed-back behavior that reinforces the color detected by the sensors, activating the corresponding pen (since there are two pens, the color circle is split into two ranges - 'warm' and 'cold'). With this process the collective set of robots generate compositions where from a random background some color clusters emerge.

RAP (Robotic Action Painter), 2006, work alone but based on the same principles of emergence and stigmergy. Some improvements however produce rather distinct compositions from those of the ArtSbot swarm. Some of the new skills are: to determine the length and shape of each trace, the capacity to decide, in a non-linear mode, the moment to stop and the ability to sign. Additionally RAP works with six color pens and the RGB sensors are disposed in a grid of 3x3 which permits to detect local patterns and not only colors.

ISU, 2006, is very similar to RAP but is able to write letters and build words. In this fashion it makes compositions that resemble some of the Lettrist works from the 1950s and automatism.
Robotarium X is a large-scale steel glass construction lodging forty-five different robots, most powered by photovoltaic energy and fully autonomous.

RUR, the birth of the robot

In 2010 Leonel Moura creates a new version of the theatre play RUR with robots.
R.U.R., Rossum’s Universal Robots is a classic playwright written by Karel Capek in the 1920s in which the word ROBOT was coined. Men and robots clash resulting in the extermination of mankind and the emergence of robots as a new dominant species. The play was always staged with human actor’s transvestite as robots. Moura’s new version displays, for the first time, real robots interacting on stage with human actors.
RUR, the birth of the robot, debuted in August 2010 at the Itáu Cultural, São Paulo, Brazil. During the 2017 edition of The New Art Fest (Lisbon) the artist installed BeBot, a swarm of robot-painters demonstrating the idea of future autonomous art.

== Books ==
Moura, Leonel et al. (2009) INSIDE [art and science], Lisbon, LxXL edition
Moura, Leonel (2009) Robot Poetry, Coimbra, Water Museum edition
Moura, Leonel (2009) RAP (Robotic Action Painter), Tavira, Tavira Museum Edition
Moura, Leonel (2007) Robotarium, Lisbon, LxXL edition
Moura, Leonel et al. (2005) Bioart - A new Kind of Art, Lisbon, Edition: Prates Gallery
Moura, Leonel and Pereira, Henrique Garcia (2004) Man + Robots: Symbiotic Art, Villeurbanne, Institut d'Art Contemporain, Lyon/Villeurbanne
Moura, Leonel (2003) Formigas, Vagabundos e Anarquia (Portuguese), Lisbon, Edition: AAAL, Out-of-print
Moura, Leonel et al. (2002) Architopia, Cascais. Utopia Biennial
Moura, Leonel (1995) Impossibilité (French), Villeurbanne, Edition: Institut d'Art Contemporain, Lyon/Villeurbanne
