= Robert Mallary =

American artist (1917–1997)

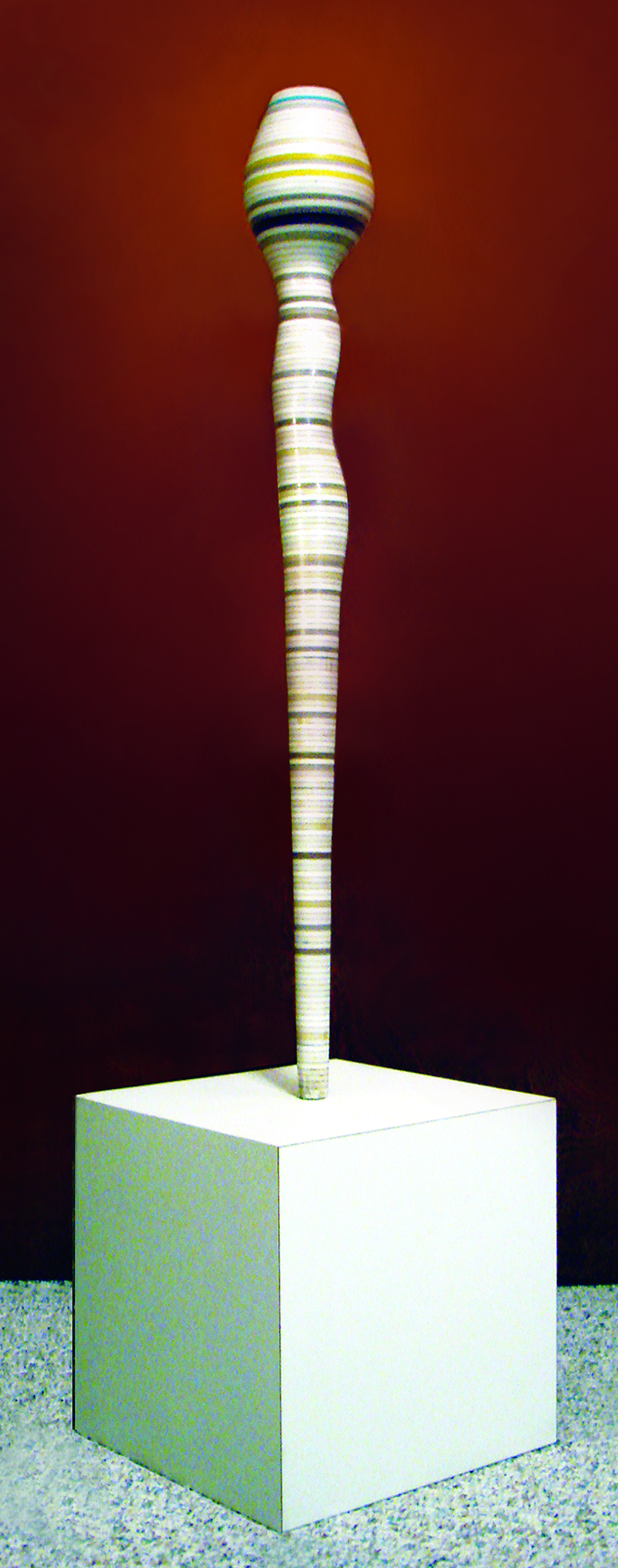
Quad 1, computer-generated sculpture by Robert Mallary (1968).

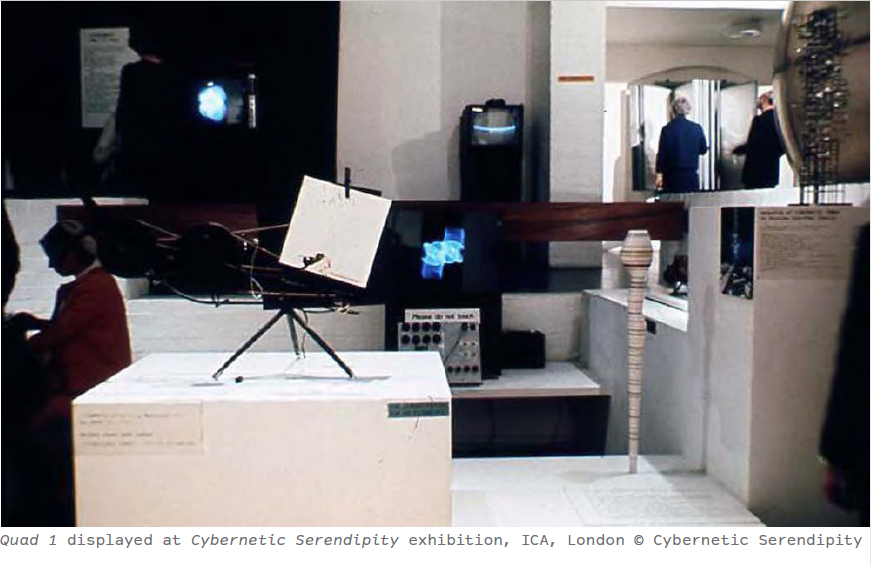
Quad 1 displayed at the Cybernetic Serendipity exhibit at the Institute for Contemporary Arts (ICA) in London (1968). © Cybernetic Serendipity

Robert W. Mallary (December 2, 1917 – February 10, 1997) was an American abstract expressionist sculptor and pioneer in computer art. In the 1950s and 1960s, he was renowned for his Neo-Dada or "junk art" sculpture, created from found materials and urban detritus, pieced together with hardened liquid plastics and resins. Mallary's work is represented in permanent collections such as the Museum of Modern Art, the Whitney Museum of American Art, the National Gallery of Art in Washington, D.C., as well as the Victoria and Albert Museum and the Tate Modern in London.

In 1968, Mallary created one of the world's first (perhaps the first) digitally modeled sculptures, Quad 1. This work was shown at the landmark Cybernetic Serendipity exhibit at the Institute of Contemporary Arts (ICA) in London. A subsequent work, Quad 3, was displayed at the Whitney Museum's 1968 Annual Exhibition of Contemporary American Sculpture.

== Biography ==
Mallary was born in Toledo, Ohio, and grew up in Berkeley, California. He was interested in art from his youth, and went to Mexico City to study at the Escuela de Las Artes Del Libro (now the Escuela Nacional de Artes Gráficas) in 1938–39, and then at the Academy of San Carlos in 1942–43, where he was inspired by José Clemente Orozco and David Alfaro Siqueiros. He also studied at the Painter's Workshop School in Boston, Massachusetts in 1941.

While continuing to pursue his fine arts career, Mallary worked as an advertising Art Director in Los Angeles from 1945 to 1948, and as a commercial artist until 1954. His paintings (made with liquid polyester) were shown at the Urban Gallery in New York City in 1954, where he had four other exhibits until 1959. His work was also shown at Gump's Gallery in San Francisco (1953) and the Santa Fe Museum in Arizona (1958).

Mallary taught at the California School of Art in Los Angeles in 1949–50, at the Hollywood Art Center from 1950 to 1954, and then became Professor of Art at the University of New Mexico in Albuquerque from 1955 to 1959. When he moved to New York City in 1959 to teach at Pratt Institute in Brooklyn, Mallary was part of the burgeoning New York art scene, along with his friends Willem and Elaine de Kooning, Wayne Thiebaud, Joan Mitchell and Helen Frankenthaler. (In the 1940s, Thiebaud and Mallary had been art directors at the Rexall Corporation in Los Angeles.) In 1967, Mallary became Professor of Art at the University of Massachusetts in Amherst, where he taught until his retirement in 1996. He was also a guest teacher at Pennsylvania State University (1962), University of Minnesota (1965), and the University of California at Davis (1963, 1967).

Mallary's abstract relief sculptures and assemblages, created from discarded cardboard, fabrics, sand and straw – held together with hardened polyester resin – were featured in Life Magazine (Nov. 24, 1961). Already known for technological innovation in art even before he became a computer artist in the late 1960s, Mallary's Luminous Mobile sculptures had been featured in Time magazine (March 10, 1952).

Mallary's monumental "Cliffhangers" sculpture was exhibited outside the New York State Pavilion at the 1964 World's Fair in Flushing, NY. His work was featured in the "Sculpture U.S.A and "Sixteen Americans" exhibits at the Museum of Modern Art in New York City in 1959, and then at its "Art of Assemblage" exhibition in 1961. Mallary was awarded a Guggenheim Fellowship in 1964.

The Allan Stone Gallery in New York City had four exhibits of Robert Mallary's work between 1961 and 1966. Mallary's sculpture, Pythia was purchased for The Governor Nelson A. Rockefeller Empire State Plaza Art Collection in Albany, NY in 1966. The State University of New York in Potsdam had a Robert Mallary Retrospective exhibit in 1968.

In 1993, Mallary's work was displayed at the Mitchell Algus Gallery in NYC in the exhibit, "Robert Mallary: Early Assemblage and Recent Computer Graphics His sculptures, assemblages, computer graphics, and stereoscopic 3D projection art were shown at the Herter Gallery at UMass in 1990, and at the Springfield Museum of Fine Art in Massachusetts in 1995. The Mayor Gallery in London presented the exhibit, "Robert Mallary: The New Mexico Reliefs 1957-58" at Frieze New York in May, 2017. Mitchell Algus displayed Mallary's earlier sculptures and drawings in his 2017 gallery exhibit, "Robert Mallary: The Human Condition (Work from 1936-1965)

The Mayor Gallery in London has exhibited Mallary's computer art, as well as the sculptures and assemblages created earlier in his career. In 2018, The Mayor Gallery displayed Mallary's computer-generated sculpture, Quad 3, along with his computer drawings in the exhibition, "Writing New Codes: 3 Pioneers in Computer Art 1969-1977 The Mayor Gallery sold Quad 3 to the Tate Gallery in 2019.

Mallary had liver problems in later life, probably due to the toxicity of the liquid polyesters he had used to create his abstract expressionist sculptures in the 1950s and '60s. He lived in Conway, Massachusetts, and died of complications due to leukemia at Cooley Dickinson Hospital in Northampton, Massachusetts in 1997, at age 79. He and his wife Margot had four children: Michelle, Michael, Martine and Martin (who died in 2023), and five grandchildren.
