= Odo Rumpf =

German sculptor

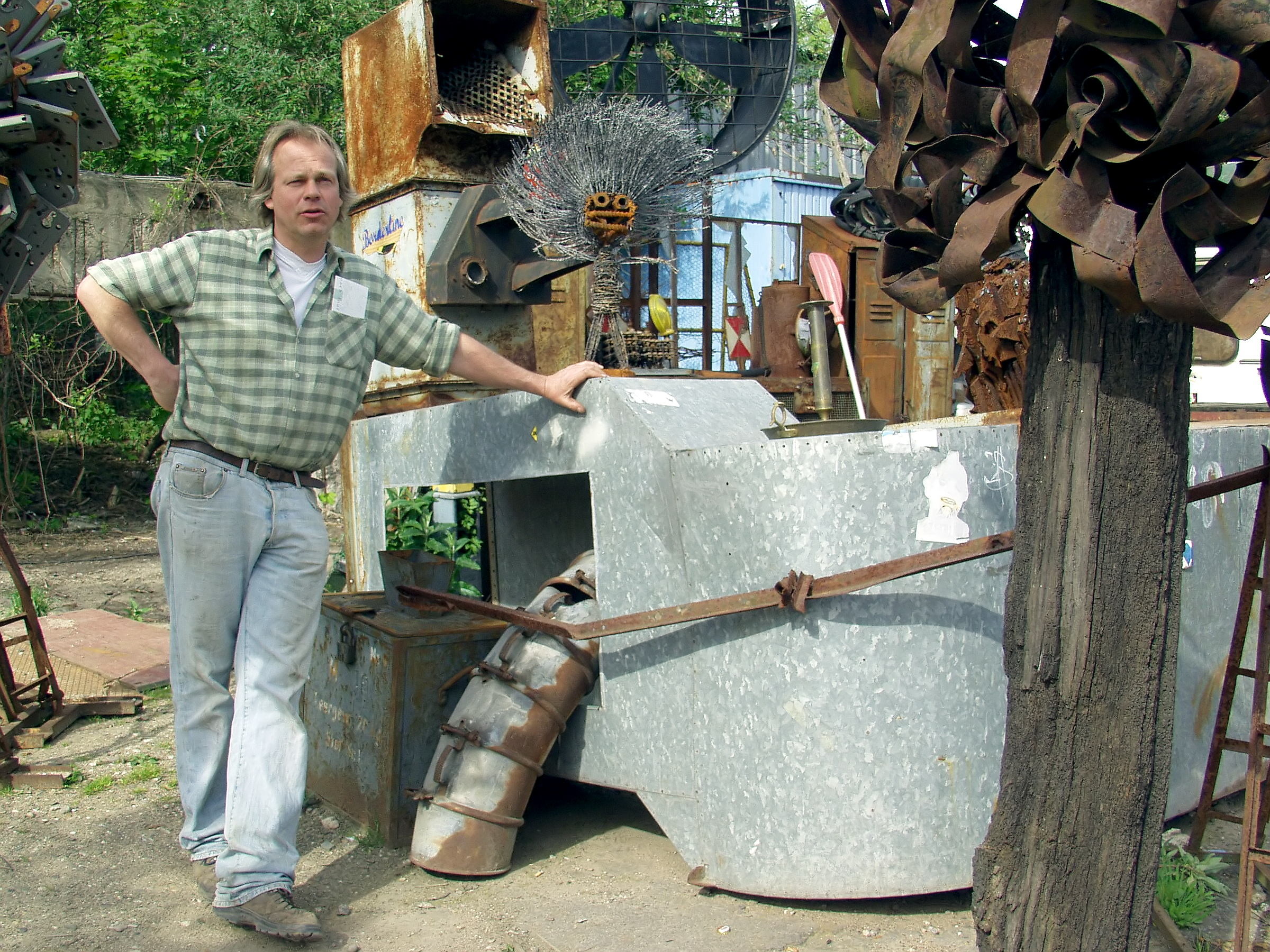
Odo Rumpf in his atelier "Odonien" (2008)

Odo Rumpf (born 3 April 1961 in Leverkusen) is a German sculptor working in Cologne.

== Life ==
After completing his studies of mechanical engineering at the RWTH Aachen, Rumpf studied with the German artist Thomas Virnich for two years and has been working full-time as an artist since 1991.

Odo Rumpf creates sculptures from industrial finds, large kinetic objects, spatial installations and media sculptures.

== Odonien ==
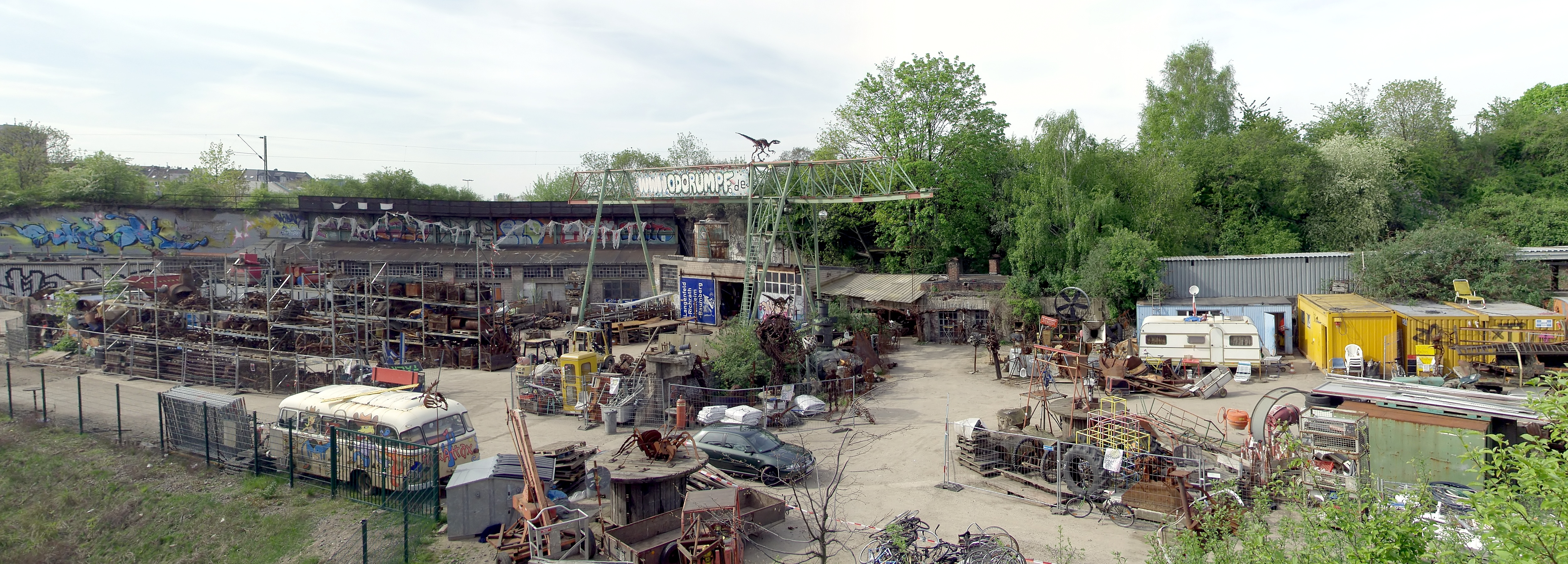
"Odonien" (English: Odonia) (2008)

In 2005, Rumpf converted a 5000 m^{2} large vacant plot of land, located in Köln-Neuehrenfeld between railway tracks at the periphery of the nearby Köln Betriebsbahnhof in the fan-out area of Köln Hauptbahnhof, into an open space studio site and atelier area which became known as "Freistaat Odonien" (English: Free State of Odonia). The site is also used by other international artists. Decorated with metal sculptures, Odonien hosts exhibitions, festivals as well as music, cinematic and dance events. The site and beer garden is also available to rent for events by third parties. Odonien is home to the semi-annual robot show "Robodonien", which has been compared with Burning Man. The nightly fleamarket Bazar de Nuit is also situated there. Since 2020, Odonien also hosts the inclusive RoboLAB festival. In November 2023, the festival was changed to also feature light installations under the name Odonien leuchtet. This is expanded into the arts/lights festival Robodonien leuchtet on two weekends in November 2024.

== Exhibitions ==
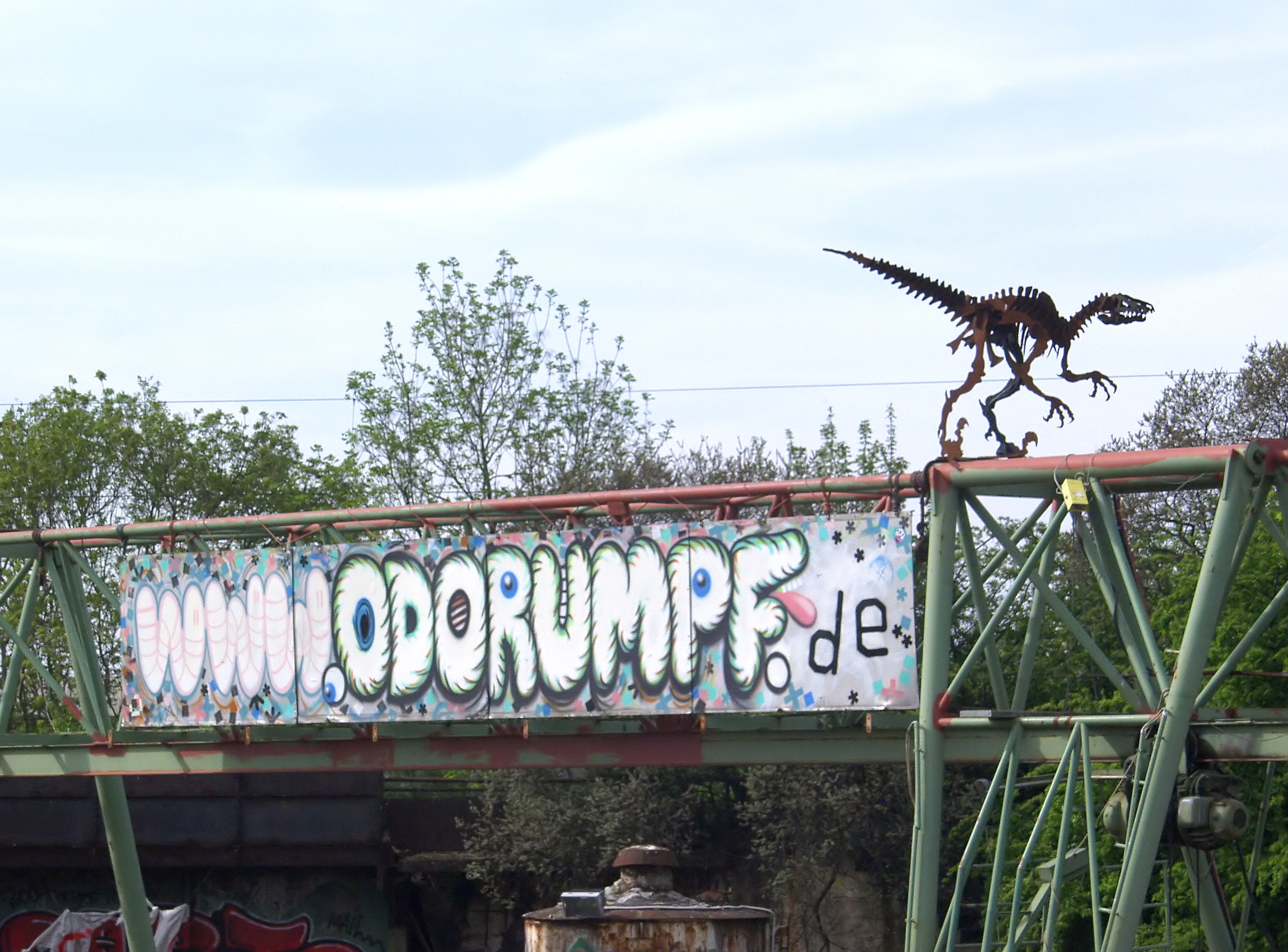
Metal dinosaur in "Odonien" (2008)

An incomplete list of exhibitions:

- 1991 Neuer Aachener Kunstverein, Aachen, Germany
- 1992 Kunstverein Spektrum (exhibition "Moderne"), Leverkusen, Cologne, Germany
- 1993 Gallery Art 54 (exhibition "Strangers"), New York, USA
- 1994 ambiente 94, Designmesse, Ursuliniensäle, Innsbruck, Austria
- 1997 Turmart 97, Geldern, Germany
- 1998 Botanischer Garten Köln (with J. Röderer & V. Kiehn), Cologne, Germany
- 1999 ifficial art cologne, Cologne, Germany
- 2000 1. Kunstmeile, Oberhausen, Germany
- 2001 1. Art-Symposium, Algoz, Portugal
- 2002 Landesgartenschau, Monheim am Rhein, Germany
- 2003 Friedrich-Ebert-Stiftung, Yaoundé, Kamerun
- 2004 Landesgartenschau, Trier, Germany
- 2005 Landesgartenschau, Leverkusen, Cologne, Germany
- 2005 Kulturinstitut, Gallery Phönix, Moscow, Russia
- 2006 Centro Espositivo Rocca Paolina, Perugia, Italia

== Sculptures in public space ==
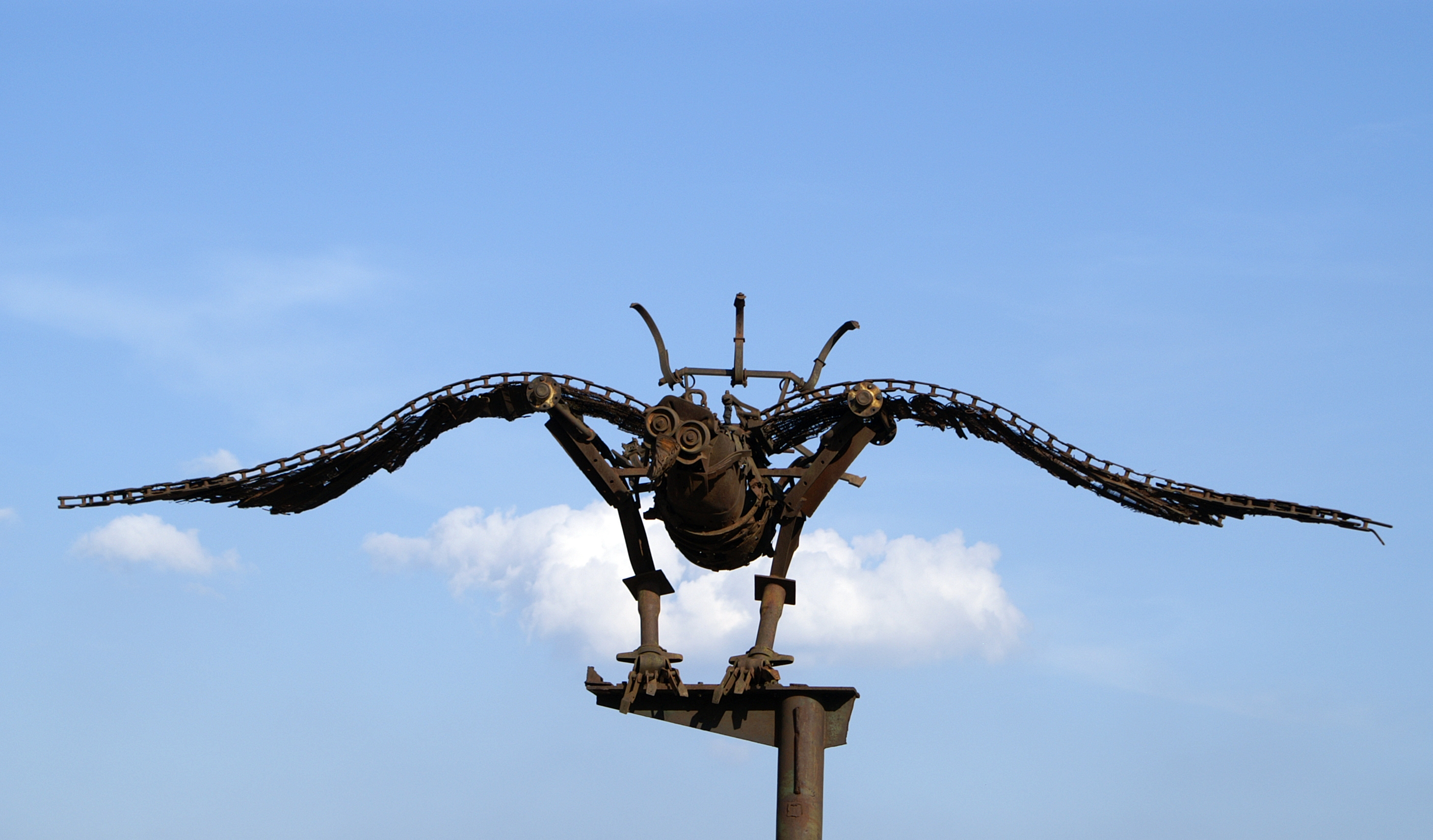
Solar bird (2011)

An incomplete list of sculptures in public space:

- 1993 "Drachenflügel" (dragon wings), Wasserturm, Stadt Geldern, Germany
- 1994 "hydro maszina", Großklärwerk Cologne-Stammheim, Germany
- 1999 "Solarvogel" (solar bird), Rheinpromenade Cologne, Germany
- 2001 Großskulpturen "Baustelle A", Businesspark Niederrhein, Germany
- 2001 "Orpheus", Anatomisches Institut der Uniklinik Köln, Cologne, Germany
- 2002 Skulpturenenvironment "Archos Palingenius", Stadt Monheim, Germany
- 2017 "Slinky", Dreiländergarten in Weil am Rhein, Germany

== Awards ==
A selection of awards:

- 1992 designs fiction, Impuls Design Förderung Berlin, Herbstmesse Frankfurt, Germany
- 1995 Lev-Kunst-95, Forum Leverkusen, Cologne, Germany
- 1997 Europäischer Solarpreis Kunst 1997 von Eurosolar e.V.
- 1999 Palais Allegria, Beaulieu sur Mér, France

== See also ==
- Burning Man
- Frank Köllges
- Kinetic art
- Robotic art
- Rube Goldberg machine
- Sound art
