= Chico MacMurtrie =

Multimedia artist (born 1961)

- Born: Francisco MacMurtrie; 1961 (age 64–65); Deming, New Mexico
- Style: Robotic sculpture
- Website: amorphicrobotworks.org

Francisco "Chico" MacMurtrie (born 1961) is an American multimedia artist based in Brooklyn, New York. Along with his interdisciplinary collective Amorphic Robot Works (ARW), MacMurtrie's practice is centered on the intersection of robotic sculpture, installation art, and performance art.

== Early life and education ==
MacMurtrie was born in Deming, New Mexico in 1961, and grew up in Bisbee, Arizona. He has described his experiences growing up close to the Mexico–United States border as being central to his work.

MacMurtrie attended the University of Arizona from 1980 to 1983, graduating with a Bachelor of Fine Arts degree. From 1983 to 1987, he studied at the University of California, Los Angeles (UCLA), graduating with a Master of Fine Arts degree in New Forms and Concepts.

== Career ==
Between 1987 and 1989, MacMurtrie worked as an artist in residence at the Exploratorium in San Francisco, California.

In 1991, MacMurtrie formed Amorphic Robot Works (ARW), a group of artists and engineers working together to create robotic art performances and installations. Throughout the 1990s, MacMurtrie and ARW created a body of work composed of hundreds of kinetic, and at times percussive or musical, metal sculptures which have been exhibited in different configurations mostly throughout Europe, Asia, and Latin America.

MacMurtrie and ARW's first public art installation was Urge to Stand (1999), a bronze and steel sculpture permanently installed at Yerba Buena Gardens in San Francisco. The sculpture is composed of an androgynous metal figure on top of a 12-foot globe, which mirrors the movements of visitors sitting on or standing up from a bench facing the sculpture. Other public commissions include Fetus to Man (2003), a sculpture/clock for the city of Lille, France, and Growing, Raining Tree (2003), commissioned by the Contemporary Arts Center in Cincinnati, Ohio.

In 2004, MacMurtrie shifted from working with metal to creating his sculptures out of high tensile strength fabric. The inflatable sculptures or "inflatable architectural bodies" are concerned with organic form and the expression of transient qualities of human or animal movement embodied through abstract robotic form.

== The Robotic Church ==
In 2012, MacMurtrie married his wife, Luise, in a disused former location of the Norwegian Seamen’s Church in Red Hook, Brooklyn, which also serves as MacMurtrie's studio. The ceremony included many of MacMurtrie's kinetic and acoustic robotic sculptures, which were installed around the church and "performed" during the pastor's sermon.

In 2013, MacMurtrie and ARW publicly opened the site-specific installation and performance series The Robotic Church, staged in the same church he was married in. The work consists of over 35 robotic "sounding" sculptures, some of which were originally independent pieces by MacMurtrie and ARW, and which date back to the 1980s. The sculptures, which are mostly humanoid in form, each perform a unique musical or percussive function, and can be either pre-programmed or played live to execute dynamic musical performances. The Church is sponsored by the New York Foundation for the Arts.

== Recognition ==
MacMurtrie became a Guggenheim Fellow in 2016. He has been awarded five grants from the National Endowment for the Arts. Other grants and awards he has received include the San Francisco Bay Guardian Goldie Award, Prix Ars Electronica, the VIDA Life 11.0 Third Prize in Hybrid Art, the New York Foundation for the Arts Fellowship, the Map Fund Grant, and the Media Arts Foundation Grant.
