= Cybernetic Serendipity =

Exhibition of cybernetic art

Cybernetic Serendipity was an exhibition of cybernetic art curated by Jasia Reichardt, shown at the Institute of Contemporary Arts, London, England, from 2 August to 20 October 1968, and then toured across the United States. Two stops in the United States were the Corcoran Annex (Corcoran Gallery of Art), Washington, D.C., from 16 July to 31 August 1969, and the newly opened Exploratorium in San Francisco, from 1 November to 18 December 1969.

== Content ==
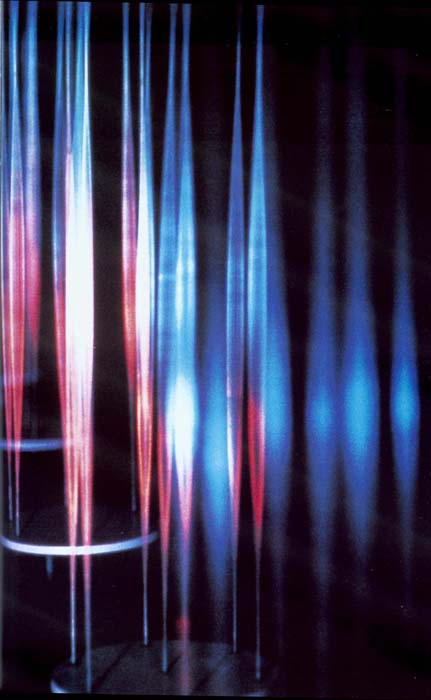
Wen-Ying Tsai system 1 (1968) as presented at the Institute of Contemporary Arts

One part of the exhibition was concerned with algorithms and devices for generating music. Some exhibits were pamphlets describing the algorithms, whilst others showed musical notation produced by computers. Devices made musical effects and played tapes of sounds made by computers. Peter Zinovieff lent part of his studio equipment - visitors could sing or whistle a tune into a microphone and his equipment would improvise a piece of music based on the tune.

Another part described computer projects such as Gustav Metzger's self-destructive Five Screens With Computer, a design for a new hospital, a computer programmed structure, and dance choreography.

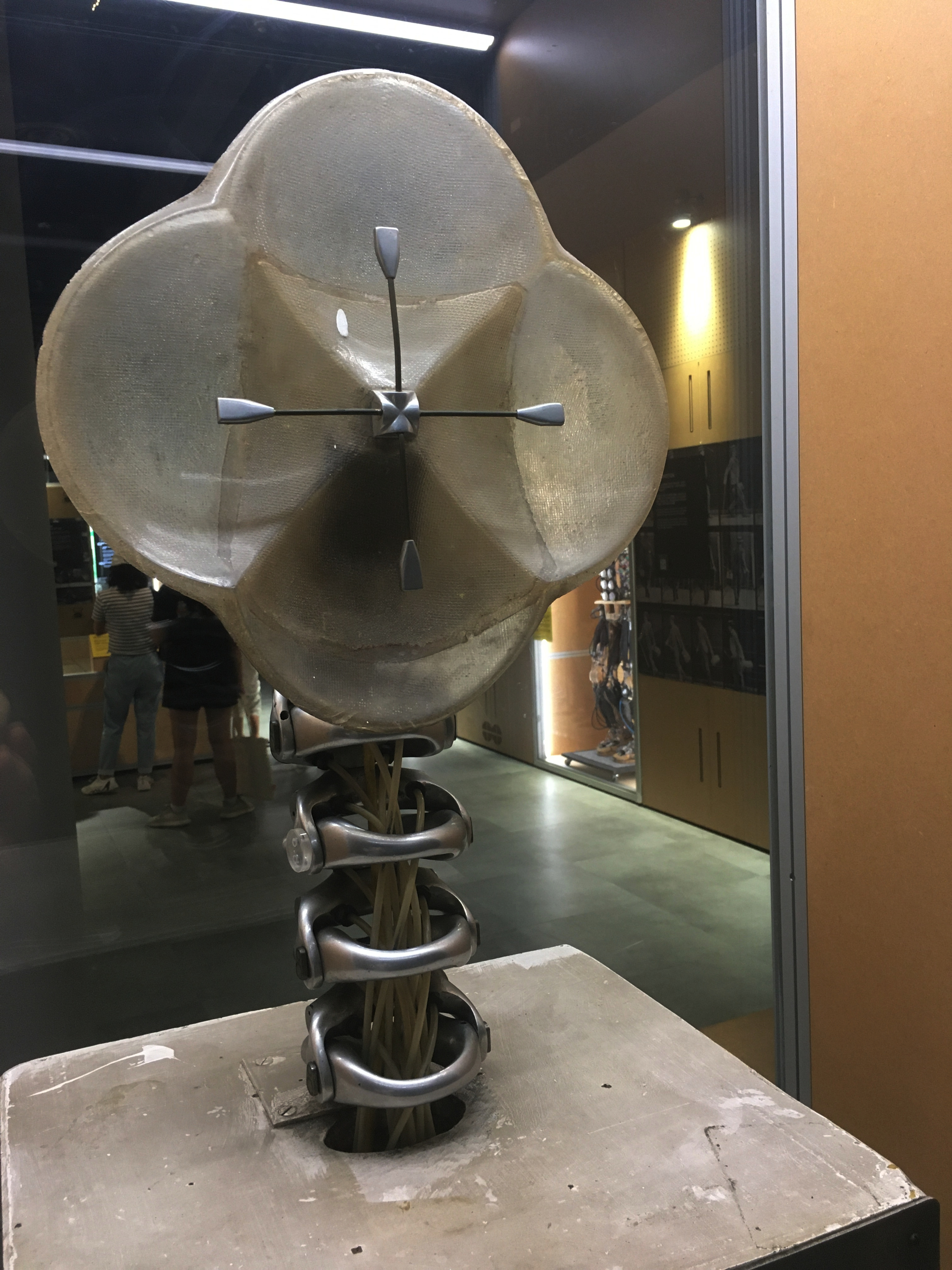
Edward Ihnatowicz Sound Activated Mobile (SAM) (1968), shown as part of Cybernetic Serendipity

The machines and installations were a very noticeable part of the exhibition. Gordon Pask produced a collection of large mobiles (Colloquy of Mobiles (1968)) with interacting parts that let the viewers join in the conversation. Many machines formed kinetic environments or displayed moving images. Bruce Lacey contributed his radio-controlled robots and a light-sensitive owl. Nam June Paik was represented by Robot K-456 and televisions with distorted images. Jean Tinguely provided two of his painting machines. Edward Ihnatowicz's biomorphic hydraulic ear (Sound Activated Mobile (SAM, 1968)) turned toward sounds and John Billingsley's Albert 1967 turned to face light. Wen-Ying Tsai presented his interactive cybernetic sculptures of vibrating stainless-steel rods, stroboscopic light, and audio feedback control. Several artists exhibited machines that drew patterns that the visitor could take away, or involved visitors in games. Cartoonist Rowland Emett designed the mechanical computer Forget-me-not, which was commissioned by Honeywell.

Another section explored the computer's ability to produce text - both essays and poetry. Different programs produced Haiku, children's stories, and essays. One of the first computer-generated poems, by Alison Knowles and James Tenney, was included in the exhibition and catalogue.

Computer-generated movies were represented by John Whitney's Permutations and a Bell Labs movie on their technology for producing movies. Some samples included images of tesseracts rotating in four dimensions, a satellite orbiting the Earth, and an animated data structure.

Computer graphics were also represented, including pictures produced on cathode ray oscilloscopes and digital plotters. There was a variety of posters and graphics demonstrating the power of computers to do complex (and apparently random) calculations. Other graphics showed a simulated Mondrian and the iconic decreasing squares spiral that appeared on the exhibition's poster and book. The Boeing Company exhibited their use of wireframe graphics.

The innovative computer-generated sculpture, Quad 1, was displayed at the Cybernetic Serendipity exhibit. Created by the American abstract expressionist sculptor, Robert Mallary, in 1968, Quad 1 is widely believed to be the world's first Computer Aided Design sculpture.

Keith Albarn & Partners contributed to the design of the exhibition.

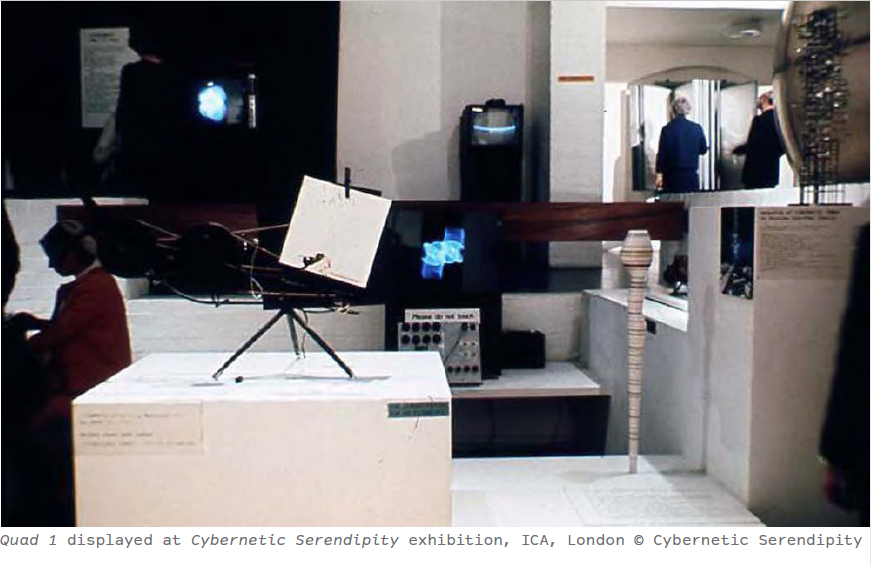
Computer-generated sculpture Quad 1 by Robert Mallary at Cybernetic Serendipity, ICA, London. © Cybernetic Serendipity

Reflecting the prominence of music in the show, a ten-track album Cybernetic Serendipity Music was released by the ICA to accompany the show. Artists featured included Iannis Xenakis, John Cage, and Peter Zinovieff, a detail of whose graphic score for 'Four Sacred April Rounds’ (1968) was used as the cover artwork.

== Attendance ==
Time magazine noted that there had been 40,000 visitors to the London exhibition. Other reports suggested visitor numbers were as high as 44,000 to 60,000. However, the ICA did not accurately count visitors.

== After-effects ==
The exhibition provided the energy for the formation of British Computer Arts Society which continued to explore the interaction between science, technology and art, and put on exhibitions (for example Event One at the Royal College of Art). Several pieces were purchased by the Exploratorium in 1971, some of which are on display to this day.

In 2014 the ICA held a retrospective exhibition Cybernetic Serendipity: A Documentation which included documents, installation photographs, press reviews and publications and a series of discussions in one of which Peter Zinovieff took part. To coincide with the exhibition, Cybernetic Serendipity Music was re-released as a limited-edition vinyl LP by The Vinyl Factory.

The Victoria and Albert Museum marked the 50th anniversary with an exhibition in 2018 entitled "Chance and Control: Art in the Age of Computers". The V&A exhibition included many works by artists who featured in the original ICA show, plus related ephemera. "Chance and Control" subsequently toured to Chester Visual Arts and Firstsite, Colchester.

In 2020, The Centre Pompidou exhibited the replica of Gordon Pask's 1968 Colloquy of Mobiles, reproduced by Paul Pangaro and TJ McLeish in 2018.

In 2022 the Australian National University's School of Cybernetics launched the school by presenting an exhibition Australian Cybernetic: a point through time. The exhibition included works from Cybernetic Serendipity (1968), Australia ‘75: Festival of Creative Arts and Science (1975), and contemporary pieces curated by the School of Cybernetics. In describing Reichardt's Cybernetic Serendipity exhibition the school stated that it "represented points of expanding the cybernetic imagination" and was a "ground-breaking" "glimpse of a future in which computers were entangled with people and cultures, and through this she fashioned a blueprint for the future of computing that has since inspired generations".

== See also ==
- Algorithmic art
- Computer art
- Cybernetics
- Electronic Art
- Generative art
- New Media Art
- Post-conceptual
- Systems art
- Virtual art
