= Zaven Paré =

French new media artist (born 1961)

Zaven Paré is a French new media artist born in 1961.

== Life ==
Painter for state manufacture of tapestry of Beauvais in 1987, he worked for the Manufacture des Gobelins N.I.M.E.S. project on the replacement of Chevreul's cabinet. He became painter for the Manufacture nationale de Sèvres in 1991.

In 1988, he created his first inflate structure for the set design of the choreographer Marie Chouinard, for the Olympics Arts Festival of Calgary, and started working for Edouard Lock. He drew the circular video projection screens for the 1990 David Bowie tour and designed a sound installation for Mauricio Kagel in 1992 at the Museum of Contemporary Art of Montreal. In 1998 he designed a double slope floor for the set design of Don Giovanni at the Opéra Bastille.

In 1996, Zaven Paré designed his first Electronic Marionette from a source of video retro-projection in Canada, followed in 1999 by the digital version (digital puppetry with electronic guidance), controlled with a keyboard, for the show which he directed at the Cotsen Center for Puppetry of CalArts (California Institute of the Arts). In 2002, he projected the analogic version of his electronic marionette, controlled by voice, this time for Valère Novarina at the Festival d'Avignon. Those two marionettes are respectively in the collection of the Ballard Institute and Museum of Puppetry and the Gadagne Museum. Zaven Paré is one of the researchers of the Robot Actors Project of Professor Hiroshi Ishiguro.

== Grants ==
- 1999 and 2001 French American Fund of Performing Arts, California Institute of the Arts.
- 2002 RioArte, Rio de Janeiro.
- 2009 Villa Kujoyama, Kyoto.
- 2010 Japan Society for Promotion of Science, Osaka University.
- 2011 Premio Sergio Motta em Arte e technologia, São Paulo.

== Works ==
- Zaven Paré, O robô e a maçã. Rio de Janeiro : 7 Letras, 2010, v.1. p. 128.
- Zaven Paré, Maquínas. Rio de Janeiro : 7 Letras, 2010, v.1. p. 116.

== See also ==
- New media art
- Robotic art
- Digital puppetry
- Puppet
- Performing Arts
