= Serge Fauchereau =

French scholar and art curator

Serge Fauchereau (born October 31, 1939, in Rochefort-sur-mer) is a French scholar and art curator responsible for the exhibitions Paris-New York, Paris-Berlin, Paris-Moscow, Europa-Europa, Futurismo and Futurismi, among others.

== Biography ==
After having been a professor of American literature at New York University and University of Texas at Austin from 1973 to 1976, Fauchereau became a curator of international exhibitions at the Centre Georges Pompidou in Paris and other institutions, such as the Palazzo Grassi in Venice, the Kunsthalle in Bonn, and the Tate Modern in London. He was also curator of the Bruno Schulz retrospective at the Museum of Art and History of Judaism in Paris, of Mexico-Europe at the Museum of Modern Art in Lille-Villeneuve d'Ascq, and the retrospective of German Cueto at the Reina Sofia National Museum in Madrid.In 2015 he curated the first ever museum exhibition dedicated to Tristan Tzara.
