= Omnicircus =

Event venue in San Francisco, California

The Omnicircus was a theater, gallery and performance art space that was established in 1992 by Frank Garvey in San Francisco, California.

Omnicircus was home to Garvey’s ensemble as well as being an installation of his films, paintings, sculptures, music, photographs, and robots. The OmniCircus shows integrated live acting, music, dance and filmography with sophisticated mechanical actors and midi-controlled, computer-animated (VIRpt) performers.

The OmniCircus was forced to leave its space early in 2015.
