= Edward Ihnatowicz =

Polish cybernetic artist (1926–1988)

Edward Ihnatowicz (14 February 1926 in Chełm – 1988 in London) was a Polish cybernetic art sculptor active in the late 1960s and early 1970s. His sculptures explored the interaction between his robotic works and the audience.

He was a pioneer of the use of computers in art and especially robots as art. As Eduardo Kac states:

...three artworks created in the mid and late sixties stand as landmarks in the development of robotic art: Nam June Paik and Shuya Abe's Robot K-456 (1964), Tom Shannon's Squat (1966), and Edward Ihnatowicz's The Senster (1969-1970). While these works are very significant in their own right, they acquire a particular meaning when re-considered today, since seen together they also configure a triangle of new aesthetic issues that has continually informed the main directions in robotic art.

He was an active member of the Computer Arts Society.

== Cybernetic works ==
=== SAM ===
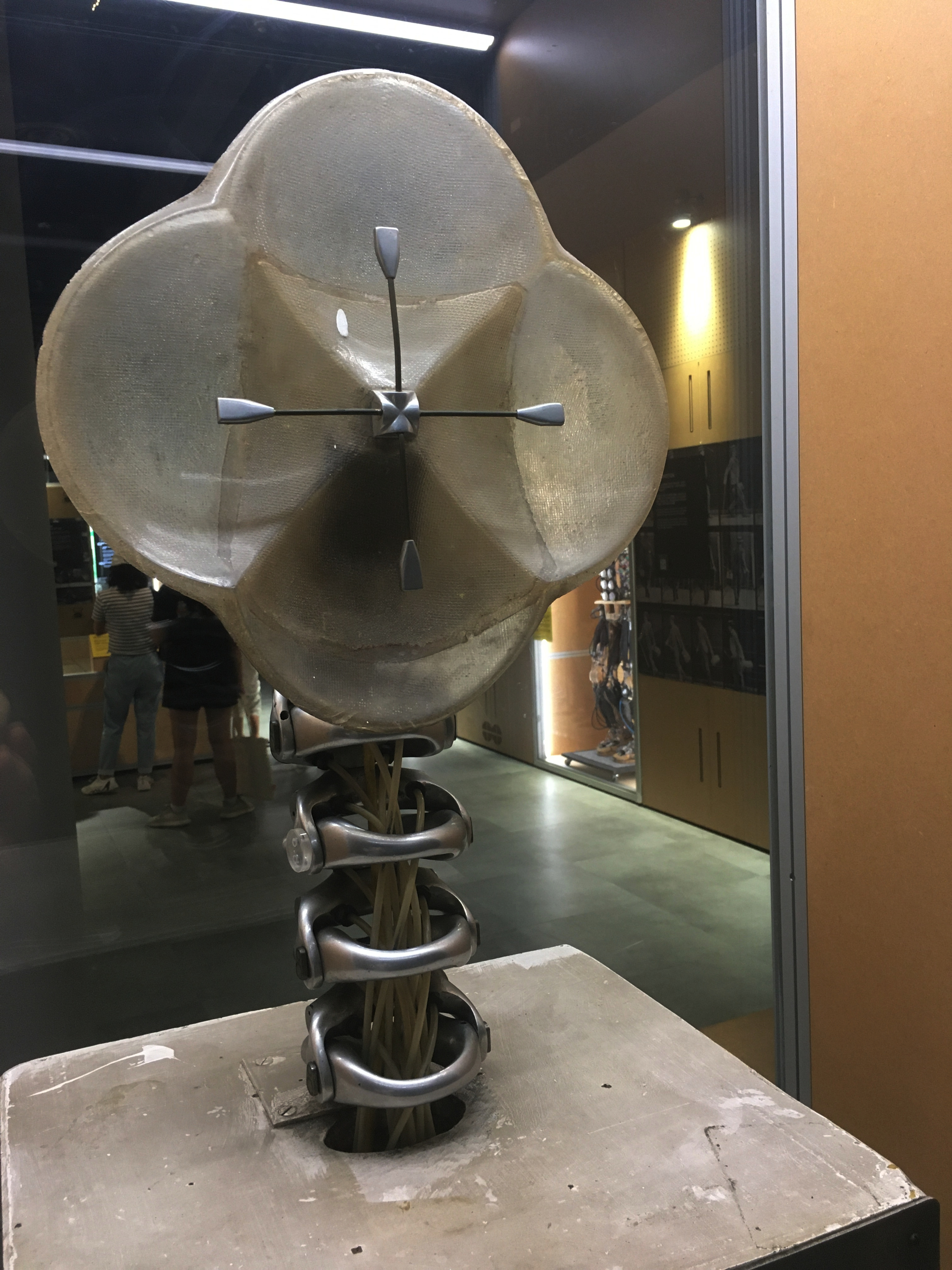
Sound Activated Mobile (1968)

His first cybernetic work that moved directly and recognisably in response to what was going on around it was the Sound Activated Mobile (SAM). It had four microphones mounted in front of fiberglass parabolic reflectors (reminiscent of a flower) on top of a spine-like column of aluminium castings. Hydraulic pistons in the vertebra-like units allowed the neck to twist from side-to-side and bend forwards and backwards. An analogue circuit was used to control the hydraulics to move the robot to face the direction of the predominant sound. It was exhibited at the Cybernetic Serendipity exhibition which was held initially at the Institute of Contemporary Arts in London in 1968 and later toured Canada and the US ending at the Exploratorium in San Francisco. SAM's behaviour, that of turning to face people as they talked and tracking their movement if they continued to make a sound, together with its sensitivity to quiet but sustained noise, rather than loud shouts, encouraged many people to spend time in front of it, trying to attract its attention.

=== The Senster ===
His most significant work was The Senster, a large hydraulically actuated robot that followed the sound and motion of the people around it, giving the impression of being alive. The Senster was the first robotic sculpture to be controlled by a computer. It used an array of four microphones to detect the direction of the sound around it and two Doppler radar arrays to measure the motion of people. A computer program controlled the hydraulic actuators to move the body so that the Senster was attracted by sound and movement but repelled by loud noises and violent motion. The program bears a strong resemblance to that used in behavior-based robotics developed a decade later.

=== The Bandit ===
His final work of Cybernetic Art was The Bandit, which was exhibited at the Computer Arts Society exhibition at the Edinburgh Festival, UK in 1973. It was a hydraulically actuated lever controlled by a computer and had two modes: one where it was position controlled and one where it was force controlled. When a visitor first held onto the lever, it was force controlled, with a demand value of zero. The person could thus move the arm as he/she pleased. The computer system recorded the series of motions, then switched to position control mode, where it played the series of positions back to the person. The way the person reacted to the motion of the arm was statistically analysed and the computer program printed out its classification of the gender and temperament of the person.

== Biography ==
From 1939 to 1943 Ihnatowicz was a war refugee in Romania and Algiers. In 1943 he arrived in Britain and from 1945 to 1949 he attended The Ruskin School of Drawing and Fine Art, Oxford. From 1971 to 1986 he worked as a Research Assistant in the Department of Mechanical Engineering at University College London.
