= Laurence Bertrand Dorléac =

French art historian and author

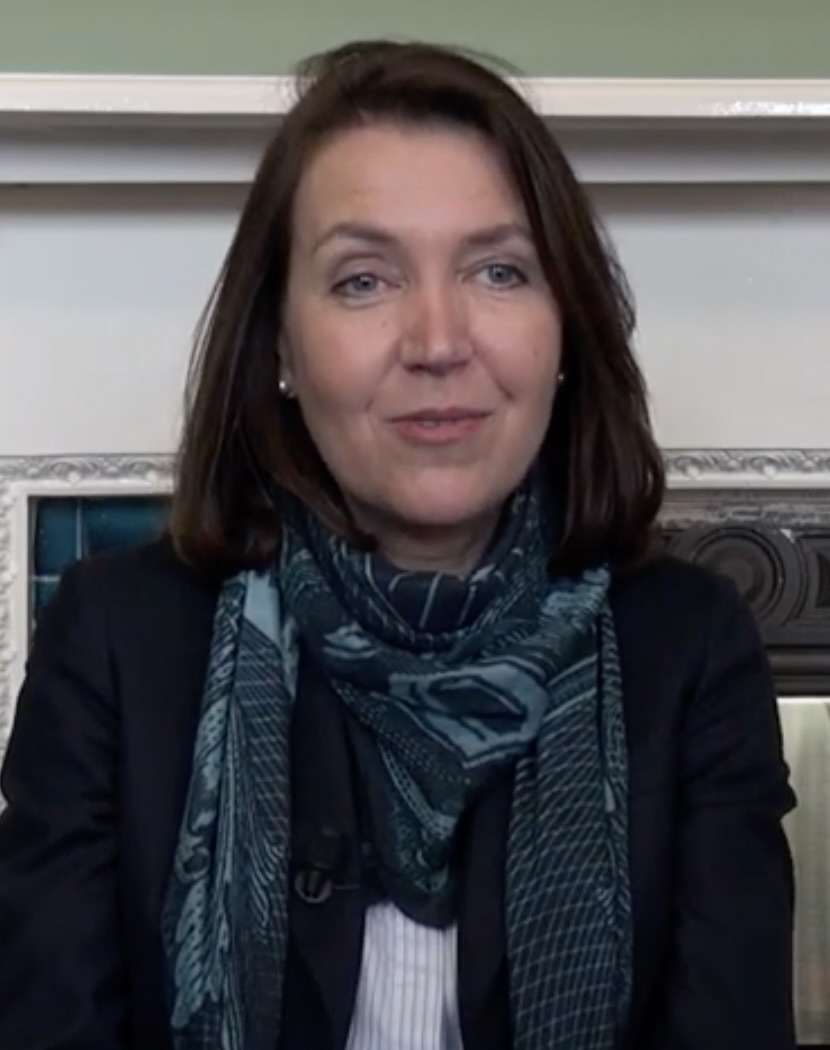

President of the Fondation Nationale des Sciences Politiques
- Incumbent
- Assumed office 10 May 2021

Personal details
- Born: 14 January 1957 (age 69) Boulogne-Billancourt, France
- Alma mater: University of Paris; Sciences Po
- Profession: Art historian

Laurence Bertrand Dorléac (born 14 January 1957) is a French art historian specializing in contemporary art, a professor and an author. She was elected president of the Fondation nationale des sciences politiques in May 2021. She resides in Boulogne-Billancourt, France.

== Biography ==
=== Education ===
Laurence Bertrand-Dorléac is the daughter of a member of the French Resistance. She has a doctorate in art history and archeology from University of Paris 1 Pantheon-Sorbonne (1984), and a doctorate in history from the Sciences Po (IEP) in Paris (1990), and has been advising doctoral students since 1995.

=== Career ===
She started teaching at Sciences Po, Paris, in 1990. She taught at the University of Lille from 1993 to 1995. That year, she obtained tenure as professor at the University of Picardy, where she founded the art history department. She is now an art history professor at Sciences Po where she leads the Art et Sociétés and La Lettre Seminaire. She is a researcher at the Centres d'Études de Sciences Po, and was appointed to the Institut Universitaire de France in 1990.

She is co-curator with Jacqueline Munck of the exhibition L'art en guerre, France 1938–1947 (Art in War, France 1938–1947), Musée d'art moderne de la Ville de Paris, 2012, and the Guggenheim in Bilbao in 2013. She also led the production of the catalogue Paris-Musées La Fabrica. She is also co-curator with Maurice Fréchuret of the exhibition Exils, Musées nationaux Fernand Léger and Marc Chagall, 2012, and general commissioner of the exhibition Les désastres de la guerre 1800–2014 (The Disasters of War), at Louvre-Lens, from May until October 2014, in addition to being responsible for the catalogue, which was published by Louvre-Lens/Somogy.

Bertrand-Dorléac also founded the art history department and directed the Faculty of Arts at Amiens from 1995 to 2000. She co-founded with Xavier Douroux, the book series Œuvres en sociétés with the publishing house du réel, 2007. Currently she is co-director with Thomas Kirchner, of the Centre allemand d'histoire de l'art, specifically the program of art in the world, and art in Paris after 1945, 2014.

== Honors and distinctions ==
She was awarded both the Chevalier des Arts et Lettres and the Chevalier de la Légion d'honneur in 2013.

== Committees chaired ==
She has been a member of the International Association of Art Critics (AICA) since 1993, and she sits on many committees. Please see the list below.

- Scientific council for l'Institut Mémoire de l'édition Contemporaine (IMEC), from 2008 to 2013
- Scientific council for Musée National Fernand Léger, from 2009 to 2012
- Scientific council for École Nationale Supérieure des Arts Décoratifs, since 2010
- Board of directors for the Foundation Hartung-Bergman, since 2011
- Scientific council for Musée d'Orsay, from 2011- January 2014
- Acquisitions committee of the public museums of the Musée d'Orsay and Musée de l'Orangerie, since February 2014
- Board of directors for the École du Louvre, from 2011 to 2014 and a second period starting since May 8, 2014
- Board of directors for the Musée de l'Armée, since 2014

== Publications ==
- Le lion de Rosa (Bonheur), Gallimard, 2024.
- Un ours dans la tête. Greta Thunberg, Folio, 2022.
- Arcimboldo, rhétoriqueur et magicien de Roland Barthes, Éditions de la Sorbonne, 2021.
- Pour en finir avec la nature morte, Gallimard, 2020.
- Les désastres de la guerre. 1803-2014, exhibition catalogue, Somogy-Louvre Lens, 2014.
- L'art en guerre. France 1938-1947, catalogue d'exposition, co.dir., Jacqueline Munck, Paris-Musées, 2013.
- Arte en Guerra. France 1938-1947, catalogue d'exposition, trad. du français, La Fabrica, Guggenheim, Bilbao, 1913.
- Against-decline, Monet and Spengler in the gardens of history (Contre-déclin : Monet et Spengler dans les jardins de l'histoire), Gallimard, 2012, ISBN 978-2-07-013762-6
- Postwar, Art and Artist Collection (Après la Guerre, Collection Art et Artistes), Gallimard, 2010, ISBN 9782070127429
- Art of the Defeat. France 1940-1944, traduit par Jane Mary Todd, Getty Research Institute.
- Villeglé. Politique, Ides et Calendes, 2008.
- Fernand Léger, Les Constructeurs, Catalogue de l'exposition, Réunion des Musées Nationaux, 2008.
- Picasso l’objet du mythe, actes de colloque, École nationale supérieure des Beaux-Arts, codirection de la publication avec Michaël Androula, 2005.
- Wild College, Violence, Expense and Sacred Art from 1950 to 1960 (L'Ordre sauvage, Violence, Dépense et Sacré dans l'art des années 1950-1960, collection Art et artistes), Gallimard, 2004, ISBN 2070770729
- Magnelli. Les années 1920, Editions Zannettacci, 2004.
- Erró, Ides et Calendes, collection Polychrome, 2004.
- Image et histoire, numéro spécial de Vingtième Siècle, no 72, octobre - décembre 2001, L. Bertrand-Dorléac, C. Delage, A. Gunthert, 2001
- Miguel Chevalier, préface de Pierre Restany, texte de Laurence Bertrand Dorléac, interview avec Patrick Imbard, Flammarion, Paris, 2001
- Where is the history of contemporary art? (Où va l'histoire de l'art contemporain?), L'Image, 493 p., direction de la publication, 1997
- The Art of Defeat: 1940-1944 (L'Art de la défaite: 1940-1944), Seuil, 1993, ISBN 2021018806.
- Le Commerce de l'art : de la Renaissance à nos jours, La Manufacture, 357 p., direction de la publication, 1992, ISBN 9782737703256
- Histoire de l'art : Paris, 1940-1944, Ordre national, Traditions et Modernités, préface de Michel Winock, Publications de la Sorbonne, 1996, ISBN 2859441220

== See also ==
- Women in the art history field
