= Electronic art =

Art that uses or refers to electronic media

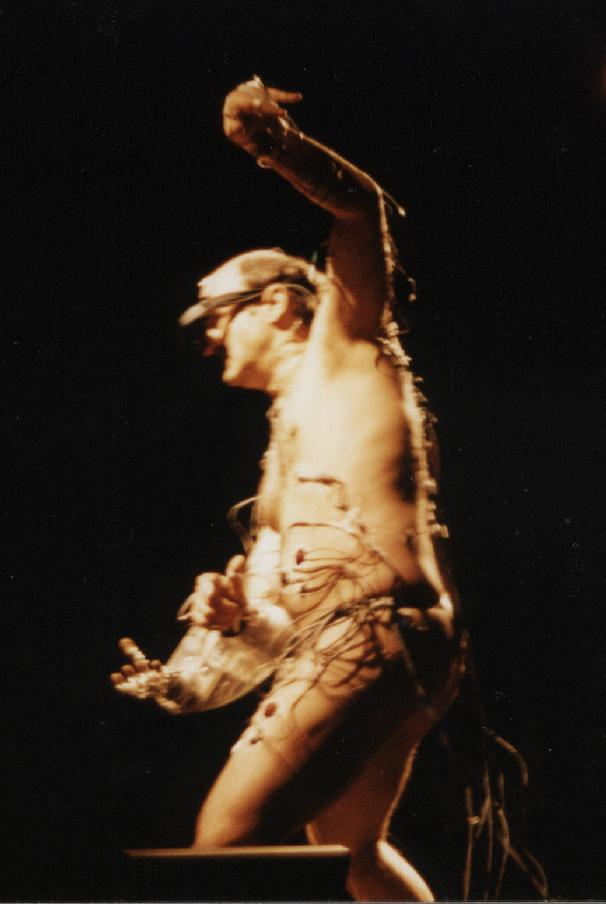
Stelarc Parasite: Event for Invaded and Involuntary Body, at the 1997 Ars Electronica Festival

Electronic art is a form of art that makes use of electronic media. More broadly, it refers to technology and/or electronic media. It is related to information art, new media art, video art, digital art, interactive art, internet art, and electronic music. It is considered an outgrowth of conceptual art and systems art.

== Background ==
The term electronic art is almost synonymous to computer art and digital art. The latter two terms, and especially the term computer-generated art are mostly used for visual artworks generated by computers. However, electronic art has a much broader connotation, referring to artworks that include any type of electronic component, such as works in music, dance, architecture and performance. It is an interdisciplinary field in which artists, scientists and engineers often collaborate when creating their works. The art historian of electronic art Edward A. Shanken works to document current and past experimental art with a focus on the intersection of art, science, and technology. Other writers on the topic of electronic art include Frank Popper, Dominique Moulon, Sarah Cook, and Christiane Paul.

Electronic art often features components of interactivity. Artists make use of technologies like the Internet, computer networks, robotics, wearable technology, digital painting, Wireless technology and immersive virtual reality. As the technologies used to deliver works of electronic art become obsolete, electronic art faces serious issues around the challenge to preserve artwork beyond the time of its contemporary production. Currently, research projects are underway to improve the preservation and documentation of the fragile electronic arts heritage (see DOCAM – Documentation and Conservation of the Media Arts Heritage). Digital graphics software such as Photoshop allows for the digital manipulation of analog photographs, the creation of wholly electronic images, and application of AI-enhanced generative fills.

== Wearable Tech ==
With the advancements in lightweight microchips, wireless capabilities, sensors and motion tracking technology, new mediums in digital art and performance have become possible. Technology has the capability to augment and manipulate reality as well as audience or viewer perception. Motion tracking suits are used in creating 3D renders of animated characters for film and video games. The animation or CGI produced can be edited and adjusted before viewing, but research into real time rendering for live performance art is being streamlined through the use of artificial intelligence, automation, and programing. Live renders are similarly used in the metaverse to create more realistic avatar movement and expression. Further implications of wearable technology include audio and music production. Laurie Anderson is a performance artist who used a suit equipped with amplified tactile sensors. She used her movements to create music, as various body parts were assigned different percussive or instrumental sounds and tones when hit or moved. Similar to this musical tech is the SOMI-1 device as used in the dance performance entitled “My body is an instrument” by: Mike Tyus and Luca Renzi. This piece of technology was designed by the company Instrument of Things; the SOMI-1 is a small proprioceptive disk that tracks movement and translates it into sound.

== Art festivals that use the term "electronic art" in their name ==
- International Symposium for Electronic Art (ISEA), organized annually since 1988, international
- Ars Electronica Symposium, organized yearly since 1979 by Ars Electronica in Linz, Austria
- Dutch Electronic Art Festival (DEAF), organized yearly since 1994 by V2 Institute for the Unstable Media in Rotterdam, the Netherlands
- Electronic Language International Festival (FILE) organized yearly since 2000 in São Paulo, Brazil
- The Prix Ars Electronica, a major yearly award for several categories of electronic art

== Artists ==
Notable artists working in electronic art include:

- Laurie Anderson
- Roy Ascott
- Maurice Benayoun
- Maurizio Bolognini
- Angie Bonino
- Mez Breeze
- Miguel Chevalier
- Heiko Daxl
- Elizabeth Diller
- David Em
- Ken Feingold
- Ingeborg Fülepp
- Peter Gabriel
- Walter Giers
- Pietro Grossi
- Genco Gulan
- Garnet Hertz
- Perry Hoberman
- Jodi (art collective)
- Eduardo Kac
- Knowbotic Research
- Marc Lee
- George Legrady
- Golan Levin
- Liu Dao
- Rafael Lozano-Hemmer
- Chico MacMurtrie
- Sergio Maltagliati
- Jennifer & Kevin McCoy
- Yucef Merhi
- Jonathan Monaghan
- Joseph Nechvatal
- Yves Netzhammer
- Graham Nicholls
- Simon Penny
- Melinda Rackham
- Martin Rev
- Ken Rinaldo
- David Rokeby
- Stefan Roloff
- Lillian Schwartz
- Ricardo Scofidio
- Paul Sermon
- Scott Snibbe
- Michael Snow
- Stelarc
- Survival Research Laboratories
- Gianni Toti
- Tamás Waliczky
- Norman White
- Allan Kaprow

== See also ==
- Algorithm art
- Artificial intelligence art
- Artmedia
- Computer art
- Computer art scene
- Computer graphics
- Computer music
- Cybernetic art
- Demoscene
- Digital art
- Digital illustration
- Digital painting
- Digital poetry
- EVA Conferences (Electronic Visualisation and the Arts)
- Evolutionary art
- Fractal art
- Generative art
- Image development
- Interactive art
- Intermedia
- Multimedia
- Music visualization
- New media art
- Systems art

== Bibliography ==
- Nicolas Bourriaud, Relational Aesthetics, Dijon: Les Presses du Réel, 2002, orig. 1997
- Paul Brown, Charlie Gere, Nicholas Lambert, Catherine Mason (eds.), White Heat Cold Logic: British Computer Art 1960–1980, Cambridge, MA: The MIT Press, 2006
- Christine Buci-Glucksmann, "L’art à l’époque du virtuel", in Frontières esthétiques de l’art, Arts 8, Paris: L’Harmattan, 2004
- Frank Popper, Art of the Electronic Age, Thames & Hudson, 1997
- Joline Blais and Jon Ippolito, At the Edge of Art, Thames & Hudson, 2006
- Charlie Gere, Digital Culture, Reaktion, 2002. ISBN 978-1-86189-143-3
- Oliver Grau (2003). Virtual Art: From Illusion to Immersion (Leonardo Book Series). Cambridge, Massachusetts: The MIT Press/Leonardo Books. ISBN 0-262-07241-6.
- Oliver Grau (Ed.): Media Art Histories, MIT Press/Leonardo Books, 2007.
- Mark Hansen, New Philosophy for New Media, Cambridge, MA: The MIT Press, 2004
- Norman M. Klein, "Spaces Between: Traveling Through Bleeds, Apertures, and Wormholes Inside the Database Novel," in Third Person: Authoring and Exploring Vast Narratives, Pat Harrigan and Noah Wardip-Fruin (eds.), Cambridge, MA: The MIT Press, 2009
- Donald Kuspit "Del Atre Analogico al Arte Digital" in Arte Digital Y Videoarte, Kuspit, D. (ed.), Consorcio del Circulo de Bellas Artes, Madrid, pp. 33–34 & 3 color images
- Donald Kuspit, The Matrix of Sensations, VI: Digital Artists and the New Creative Renaissance
- Alan Liu, The Laws of Cool: Knowledge Work and the Culture of Information, The University of Chicago Press, pp. 331–336 & 485–486
- Dominic McIver Lopes, A Philosophy of Computer Art, London: Routledge, 2009
- Lev Manovich, The Language of New Media, Cambridge, Massachusetts: The MIT Press/Leonardo Books, 2001. ISBN 0-262-63255-1
- Lev Manovich, Ten Key Texts on Digital Art: 1970–2000, Leonardo, Volume 35, Number 5, October 2002, pp. 567–569
- Yucef Merhi, Artists' Fellowship – 2009 Digital/Electronic Arts, New York Foundation for the Arts, 2009
- Robert C. Morgan Digital Hybrids, art press, Volume 255
- Christiane Paul, Digital Art, Thames & Hudson
- Frank Popper, From Technological to Virtual Art, The MIT Press/Leonardo Books, 2007
- Frank Popper, Origins and Development of Kinetic Art, Studio Vista and New York Graphic Society, 1968
- Frank Popper, Die Kinetische Kunst-Licht und Bewegung, Umweltkunst und Aktion, Dumont Schauberg, 1975
- Frank Popper, Le Déclin de l'objet, Le Chêne, 1975
- Dick Higgins, Intermedia, 1966. Reprinted in Donna De Salvo (ed.), Open Systems Rethinking Art c. 1970, London: Tate Publishing, 2005
- Margot Lovejoy, Digital Currents: Art in the Electronic Age, Routledge, 2004
- Frank Popper, Art—Action and Participation, New York University Press, 1975
- Frank Popper, Origins and Development of Kinetic Art, New York Graphic Society/Studio Vista, 1968
- Frank Popper, Réflexions sur l'exil, l'art et l'Europe : Entretiens avec Aline Dallier, Klincksieck, 1998
- Frank Popper, Ecrire sur l'art : De l'art optique a l'art virtuel, L'Harmattan, 2007
- Fred Forest, Art et Internet, Editions Cercle D'Art / Imaginaire Mode d'Emploi
- Sarah J. Rogers (ed.), Body Mécanique: Artistic Explorations of Digital Realms, Columbus, Ohio, Wexner Center for the Arts, The Ohio State University, 1998* Edward A. Shanken Selected Writings on Art and Technology http://artexetra.com
- Edward A. Shanken Art and Electronic Media. London: Phaidon, 2009. ISBN 978-0-7148-4782-5
- Rainer Usselmann, The Dilemma of Media Art: Cybernetic Serendipity at the ICA London., Cambridge, Massachusetts: The MIT Press/Leonardo Journal, Volume 36, Number 5, October 2003, pp. 389–396
- Bruce Wands, Art of the Digital Age, London: Thames & Hudson, 2006. ISBN 978-0500238172
