= Prix Ars Electronica =

Prize for electronic and interactive art

Logo Prix Ars Electronica

The Prix Ars Electronica is one of the best known and longest running yearly prizes in the field of electronic and interactive art, computer animation, digital culture and music. It has been awarded since 1987 by Ars Electronica (Linz, Austria).

In 2005, the Golden Nica, the highest prize, was awarded in six categories: "Computer Animation/Visual Effects," "Digital Musics," "Interactive Art," "Net Vision," "Digital Communities" and the "u19" award for "freestyle computing." Each Golden Nica came with a prize of €10,000, apart from the u19 category, where the prize was €5,000. In each category, there are also Awards of Distinction and Honorary Mentions.

The Golden Nica trophy is a replica of the Greek Nike of Samothrace. It is a handmade gold-plated wooden statuette that is approximately 35 cm high with a wingspan of about 20 cm.

"Prix Ars Electronica" is a phrase composed of French, Latin and Spanish words, loosely translated as "Electronic Arts Prize."

== Golden Nica winners ==
=== Computer animation / film / vfx ===
The "Computer Graphics" category (1987–1994) was open to different kinds of computer images. The "Computer Animation" (1987–1997) was replaced by the current "Computer Animation/Visual Effects" category in 1998.

==== Computer Graphics ====
- 1987 – Figur10 by Brian Reffin Smith, UK
- 1988 – The Battle by David Sherwin, US
- 1989 – Gramophone by Tamás Waliczky, HU
- 1990 – P-411-A by Manfred Mohr, Germany
- 1991 – Having encountered Eve for the second time, Adam begins to speak by Bill Woodard, US
- 1992 – RD Texture Buttons by Michael Kass and Andrew Witkin, US
- 1993 – Founders Series by Michael Tolson, US
- 1994 – Jellylife / Jellycycle / Jelly Locomotion by Michael Joaquin Grey, US

==== Computer Animation ====
- 1987 – Luxo Jr. by John Lasseter, US
- 1988 – Red's Dream by John Lasseter, US
- 1989 – Broken Heart by Joan Staveley, US
- 1990 – Footprint by Mario Sasso and Nicola Sani, IT
- 1991 – Panspermia by Karl Sims, US
- 1992 – Liquid Selves / Primordial Dance by Karl Sims, US
- 1993 – Lakmé by Pascal Roulin, BE
- 1994 – Jurassic Park by Dennis Muren, Mark Dippé and Steve Williams, US/CA
  - Distinction: Quarxs by Maurice Benayoun, FR
  - Distinction: K.O. Kid by Marc Caro, FR
- 1995 – God's Little Monkey by David Atherton and Bob Sabiston, US
- 1996 – Toy Story by John Lasseter, Lee Unkrich and Ralph Eggleston, US
- 1997 – Dragonheart by Scott Squires, Industrial Light & Magic (ILM), US

==== Computer Animation/Visual Effects ====
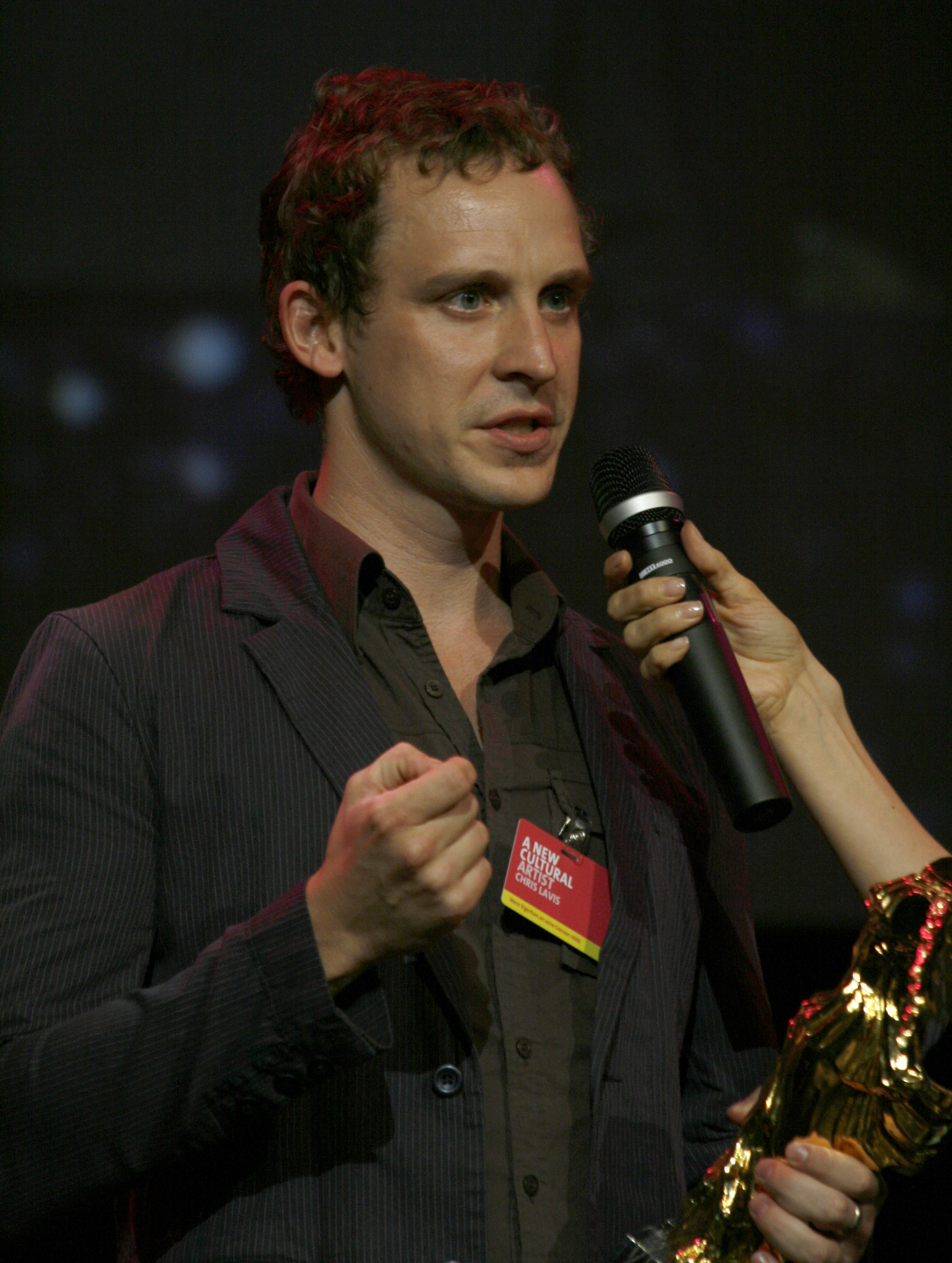
Chris Lavis with the Golden Nica for "Madame Tutli-Putli" (2008)

- 1998 – The Sitter by Liang-Yuan Wang, TW
  - Titanic by Robert Legato and Digital Domain, US
- 1999 – Bunny by Chris Wedge, US
  - What Dreams May Come by Mass Illusions, POP, Digital Domain, Vincent Ward, Stephen Simon and Barnet Bain, US
- 2000 – Maly Milos by Jakub Pistecky, CA
  - Maaz by Christian Volckman, FR
- 2001 – Le Processus by Xavier de l’Hermuzičre and Philippe Grammaticopoulos, FR
- 2002 – Monsters, Inc. by Andrew Stanton, Lee Unkrich, Pete Docter and David Silverman, US
- 2003 – Tim Tom by Romain Segaud and Cristel Pougeoise, FR
- 2004 – Ryan by Chris Landreth, US.
  - Distinction: Parenthèse from Francois Blondeau, Thibault Deloof, Jérémie Droulers, Christophe Stampe, France
  - Distinction: Birthday Boy from Sejong Park, Australia
- 2005 – Fallen Art by Tomek Baginski, Poland.
  - Distinction: The Incredibles from Pixar
  - Distinction: City Paradise by Gaëlle Denis (UK), Passion Pictures (FR)
- 2006 – 458nm by Jan Bitzer, Ilija Brunck, Tom Weber, Filmakademie Baden-Württemberg, Germany.
  - Distinction: Kein platz Für Gerold by Daniel Nocke / Studio Film Bilder, Germany
  - Distinction: Negadon, the monster from Mars, by Jun Awazu, Japan
- 2007 – Codehunters by Ben Hibon, (UK)
- 2008 – Madame Tutli-Putli by Chris Lavis, Maciek Szczerbowski. (Directors), Jason Walker (Special Visual Effects), National Film Board of Canada
- 2009 – HA'Aki by Iriz Pääbo, National Film Board of Canada
- 2010 – Nuit Blanche by Arev Manoukian (Director), Marc-André Gray (Visual Effects Artist), National Film Board of Canada
- 2011 – Metachaos by Alessandro Bavari (IT)
- 2012 – Rear Window Loop by Jeff Desom (LU)
  - Distinction: Caldera by Evan Viera/Orchid Animation (US)
  - Distinction: Rise of the Planet of the Apes by Weta Digital (NZ)/Twentieth Century Fox
- 2013 – Forms by Quayola (IT), Memo Akten (TR)
  - Distinction: Duku Spacemarines by La Mécanique du Plastique (FR)
  - Distinction: Oh Willy… by Emma De Swaef (BE), Marc James Roels (BE) / Beast Animation
- 2014 – Walking City by Universal Everything (UK)
- 2015 – Temps Mort by Alex Verhaest (BE)
  - Distinction: Bär by Pascal Floerks (DE)
  - Distinction: The Reflection of Power by Mihai Grecu (RO/HU)

=== Digital Music ===
This category is for those making electronic music and sound art through digital means. From 1987 to 1998 the category was known as "Computer music." Two Golden Nicas were awarded in 1987, and none in 1990. There was no Computer Music category in 1991.

- 1987 – Peter Gabriel and Jean-Claude Risset
- 1988 – Denis Smalley
- 1989 – Kaija Saariaho
- 1990 – None
- 1991 – Category omitted
- 1992 – Alejandro Viñao
- 1993 – Bernard Parmegiani
- 1994 – Ludger Brümmer
  - Distinction: Jonathan Impett
- 1995 – Trevor Wishart
- 1996 – Robert Normandeau
- 1997 – Matt Heckert
- 1998 – Peter Bosch and Simone Simons (joint award)
- 1999 – Come to Daddy by Aphex Twin (Richard D. James) and Chris Cunningham (joint award)
  - Distinction: Birthdays by Ikue Mori (JP)
  - Distinction: Mego (label), Hotel Paral.lel by Christian Fennesz, Seven Tons For Free by Peter Rehberg (a.k.a. Pita)
- 2000 – 20' to 2000 by Carsten Nicolai
  - Distinction: Minidisc by Gescom
  - Distinction: Outside the Circle of Fire by Chris Watson
- 2001 – Matrix by Ryoji Ikeda
- 2002 – Man'yo Wounded 2001 by Yasunao Tone
- 2003 – Ami Yoshida, Sachiko M and Utah Kawasaki (joint award)
- 2004 – Banlieue du Vide by Thomas Köner
- 2005 – TEO! A Sonic Sculpture by Maryanne Amacher
- 2006 – L'île ré-sonante by Éliane Radigue
- 2007 – Reverse-Simulation Music by Mashiro Miwa
- 2008 – Reactable by Sergi Jordà (ES), Martin Kaltenbrunner (AT), Günter Geiger (AT) and Marcos Alonso (ES)
- 2009 – Speeds of Time versions 1 and 2 by Bill Fontana (US)
- 2010 – rheo: 5 horizons by Ryoichi Kurokawa (JP)
- 2011 – Energy Field by Jana Winderen (NO)
- 2012 – "Crystal Sounds of a Synchrotron" by Jo Thomas (GB)
- 2013 – frequencies (a) by Nicolas Bernier (CA)
  - Distinction: SjQ++ by SjQ++ (JP)
  - Distinction: Borderlands Granular by Chris Carlson (US)
- 2015 – Chijikinkutsu by Nelo Akamatsu (JP)
  - Distinction: Drumming is an elastic concept by Josef Klammer (AT)
  - Distinction: Under Way by Douglas Henderson (DE)
- 2017 – Not Your World Music: Noise In South East Asia by Cedrik Fermont (CD/BE/DE), Dimitri della Faille (BE/CA)
  - Distinction: Gamelan Wizard by Lucas Abela (AU), Wukir Suryadi (ID) und Rully Shabara (ID)
  - Distinction: Corpus Nil by Marco Donnarumma (DE/IT)

=== Hybrid art ===
- 2007 – Symbiotica
- 2008 – Pollstream – Nuage Vert by Helen Evans (FR/UK) and Heiko Hansen (FR/DE) HeHe
- 2009 – Natural History of the Enigma by Eduardo Kac (US)
- 2010 – Ear on Arm by Stelarc (AU)
- 2011 – May the Horse Live in me by Art Orienté Objet (FR)
- 2012 – Bacterial radio by Joe Davis (US)
  - Distinction: Free Universal Construction Kit (F.U.C.K.) by Golan Levin and Shawn Sims
- 2013 – Cosmopolitan Chicken Project, Koen Vanmechelen (BE)
- 2015 – Plantas Autofotosintéticas, Gilberto Esparza (MX)
- 2017 – K-9_topology, Maja Smrekar (SI)

=== [the next idea] voestalpine Art and Technology Grant ===
- 2009 – Open_Sailing by Open_Sailing Crew led by Cesar Harada.
- 2010 – Hostage by [Frederik De Wilde].
- 2011 – Choke Point Project by P2P Foundation (NL).
- 2012 – qaul.net – tools for the next revolution by Christoph Wachter & Mathias Jud
- 2013 – Hyperform by Marcelo Coelho (BR), Skylar Tibbits (US), Natan Linder (IL), Yoav Reaches (IL)
  - Honorary Mentions: GravityLight by Martin Riddiford (GB), Jim Reeves (GB)
- 2014 – BlindMaps by Markus Schmeiduch, Andrew Spitz and Ruben van der Vleuten
- 2015 – SOYA C(O)U(L)TURE by XXLab (ID) – Irene Agrivina Widyaningrum, Asa Rahmana, Ratna Djuwita, Eka Jayani Ayuningtias, Atinna Rizqiana

=== Interactive Art ===
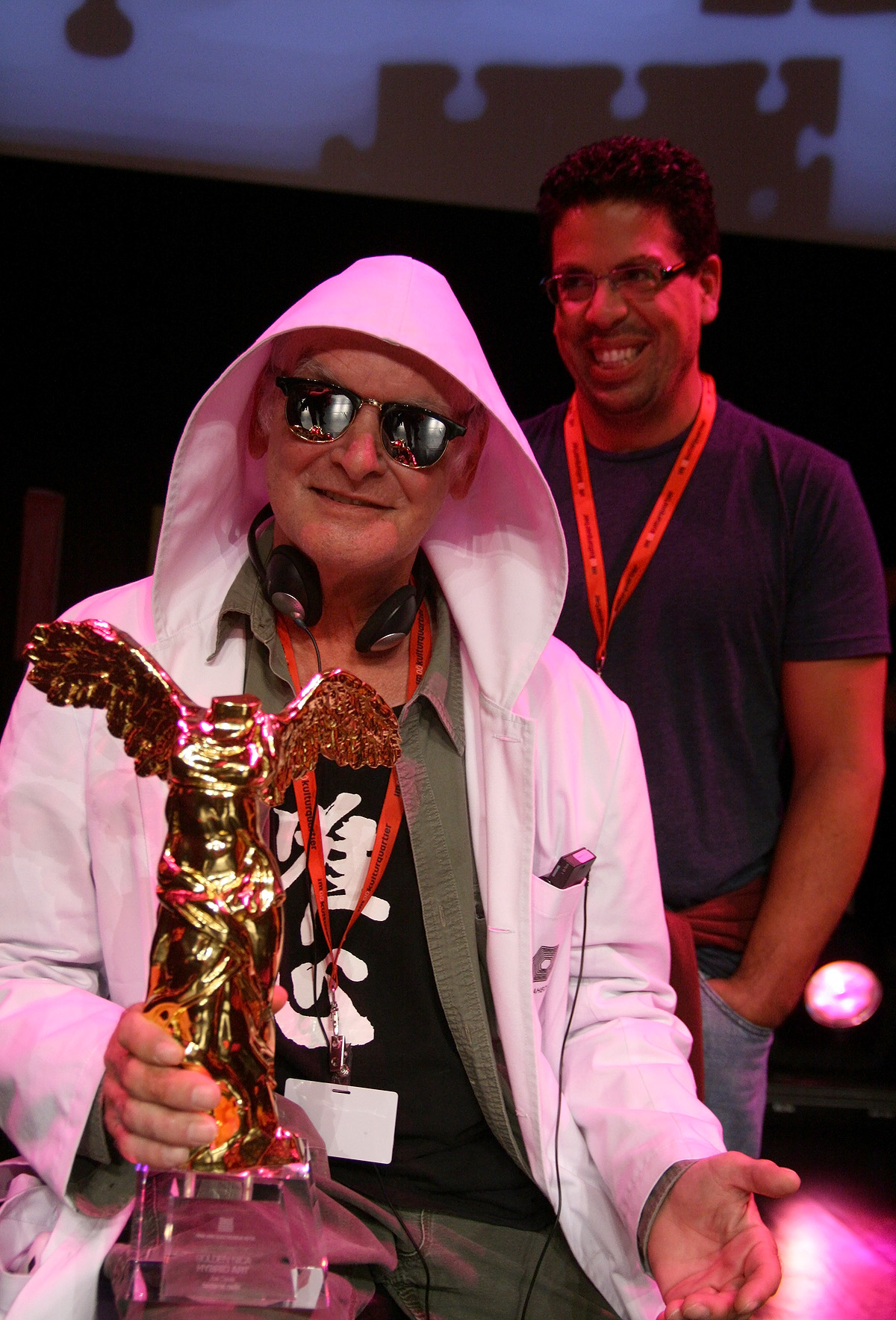
Joe Davis at the Prix Ars Electronica 2012

Prizes in the category of interactive art have been awarded since 1990. This category applies to many categories of works, including installations and performances, characterized by audience participation, virtual reality, multimedia and telecommunication.

- 1990 – Videoplace installation by Myron Krueger
- 1991 – Think About the People Now project by Paul Sermon
- 1992 – Home of the Brain installation by Monika Fleischmann and Wolfgang Strauss
- 1993 – Simulationsraum-Mosaik mobiler Datenklänge (smdk) installation by Knowbotic Research
- 1994 – A-Volve environment by Christa Sommerer and Laurent Mignonneau
- 1995 – the concept of Hypertext, attributed to Tim Berners-Lee
- 1996 – Global Interior Project installation by Masaki Fujihata
- 1997 – Music Plays Images X Images Play Music concert by Ryuichi Sakamoto and Toshio Iwai
- 1998 – World Skin, a Photo Safari in the Land of War installation by Jean-Baptiste Barrière and Maurice Benayoun
- 1999 – Difference Engine #3 by construct and Lynn Hershman
- 2000 – Vectorial Elevation, Relational Architecture #4 installation by Rafael Lozano-Hemmer
- 2001 – polar installation by Carsten Nicolai and Marko Peljhan
- 2002 – n-cha(n)t installation by David Rokeby
- 2003 – Can You See Me Now? participatory game by Blast Theory and Mixed Reality Lab
- 2004 – Listening Post installation by Ben Rubin and Mark Hansen
- 2005 – MILKproject installation and project by Esther Polak, Ieva Auzina and RIXC – Riga Centre for New Media Culture
- 2006 – The Messenger installation by Paul DeMarinis
- 2007 – Park View Hotel installation by Ashok Sukumaran
- 2008 – Image Fulgurator by Julius von Bismarck (Germany)
- 2009 – Nemo Observatorium by Laurence Malstaf (Belgium)
- 2010 – The Eyewriter by Zachary Lieberman, Evan Roth, James Powderly, Theo Watson, Chris Sugrue, Tempt1
- 2011 – Newstweek by Julian Oliver (NZ) and Danja Vasiliev (RU)
- 2012 – Memopol-2 by Timo Toots (EE)
- 2013 – Pendulum Choir By Michel Décosterd (CH), André Décosterd (CH)
  - Distinction – Rain Room by rAndom International (GB)
  - Distinction – Voices of Aliveness by Masaki Fujihata (JP)
- 2014 – Loophole for All by Paolo Cirio(IT)
- 2016 – Can you hear me? by Mathias Jud(DE), Christoph Wachter (CH)

=== Internet-related categories ===
In the categories "World Wide Web" (1995–96) and ".net" (1997–2000), interesting web-based projects were awarded, based on criteria like web-specificity, community-orientation, identity and interactivity. In 2001, the category became broader under the new name "Net Vision / Net Excellence", with rewards for innovation in the online medium.

==== World Wide Web ====
- 1995 – Idea Futures by Robin Hanson
- 1996 – Digital Hijack by etoy
  - Second prizes: HyGrid by SITO and Journey as an exile

==== .net ====
- 1997 – Sensorium by Taos Project
- 1998 – IO_Dencies Questioning Urbanity by Knowbotic Research
- 1999 – Linux by Linus Torvalds
- 2000 – In the Beginning... Was the Command Line (excerpts) by Neal Stephenson

==== Net Vision / Net Excellence ====
- 2001 – Banja by Team cHmAn and "PrayStation" by Joshua Davis
- 2002 – Carnivore by Radical Software Group and "They Rule" by Josh On and Futurefarmers
- 2003 – Habbo Hotel and Noderunner by Yury Gitman and Carlos J. Gomez de Llarena
- 2004 – Creative Commons
- 2005 – Processing by Benjamin Fry, Casey Reas and the Processing community
- 2006 – The Road Movie by exonemo

=== Digital Communities ===
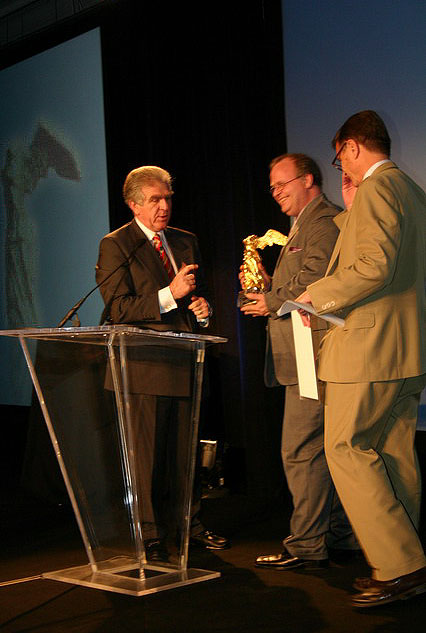
Danny Wool, representing Wikipedia, receives a 2004 Golden Nica.

A category begun in 2004 with support from SAP (and a separate ceremony in New York City two months before the main Ars Electronica ceremony) to celebrate the 25th birthday of Ars Electronica. Two Golden Nicas were awarded.

- 2004 – Wikipedia and The World Starts With Me
  - Distinction:
    - Krebs-Kompass
    - Open-Clothes
- 2005 – Akshaya, an information technology development program in India
  - Distinction: Free Software Foundation (USA) and Telestreet – NewGlobalVision (Italy)
- 2006 – canal*ACCESSIBLE
  - Distinction:
    - Codecheck (Roman Bleichenbacher CH)
    - Proyecto Cyberela – Radio Telecentros (CEMINA)
  - Honorary Mentions:
    - Arduino (Arduino)
    - Charter97.org – News from Belarus
    - CodeTree
    - MetaReciclagem
    - Mountain Forum
    - Northfield.org
    - Pambazuka News (Fahamu
    - Semapedia
    - stencilboard.at (Stefan Eibelwimmer (AT), Günther Kolar (AT))
    - The Freecycle Network
    - The Organic City
    - UgaBYTES Initiative (UgaBYTES Initiative (UG))
- 2007 – Overmundo
- 2008 – 1 kg more
  - Distinction: PatientsLikeMe and Global Voices Online
- 2009 – HiperBarrio by Álvaro Ramírez and Gabriel Jaime Vanegas
  - Distinction:
    - piratbyran.org
    - wikileaks.org
  - Honorary Mentions:
    - hackmeeting.org
    - pad.ma
    - Maneno
    - femalepressure.net
    - metamute.org
    - ubu.com
    - canchas.org
    - feraltrade.org
    - flossmanuals.net
    - wikiartpedia.org
    - changemakers.net
    - vocesbolivianas.org
- 2010 – Chaos Computer Club
- 2011 – Fundacion Ciudadano Inteligente
  - Distinction:
    - Bentham Papers Transcription Initiative (Transcribe Bentham) (UK). See also the project's Transcription Desk
    - X_MSG
- 2012 – Syrian people know their way
- 2013 – El Campo de Cebada by El Campo de Cebada (ES)
  - Distinction: Refugees United by Christopher Mikkelsen (DK), David Mikkelsen (DK)
  - Distinction: Visualizing Palestine by Visualizing Palestine (PS)
- 2014 – Project Fumbaro Eastern Japan by Takeo Saijo (JP)

== See also ==
- List of computer-related awards
