= Hehe =

Hehe may refer to:

- HeHe (artists), an artist duo consisting of Helen Evans and Heiko Hansen
- Hehe people, an ethnic and linguistic group based in Tanzania
  - Hehe language, a Bantu language spoken by the Hehe people
- an onomatopoeia for laughter
