= Smrekar =

Smrekar is a surname. Notable people with the surname include:

- Andreja Smrekar (born 1967), Slovene cross-country skier
- Ermin Smrekar (1931–2016), Australian architect
- Maja Smrekar (born 1978), Slovenian artist
- Matija Smrekar (born 1989), Croatian footballer
- Robert Smrekar, Slovene table tennis player
- Suzanne Smrekar, American astronomer
