= SITO (artist collective) =

Online artist collective

SITO is an online artist collective which began in January 1993, making it one of the oldest Internet-based art organizations. It was started by Ed Stastny and has been maintained by Stastny and a group of volunteers and supporters.

From its beginning, SITO had a mission different from many established Internet art resources, in that rather than be an electronic journal of discussions or writings about art, it chose to be a repository for artwork in order to facilitate sharing and exposure. As this was the Internet pre-World Wide Web, SITO accomplished this by using anonymous FTP sites. Another important part of the SITO mission was to be open to all levels of artists, and at no cost. SITO was one of the earliest online galleries, and this showcase of artwork has become known as the Artchive.

Popular pronunciations of SITO are SEE-toe and SIT-oh. SITO was originally called OTIS, which was an acronym for "Operative Term is Stimulate". The title SITO is merely a reversal of OTIS and is not officially an acronym, though some playful expansions have been suggested by users of the site. One such expansion is "Still I Think OTIS", which has the distinction of containing a nested acronym.

== Collaborative projects ==
Another focus of SITO that soon developed was an active interest in art games and experimentation with collaborative art projects using the Internet as a means of communicating. The first few such projects dabbled in dividing digital canvases amongst several artists (e.g. Grid and Crosswire projects) or translating traditional art games such as exquisite corpse to the digital medium. These projects were in full swing by 1994 and were grouped together under the heading Synergy on SITO.

In 1996, the SITO Synergy project HyGrid was honored with a Prix Ars Electronica award. HyGrid is a twisting, looping, multi-dimensional maze of small panels of art which is built up by hundreds of artists. It is still active today. Gridcosm started in 1997 and proved even more popular with over 22000 contributions to its recursing collaborative collage and continues to grow daily.

== OTIS vs. SITO ==
SITO originally was announced as "The OTIS Project", with a subtitle of "The Operative Term is Stimulate", which is where the acronym OTIS came from. This mostly whimsical choice became the name of the project and, in mid-1995, became an unexpected problem. An art college in the United States named Otis was troubled by the fact that OTIS made use of the term "OTIS Gallery" and used the domain otis.org. They sent a cease-and-desist letter and various other threats. The collective discussed the situation and decided something so whimsical was hardly worth fussing over and elected to simply reverse the acronym, thus becoming SITO.

== See also ==
- Internet art
- Electronic art
- Digital art
