= Vanco =

Vanco may refer to:

== People ==
- Marcel Vanco (fr, de, it), French football player
- Marek Vančo (born 1989), Czech handball player
- Mark Vanco (born 1968), American designer and artist
- Vančo Micevski, Macedonian football player
- Vančo Stojanov (born 1977), Macedonian middle-distance runner
- Vančo Trajanov (born 1978), Macedonian football player
- Vančo Trajčev (born 1975), Macedonian football player
- Vančo Šontevski, Macedonian officer

== Other ==
- vancomycin, an antibiotic
- Vanco, a subsidiary of Global Cloud Xchange
