= Brian Reffin Smith =

British artist

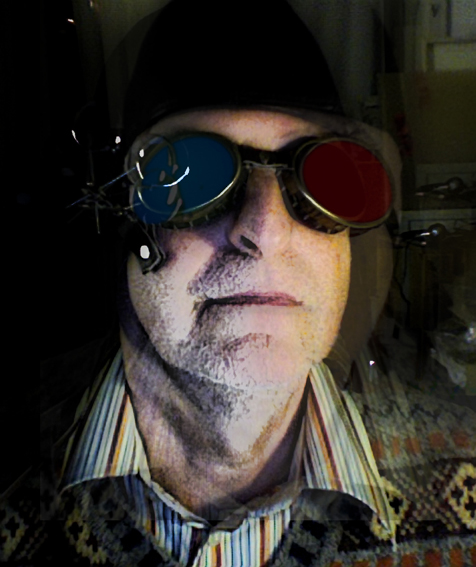
Smith during Zombie-Pataphysical Steampunk Show, Berlin, 2010

Brian Reffin Smith (born 1946) is an artist, writer, teacher and musician born in Sudbury, Suffolk, in the United Kingdom, who won the first-ever Prix Ars Electronica, the Golden Nica, in Linz, Austria, 1987. He lives in Berlin, Germany.

== Life ==
Brought up in Sileby, Leicestershire, Smith attended what was then an early comprehensive school, Humphrey Perkins School, at Barrow-upon-Soar. He studied metallurgy and metal physics at Brunel University (his sculptural use of metals' internal crystal structures featured in the BBC TV's science and technology programme Tomorrow's World) and later took a master's degree in the multi-disciplinary DDR (Department of Design Research) at the Royal College of Art, where he also was appointed a Research Fellow in 1979 and was later appointed College lecturer in computer-based art and design at the RCA from 1980 to 1984. He taught in the UK and France including most London art schools and French Écoles nationales, the Open University in the UK, and the Sorbonne and Arts et Métiers ParisTech in Paris. From 1986 to 2011 he was Professeur, art et informatique, at the École nationale supérieure d'art, Bourges, France.

Working with computers since the late 1960s, Smith was a pioneer of computer-based conceptual art, with the aim of trying to resist technological determinism and "state of the art" technology which might merely produce "state of the technology" art. He was a council member of IRAT, the London-based Institute for Research in Art and Technology. After showing interactive artworks at the Musée d'art Moderne de la Ville de Paris in 1983 he was invited by the French Ministry of Culture to intervene in art education, and was later appointed to a teaching post in the École nationale supérieure d'art (National Art School) in Bourges. In the UK in 1979, Smith wrote 'Jackson', one of the first digital painting programs, for the Research Machines 380Z computer, software which was distributed by the Ministry of Education and used in schools and elsewhere. He was involved on-screen and as a programme adviser in BBC TV's The Computer Programme in 1982 and the BBC published his art software for the BBC Micro.

In the Portsmouth Sinfonia orchestra, composed of players who could barely play their instruments, Smith sometimes played sixth clarinet, for example on the orchestra's World Tour, which started and ended one night in Cardiff, Wales.

Smith has been cited as among the most prolific letter-writers to the UK newspaper The Guardian, along with the celebrated Keith Flett and others.

Smith is a member of the OuPeinPo group of artists, Paris, France (OuPeinPo is to art what the OuLiPo is to literature); and Regent of the college of 'Pataphysics, Paris, France, holding the Chair of Catachemistry and Speculative (or sometimes 'Computational') Metallurgy. He regularly shows artworks and makes performances in the context of 'Pataphysics, often 'zombifying' the audience by wrapping their heads in lengths of bandage or toilet paper.

He is an advocate of including critique or reflection about artworks in the artworks themselves. In 1988 he showed "Artist/Critic" - two Amiga computers, not linked together, using text and a very little artificial intelligence to play the rôles of, respectively, an artist and a critic. Spectators/participants were invited to "help" one or the other text simulations by, for example, telling the artist what the critic said, or meant, and vice versa - the only way the two computers could communicate was by people typing to one what the other had said on its screen, often paraphrasing or adding their own thoughts, to which the critic, or artist, then responded. The concealed stratagem was that the simulations, that of artist and critic, were identical.

Areas of work, research, teaching and performance include ideas of Zombie and 'Pataphysics in art and elsewhere, and the détournement or "hijacking" of systems, mechanisms, programs, etc.from computing and other areas of science and technology, as well as cognitive psychology, to make conceptual art, for example. Smith claims to have become a Philosophical Zombie, and hence to have a deeper insight into problems of existence, artificial intelligence and art, after a botched heart operation in a Paris hospital when, instead of the more usual latex balloon being used to inflate a blocked artery during angioplasty, the team had recourse to a poisonous pufferfish (or fugu) which swells rapidly when a harmless voltage is applied to its tail. Smith has insisted, contrary to David Chalmers who invoked the idea of a philosophical zombie as an attempted refutation of physicalism, that it's "Zombies all the way down" (at the 5th International Conference on the Histories of Media Art, Science and Technology, Riga, Latvia, 2013.)

Exhibitions of conceptual art, installation art, performance art etc., often computer based, include "Art for Society", Whitechapel Gallery, London, 1979, "Electra", Musée d'Art Moderne de la Ville de Paris, 1983; Fondation Cartier, Paris, Pixim, 1988, La Villette, Paris, SIGGRAPH, 1988, (USA various and Moscow), Galerie Zwinger, Berlin, and Krammig & Pepper Contemporary, Berlin, 1986–, gallery A3, Moscow 1990, Muses Maschine Art Laboratory Galerie, Berlin, 2014–2015, DAM (Digital Arts Museum) Gallery, Berlin, 2016.

In addition to many books on computers for children and on computer-based arts for adults, Smith has broadcast and written widely on art and technology. He is a book and peer reviewer for Leonardo Journal. Smith contributed presentations to international conferences on Art, Design, Consciousness Studies, Media Histories and Digital Arts. In his writings on computers in the early 1980s (for example "Computers", Usborne Publishing Ltd, 1981) Smith appeared to predict in some detail smart devices such as the iPad and also the idea of using software held not in a computer but remotely, in the cloud, or elsewhere on the World Wide Web.

In his chapter in White Heat Cold Logic: British Computer Art 1960–1980, Smith wrote:

"There is a mine, a treasure trove, a hoard – I cannot emphasize this too strongly – of art ideas that emerged in the early decades of computer art that still have not remotely been explored. We know how this happens. The next big thing comes along and the Zeitgeist has its demands: things get left behind…"

This quotation inspired a symposium, "Ideas before their time", held at the British Computer Society in London in February 2010 at which Smith was the invited Keynote speaker.

Smith's "43 Dodgy Statements on Computer Art", described by Wired as "timeless", included ‘The sadness of most art is that it does not know its future. The sadness of computer art is that it does not know its past’ and ‘What would be pretentious or nonsensical if one said it oneself does not become more worthy when spoken by a computer-generated avatar’.
