= Gridcosm =

Collaborative art project

Creation of new level on Gridcosm. The image on the left is shrunk to become the center of a 3-by-3 grid, which other artists then complete the remaining eight squares of.

Gridcosm is a collaborative art project of the online art collective SITO, in which artists from around the world contribute images to a compounding series of graphical squares. Each level of Gridcosm is made up of nine square images arranged into a 3-by-3 grid. The middle image is a one-third size version of the previous level. Artists add images around that center image until a new 3-by-3 grid is completed, then that level itself shrinks and becomes the "seed" for the next level. This process creates an ever-expanding tunnel of images, the newest level a direct result of the previous level which is a result of the previous level and so on.

As of March 2018, 365 artists have contributed more than 4,260 levels (over 34,081 individual images) to the project.

== Gridcosm origins ==
The Gridcosm was started on March 30, 1997 by founder of SITO, Ed Stastny. The project built upon the ideas and experiences with previous SITO collaborative projects ("Synergy" projects), many of which were grid-based.

There have been many changes to the infrastructure of the Gridcosm since its 1997 inception.

- Process of generating new level changed from manual to automatic after the first few levels
- Software rewrite and move to database: mid-2000
- After 8 years, the background color of the Gridcosm page is changed from black to white: July 2005
- The ability for users to add "tags" to current and past levels: April 2006

Artist map of level 795. (Click for more info)

== Grid poem ==
In addition to the images in the gridcosm, there is a text element as well. When submitting a square to the grid, the user adds a text fragment which becomes associated with that square. Before submitting the text, the user can preview any text that comes before or after. This allows the user to choose words or fragments of sentences, allowing them to "blend" the text of the poem if they choose. Hyperlinks can also be added to the submitted text, although this is infrequent.

An example of a completed grid poem: "When you find yourself plummeting, please jump right in clawwing the age haw if sis first time with the gimp, not as smooth as pshop and it goes like this, tirelessly toiling with trumpets and fanfare." - Level 2819

Additionally, when a new level is created, there must be some "seed" of text for users to add on to. This text is created by an algorithm. In earlier levels of the Gridcosm, this "seed" of text was not as random as it is now. Various phrases such as "groblin attack" and "this should have been something better" were often used.

== Gridcosm Activity report ==
The details of the Gridcosm are captured with every piece added to the level and information about the work and the participants can be viewed using the Gridcosm Activity Report. A report can be viewed on the Gridcosm as a whole, with such information as the number of levels, the overall number of artists and much more.

There are also Individual artist reports which break down the contributions any given artist into categories such as number of pieces, average time between pieces, position popularity and much more.

== Significant Gridcosm firsts ==
- First use of coordinate as graphic element: User AUS, Level 1
- First use of old reservation box as graphic element: LEN, Level 10
- First use of old red reserved square as graphic element: KYT Level 24
- First use of grid location (Gridmap) as embedded graphic element: OED Level 49
- First appearance of Netscape broken image icon as graphic element: KYT Level 65
- First grid hog or hijack: SNY Level 66
- First two level grid hog or hijack: MKC Level 482/483
- First visual reference to the Brady Bunch: MRD Level 131
- Current Forum Debut: 2000-01-12 03:12:17

== "Fly-through" animation ==
The structure of the project lends itself to animated traversals, called "fly-throughs". These can take the form of a zoom-in, going into the past, or a zoom-out, moving toward the present day. Notably, Lenara Verle produced a high quality animation of the first 1000 levels of Gridcosm, which was scored with a soundtrack made by SITO artists. In 2005, this animation won an International Media Award.

== See also ==
- Collage
- Exquisite corpse
