= Knowbotic Research =

German-Swiss electronic art group

Knowbotic Research is a German-Swiss electronic art group, established in 1991. Its members are Yvonne Wilhelm, Christian Hübler and Alexander Tuchacek. They hold a professorship for Art and Media at the University of the Arts in Zürich.

== History ==
Yvonne Wilhelm (born 1962), Christian Huebler (born 1962), Alexander Tuchacek (born 1962) are based in Zürich Switzerland.

The Knowbotic Research group has experimented with the intersection of technology, information and knowledge, interface, immersive virtual reality and networked agency. In their work Simulation Mosaik Data Klaenge from 1993, they experimented with so called intelligent agent, applications which can conglomerate diaphanous information by themselves (also called knowbots) and intelligent virtual spaces (flexible information-environments distributed in electronic networks). Knowbotic Research KR+cF has regularly invited people from non-art fields to participate in their projects, such as scientists, philosophers and engineers, depending on the concept of each project. In partnership with the Academy of Media Arts Cologne, Knowbotic Research KR+cF has founded Membrane, a laboratory for media strategies, in 1995. In their more recent work, they created media-based projects that try to intervene in the (physical or digital) public domain.

Knowbotic is a coinage that combined "knowledge" with "robotic", meaning intellectual agent on the Internet. Knowbotic has developed some projects themed on an information environment and a computer interface. Since 1998, it has become more flexible, and with these main three of them, different members from various fields such as art, science, and philosophy, have joined in each program. In 1997, it worked with Japanese art group, Canon Art Lab, in Tokyo. This project aimed at revealing the function of the city by interacting between real and virtual world.

== Awards ==
Knowbotic Research has been exhibited widely and has received several prizes, including:

- Two Prix Ars Electronica Golden Nicas (in 1994 and 1998)
- The Claasen Prize for Media Art and Photography, Cologne
- The international ZKM Media-art award
- The August Seeling-Award of Wilhelm Lehmbruck Museum
