= Timo Toots =

Estonian artist

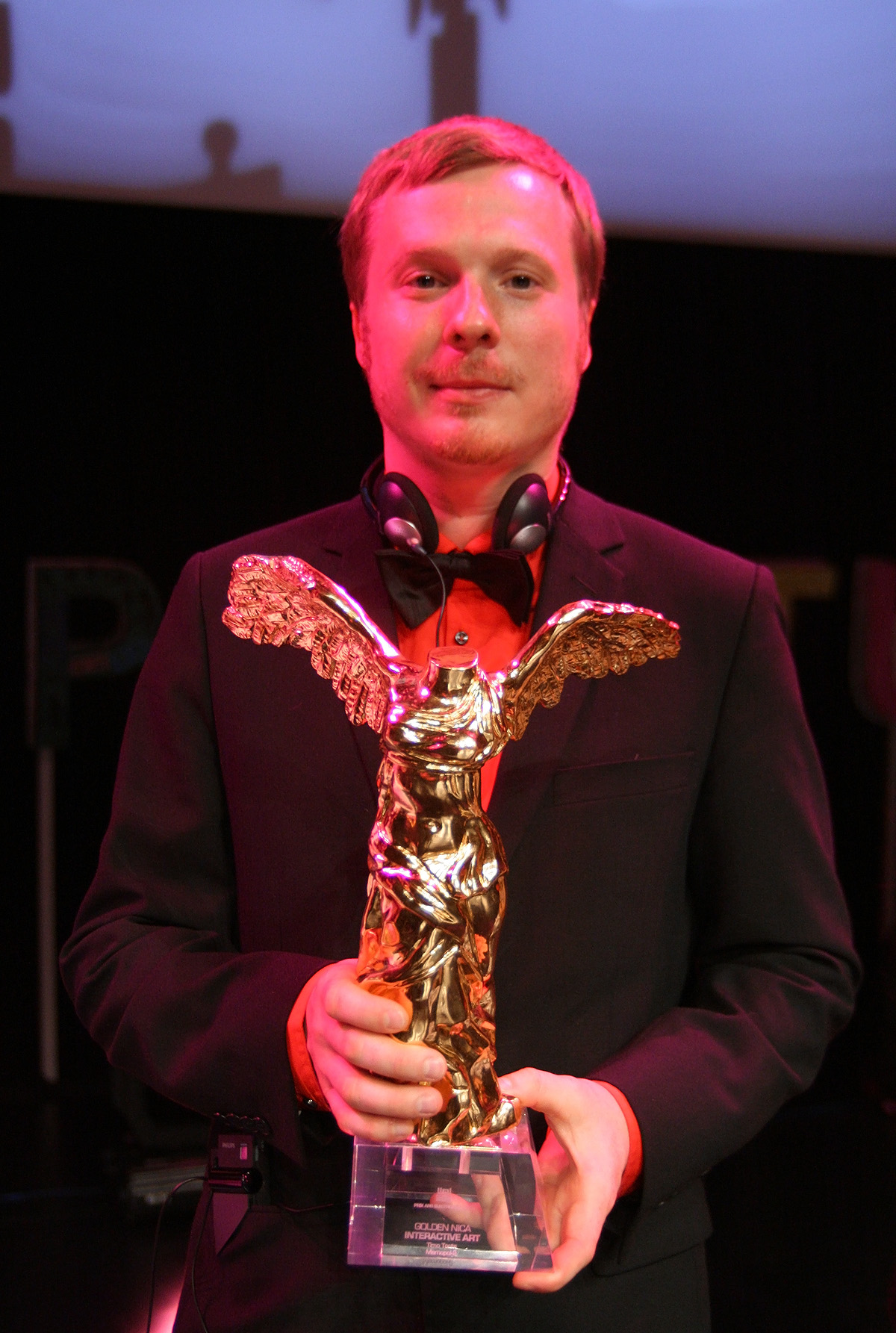
- Timo Toots in 2012
- Born: 1982 (age 43–44); Tartu, then part of Estonian SSR, Soviet Union
- Website: www.timo.ee

Timo Toots (born 15 September 1982, in Tartu) is an Estonian artist, mainly active in the field of interactive art and new media art. He is also the founder of project space Maajaam in Otepää.

== Biography ==
Before becoming active as an artist Toots studied at the University of Tartu and Estonian Academy of Arts. Besides a series of group exhibition participations he has done several solo exhibitions in Le Lieu Unique in Nantes, France (2014), Tartu Artist House, Memopolis at Edith-Russ-Haus, Oldenburg, Germany, Memopol-1 at Y-Gallery, Tartu, Estonia, and Memopol-1 at Hobusepea Gallery, Tallinn. KUMU Art Museum in Tallinn owns his artwork Soodevahe. Zentrum für Kunst und Medientechnologie in Karlsruhe owns his art work Media Bubble.

For Memopol Toots was awarded in 2012 with the Prix Ars Electronica in the section interactive art. In the same year he received an award from the Cultural Endowment of Estonia.

In 2013 he founded the project space Maajaam in Otepää, Estonia. This country side art space is focused on media art, site specific art, sound art runs an artist-in-residence program.
