= Jo Thomas =

British electronic composer and sound artist

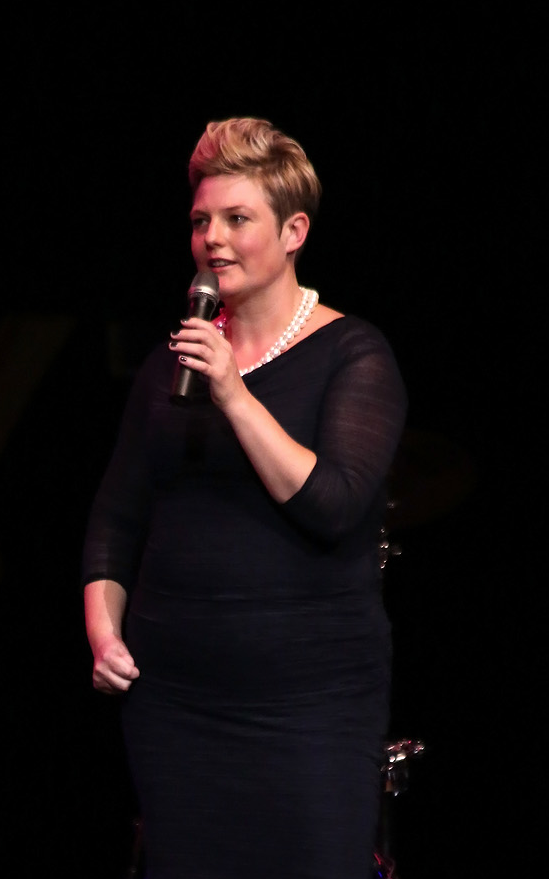
Jo Thomas in 2012 at Prix Ars Electronica, Linz, Austria

Jo Thomas (born 1972) is a composer, sound artist, producer, and performer of electronic music based in London. She works primarily with electronic sound, with a focus on fine detail and abstraction combining technological, biological and emotive thematic elements. Her work utilises a wide range of sound sources including field recordings, voice, glitch, and synthesised sounds from various sources, including her own self-built instruments.

She has released on record labels including Entr'acte, NMC and Holiday Records. Her work has been performed internationally, working with organisations in Italy, France, California, Brussels, Switzerland and Australia.

Thomas has performed alongside artists including Will Dutta, Lara Jones, Charles Hayward, Maria Chavez, Lee Gamble, Phill Niblock and Squarepusher. In 2012 she was awarded the Prix Ars Electronica Golden Nica prize in the category of Digital Musics and Sound for her work Crystal Sounds of a Synchrotron.

== Early life and education ==
Thomas was born in 1972 in Aberystwyth, Wales. She has a BMus and MMus from Bangor University and gained a PhD from City University, London in electro-acoustic composition in 2005.

== Career ==
In 2011 Thomas created the piece Crystal Sounds Of A Synchrotron using sounds recorded at Diamond Light Source, the UK's national synchrotron light source facility in Harwell, Oxfordshire. The work was composed directly from frequencies generated by the particle accelerator and also uses binaural recording from locations inside Diamond's experimental hall, storage ring and beamlines. She was awarded the 2012 Prix Ars Electronica Golden Nica prize in the category of Digital Musics and Sound Art for Crystal.

In 2015 Thomas was commissioned to create a large-scale sound installation as part of the 800th anniversary celebrations of Magna Carta. The resulting work Agna Rita was installed at The Collection museum in Lincoln for the Frequency Festival of Digital Culture. The work combines musical and sonic elements and uses the frequency, rhythm and text from Magna Carta, exploring a union of medieval modalities and digital contemporary artefacts.

The 2017 documentary film Little Tsunamis directed by Toby Clarkson features Thomas as one of three sound artists alongside Chris Watson and Daniel Wilson.

In 2018 Thomas created a new commissioned work for the touring Synth Remix project (2018). The piece, titled Nature's Numbers, is based on the work of Daphne Oram and Delia Derbyshire at the BBC Radiophonic Workshop. The project made use of the 2016 realisation of Oram's Mini-Oramics machine, created by Tom Richards, with Thomas as one of the composers chosen to pilot its use.

In 2020 Thomas was commissioned to create a new musical work In A Still Place to be played on sculptural sound installation Speaking Tubes by IOU Theatre, Halifax. The piece explores different states of stillness whilst acknowledging sometimes rapid change.

In 2007 she was commissioned by Ports of Call to compose an audio trail inspired by the history of Silvertown, London. She runs a soundwalking project in North London with her own label Soft Apple.

== Album Discography ==
- 2010 Alpha (Entr'acte)
- 2012 Nature of Habit (Entr'acte)
- 2013 Mermaids (Holiday Records)
- 2015 Sunshine Over Nimbus (Ptyx)
- 2015 Agna Rita (Occupied Silence)
- 2017 Random Feathers (Soft Apple)
- 2017 Agna Rita (Soft Apple)
