= Paul Brown (artist) =

British digital artist based in Australia

- Born: 23 October 1947 (age 78); Halifax, West Yorkshire, England
- Education: Burnage Grammar School (Manchester); Manchester College of Art and Design; Liverpool Polytechnic; Slade School of Fine Art
- Known for: Digital art
- Awards: Fremantle Print Award (1996); ACM SIGGRAPH Distinguished Artist Award (2023)
- Website: www.paul-brown.com

Paul Brown (born 23 October 1947) is an artist with an interest in the combination of art and technology, who has been based in England and Australia.

== Education ==
Brown was born in Halifax, West Yorkshire, in 1947 and educated at Burnage Grammar School in Manchester during 1959–1965. He attended Manchester College of Art and Design during 1965–1968. He studied for a BA degree in fine art (Sculpture) within the Faculty of Art & Design at Liverpool Polytechnic during 1974–1977, specialising in computing. From 1977 to 1979, he studied for a Higher Diploma in Fine Art (HDFA) degree at the Slade School of Fine Art, University College London.

== Career ==
Brown has specialised in art, science and technology since the late 1960s and in computational and generative art since the mid-1970s. His early work included creating large-scale lighting works for musicians and performance groups (such as Meredith Monk, Musica Elettronica Viva, Pink Floyd, etc.). He has exhibited internationally since the late 1960s, including permanent and temporary public artworks. He has participated in shows at venues including the Institute of Contemporary Arts, Tate, and Victoria and Albert Museum in London, UK; the Adelaide Festival in Adelaide, Australia; the ARCO International Contemporary Art Fair in Madrid, Spain, The Substation in Singapore; the Venice Biennale in Venice, Italy; and the National Academy of Sciences in Washington, D.C., US. His work is included in public, corporate, and private collections in Australia, Asia, Europe, Russia, and the US.

In 1984, Brown was the founding head of the UK National Centre for Computer Aided Art and Design at Middlesex University, where he founded one of the UK's first Masters programmes in Media Arts. After a two-year appointment as professor of art and technology at Mississippi State University, he moved to Australia in 1994 to head the multimedia unit at Griffith University. In 1996, he was the founding adjunct professor of communication design at Queensland University of Technology.

From 1992 to 1999, Brown edited fineArt forum, an Internet art magazine. During 1997–1999, he was chair of the management board of the Australian Network for Art Technology (ANAT). In 2005, he was elected chair of the Computer Arts Society (CAS), a BCS Specialist Group; he served in the same position again from 2008 to 2010. In 2023, CAS exhibited a retrospective of his work in London and Leicester, and his works are in the associated Computer Arts Archive.

During 2000–2001, Brown was a New Media Arts Fellow of the Australia Council, spending 2000 as an artist-in-residence at the Centre for Computational Neuroscience and Robotics (CCNR) based within the University of Sussex in Brighton, England. During 2002–2005, he was a visiting fellow in the School of History of Art, Film and Visual Media at Birkbeck College, University of London, where he worked on the CACHe (Computer Arts, Contexts, Histories, etc.) project. He also helped the Victoria and Albert Museum acquire the internationally significant digital art collection assembled by an American art historian and curator, Patric Prince. From 2005 to 2023, he was a visiting professor and artist-in-residence at the CCNR, Department of Informatics, at the University of Sussex. During 2010–2012, he was Synapse artist-in-residence at the Centre for Intelligent System Research, Deakin University, in Geelong, Australia, supported by the Australia Council for the Arts and the Australian Research Council.

== Awards ==
In 1996, Brown won the Fremantle Print Award. In 2023, he was awarded the ACM SIGGRAPH Distinguished Artist Award for Lifetime Achievement in Digital Art. His work has been shown at ACM SIGGRAPH art shows.

== Publications ==
- Brown, Paul; Gere, Charlie; Lambert, Nicholas; Mason, Catherine, eds. (2008). White Heat Cold Logic. MIT Press. ISBN 978-0-262-02653-6.
