= The World Starts with Me =

The World Starts With Me is a computer-based sex education and AIDS prevention program aimed at young Ugandans, developed and produced by the Butterfly Works Foundation and the World Population Foundation (a Dutch non-governmental organization) in association with Ugandan Schoolnet. It has so far reached children all around the globe and Kenyans have now joined in the learning process. Teenagers get to learn more about their bodies and sexually transmitted diseases. This helps in showing teenagers the consequences of having unprotected sex. In 2004, it won a Prix Ars Electronica Golden Nica for Digital Communities.
