= Mark Vanco =

American designer

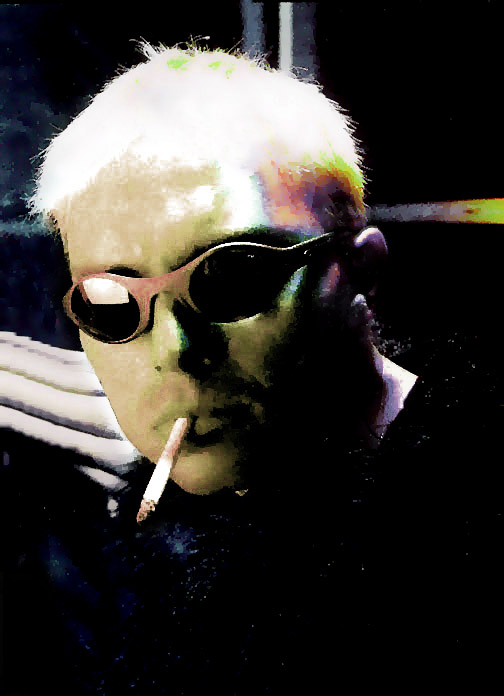
Mark Vanco

Mark Vanco (born October 13, 1968) is an American designer and artist, associated with the cyberpunk aesthetic. He is the creator of Rotor, a clothing company.

== Early life ==
Vanco was born in Columbus, Ohio, in the United States. His father was a designer and engineer who had been involved in the development of various products between the 1940s and 1960s, including pre-fabricated and solar-heated homes, plastic interlocking blocks and prosthetic limb designs for the United States military.

== Rotor ==
Rotor, Vanco's clothing company and the origin of his artist name, initially sold mail-order shirts and accessories via adverts placed in technology culture magazines. Rotor products were later sold in international boutiques.

In 1991, Rotor adverts started to appear in Mondo 2000, a San Francisco cult publication and predecessor of WIRED. The adverts featured Vanco's T-shirts, inspired by a mix of cyberpunk and Japanese consumer culture.

In 1994, Vanco moved to Chicago to work with Mike Saenz of the digital entertainment company Reactor Inc. Together they worked on the development of digital entertainment content including 3D films and ideas for what Vanco would eventually describe as "designer entertainment".

Between 1996 and 1998, Rotor was based in the downtown Los Angeles garment district on the border of Little Tokyo, in the same neighborhood as other street wear labels like Third Rail, Tribal and Twentyfive. Various music acts held after-parties and shows at the Rotor premises, including No Doubt and the Icelandic electro pop band Gus Gus.

In 1996 Vanco collaborated with California-based industrial designer Rob Bruce on a design for the first urban fashion wearable computer, the Rotor "Streetwearable". Vanco consulted with designer/engineer Adam Oranchak on the processor and interface design, which was handheld, with a chorded keyboard and micro PC located on the user's upper back. Rotor's early wearable computer was a predecessor to the mainstream fashion establishment interest in cyberculture, wearable technology and the "accessorization" of digital devices into everyone's wardrobe.

In 1997, Rotor was named one of "10 to Watch" by ASR (Action Sports Retailer), a sportswear industry magazine. Vanco was also invited to participate in various sponsored forums to discuss the future of fashion and technology in the United States and abroad.

Rotor folded in 1998, with Vanco leaving due to physical and financial limitations.

=== Rotor's influence ===
Rotor advertisements and editorial coverage appeared on the pages of national and international publications including the Los Angeles Times, Ray Gun, New York's Paper Magazine, Surface, URB, UHF as well as Interactif (France) and various Japanese street wear magazines.

Rotor adverts featured parody logos of gaming companies and franchises. Logos like Praystation, Nofriendo and Microshit were designed to be commentaries on videogame culture, technology tribalism, and a corporate media establishment. The logos influenced other artists including Joshua Davis, who adopted the moniker Praystation.

Rotor was profiled on CNN, the USA Network and various local TV stations, as a company merging fashion and technology during the period when the web was in its infancy and the concept of 'digital lifestyle' was new. The term has since entered common use, but Vanco was using it in the early and mid-nineties to describe Rotor.

Rotor fashion was also seen in music videos and/or used as stage gear by artists such as Front 242, Marilyn Manson, Rage Against the Machine, Front Line Assembly, Fear Factory, Chemlab and White Zombie.

== Magazine and fashion design ==
Throughout the 1990s, Vanco was an art director for magazines like Mike Manix's underground music publication Street Sounds, and the Los Angeles-based cyberpunk zine Nexus 6, run by movie industry executive and filmmaker Brian McNelis. Vanco also directed one issue of the Asian culture magazine Giant Robot, for his friend Eric Nakamura.

In 1996 Vanco designed custom jackets and other apparel for the electronic music label R&S Records in Ghent, Belgium, including custom-made outfits for DJs like Ken Iishi and CJ Bolland.

In 1997, Vanco created the logo as well as stage and promotional displays for the Belgian industrial artist Front 242. These designs are still used on merchandise and on tour material As of 2008.

Vanco has also worked occasionally as a brand design and new media integration consultant for the fashion industry.

== Games & CG animation ==
In 1998 Vanco art directed the PS1 videogame Speed Tribes and produced a comic of the same name for game developer Nemicron.

In 1999–2000 Vanco made a brief move to Brussels, Belgium to act as producer and art director for the computer animation production firm Imagination in Motion (IIM), rebranding the company for its entrance into the international marketplace. While at IIM, Vanco worked with clients including DreamWorks Pictures, Disney and Coca-Cola.

Vanco launched the animation consultancy bureau N1digital in 2001. The bureau worked together with companies across northern Europe including Grid VFX/Animation in Ghent, Belgium, and 583D in Frankfurt, Germany.

In 2001 Vanco developed a character-based, interactive strategy for Universal Music's Farmclub, a progressive television/web music program launched by Interscope Records' Jimmy Iovine and produced by Glenn Kaino. He produced and art directed custom CG animated characters and bumper animations for the show. The animation was created by the German CG production house 583D.

In late 2002, Vanco brokered and produced the computer graphics translation of the global cleaning icon, Mr. Clean for Procter & Gamble Europe. After finalizing the production deal, a subsequent nine territory European launch of the new 3D Mr. Clean was initiated, and the character has since been adopted for use in all of Proctor's domestic U.S. campaigns.

In 2005, Vanco acted as Web 2.0 design consultant and brand adviser for the Napster in Hollywood, California.

In 2006, he art directed the satellite broadcast music video network International Music Feed (IMF) in Los Angeles, California. IMF was wholly owned by Universal Music Group and designed to promote and market the label's American and international artists. Vanco was responsible for a wholesale network rebranding effort as well as the IMF campaign "War on Analog".

== Sources ==
- Dendel, Joanna and Stolz, Mary Kay."The Outer Limits" L.A. Times, September 25, 1997
- Ramirez, Mike."Front 242 – Patrick Codenys interview" Last Sigh, May 1997
