= Angie Bonino =

Peruvian artist

Angie Bonino (born 1974, in Lima) is an artist and graphic designer. She studied at the ENSABAP Escuela Nacional Superior Autónoma de Bellas Artes del Perú (National School of Fine Arts), and has a degree in Painting. She has done an artistic labor inside the disciplines of electronic arts, such as video art, video installation, net art, performance. She has one bipersonal and four individual exhibitions, the last one named Entremedios (2003).

She exhibited the video installation “Feet on the ground” (2000) at the “Interférences” Festival in Belfort, France (2000). In this work she uses 30 pneumatic spheres as a "screen" on which to project garbage-images of the Internet and TV. These spheres occupy the entire space of the installation and spectators must separate them to find their way out. She participated in "El Final del Eclipse" in Madrid, Spain in 2001, “Nueva/vista Videokunst aus Lateinamerika” at the Iffa-Galerie in Berlin (2003), and in “WRO 03, the tenth International Media-Art Biennial” at the WRO Centre for Media Art in Kraków, Poland.

She presented her videos “The Image” (2001), on the theme of war, and “The found Object” (2000), an analysis of “ready-made” television culture, at the World Wide Video Festival in Amsterdam, the Netherlands, in 2003. She participated in video workshops with Micky Kwuela (1999), Manuel Saiz (2000) and Jorge La Ferla (2000).

Through her work she makes a critical analysis of the electronic communication media, raising the new ethical dilemma connected with their use in the arts. For Bonino, the products of artistic and scientific creation that resound in global activities often contain a dual load that oscillates between profit or benefit and manipulation.
