= Reactable =

Electronic musical instrument

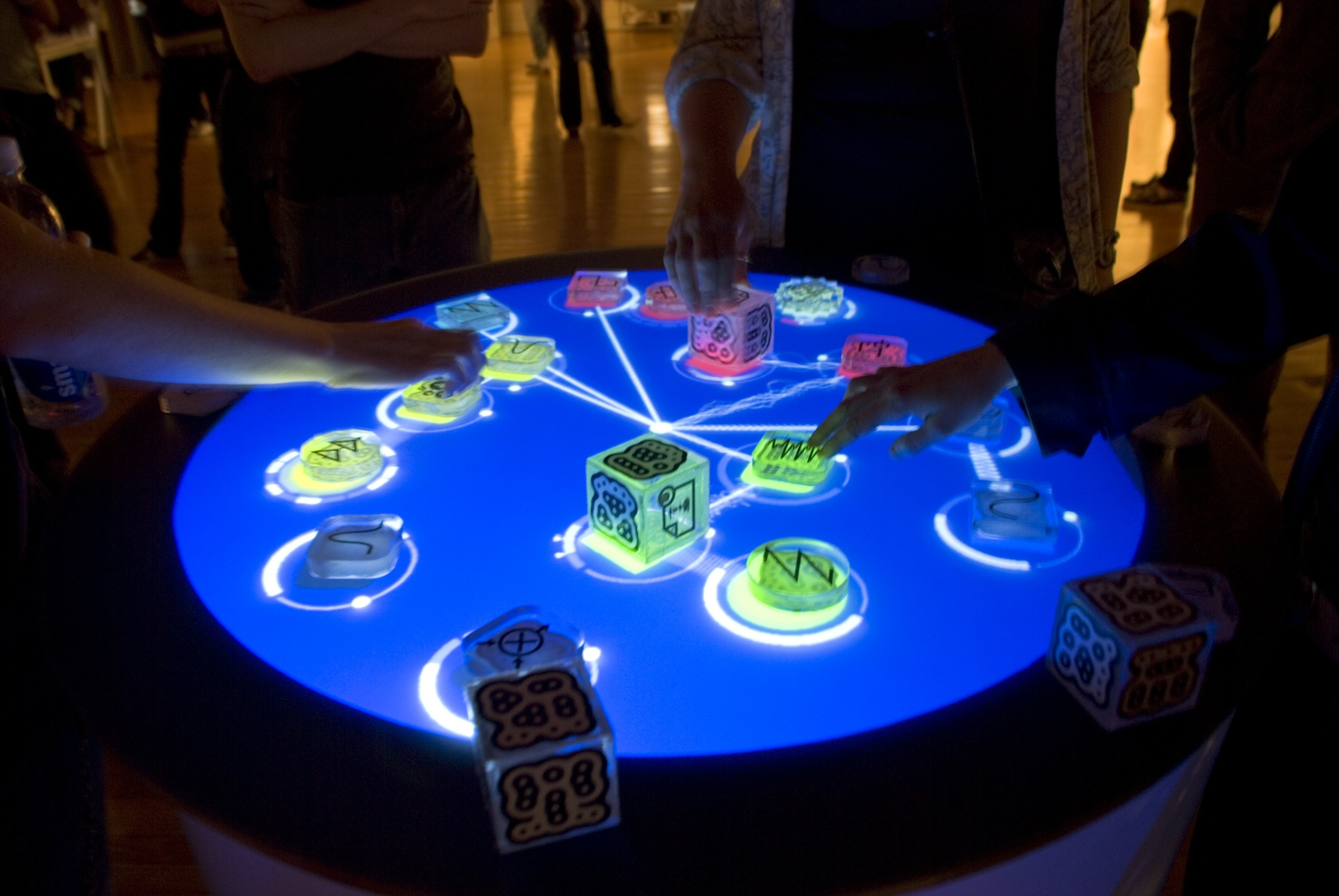
Reactable

The Reactable is an electronic musical instrument with a tabletop tangible user interface that was developed within the Music Technology Group at the Universitat Pompeu Fabra in Barcelona, Spain by Sergi Jordà, Marcos Alonso, Martin Kaltenbrunner and Günter Geiger.

In late 2010, a mobile version of the Reactable was released for iOS.

== Basic operation ==
The Reactable is a round translucent table, used in a darkened room, and appears as a backlit display. By placing blocks called tangibles on the table, and interfacing with the visual display via the tangibles or fingertips, a virtual modular synthesizer is operated, creating music or sound effects.

=== Tangibles ===
There are various types of tangibles representing different modules of an analog synthesizer. Audio frequency VCOs, LFOs, VCFs, and sequencers are some of the commonly used tangibles. There are also tangibles that affect other modules: one called radar is a periodic trigger, and another called tonalizer limits a VCO to the notes of a musical scale.

=== Using tangibles with the display ===
The table itself is the display. As a tangible is placed on the table, various animated symbols appear, such as waveforms, circles, circular grids, or sweeping lines. Some symbols merely show what the particular tangible is doing, others can be used by fingertip to control the respective module.

=== Example of operation ===
If a VCO tangible is placed on the table, a VCO module is added to the virtual synthesizer. In the display, a waveform will appear between the tangible and the "output" (a bright spot at the center of the table), and a circle appears around the tangible which allows fingertip control of the amplitude of the waveform. Additionally, in this example the tangible can be rotated by hand to change the frequency.

Placing a filter tangible between the VCO and the output causes the VCO's waveform to connect to the filter, and the filter waveform to connect to the output. If an LFO tangible is placed near the VCO, a waveform will then appear connecting those two, and the LFO will modulate the VCO.

== Structure ==
The main user interface consists of a translucent table. Underneath the table is a video camera, aimed at the underside of the table and inputting video to a personal computer. There is also a video projector under the table, also connected to the computer, projecting video onto the underside of the table top that can be seen from the upper side as well. There is an audio engine based on Pure Data and SuperCollider

Placed onto the table are the tangibles that have fiducials attached to their underside which are seen through the table by the camera. The fiducials are printed black-and-white images, consisting of circles and dots in varying patterns, optimized for use by reacTIVision. reacTIVision then uses the fiducials to understand the function of a particular tangible.

Most of the tangibles are flat, with one fiducial on the underside. Some other tangibles are cubes, with fiducials attached to several sides, allowing those tangibles to serve multiple functions.

Currently, there are two versions of the Reactable, Reactable Live! and the Reactable experience. Reactable Live is a smaller, more portable version designed for professional musicians. The Reactable experience is more like the original Reactable, and suited for installations in public spaces.

== reacTIVision ==
The live video stream received from a digital video camera is processed by the open-source computer vision software called reacTIVision, originally developed by Martin Kaltenbrunner and Ross Bencina for the Reactable project. reacTIVision detects cartesian and rotational placement of fiducials on the table surface, then emits the specially designed Open Sound Control based network protocol called TUIO, which communicates to the actual synthesizer and visualization software that outputs to the video projector. reacTIVision is also capable of multi-touch fingertip tracking.

== Presentations ==
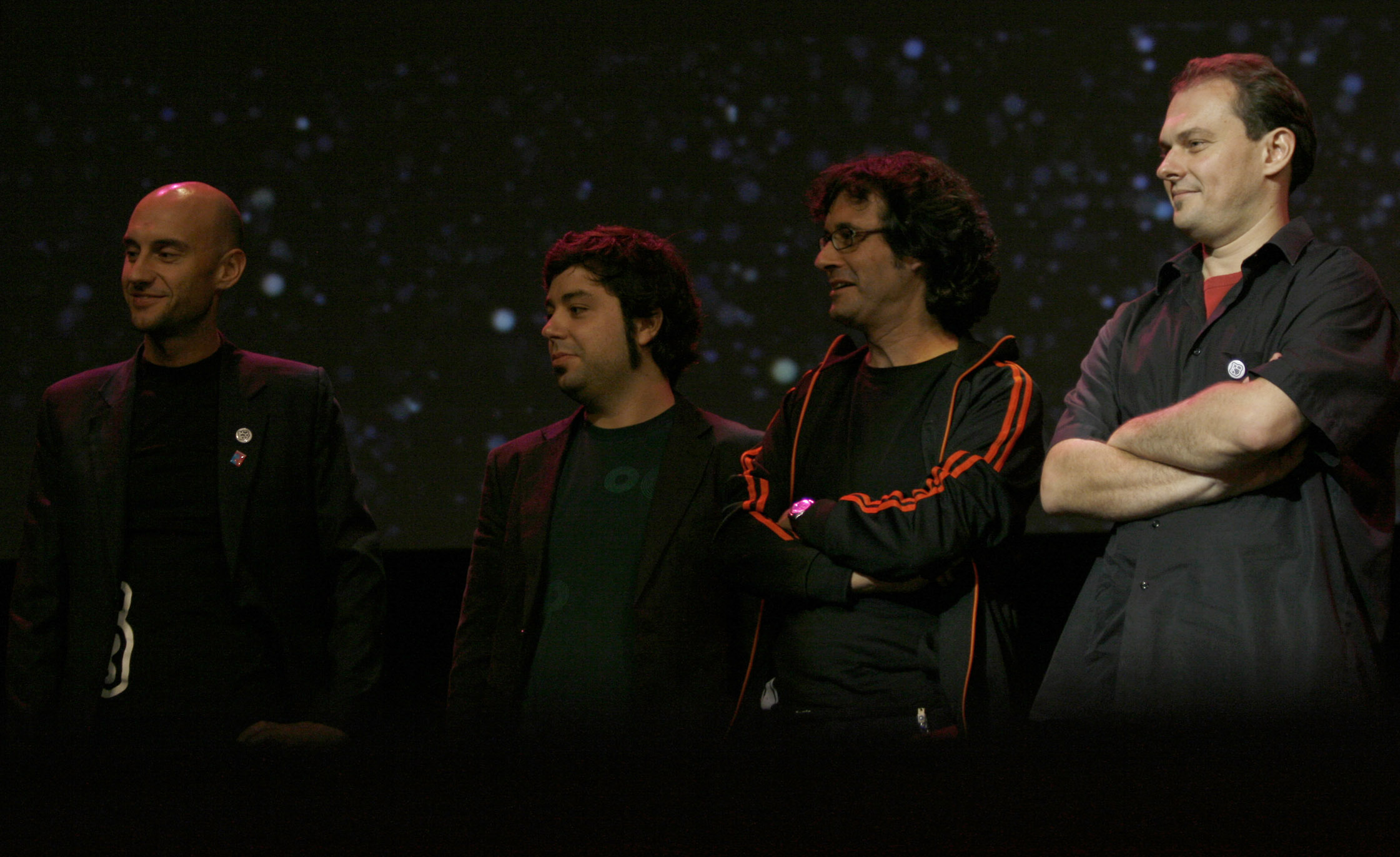
Günter Geiger, Marcos Alonso, Sergi Jordà and Martin Kaltenbrunner the Reactable team, receiving a Golden Nica at the Prix Ars Electronica 2008

The Reactable has been presented and performed at various festivals and conferences such as Ars Electronica, Sónar, NIME and SIGGRAPH. Over the years, the Reactable team has showcased more than 150 presentations and concerts in more than 30 countries around the world.

Icelandic singer Björk is perhaps the first musician outside of the select presentations and demonstrations to use a Reactable in live performance. Björk's 2007 world tour supporting her 2007 release Volta used the instrument in several songs including "Declare Independence"; Björk's live inaugural use of the instrument took place at the Coachella Valley Music and Arts Festival on April 27, 2007.

Recently splitting into two models, the Reactable Experience is on display in many exhibitions. Some of these include: INTECH, Discovery World (museum), Museum of Science and Industry, Sub Mix Pro, ZKM, and Game Science Center Berlin.

During the 2010 Winter Olympics in Vancouver, the Reactable was featured at the CODE festival. Throughout February, this event featured interactive media paired with sports and music.

In March 2010, a Reactable was installed at Discovery Place in Charlotte, North Carolina. as part of the 'Think it up' exhibition which opened to the public on May 1, 2010

From July 2, 2010, until October 1, 2010, a Reactable Experience was on display in the Science Gallery in Trinity College Dublin, Ireland, as part of their 'BioRhythm' exhibition.

There is Reactable at the Centre des sciences de Montréal in Montreal, Canada.

In 2011 the band Nero featured a Reactable in the music video of their single "Promises".

From March 2011 a Reactable is on display in Copernicus Science Centre, Warsaw, Poland. It is a part of "Re:Generation" exhibition and is available for use by visitors.

British band Coldplay used a Reactable during their performance of their song "Midnight" during iTunes Festival at SXSW on March 11, 2014.

== Awards ==
The Reactable received much attention from bloggers and was featured in major TV shows and popular magazines. Rolling Stone Magazine claimed that the Reactable was the hot instrument of 2007. The device has also received several awards including Prix Ars Electronica Golden Nica for Digital Musics, the MIDEM Hottest Music Biz Start-Up Award, and two D&AD Yellow Pencil Awards in 2008.

== See also ==
- Audiocubes
- Multi-touch
- Tenori-on
- Turntables
