= Yucef Merhi =

Venezuelan artist and poet (born 1977)

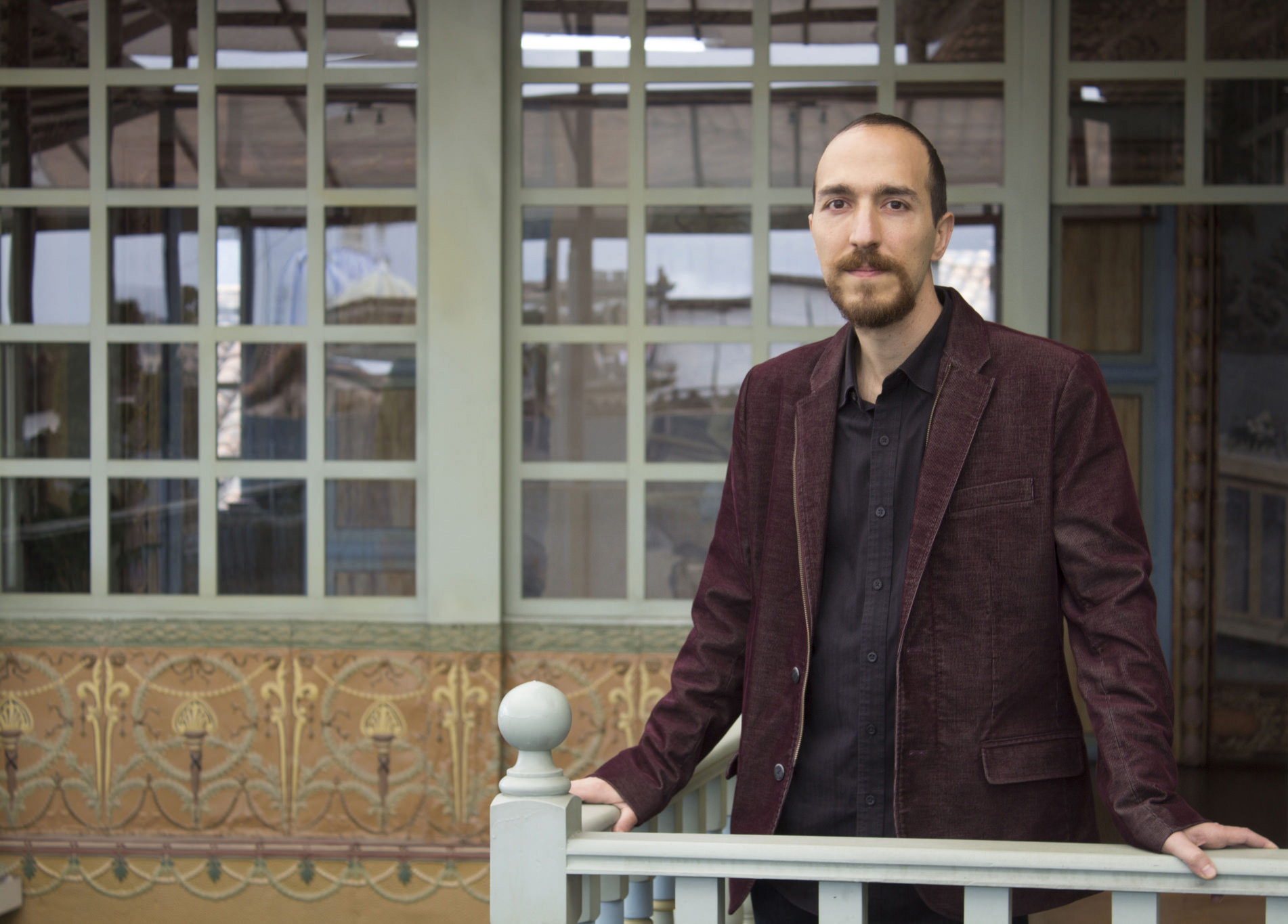
- Venezuelan artist, poet, and computer programmer
- Born: Yucef Merhi; February 8, 1977 (age 49); Caracas, Venezuela
- Education: Universidad Central de Venezuela; New School University; New York University (Master's in Interactive Telecommunications)
- Known for: Digital art, Poetry, Computer programming
- Notable work: Poetic Clock, Quetzalcoatl 2.0.1.2.
- Style: Interactive art, Digital poetry

Yucef Merhi (born February 8, 1977) is a Venezuelan artist, poet and computer programmer based in New York.

== Early life and education ==
Yucef Merhi was born in Caracas, Venezuela. He studied at Universidad Central de Venezuela, New School University, and holds a Master's in Interactive Telecommunications from New York University.

== Art career ==
Merhi has produced a variety of works that engage electronic circuits, computers, video game systems, touch screens, and other devices in the presentation of his written words. One example is Poetic Clock, a machine that converts time into poetry, generating 86,400 different poems daily. The resulting artworks expand the limitations of language and the traditional context of poetry.

His 2012 commissioned work for the Los Angeles County Museum of Art, California, Quetzalcoatl 2.0.1.2., was a web-based work that "aims to reveal the voice of Quetzalcoatl in the technological reality of 2012 A.D."

In 2025, Merhi's work was featured in 2025 Intertidal, the biennial digital art exhibition organized by the Pérez Art Museum Miami video art streaming platform, known as PAMMTV. 2025 Intertidal showcases the work of five South Florida artists working across digital media.

== Permanent collections ==
- Orange County Museum of Art, California
- Museum of Modern Art, New York
- National Art Gallery, Caracas
- Library of Congress, Washington DC
- Mednarodni Grafični Likovni Center MGLC, Ljubljana
- Museo Alejandro Otero, Caracas, Venezuela
- Museo de Arte Contemporáneo de Caracas, Venezuela
- Museo de Arte Valencia, Valencia
- Pérez Art Museum Miami, Florida

== Awards ==
In 2020, Merhi was awarded the MIT Open Documentary Lab Fellowship. He is also a recipient of a New York Foundation for the Arts in Digital/Electronic Arts.
