= Sergi Jordà =

Spanish artist (born 1961)

Sergi Jordà (born November 15, 1961) is a Catalan innovator, installation artist, digital musician and Associate Professor at the Music Technology Group, Universitat Pompeu Fabra in Barcelona. He is best known for directing the team that invented the Reactable. He is also a trained Physicist.

== Life and career ==
Sergi Jordà was born in Madrid, where his father was directing the film El Día de los Muertos (1961). His father was the award-winning Catalan film director and writer Joaquín Jordà.

Sergi Jordà graduated with a BSc in Fundamental Physics from the Universitat de Barcelona in 1987 while also completing music studies. He was an early adopter of computer programming devoted to live computer music, and one of the pioneers of this field in Spain. During the 1990s he conducted doctorate studies in Artificial Intelligence with the UNED and collaborated with renowned Catalan artists Marcel.lí Antúnez Roca or La Fura dels Baus on award-winning interactive installations (Joan the Meat Man and Epizoo, 1996), multimedia performances (Afasia, 2002), and applications for collaborative music creation over the Internet (FMOL, 1999–2002).

In 1999 he joined Dr Xavier Serra who was establishing the Music Technology Group at the Universitat Pompeu Fabra in Barcelona. Sergi Jordà's doctorate dissertation Digital Lutherie (Jordà, 2005) at UPF-MTG set the foundations for new kinds of musical computers for performance and improvisation, based on visual feedback and spatial multiplexion. Between 2003 and 2006, together with Günter Geiger, Martin Kaltenbrunner and Marcos Alonso, Sergi Jordà developed the Reactable: an electronic music instrument combining a tangible tabletop interface with principles derived from modular synthesizers such as those developed by Bob Moog in the early 1960s.

The Reactable was popularised by Björk, who incorporated it into her 2007 Volta Tour. It has since been performed extensively and is on display in numerous science and art centres worldwide, including the Museum of Science and Industry in Chicago, Discovery World in Milwaukee, Discovery Place in Charlotte, Montréal Science Centre, Science Centre Singapore, Museo Papalote del Niño in Mexico, Santralistanbul in Turkey, the ZKM in Germany or the INTECH centre in the UK. In October 2010 Reactable mobile launched for the iPhone and the iPad and within 2 weeks became top music application download in 20 countries.

== Awards ==
- Bourges, 1998
- Ciutat de Barcelona, 1999 and 2008
- SGAE 2000
- Möbius International, Beijing 2001
- Arco Electrónico, 1999 and 2001
- Europrix, 2002
- Hot Instrument of the Year, Rolling Stone Magazine, 2007 (for Reactable)
- MIDEM Hottest Music Biz Start-Up Award, 2008 (for Reactable Systems)
- Yellow Pencil, Product Design/Public Space, D&AD Design Awards, London, 2008 (for Reactable)
- Yellow pencil, Digital Installations, D&AD Design Awards, London, 2008 (for Reactable)
- Golden Nica, Prix Ars Electronica, 2008 (for Reactable)
- Innova, Barcelona, 2008 (for Reactable Systems)

== Selected publications ==
- Jordà, S. (1991). A Real-Time MIDI Composer and Interactive Improviser by Means of Feedback Systems. In Proceedings of the 1991 International Computer Music Conference. San Francisco, CA: International Computer Music Association, 463-466.
- Jordà, S. (1996). EPIZOO: Cruelty and Gratuitousness in Real Virtuality. In Proceedings of 5CYBERCONF, 5th International Conference on Cyberspace, Madrid, Spain.
- Jordà, S. (1999). Faust Music On Line (FMOL): An approach to Real-time Collective Composition on the Internet. Leonardo Music Journal, 9, 5-12.
- Jordà, S. & Wüst, O. (2001). FMOL: A System for Collaborative Music Composition Over the Web. In Proceedings of the 12th International Workshop on Database and Expert Systems Applications, 537-542.
- Jordà, S. (2001). New Musical Interfaces and New Music-making Paradigms. Proceedings of the New Interfaces for Musical Expression, NIME 2001.
- Jordà, S. (2002a). Afasia: the Ultimate Homeric One-man-multimedia-band. In Proceedings of the 2002 International Conference on New Interfaces for Musical Expression (NIME-02), Dublin, 132-137.
- Jordà, S. (2002b). FMOL: Toward User-Friendly, Sophisticated New Musical Instruments. Computer Music Journal, 26(3), 23-39.
- Jordà, S. (2002c). Improvising with Computers: A personal Survey (1989-2001). Journal of New Music Research, 31(1), 1-10.
- Jordà, S. (2003a). Sonigraphical Instruments From FMOL to the reacTable*.
- Jordà, S. (2003b). Interactive music systems for everyone exploring visual feedback as a way for creating more intuitive, efficient and learnable instruments. Proceedings of the New Interfaces for Musical Expression, NIME 2003."
- Jordà, S. (2004a). Digital Instruments and Players Part I - Efficiency and Apprenticeship. Proceedings of the New Interfaces for Musical Expression, NIME 2004."
- Jordà, S. (2004b). Digital Instruments and Players Part II - Diversity, Freedom and Control. International Computer Music Conference."
- Jordà, S. (2005a). Multi-user Instruments Models, Examples and Promises. Proceedings of the New Interfaces for Musical Expression, NIME 2005."
- Jordà, S. (2005b). Instruments and Players: Some thoughts on digital lutherie. Journal of New Music Research, 33(3), 1-21.
- Jordà, S., Kaltenbrunner, M., Geiger, G. & Bencina, R. (2005c) The reacTable*. Proceedings of the International Computer Music Conference (ICM05).
- Bencina, R., Kaltenbrunner, M. & Jordà, S. (2005d) Improved Topological Fiducial Tracking in the reacTIVision System. Proceedings of the IEEE International Workshop on Projector-Camera Systems.
- Jordà, S. & Alonso, M. (2006a). Mary had a little scoreTable* or the reacTable* goes melodic. In Proceedings of the 2006 Conference on New interfaces For Musical Expression (Paris, France, June 4–08, 2006). New Interfaces For Musical Expression. IRCAM — Centre Pompidou, Paris, France, 208-211.
- Jordà, S., Kaltenbrunner, M., Geiger, G. and Alonso, M. (2006b). The reacTable: a tangible tabletop musical instrument and collaborative workbench. ACM SIGGRAPH.
- Jordà, S., Geiger, G., Alonso, M. & Kaltenbrunner, M. (2007). The reacTable: exploring the synergy between live music performance and tabletop tangible interfaces. TEI '07: Proceedings of the 1st international conference on Tangible and embedded interaction, 139-146.19
- Jordà, S. (2008a). On stage: the reactable and other musical tangibles go real. Int. J. Arts and Technology, Vol. 1, Nos. 3/4, pp. 268–287.
- Gallardo, D., Julia, C.F. & Jordà, S. (2008b). TurTan: A tangible programming language for creative exploration. In 3rd IEEE International Workshop on Horizontal Interactive Human Computer Systems, 2008. TABLETOP 2008, pages 89–92.
- Julià, C. F. & Jordà, S. (2009). Songexplorer: a tabletop application for exploring large collections of songs. Proceedings of the International Society for Music Information Retrieval Conference (ISMIR’09), Kobe, Japan.
- Jordà, S., Julià, C.F. & Gallardo, D. (2010a). Interactive Surfaces an Tangibles, Crossroads. The ACM Magazine for Students, Vol 16(4), 21-28.
- Jordà, S., Hunter, S., Pla, P., Gallardo, D., Leithinger, D., Kaufman, H., Julià, C.F. & Kaltenbrunner, M. (2010b). Development strategies for tangible interaction on horizontal surfaces. Tangible Embedded and Embodied Interaction Conference, TEI’10.
- Gallardo, D. & Jordà, S. (2010c). Tangible jukebox: back to palpable music. In Proceedings of the Fourth international Conference on Tangible, Embedded, and Embodied interaction (Cambridge, Massachusetts, USA, January 24–27, 2010). TEI '10. ACM, New York, NY, 199-202.
