= Charlie Gere =

British academic

- Occupation: Academic
- Known for: Digital art history

Academic background
- Education: Middlesex University
- Thesis: The Computer as an Irrational Cabinet

Academic work
- Discipline: Cultural history Philosophy
- Sub-discipline: Cultural research
- Institutions: Birkbeck, University of London; Lancaster University
- Notable works: Digital Culture (Reaktion, 2002/2008); Art, Time and Technology: Histories of the Disappearing Body (Berg, 2005)

Charlie Gere is a British academic who is professor of media theory and history at The Lancaster Institute for the Contemporary Arts, The University of Lancaster and previously, director of research at the Institute for Cultural Research at The University of Lancaster. He is author of several books and articles on new media art, art and technology, continental philosophy and technology. His main research interest is in the cultural effects and meanings of technology and media, particularly in relation to post-conceptual art and philosophy.

Gere's PhD, ‘The Computer as an Irrational Cabinet’, was part practice-based and was from the Centre for Electronic Arts and the Department of Visual Culture, Middlesex University, and looked at the question of the ‘Virtual Museum’.

He was lecturer in digital art history in the School of History of Art, Film and Visual Media at Birkbeck College for seven years, where he ran the MA Digital Art History. He chairs the group Computers and the History of Art (CHArt) and is director of the AHRB-funded Computer Arts, Contexts, Histories etc. project at Birkbeck.

== Publications ==
=== Books ===
- Digital Culture (Reaktion, 2002) ISBN 978-1-86189-143-3; 2nd edition (Reaktion, 2008) ISBN 978-1-86189-388-8
- Art, Time and Technology: Histories of the Disappearing Body (Berg, 2005). ISBN 978-1-84520-135-7 This concerns artistic and theoretical responses to the increasing speed of technological development and operation, especially in terms of so-called ‘real-time’ digital technologies. It draws on the ideas of Jacques Derrida, Bernard Stiegler, Jean-François Lyotard and André Leroi-Gourhan, and looks at the work of Samuel Morse, Vincent van Gogh and Kasimir Malevich, among others.
- White Heat Cold Logic: British Computer Art 1960–1980 co-edited with Paul Brown, Catherine Mason and Nicholas Lambert (MIT Press, 2006)
- Special issue on Brains in Vats, Studies in History and Philosophy of Science Part C: Studies in History and Philosophy of Biological and Biomedical Sciences, co-edited with his sister Cathy Gere (2004)

=== Papers, chapters and extended reviews ===
These include:

- ‘Minicomputer Experimentalism in the United Kingdom from the 1950s to 1980’ in Hannah Higgins, & Douglas Kahn (Eds.), Mainframe experimentalism: Early digital computing in the experimental arts. Berkeley, CA: University of California Press (2012)
- ‘A Prehistory of Net.Art’ in Net.Art edited by Tom Corby (Swetz, 2006)
- ‘“I AM STILL ALIVE”: Derrida, Karawa and Telecommunications’ in White Cube/Blue Sky: Art Cultures in the Information Age edited by Michael Corris, Josephine Berry, Pauline Broekman and Simon Ford (forthcoming, Berg, 2007)
- ‘Art is not Terrorism’ Journal of Visual Communication (2004)
- ‘The technologies and politics of delusion: an interview with artist Rod Dickinson’, Studies in History and Philosophy of Science Part C: Studies in History and Philosophy of Biological and Biomedical Sciences (2004)
- ‘World Brains, Giant Brains and Brains in Vats’, Studies in History and Philosophy of Science Part C: Studies in History and Philosophy of Biological and Biomedical Sciences ( 2004)
- ‘Armagideon Time’, London from Punk to Blair, edited by Joe Kerr and Andrew Gibson (Reaktion, 2003)
- ‘Breaking the Time Barrier’, Culture and Organization, vol. 8, no 4 (2004)
- ‘Can Art History Go On Without A Body’ Culture Machine, 5 (2003)

== See also ==
- Computer art
- Digital art
- Electronic art
- Generative art
- New media art
- Systems art
