= Catherine Mason =

Australian-born art historian

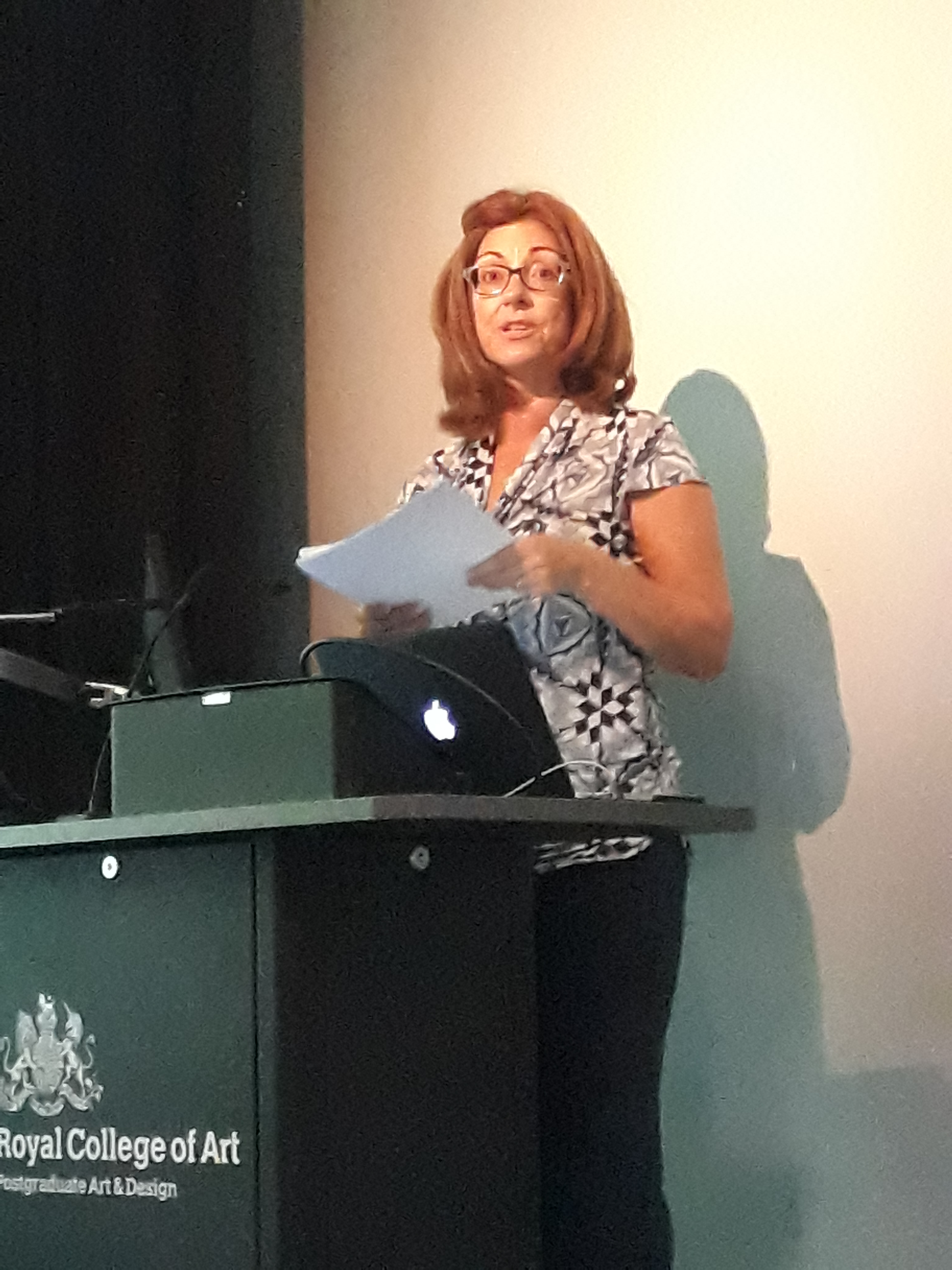
- Catherine Mason apeaking at Event Two, Royal College of Art (2019)
- Born: Australia
- Education: Birkbeck College; City University
- Occupation: Art historian
- Spouse: Keith Morris
- Writing career
- Period: Late 20th century
- Genres: Computer art, digital art

Catherine Mason (born in Australia) is an art historian and author who specialises in digital art, especially computer art.

== Biography ==
Mason was born in Australia, brought up in the United States, and educated in the United Kingdom.

In the late 1980s, Mason worked for an art dealer in Mayfair, London. In 1993, she received an undergraduate degree in the History of Art from Birkbeck College, University of London, followed by a master's degree in Museums & Gallery Management from City University, also in London. In the 1990s, Mason taught art appreciation courses in the Faculty for Continuing Education of Birkbeck College, the Workers Educational Association, and The Arts Society.

Mason's special interest is the history of computer art and digital art, beginning in 2002 when she joined an Arts & Humanities Research Council research project, CACHe (Computer Arts, Contexts, Histories, etc.), at Birkbeck College, This resulted in a co-edited book, White Heat Cold Logic, published in 2009.

Mason also assisted in the re-formation of the BCS Computer Arts Society. She also negotiated with the Victoria and Albert Museum (V&A) in London concerning donating an American collection of international computer art, the Patric Prince archive. This helped to develop the computer art collection at the V&A.

In 2006, Mason organized a screening and panel discussion of early British computer animation, Bits in Motion, at the National Film Theatre. In 2008, she authored A Computer in the Art Room, an exploration of the collaboration between art and cybernetics in Britain from the 1950s-80s, based on four years of research and interviews. During 2011–2014, she produced a monthly column concerning digital art for the BCS. In 2012, she discussed computer arts with John Wilson on the BBC Radio 4 programme Front Row. In 2017, she spoke about painting in the digital age on the TRT World television programme Showcase. She has advised on digital arts to organisations including The Art Fund, the BCS, Leonardo, SIGGRAPH, and a number of museums and galleries.

In 2018 Mason published an articleon the impact of the 1968 Cybernetic Serendipity exhibition, curated by Jasia Reichardt, and continues to explore how artists can use cybernetics as recently as 2023.

She married Keith Morris, a trustee of the Contemporary Art Society.

== Bibliography ==
- Mason, Catherine (2008). A Computer in the Art Room: The Origins of British Computer Arts 1950–80. JJG Publishing. ISBN 978-1-899163-89-2.
- Brown, Paul; Gere, Charlie; Lambert, Nicholas; Mason, Catherine, eds. (2009). White Heat Cold Logic: British Computer Art 1960–1980. MIT Press. ISBN 978-0262026536.
- Mason, Catherine, ed. (2024). Creative Simulations: George Mallen and the Early Computer Arts Society. Springer Series on Cultural Computing. Springer Nature. doi:10.1007/978-3-031-50620-8. ISBN 978-3-031-50619-2.
