= Paul Sermon =

British visual communication professor

Paul Sermon was born 23 March 1966, in Oxford, England. Since September 2013 he has worked as Professor of Visual Communication in the Faculty of Arts at the University of Brighton.

== Biography ==
Paul Sermon was born in Oxford, England in 1966. Studying for a B.A Hon's Fine Art Degree in the Newport School of Fine Art at Gwent College, under Professor Roy Ascott, he began to gain an interest and involve himself in Telematic art work. It was at Gwent College that he was first introduced to the possible ways that telecommunication networks and computer systems could be combined to create what became known as Telematic art.

Sermon then went on to receive a Post Graduate Degree in Fine Art at the University of Reading, specialising in Reading's history in art and computers. His final project for this degree was entitled "Think About the People Now". The piece incorporated hyper-media technology and computer based interactive narrative that explored a one-man protest that took place at the 1990 remembrance ceremony in London. The piece received a distinction and later that year, the Golden Nica Award from 1991's Prix Ars Electronica in Linz, Austria.

After this, in the spring of 1992, he was then invited to Helsinki to reproduce it as part of the Finnish MUU Media festival. He returned to Finland to make Telematic work for the Finnish Summer Exhibition at Kajaani Art Gallery in north Finland. This was where he created "Telematic Dreaming", which became the first of many internationally celebrated telepresence based installations over the next ten years. Using live video images and projections, "Telematic Dreaming" was shown in over twenty venues around the world and became known as a seminal piece of interactive, Telematic art. It won a Sparky Award at the Los Angeles Interactive Media Festival in 1995 and is permanently on show in the Wild Worlds Gallery at the Bradford Museum of Photography, Film and Television, Yorkshire, England.

Shortly afterwards, Sermon was invited to work as an artist-in-residence at the ZKM Centre of Art and Media Technology in Karlsruhe, Germany and this was where he created "Telematic Vision" for the ZKM MultiMediale Festival in November 1994. This piece is also continually shown worldwide including shows at the Millennium Dome in London, The San Francisco Art Institute and the ICC InterCommunication Centre in Tokyo, Japan.

Whilst still in Germany, Sermon took up an associate professorship in interactive media art at the HGB Academy of Visual Arts in Leipzig. Here he continued to produce more interactive installations such as 1996's "Telematic Encounter", a permanent gallery exhibition for the Ars Electronica Centre in Linz and the ZKM Media Museum in Karlsruhe called "The Tables Turned- A Telematic Scene on the Same Subject" in 1997, 1999's "A Body of Water" which was commissioned for "The Connected Cities" exhibition at the Wilhelm Lehmbruck Museum in Duisburg, that went on to get an honorary mention from the Prix Ars Electronica in 2000, and 2000's "There's no Simulation Like Home", which was a large scale installation commissioned for the Fabrica Gallery in Brighton by Brighton's Lighthouse Media Centre.

Between 1999 and 2000, Sermon worked as a guest professor for performance and environment at the University of Art and Industrial Design in Linz, Austria, before returning to England in 2000 to take up the post for professor of creative technology at the University of Salford in Manchester, working primarily in the field of researching into immersive and expanded Telematic environments.

=== Previous appointments ===
Although currently working as professor of visual communication at the University of Brighton, Paul Sermon started out as a part-time lecturer for art and technology at the University of Reading, where he gained his postgraduate degree, as well as a part-time lecturer for telematic arts at Gwent College of Higher Education between September 1989 and December 1992. He then took the role of artist-in-residence at the Institute for Visual Media in Karlsruhe, Germany in 1993 and a guest professor at the University of Linz Austria between 1998 and 2001.

== Telecommunication ==
From the beginning of the 1990s Paul Sermons research became practise based, in his preferred field of contemporary media arts which focused on the creative use of telecommunication technologies. Telecommunication is the transmission of messages that are communicated over long distances. Sermon had a unique way of using videoconference techniques; he used this in his development of a series of celebrated Telematic art installations. His installations have received international acclaim and have been commented on by a number of his peers from the same field. His research into telecommunications and his art installations have been widely exhibited throughout Europe, United States, East Asia and Australia. He has received multiple awards including:

- The first prize at the Interactive Media Festival Sparky Awards in Los Angeles 1994
- Prix Arts Electronic Golden Nica Award in Linz 1991 and runner up in 1993 and 2000
- Nominations for the World Technology Awards in San Francisco and the ZKM International Media Art Prize 2000 in Karlsruhe.

== Key productions ==
=== Telematic Vision ===
While he was still a student Sermon began to develop interactive installations. His main aim was to create an intimate set up, that would communicate over a distance and to develop open systems so other people would be able to participate in what he called the "greatest possible scope". In his next project he created "Telematic Vision" which involved two structures that are identical, but in two locations that are as far away from each other as wised and they are both connected by telephone. The structures consisted of two blue sofas, with a large monitor opposite and a smaller one on each side of the sofa. Video cameras were set up to record the events and the images that are filmed are sent to a video mixer, they were then mixed together and transmitted on to the large monitor screen. Once the video was transmitted, images from live television programmes were played in the background. Person A and Person B would then sit on the sofa both being in different locations, when they would look at the large television monitor they would see themselves sitting next to each other with the television programme image in the background. This is what he called an "Outer Body Experience". The two people were able to interact with each other through mime and gesture and they find themselves in a virtual space situation even though they have distance between them. He used the sofas and television to provoke the everyday situation, of passive television consumers. The people sitting on the sofas immediately become performers, to the general public who are sat around them.

=== Telematic Dreaming ===
Telematic Dreaming was originally created as a commission for the exhibition that is held every summer by the Finnish Ministry of Culture in Kajaani and supported by Telecom Finland in 1992. The Installation was also performed at the National Taiwan Museum of Fine Arts in Taichung July 2 – August 24, 2005, where it was part of a seven interactive installation piece. This was Paul Sermons installation that became a major reworking, of a previous project he had been working on. Through the reworking of this project, it was developed and site specifically researched to create a video that contained the creation of interactive video sequences, with post production that took place in Taichung.

The theme and title of the piece came from Jean Baudrillard's essay "The Ecstasy of Communication" that talks about the notion of "home". To describe his installation Sermon looked at another one of Baudrillard's essays, and found the starting point of Telematic Dreaming. The installation existed within the digital telephone network of the ISDN. Two separate interfaces were created and put into two separate locations, were they function as customized video conference systems. In the two locations two double beds are placed, one in an illuminated space and one in a dark space. The bed that is in the illuminated space, has a camera directly placed above and records person A and the bed which is then sent as an image, to a projector that is directly placed above the second bed in the dark location. The live image is projected down onto the bed with Person B also in the image. Another camera located at the side of the projector screen, this camera sends a live image of the projection of Person A along with person B who is also in the image, to a variety of monitors that are located in the illuminated area and around the bed. This image that is created is called a "telepresent" image, what is presented on the monitor is a mirror, which reflects a person within another person's reflection. Sermons installation plays with ambiguous connotations, which represent a telepresent projection surface that appears on a bed. In the complete ISDN installation, psychological complexity is derived from the main object (the bed) and is then dissolved into the technology and geographical distance that is involved in the making of the installation. He wanted the user to feel the sense of existing outside of their own space, whilst around them a sense of touch is created that is very real and this is enhanced with the use of the bed and the senses beginning to shift in the Telematic space. The user is within a Telematic body and within this body it is controlled by a voyeurism of itself. When the body is caused to interact in the installation, the effects of this determines the time and space of the body and this can be extended through the ISDN network the body can then travel at the speed of light. Within Telematic Dreaming the user can exchange their tactical senses and swap their sense of touch, with the sense of sight by replacing their hands with their eyes.

=== The Teleporter Zone ===
The Teleporter Zone was one of the five artworks that were permanently incorporated, in the outpatients waiting area in Evelina Children's Hospital at St. Thomas in London which opened in October 2005. The piece was designed by Hopkins Architects and developed by Healthcare strategists from the group Rawlinson Kelly Whittlestone. The hospital proclaimed the project as the "UKs foremost and innovative NHS projects. The Teleporter Zone was created for children, to interact and perform in a virtual environment, whilst at the same time it would distract them and their families from the stress and worry that is caused from being in hospital. A wall was made in an S-shaped curve, were two children would sit on each side and not be able to see each other. Video monitors were placed around the wall, and they displayed both patients sitting next to each other but an animated background that was created by a computer. Once this image was created and displayed on the screen, it encouraged and triggered the communication of the participants, and it relocated the children within new and exciting "telepresent environments" i.e. a doll's house or an aeroplane. This installation allowed the patients to be transported from the hospital to a different location, which is what Paul Sermon wanted to create to help children take their mind of being in hospital and to let them interact in a different environment. This was his first telematic installation that was specifically designed for children in hospital.

=== Headroom ===
In 2006 Paul Sermon was awarded the Taiwan Visiting Arts Fellowship award, a joint initiative programme between Visiting Arts, the Council for Cultural Affairs Taiwan, British Council Taiwan and Arts Council England. It aims to establish an exchange between artists from Taiwan who are associated with contemporary arts practice. Upon receiving the award, Sermon had no plans about what he would produce before the three-month residency and took a "blank canvas" approach in order to respond to his environment and assume an action research based method in developing the work. The process was documented as part of the AHRC Performing Presence project that was led by Professor Nick Kaye, from the University of Exeter.

What came about was "Headroom". It was exhibited at the Xinyi Public Assembly Hall in Taipei in March to May, 2006. A juxtaposition of Sermon's experiences in Taipei, between the way people live and the way people escape, it compares the solitude of a bedroom space with the telepresence of the internet "space". It also refers to Sermon's former lecturer, and great influence, Professor Roy Ascott's essay, "Is There Love in the Telematic Embrace?" written in 1990, where Ascott talks about whether technology would ever dehumanise the arts, this being a huge concern for artists and art critics alike when it was written. It asked whether if Telematic Art had the potential to embody love, would it not make sense for art to be electronic and at the same time serve human principles? Headroom is also very reminiscent of Nam June Paik's early Buddha television installations as it has been described as a "reflection of the self within the telepresent space, as both the viewer and the performer of this intimate encounter". (artsvillage.org). The television screen turns into a stage or portal between causes and effects that happen in the minds of the viewers.

== Research ==
=== Research output ===
Paul Sermon's research output is usually practical gallery exhibited artworks and installations, often then contextualised by the gallery's own exhibition catalogues, reviews, conference papers and articles found in journals. With ongoing research funding income from grants and acquisitions, Sermon has been able to carry on producing, showing and discussing his work internationally. Since 2001, Sermon has produced eleven new gallery installations and shown both new and old artworks of his in such venues as The Museum for Communication in 2002, Worcester City Art Gallery in 2003, New York's Eyebeam Gallery and The John Curtin Gallery in Perth, Australia in 2004, and Taiwan's Museum of Fine Art, Manchester's Museum of Science and Industry and the Evelina Children's Hospital, London in 2005. As well as practical installations presenting his research, it has also been written about in several book chapters, most recently in "New Media Art- Practice and Context in the UK, 1994-2004" (2004), Edited by Lucy Kimbell, in the section "What Happens if We do This?" as well as writing chapters in "Networked Narrative Environments" edited by Andrea Zapp and " Dance and Technology" by Alexander Verlag. He has also written journal publications and reviews including "The Teleporter Zone- Interactive media arts in the healthcare context" (2007), a peer reviewed journal article in Leonardo.

=== Research supervision ===
Paul Sermon, through his role as a PhD creative technology supervisor, has established a postgraduate research culture that is mainly practice based and defines interactive media arts practice as a research method. He has supervised three PhD students, all at the University of Salford's school of art and design, two of which received funding from Adelphi RA and The AHRB.
