= White Heat Cold Logic =

2008 book edited by Paul Brown, Charlie Gere, Nicholas Lambert, and Catherine Mason

White Heat Cold Logic: British Computer Art 1960–1980
- Editor: Paul Brown, Charlie Gere, Nicholas Lambert, Catherine Mason
- Language: English
- Series: Leonardo Book Series
- Subject: British computer art (1960–1980)
- Genre: Non-fiction, history of art, history of computing
- Publisher: MIT Press
- Publication date: 2008
- Publication place: United States/United Kingdom
- Media type: Print (hardcover)
- Pages: xi+450
- ISBN: 978-0-262-02653-6

White Heat Cold Logic (2008), edited by Paul Brown, Charlie Gere, Nicholas Lambert, and Catherine Mason, is a book about the history of British computer art during 1960–1980.

== Overview ==
The book includes 29 contributed chapters by a variety of authors. The book was published in 2008 by MIT Press, in hardcover format. It also includes a series foreword by Sean Cubbitt, the editor-in-chief of the Leonardo Book Series.

== Contributors ==
The following authors contributed chapters in the book:

- Roy Ascott
- Stephen Bell
- Paul Brown
- Stephen Bury
- Harold Cohen
- Ernest Edmonds
- Maria Fernández
- Simon Ford
- John Hamilton Frazer
- Jeremy Gardiner
- Charlie Gere
- Adrian Glew
- Beryl Graham
- Stan Hayward
- Graham Howard
- Richard Ihnatowicz
- Malcolm Le Grice
- Tony Longson
- Brent MacGregor
- George Mallen
- Catherine Mason
- Jasia Reichardt
- Stephen A. R. Scrivener
- Brian Reffin Smith
- Alan Sutcliffe
- Doron D. Swade
- John Vince
- Richard Wright
- Aleksandar Zivanovic

== Reviews ==
The book has been reviewed in a number of publications and online, including:

- Amazon.co.uk.
- BCS.
- Furtherfield.
- Leonardo.
- Realtime.
- Wired.

== See also ==
- Event One computer art exhibition (1969)
