= Joshua Davis (designer) =

American web designer (born 1971)

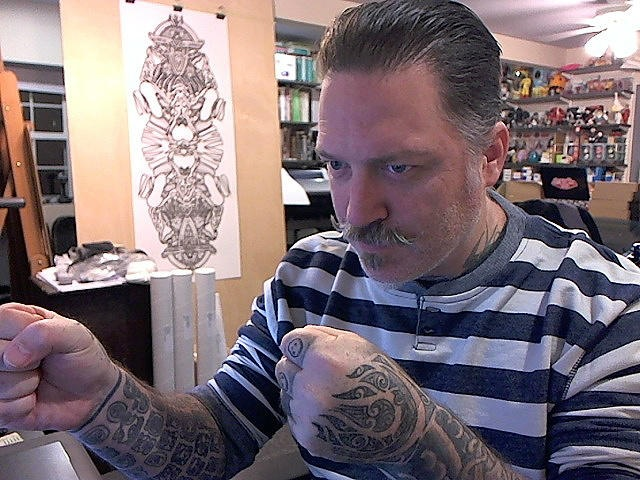
- Davis in his studio December 7th 2012, working on the "Forty Thieves" exhibition
- Born: Joshua Schmidt; June 13, 1971 (age 55); San Diego, California, United States
- Education: Columbine High School; Marina High School; Pratt Institute
- Occupations: Designer, artist, technologist, writer, professor, lecturer
- Years active: 1994–present
- Notable work: Web: pratt.edu / 1995; i/o 360 / 1996-1998; cyphen.com / 1998; praystation.com (.net .org) / 1998; once-upon-a-forest.com / 1999; dreamless.org / 1999-2001; kioken.com / 1998-2003; Installation: IBM Watson / 2011; Music: Tool / 2003; Deadmau5 / 2011-*; Phantogram / 2013-*
- Spouse: Melissa Lockhart (m. 2000)
- Children: Kelly Ann Davis
- Parent(s): David Davis; Mary Beckmann
- Awards: Prix Ars Electronica 2001 Golden Nica for "Net Vision / Net Excellence”
- Website: joshuadavis.com

Joshua Davis (born June 13, 1971) is an American designer, technologist, author, and visual artist in new media.

He is best known as the creator of praystation.com, winner of the Prix Ars Electronica 2001 Golden Nica for "Net Vision / Net Excellence”. He was an early adopter of open-source software, offering the source code of the praystation.com composition and animation developments to the public.

Davis had a role in designing the visualization of IBM's Watson, the intelligent computer program capable of answering questions, for the quiz show Jeopardy.

His work has been inducted into the Smithsonian's Cooper Hewitt Design Museum, National Design Triennial 2006 “Design Life Now”, and he has spoken at the TED and 99U conferences about his career in algorithmic image making and open-source software.

== Career ==
Since 1995, Joshua Davis has made a career as an image maker using programming. He writes his own code to produce interactions with users and generate visual compositions according to rule-based, randomized processes.

Davis was an early web designer. He was introduced to the internet by a design student friend at the Pratt Institute in Brooklyn, where he studied illustration and art history. After a year of working on illustration by day and programming at night, Davis ran out of cash and was offered a job writing HTML for Pratt's web site. He dropped out of Pratt in his junior year to work in the new field of design technology.

== Selected works ==
=== Praystation ===
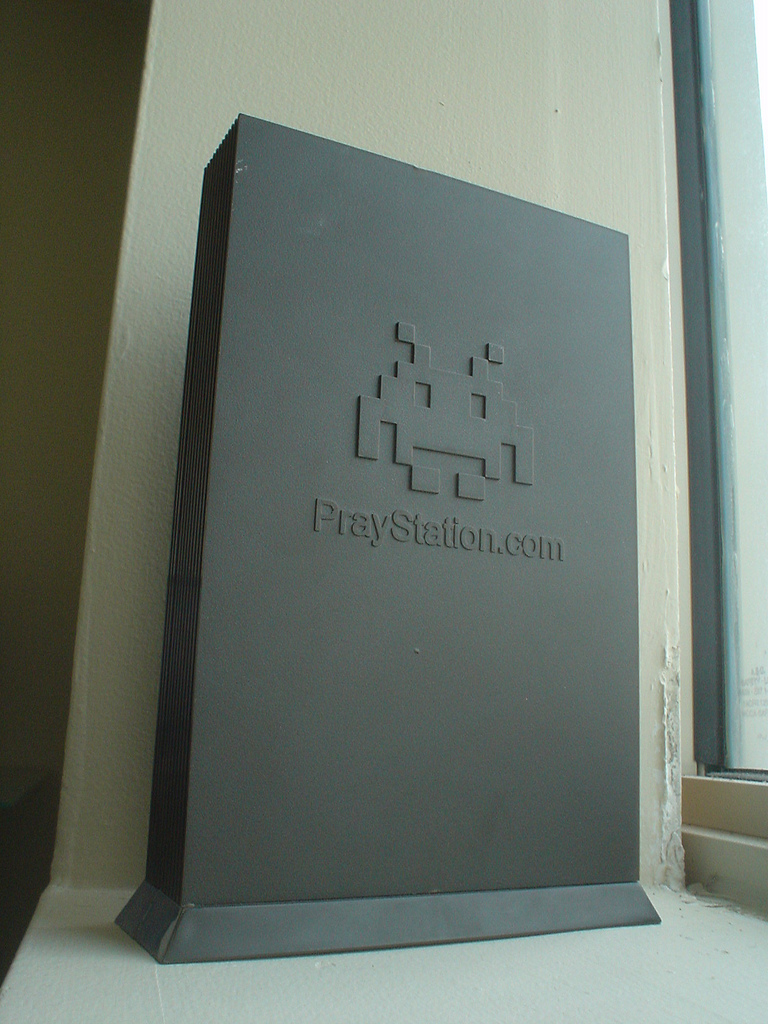
PrayStation Hardrive standing plastic CD casing

His website, Praystation.com, which he would use to exhibit new design work and experiments, was one of the first to offer open source Flash files.

The second year of Praystation.com was compiled into a CD-ROM called PrayStation Hardrive, which included source files, photos and miscellaneous items that Joshua Davis worked on during that time, distributed in limited quantities by IdN magazine. The disc included a 32-page booklet and was packaged in a plastic casing modeled after the PlayStation 2.

=== Dreamless ===
Dreamless.org was the site of a popular Internet forum, hosted by Joshua Davis from 1999 to 2001. Its minimal design, understated Web presence and hidden registration page all added to its intrigue, and for a while it was a gathering place for many graphic and web designers and programmers. "Photoshop Battles" were a popular activity among forum members, leading into the internet phenomenon now referred to as Photoshop tennis.

The community of Dreamless traveled past the boundaries of the Internet — impromptu local meetings ("riots", as Davis called them) were arranged for Dreamless users to meet face-to-face and exchange ideas.

Threadless founders Jake Nickell and Jacob DeHart met while active in the Dreamless community, and started Threadless after Jake won a T-shirt design competition run by Dreamless.

One notorious forum on Dreamless was "08 - Meaningless and Shallow", a topical free-for-all which led to numerous flame wars, post floods and user-led XSS vandalism. After several "meltdowns" and member disputes, Davis closed Dreamless in July 2001.

The link was reused to host Davis's Minecraft server. While private at the time of its creation, it is now open to everyone. The server was used mainly by the Deadmau5 mau5ville Minecraft community. As of July 2021 the minecraft server is no longer running.

=== Books ===
- Davis, Joshua (2000). New Masters of Flash. 1st edition. Friends of Ed. ISBN 1-59059-209-3. Archived from the original on 2006-06-14.
- Davis, Joshua (2002-07-24). Flash to the Core: An Interactive Sketchbook. New Riders Publishing. ISBN 0-7357-1288-3.

=== Multimedia ===
- Davis, Joshua (2001). Praystation Hardrive. Systems Designs, Ltd. ISBN 962-86177-1-0.

=== Websites ===
- Once Upon A Forest
- PrayStation.com - Year 2, version 4 archive
- Hype Framework - A collaborative project with Branden Hall

== Awards and accolades ==
Joshua Davis was the winner of the 2001 Prix Ars Electronica Golden Nica in the category “Net Excellence” and has exhibited his works at the Tate Modern (London), the Ars Electronica (Austria), the Design Museum (London), le Centre Pompidou (France), the Institute of Contemporary Arts (London), PS.1 MoMA (New York), among others. In December 2006, his work was included in the Smithsonian’s Cooper-Hewitt, National Design Museum’s "National Design Triennial: Design Life Now" exhibit.
