= Maja Smrekar =

Slovenian artist (born 1978)

- Born: 1978 (age 47–48); Brežice, Slovenia
- Education: Academy of Fine Arts and Design
- Known for: Sculpture

Maja Smrekar (1978, Brežice, Slovenia) is a Slovenian intermedia artist. In 2005 she graduated at the Department for Sculpture of Fine Art and Design Academy in Ljubljana. She also holds Master's degree in Video and New Media that she obtained at the same institution. She has exhibited in numerous institutions across the world. In 2017 she received the Golden Nica award at the Ars Electronica festival for her K-9_topology series. In this opus, which consist of four projects ('Ecce Canis', 'I Hunt Nature and Culture Hunts Me', 'Hybrid Family', and 'ARTE_mis') she addressed the topics of parallel evolution of human and dog. From 2008 she is a featured artist and production partner of Kapelica Gallery in Ljubljana.

In her artistic work she often employs biotechnological tools, meaning that her art works are often created in laboratory settings in which she collaborated with scientists and technologists. Hence, she is sometimes regarded as a laboratory-based bio-artist, along with the artists like Eduardo Kac, Joe Davis, Marta de Menezes and Paul Vanouse. She is known for uncovering and addressing difficult bioethical problems and dilemmas in her work, especially related to the position of the human species at the top and center of the ecosystem (anthropocentrism), the ambiguities of current and future biotechnological practices and the concept of the post-human world.
