= HeHe (artists) =

Environmental artist duo

HeHe is an artist duo made up of Helen Evans and Heiko Hansen.

== Beginnings ==
Helen Evans, born in 1972, is British and French. She studied scenography at Wimbledon School of Art and computer-related design at the Royal College of Art in London.

Heiko Hansen, born in 1970, is German. He studied mechanical engineering at Hamburg University of Applied Sciences and industrial design at the Hamburg School of Fine Arts. He has a master's degree in Digital Design from the Royal College of Art.

They live and work in Le Havre. They teach at the École supérieure d'art et design Le Havre-Rouen, where they coordinate the Art/Media/Environment program.

== Work ==
They use installation art, sculpture, performance and design in their work, which is critical of the mythologies of Anthropocene and modern industrial, social and ecological issues. One of their most important works is Nuage vert/Pollstream, an installation that makes polluting fumes released by factories at night visible using heat detection and a laser device. This installation, presented in Helsinki, won the 2008 Golden Nica prize ("Hybrid arts") at the Ars Electronica festival and the 2008 Environmental Art Fund in Finland.

HeHe has produced monumental works for numerous institutions: Ondernemersfonds Utrecht, Triennale de Bruges, Casino Forum d'art contemporain (Luxembourg), Museum of Contemporary Art, Zagreb, Nuit Blanche à Paris, Le Voyage à Nantes, FACT Liverpool, Centre Georges Pompidou Paris, Un été au Havre, etc.

== Bibliography ==
- (en, fr) Jens Hauser, Noortje Marres, Gunnar Schmidt, Malcom Miles, Jean-Marc Chomaz, Helen Evans, Heiko Hansen, Man Made Clouds, HYX editions 2016 ISBN 978-2910385774
- (en) Jean-Paul Fourmentraux, « Critical Design: Art and Politics of Public Spaces HeHe (Helen Evans and Heiko Hansen) Interviewed by Jean-Paul Fourmentraux », dans Samuel Bianchini, Erik Verhagen, Practicable : From Participation to Interaction in Contemporary Art, MIT Press, November 2016 ISBN 9780262034753.
