= NECA =

NECA or Neca may refer to:

- National Entertainment Collectibles Association, an American merchandise licensee of film and television for the enthusiast market
- National Electrical Contractors Association, an American trade association
  - NECA Show, electrical construction industry's trade show since 1901
- National Exchange Carrier Association, an American association of telephone common carriers
- Neca (footballer) (born 1979), real name João Alexandre Duarte Ferreira Fernandes, Portuguese footballer
- NECA Project, Net Environment for Embodied Emotional Conversational Agents
- Nitrous Oxide Emission Control Area, sea areas with regulated nitrous oxides emission caps
- North East Combined Authority (2014–2024), a former local government body in North East England
- North East Combined Authority, a local government body in North East England
- 5′-(N-Ethylcarboxamido)adenosine (NECA), a reference agonist for adenosine G protein-coupled receptors; see Adenosine A2A receptor
