= Virtual Human Markup Language =

Markup language

The Virtual Human Markup Language often abbreviated as VHML is a markup language used for the computer animation of human bodies and facial expressions. The language is designed to describe various aspects of human-computer interactions with regards to facial animation, text to Speech, and multimedia information.

== Format ==
VHML consists of the following so-called "sub-languages":

- Emotional Markup Language (EML)
- Gesture Markup Language (GML)
- Speech Markup Language (SML)
- Facial Animation Markup Language (FAML)
- Body Animation Markup Language (BAML)
- Extensible HyperText Markup Language (XHTML)
- Dialogue Manager Markup Language (DMML)

== See also ==
- Rich Representation Language
