= NECA Project =

Multimodal research project

The NECA Project (Net Environment for Embodied Emotional Conversational Agents) was a research project that focused on multimodal communication with animated agents in a virtual world. NECA was funded by the European Commission from 1998 to 2002 and the research results were published up to 2005.

The project focused on communication between animated agents in a virtual world, using characters that exhibit realistic personality traits and natural looking behavior that reflects the emotional features of conversations. The project goal was to combine different research efforts such as situation-based natural language and speech generation, representation of non-verbal expression, and the modeling of emotions and personality.

== Goals and milestones ==
The underlying research direction of the NECA Project was the development of a computing platform in which animated characters within a virtual world could be capable of realistic behavior. For character interactions to look natural, various factors such the proxemics of the distance between their bodies as they interact, to the kinesics of body language at the individual level, and the level of eye contact between individuals, as well as the paralinguistics of tone and intonation of sentences had to be considered.

Based on that the research there were three main goals for NECA. The first goal was the general development of a platform that allowed the simulation and interaction of conversational characters.

The second goal was the design of a multi-user web-application called the Socialite, that allowed social "face to face" emotion-based interactions between animated agents on the internet. The Socialite user could select a set of avatars to interact with and after learning about the user's personal preferences, the avatars helped the user navigate a virtual world and get in touch with other agents and users.

The third component was eShowRoom as an e-commerce platform demonstration that allowed for the display of products in the commercial domain. In the eShowRoom application, two or three virtual agents could be seen discussing various features of a product among themselves in a natural setting.

== Examples of NECA research ==
One of NECA's designs was the Rich Representation Language, specifically designed to facilitate the interaction of two or more animated agents. RRL influenced the design of other languages such as the Player Markup Language which extended parts of the design of RRL.

The design of RRL aimed to automatically generate much of the facial animation as well as the skeletal animation based on the content of the conversations. Due to the interdependence of nonverbal communication components such as facial features on the spoken words, no animation is possible in the language without considering the context of the scene in which the animation takes place - e.g. anger versus joy.

== See also ==
- Facial Action Coding System
- Humanoid animation
- International Computer Science Institute
- Interactive Multimodal Information Management (IM2)
- Virtual human
