= Caroline Goyder =

British communications and acting expert

Caroline Goyder is a British communications coach and author. She worked for over a decade as a voice tutor at the Royal Central School of Speech and Drama in London. Her coaching applies theatrical acting techniques and performance training to public speaking, interviews, and professional communication.

Goyder has applied her acting and performance coaching expertise to help individuals overcome public speaking anxiety, including in informal but high-pressure settings such as best man speeches and board executive committees. In one case, Goyder coached a speech-anxious client through a short course at the Royal Central School of Speech and Drama. The sessions focused on performance-based techniques used by actors to manage stage fright. These included mainstream bodywork hacks like grounding exercises to stabilise posture, breathing techniques to lower anxiety, and strategies to relax areas of the body commonly affected by stress. Goyder emphasises diaphragmatic breathing over chest breathing to avoid triggering the body's fight-or-flight response, which can inhibit cognitive function and vocal control. The vocal and breathing exercises she promotes are standard practices within introductory voice coaching and publicly accessible self-help resources, rather than proprietary techniques. From a physiological perspective, vocal science notes that the diaphragm acts primarily as an involuntary muscle during inhalation and plays no direct active role during exhalation. Consequently, voice researchers and speech-language pathologists consider concepts such as "diaphragmatic control" during speech to be physiological misnomers..She also trains clients to use eye contact, physical openness, and deliberate pauses to project confidence and connect with audiences. She encourages speakers to prioritise delivery over scripted content and advises against memorising speeches word-for-word. Goyder says wedding guests respond more positively to spontaneous, engaging delivery than formal or overly polished remarks. Drawing on the work of psychologist Albert Mehrabian, she highlights that vocal tone and body language carry more weight than the actual words in public speaking.Merhabian himself has however objected to the way communication coaches have traditionally used his research, by publishing the following text on his web page: "Please note that this and other equations regarding relative importance of verbal and nonverbal messages were derived from experiments dealing with communications of feelings and attitudes (i.e., like-dislike). Unless a communicator is talking about their feelings or attitudes, these equations are not applicable".

Goyder's TED talk on overcoming stage fright has received millions of views. Her approach combines physical awareness with elements of mainstream British vocal technique for actors, emphasising that posture, breath, and movement influence how confidently a person comes across when speaking. She regularly trains politicians and business leaders.

== Publications ==
=== The Star Qualities ===
Pan Macmillan's Sidgwick & Jackson published The Star Qualities in 2011. In this book, Goyder explores how professional actors manage stage fright and develop confidence in her book The Star Qualities. The book includes contributions from actors such as Ewan McGregor, Helen Mirren, and Bill Nighy. McGregor recounts using yoga to manage anxiety before performances. Mirren describes the vocal techniques she employed when preparing for public speeches, including her Oscar acceptance speech.

The book's central idea is that actors develop reliable tools such as body language, vocal control, and mental rehearsal to perform effectively under pressure. Goyder argues that these methods can benefit non-performers in job interviews, public speaking, or high-stress social events. The book includes posture, breath control, and physical presence exercises to help readers project confidence, even when nervous or uncertain.

Contributors to the book describe personal strategies for managing self-doubt and anxiety. Goyder highlights visualisation techniques, vocal grounding, and gestures to reinforce speech delivery. She positions these as learnable skills rather than innate traits.

=== Gravitas ===
Gravitas explores how individuals can develop presence and authority in professional settings through confident communication. Drawing on her experience as a voice and presentation coach, Goyder outlines practical techniques to help readers speak with clarity, composure, and impact.

In the book, Goyder argues that gravitas is not an innate trait but a skill that can be learned. She identifies key components of preparation, physical presence, vocal control, and self-belief. The book provides exercises designed to help readers manage nerves, distil complex information, and deliver messages with conviction.

Penguin Random House's imprint, Vermilion, published the book in 2014.

=== Find Your Voice: Secrets to Speaking with Confidence ===
Penguin Random House published Find Your Voice: Secrets to Speaking with Confidence in 2020. In her book, Caroline Goyder outlines techniques for developing vocal presence and reducing performance anxiety. She argues that movement is a critical part of preparation for effective public speaking. A key theme in the book is the management of anxiety. Goyder normalises nervousness by citing examples from high-profile individuals, and explains how common physiological responses such as racing thoughts or trembling can be regulated through physical awareness. She teaches readers to use techniques such as diaphragmatic breathing, body grounding, and sensory focus to override the body's fight-or-flight response. Goyder emphasises rehearsal and preparation, recommending using voice notes and repeated practice to embed content into muscle memory. She argues that confidence stems not from eliminating fear but from effectively working with it. The book also provides tailored advice for introverts, encouraging quiet preparation and deliberate pausing, and highlights the importance of posture and pacing in delivering clear, grounded communication. Goyder introduces the concept of "finding your brakes" to help speakers manage pace and prevent the loss of control often caused by adrenaline.
