= FAP =

FAP may refer to:

== Technology and industry ==
- FORTRAN Assembly Program, the macro assembler for some IBM mainframe computers
- Fair Access Policy, a term for a bandwidth cap, limiting Internet usage
- Femtocell (Femto Access Point), a small cellular telephone base station
- Fabrika automobila Priboj (FAP), a motor vehicle manufacturer based in Priboj, Serbia
- Film Academy of the Philippines, the Philippines' official counterpart of the United States' Academy of Motion Picture Arts and Sciences
- Face Animation Parameter, part of the MPEG-4 face animation standard developed by the Moving Picture Experts Group

== Science and medicine ==
- Functional analytic psychotherapy, clinical psychotherapy that uses a "radical behaviorist" position
- Familial adenomatous polyposis, a condition where polyps form in the large intestine
- Familial amyloid polyneuropathy, a neurodegenerative, genetically transmitted disease
- Fixed action pattern, an instinctive animal behavioral sequence
- Filamentous anoxygenic phototroph, a descriptive term for the Chloroflexia class of photosynthetic bacteria
- FAP (gene), a human gene, encoding for the fibroblast activation protein
- Fas-associated phosphatase, a molecule that inhibits the effect of Fas ligand to make cells initiate apoptosis
- Final Anthropic Principle, a generalization of the Anthropic Principle, proposed by physicists Frank J. Tipler and John D. Barrow

== Politics, government, and armed forces ==
- Broad Progressive Front (Argentina) (Spanish: Frente Amplio Progresista), an Argentine political party
- Federal-aid primary highway system, part of the United States federal-aid highway program
- Federal Art Project, the visual arts arm of the US Great Depression-era Federal One program
- Francis Allen-Palenske (born 1976/1977), American politician from Las Vegas, Nevada
- Family Assistance Plan, a failed US welfare program
- FREE Australia Party, an Australian political party
- Free German Workers' Party (German: Freiheitliche Arbeiter Partei), a defunct German political party
- Fijian Association Party
- Paraguayan Air Force (Spanish: Fuerza Aérea Paraguaya)
- People's Armed Forces (French: Forces Armées Populaires), a Chadian insurgent group
- Peronist Armed Forces, (Spanish: Fuerzas Armadas Peronistas), an Argentine guerrilla group operating in the 1960s and 1970s
- Peruvian Air Force (Spanish: Fuerza Aérea del Peru)
- Portuguese Air Force (Portuguese: Força Aérea Portuguesa)

== Other ==
- Fap, a slang term for masturbation
- 2014 celebrity nude photo leak, popularly termed "The Fappening" or "Celebgate"
- Feminist Art Program, an art program for women only
- FAP Basketball, a Cameroonian basketball team
