= Lansdown Centre for Electronic Arts =

Former art school of Middlesex University

Coordinates: 51.644°N 0.148°W

The Lansdown Centre for Electronic Arts was a research centre at Middlesex University in North London, England. It played a significant role in the early development of computer graphics and continued to innovate in interactive media, sonic arts and moving image. It also provided postgraduate and undergraduate teaching.

== History ==
A pen-plotted animated sequence from Keith Waters early work on 3D modelling of the Statue of Liberty 1987.

The Centre for Electronic Arts was renamed the Lansdown Centre for Electronic Arts after the death of the computer graphics pioneer John Lansdown, its head from 1993 until 1997. Its roots lay in the work of John Vince to develop computer graphics at the university (then a polytechnic). From the 1970s, Vince and others developed two suites of computer graphics subroutines in the FORTRAN programming language, initially to create line drawings of 2D and 3D objects and, later, full-colour images with smooth Gouraud and Phong shading. This work fed into short courses attended by media personnel.

In 1985, Middlesex was awarded the status of National Centre for Computer Aided Art and Design, under Paul Brown. The UK's first MSc course in Computer Graphics was developed there. One graduate, Keith Waters, went on to a PhD in 1988, awarded for his development of a muscle-based model for facial animation.

The 2008 book White Heat Cold Logic records the pioneering role of Middlesex Polytechnic in British computer art, as does the CACHe project.

== See also ==
- Event One (1969)
