= Hand-Over =

Hand motion capture in animation

A Hand-Over is a term used in the animation industry to refer to the process of adding finger and hand motion capture data to the pre-existing full-body motion capture data, using a hand motion capture device.

== Techniques ==
A Hand-Over is accomplished by playing back the full-body data while recording the finger and hand data. This is similar to a voice actor doing a voice-over for animated characters.

There are very few full-body motion capture systems that can capture full hand and finger motion data at the same time as the full body. An optical system gets accurate data using reflective markers and high resolution cameras. However, if the cameras cannot see the markers then they are unable to measure them. Mounting the many reflective markers on each individual joint of the hand so that they stay within the camera's views is difficult.The traditional method of adding hand and finger motion is to key frame the fingers. This is a process similar to the old claymation process; move the finger, record the frame, move the finger again, record the frame. Key framing is easier using animation software where a beginning and an ending position can be set up, then the software fills in the motion in between. Even though software makes this easy it still takes a very talented artist to get realistic hands using the key frame method.

Another method of adding hand and finger motion is to have the animator or actor wear a data glove or wired glove. These devices very accurately measure and record the position and bend of each finger, thumb, and even the hand. Measurand's ShapeHand is made of flexible ribbons and includes 40 Fiber Optic bend/twist sensors.

Using a hand motion capture device an animator can play back the full-body data from any system and record the hand motion. This is typically done in a software package that can simultaneously play motion capture data while recording new motion capture data. This requires some practice to get the timing right just as it takes practice to get the timing right when a voice actor does an animation voice-over.

Hand-overs can save time and money while increasing the realism in hand and finger animation. This is not done without controversy. Traditional key framers do not agree this type of motion capture is better than their craft.

== See also ==
- Animation database
- Computer Animation
