= Keith Waters =

British animator (born 1962)

Keith Waters (born 1962 in Kent, England) is a British animator who is best known for his work in the field of computer facial animation. He has received international awards from Parigraph, the National Computer Graphics Association and the Computer Animation Film Festival.

== Early life ==
Keith Waters was born in Kent in 1962 and attended Sevenoaks School. He received his PhD from Middlesex University (UK) in 1988 after completing a BA in Graphic Design at Cat Hill Barnet. His early work on algorithms for face animation in 1986 allowed him to transfer from a MPhil to a PhD while studying under the supervision of Paul Brown and John Vince at Middlesex Polytechnic at the Centre for Advanced Studies in Computer Aided Art and Design. His studies required numerous trips to Bounds Green to use the computing facilities within the school of engineering.

Waters is best known for his work in computer facial animation that includes a muscle-based model for facial animation, a physically-based skin tissue model as well as a visual text-to-speech system called DECface. He is a co-author of the book "Computer Facial Animation" a guide to facial animation. The first edition published in 1995 and a second edition was published in 2008. His muscle algorithms for face animation were widely used in the computer film industry, most notably by Pixar, which first used the technique in their animation short Tin Toy.

Waters was the director of engineering device software at Nexage, prior to that a principal architect at Akamai Technologies Inc., and previously a Director of Research at Orange Labs, Boston MA, USA. Keith has been active in Human Computer Interaction (HCI) and has published scientific papers on novel applications. He has been engaged with the W3C is the development of Web standards for the mobile Web.

== Professional career ==
After graduating from the Centre for Advanced Studies in Computer Aided Art and Design (now the Lansdown Centre for Electronic Arts) at Middlesex University in 1988 with a PhD in computer graphics, Keith Waters worked for Schlumberger in Palo Alto and then at their Research Lab for Computer Science Austin Texas where he worked on parallel CM-2 data visualization. In 1991 he joined the Cambridge Research Lab of Digital Equipment Boston MA where he continued to work on user interfaces including DECface the visual equivalent of DECtalk the text-to-speech engine. Later, he went on to create the FaceWorks product that was used at Comdex. While at Compaq he invented a variety of user interfaces including the first Smart Kiosk, the invisible mouse, an image-based touchscreen and a wallable macrodevice. He worked on film and television high-performance face animation techniques at LifeF/X before joining Orange in 2001 where he became a senior expert in mobile services developing next-generation mobile Web technologies for high performance open source devices. Recently he was a principal architect at Akamai Technologies Inc., assisting them with their mobile strategy.

== Awards ==
Keith Waters received international awards from Parigraph, the National Computer Graphics Association and the Computer Animation Film Festival for his animation shorts on face animation and in particular for the sequences of the Queen and Margaret Thatcher in 1986. The computer-generated characters were generated from the animated puppets of Spitting Image which were kindly moulded specifically for his research by Roger Law and Peter Fluck.

== See also ==
- White Heat Cold Logic (2008)
