= PAD emotional state model =

Psychological model based on Pleasure, Arousal and Dominance

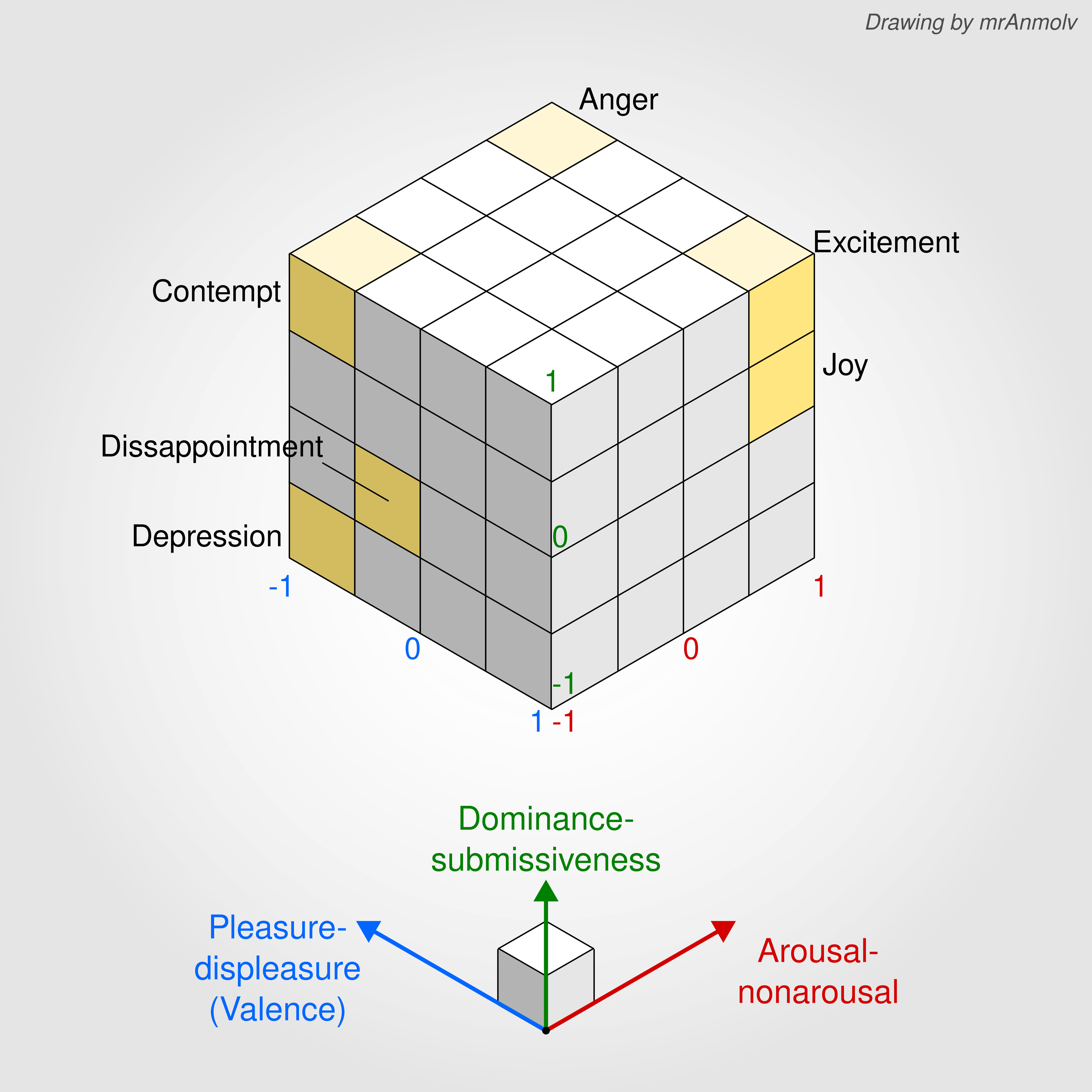
Representation of PAD model done with cubes

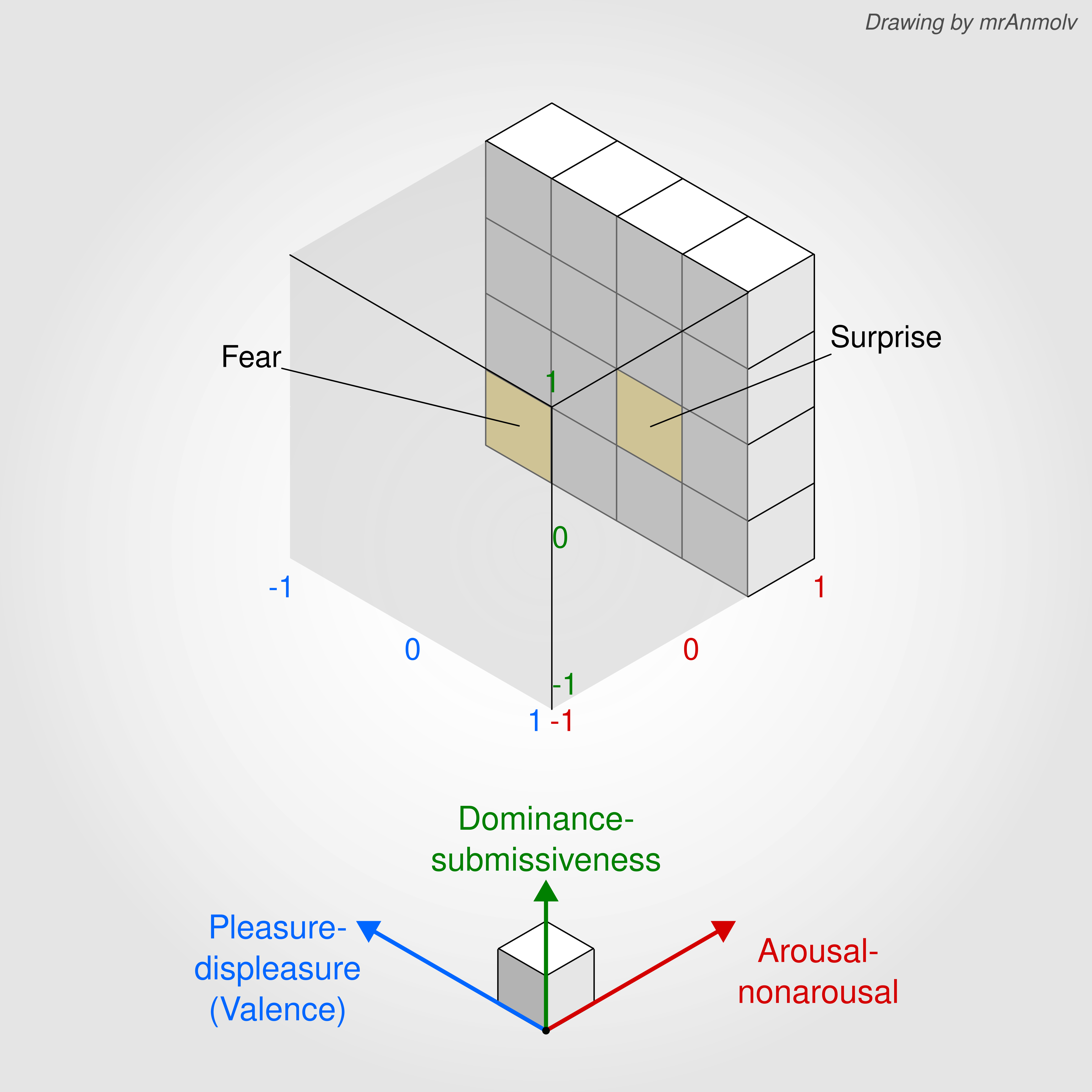
Focus on higher arousal section of the model

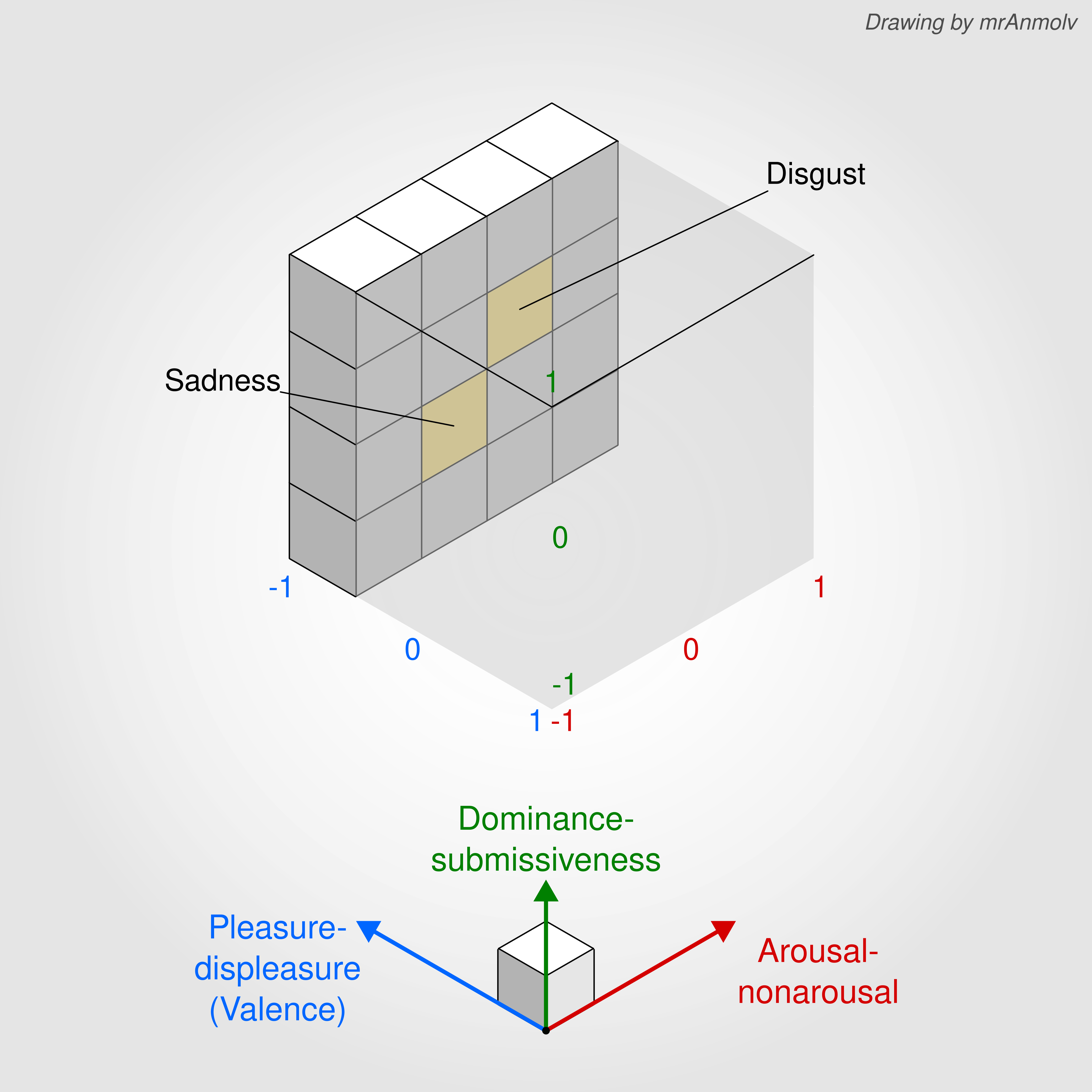
Focus on lower valence section of the model

The PAD emotional state model is a psychological model developed by Albert Mehrabian and James A. Russell (1974 and after) to describe and measure emotional states. PAD uses three numerical dimensions, Pleasure, Arousal and Dominance to represent all emotions. Its initial use was in a theory of environmental psychology, the core idea being that physical environments influence people through their emotional impact. It was subsequently used by Peter Lang and colleagues to propose a physiological theory of emotion. It was also used by James A. Russell to develop a theory of emotional episodes (relatively brief emotionally charged events). The PA part of PAD was developed into a circumplex model of emotion experience, and those two dimensions were termed "core affect". The D part of PAD was re-conceptualized as part of the appraisal process in an emotional episode (a cold cognitive assessment of the situation eliciting the emotion). A more fully developed version of this approach is termed the psychological construction theory of emotion.

The PAD (Pleasure, Arousal, Dominance) model has been used to study nonverbal communication such as body language in psychology. It has also been applied to consumer marketing and the construction of animated characters that express emotions in virtual worlds.

== The dimensional structure ==
PAD uses three-dimensional scales which in theory could have any numerical values. The dimensional structure is reminiscent of the 19th century work of Wilhelm Wundt who also used a three-dimensional system and also the 20th century work of Charles E. Osgood.

The Pleasure-Displeasure Scale measures how pleasant or unpleasant one feels about something. For instance, both anger and fear are unpleasant emotions, and both score on the displeasure side. However, joy is a pleasant emotion.

The Arousal-Nonarousal Scale measures how energized or soporific one feels. It is not the intensity of the emotion -- for grief and depression can be low arousal intense feelings. While both anger and rage are unpleasant emotions, rage has a higher intensity or a higher arousal state. However boredom, which is also an unpleasant state, has a low arousal value.

The Dominance-Submissiveness Scale represents the controlling and dominant versus controlled or submissive one feels. For instance, while both fear and anger are unpleasant emotions, anger is a dominant emotion, while fear is a submissive emotion.

A more abbreviated version of the model uses just 4 values for each dimension, providing only 64 values for possible emotions. For instance, anger is a quite unpleasant, quite aroused, and moderately dominant emotion, while boredom is slightly unpleasant, quite unaroused, and mostly non-dominant.

== Applications ==
=== Marketing ===
The abbreviated model has also been used in organizational studies where the emotions towards specific entities or products marketed by the respective organisations are measured.

The PAD model has been used in studying consumer behavior in stores, to determine the effects of pleasure and arousal on issues such as extra time spent in the store and unplanned spending.

=== Virtual emotional characters ===
The PAD model, and the corresponding PAD Space have been used in the construction of animated agents that exhibit emotions. For instance, Becker et al. describes how primary and secondary emotions can be mapped via the PAD space to features in the faces of animated characters to reflect happiness, boredom, frustration or annoyance. Lance et al. discuss how the PAD model can be used to study gaze behavior in animated agents.

Zhang et al. describes how the PAD model can be used to assign specific emotions to the faces of avatars. In this approach the PAD model is used as a high-level emotional space, and the lower-level space is the MPEG-4 Facial Animation Parameters (FAP). A mid-level Partial Expression Parameters (PEP) space is then used in a two-level structure: the PAD-PEP mapping and the PEP-FAP translation model.

== See also ==
- Affect measures
