= National Electrical Contractors Association =

American industry trade association

Official logo of the National Electrical Contractors Association

The National Electrical Contractors Association (NECA) is a trade association in the United States representing the electrical contracting industry through advocacy, education, research, and standards development.

== History ==
In 1901, at the Pan-American Exposition in Buffalo, New York, a group of electrical contractors met and organized the National Electrical Contractors Association of the United States. The organization’s first constitution stated their objectives: “The fostering of trade among electrical contractors…to reform abuses…to settle differences between its members…and to promote more enlarged and friendly discourse among its members.″

== Organization ==
NECA currently has 119 local chapters across the United States, with a national headquarters in Washington, D.C. including international chapters throughout the world. At the local level, each NECA chapter is an independently chartered organization with the autonomy to elect officers, determine priorities, set member dues and service charges, and help negotiate labor agreements with their local International Brotherhood of Electrical Workers (IBEW) union(s). NECA is led by a chief executive officer, an elected president, a board of governors, district vice presidents, and committees.

NECA represents electrical contractors and firms ranging from small businesses to large, multinational companies. A directory of contractors is available at NECA Connection.

== Programs and services ==
=== Advocacy ===
NECA works closely with the IBEW at the local and national levels to develop mutually acceptable labor agreements.

The Government Affairs office of NECA focuses on legislation and regulation affecting electrical contractors and the industry as a whole. NECA informs key policymakers of the views of electrical contractors through legislative monitoring, grassroots and constituent action, lobbying, and the Electrical Construction Political Action Committee (ECPAC).

=== Research ===
As the founding sponsor of ELECTRI International, NECA sponsors research by industry leaders, focused on business and project management practices impacting electrical contractors. Research focuses on improving productivity, project labor agreements, and benchmarking safety programs.

=== Industry information ===
NECA produces numerous resources addressing business and project management, labor relations, codes and standards, safety, marketing, government affairs and regulation, and technical issues. The association also provides management education and supervisory training programs for industry leaders, publishes ELECTRICAL CONTRACTOR magazine, and sponsors the electrical contracting industry’s premier convention and trade show, NECA Show.
