= Triphone =

Sequence of three consecutive phones

In linguistics, a triphone is a sequence of three consecutive phones. Triphones are useful in models of natural language processing where they are used to establish the various contexts in which a phoneme can occur in a particular natural language.

== See also ==
- Diphone
