= Albert Mehrabian =

American psychologist (born 1939)

Albert Mehrabian (born 1939) is Professor Emeritus of Psychology at the University of California, Los Angeles. He is best known for his publications on the relative importance of verbal and nonverbal messages.

== Early life and career ==
Mehrabian, born in 1939 to an Armenian family in Iran, initially trained as an engineer, but gained renown for his research on the relative importance of verbal and nonverbal communication. In addition to his scholarly work, Mehrabian developed several psychological assessment tools, including the Arousal Seeking Tendency Scale. His most famous contribution is the "7%-38%-55% Rule", also called "Mehrabian's Rule", which highlights the varying impact of words, tone of voice, and body language in conveying feelings and attitudes. However, these findings have been misquoted and misinterpreted throughout human communication seminars worldwide.

== Attitudes and congruence ==
According to Mehrabian, when a person communicates feelings, the three elements of the message—words, tone of voice, and facial expression—contribute differently to how much others like the person. Specifically, words account for 7%, tone of voice for 38%, and facial expression for 55% of the liking.

For effective communication about emotions, these three parts of the message need to align or be "congruent." If there is any incongruence, where the verbal and non-verbal cues contradict each other, the receiver might be confused or irritated by the conflicting messages.

The following example should help illustrate incongruence in verbal and non-verbal communication.

- Verbal: "I do not have a problem with you!"
- Non-verbal: person avoids eye contact, looks anxious, etc.

It becomes more likely that the receiver will trust the predominant form of communication, which to Mehrabian's findings is the non-verbal impact of tone+facial expression (38% + 55%), rather than the literal meaning of the words (7%). This is known as "the 7%-38%-55% Rule".

It's important to note that Mehrabian's experiments focused specifically on communications of feelings and attitudes (like-dislike). The disproportionate influence of tone of voice and facial expression becomes significant mainly in ambiguous situations, where the words spoken are inconsistent with the tone of voice or facial expression of the speaker.

== Misinterpretation ==
The "7%-38%-55%" rule has often been misinterpreted, leading to the claim that in any communication, the meaning of a message is conveyed mainly by non-verbal cues rather than by the meaning of words. However, this generalization stems from the specific conditions of Mehrabian's experiments and is a common mistake in applying his rule. For further details, references 286 and 305 in Silent Messages are cited as the original sources of Mehrabian's findings. On his website, Mehrabian clarifies the following equation:

Total Liking = 7% Verbal Liking + 38% Vocal Liking + 55% Facial Liking" and other similar equations were derived from experiments specifically focused on the communication of feelings and attitudes (i.e., like–dislike). Therefore, unless a communicator is discussing their feelings or attitudes, these equations are not applicable.

== Criticism ==
The "7%-38%-55%" rule is based on two studies reported in the 1967 papers "Decoding of Inconsistent Communications", and "Inference of Attitudes from Nonverbal Communication in Two Channels". Both studies focused on the communication of positive or negative emotions using single spoken words, such as "dear" or "terrible." The first study compared the relative importance of the semantic meaning of the word with the tone of voice and found that the latter was much more influential. The second study dealt with facial expressions (shown in black-and-white photographs) and vocal tone (as heard in a tape recording) and found that the relative contributions of the two communication channels had a ratio of 3:2. Mehrabian combined the results of these two studies to derive the ratio 7:38:55 for the relative importance of words, tone of voice, and facial expressions in conveying feelings and attitudes.

The study's applicability to real-life situations has several limitations that are often overlooked when the study is cited outside of a scientific context, contributing to potential misinterpretation. First, the study is based on the interpretation of the meaning of a single tape of recorded words, which creates a very artificial context. Second, the figures are derived from combining results from two different studies, which may not be appropriate. Third, the study only relates to the communication of positive versus negative emotions. Fourth, the study only included women, as men did not participate, which limits its generalizability. Fifth, other forms of nonverbal communication, such as body posture, were not considered in the studies. These limitations should be considered when interpreting the findings of the study.

Subsequent studies have examined the relative impact of verbal and nonverbal signals in more natural settings. For example, a study in 1970 used video tapes to analyze the communication of submissive/dominant attitudes and found that all types of nonverbal cues, particularly body posture, had a 4.3 times greater impact than verbal cues. In contrast, a study in 1992 focused on the communication of happy/sad moods and discovered that hearing words spoken in a "flat" voice was approximately four times more influential than facial expressions seen in a silent film. These findings highlight the variability in conclusions that different studies may reach, depending on their methodologies.

== See also ==
- PAD emotional state model
- Bandwagon effect
