= NECA Show =

- Genre: Electrical Construction
- Venue: Walter E. Washington Convention Center, Washington, D.C.
- Location: Washington, D.C. (2013)
- Inaugurated: 1901
- Attendance: 5,500 (cumulative)
- Organizer: National Electrical Contractors Association
- Website: https://www.necaconvention.org

As the #1 event for electrical professionals, the NECA annual convention and trade show, National Electrical Contractors Association draws attendees and exhibitors involved in all aspects of the electrical construction and integrated building systems industries. The NECA Show is open to the entire industry, and it is held in conjunction with the NECA Convention, which is primarily for NECA member firms.

The 2012 convention and trade show was held in Las Vegas, September 29 - October 2, 2012 at the Mandalay Bay, and had a cumulative participation of 5,500, including over 300 companies in over 700 exhibit booths. In 2011, the NECA Show was held in San Diego on October 22 - 25, 2011 at the San Diego Convention Center. In 2010, the NECA show was held in Boston (October 2-5) . The 2013 NECA National Convention & Show will be October 12 - 15 in Washington DC. at the Walter E. Washington Convention Center.

== History ==
The National Electrical Contractors Association (NECA) has been holding conventions since the association's inception in 1901. The first convention was held in July 1901 in Buffalo, NY. Annual conventions have been held every year since, save three years; Conventions were canceled in 1933 & 1934, at the depth of the Great Depression, and in 2005 when the show, planned for New Orleans, was prevented by Hurricane Katrina.

Trade Show Executive magazine named the NECA Show as one of the 2012 Fastest Growing Trade Shows in the US, in two out of three categories; "By Number of Exhibiting Companies" and "By Number of Attendees". The NECA Show was outsourced to HFI Event Services beginning in 2009. HFI is responsible for the exhibit sales, sponsorship sales, management, and operations of the annual event.

== Exhibitors ==
Also known as America's leading power system, lighting & cabling exposition, the NECA Show brings manufacturers and distributors with a wide array of products and services including:

Alarm / Signal Systems, Back-up Power, Boxes & Enclosures, Building Automation & Controls, Codes, Standards & Certifications, Computer Hardware & Equipment, Conduit, Raceway, Cable Tray, Connections & Terminators, Distributors, Energy Efficiency, Estimating, Fasteners Hangers Clamps & Supports, Fire & Life Safety, Grounding & Bonding, Heavy Equipment, Home Automation, Ladders & Lifts, Lighting & Controls, Low Voltage / Voice Data Video, Motor & Motor Controls, Online & Web Services, Outdoor Products, National Electrical Code, Power Quality & Distribution, Safety Equipment & Apparel, Scaffold & Platforms, Security, Services: Financial / Insurance / other, Site Equipment, Software, Solar Energy / PV, Structured Wire & Cable, Testing Equipment, Tools, Training, Transformers, Transmission & Distribution, Underground Equipment, Vehicles & Vehicle Equipment, Wind Energy

== Education Opportunities ==
At the NECA convention and trade show, attendees have numerous opportunities for education and leadership training in areas such as advocacy, best practices, competitive edge, labor relations, networking, and standards.

In addition, show exhibitors can contribute to education sessions by hosting “Technical Workshops” right on the trade show floor. These sessions allow attendees to learn about the industry's new products, services, and programs.

== Future NECA Shows ==
2009: Seattle, September 12–15
2010: Boston, October 2-5
2011: San Diego, October 22-25
2012: Las Vegas, September 30-October 3
2013: Washington DC, October 12-15
2014: Chicago, October 11-14
2015: San Francisco, October 3-6
2016: Boston, October 8-11
2017: Seattle, October 7-10
2022: Austin, Oct. 15 - 18
2023: Philadelphia, Sept. 30 - Oct. 3
2024: San Diego, Sept.28 - Oct. 1
2025: Chicago, Sept. 12-14

== About NECA ==
NECA, the National Electrical Contractors Association, is the trade association and voice of the $130 billion/year electrical construction industry that brings power, light, and communications technology to buildings and communities across the United States. NECA has 4,500 member organizations and produces approximately 250 annual training, continuing education, and business-management events. NECA also has substantial publishing interests, including ELECTRICAL CONTRACTOR magazine, the leading publication for the industry's decision-makers who account for 90 percent of industry purchasing volume.
