= Face Animation Parameter =

Part of the MPEG-4 face animation standard developed by the Moving Picture Experts Group

A Face Animation Parameter (FAP) is a component of the MPEG-4 Face and Body Animation (FBA) International Standard (ISO/IEC 14496-1 & -2) developed by the Moving Pictures Experts Group. It describes a standard for virtually representing humans and humanoids in a way that adequately achieves visual speech intelligibility as well as the mood and gesture of the speaker, and allows for very low bitrate compression and transmission of animation parameters. FAPs control key feature points on a face model mesh that are used to produce animated visemes and facial expressions, as well as head and eye movement. These feature points are part of the Face Definition Parameters (FDPs) also defined in the MPEG-4 standard.

FAPs represent 66 displacements and rotations of the feature points from the neutral face position, which is defined as: mouth closed, eyelids tangent to the iris, gaze and head orientation straight ahead, teeth touching, and tongue touching teeth. These FAPs were designed to be closely related to human facial muscle movements. In addition to animation, FAPs are used in automatic speech recognition, and biometrics.
