= Brooklyn Immersionists =

1990s interdisciplinary ecological art movement in Brooklyn, New York City

The Brooklyn Immersionists were a community of artists, musicians and writers which worked in the Williamsburg neighborhood of Brooklyn, New York, starting in the late 1980s until the late 1990s. The movement focused on ecology, connections across disciplines, and neighborhood communities, rejecting the more formalized categorization of the Manhattan arts scene. This post-postmodern movement contributed to the revitalization of Williamsburg’s industrial waterfront, and also influenced Bushwick, DUMBO, and the rest of Brooklyn.

As the art and music historian, Cisco Bradley, said in 2023:

"Immersionism was the next stage of evolution of the New York art scene... Williamsburg had ample space, which allowed immersionist forms of art to take root in huge postindustrial spaces. The spaces were considerably larger than the jazz lofts had been and could accommodate a scale of projects and audiences not seen since the first SoHo artists lofts in the 1950s and 1960s.”

The end of the Immersionist era coincided with the City of New York’s sponsorship of corporate development in Williamsburg. Most of the members of the Immersionist community were low income renters and could not afford rising housing costs, and a majority were forced to leave the neighborhood they had helped revive.

== Overview ==
=== Activities and cultural role ===
The Immersionist movement began in the early nineties. Publications during the decade noted the increasing importance and visibility of the Williamsburg-based movement. BKMag noted its founding date as 1989.

By the 1990s, the movement's interdisciplinary events and environmental philosophies were being documented by press and arts journals, including The Village Voice, The New York Press, New York Magazine, The Drama Review, Performing Arts Journal (PAJ), Flash Art, Wired, The New York Times, The New Yorker, The Utne Reader, Domus, The Guggenheim Museum CyberAtlas, Die Zeit, Newsweek, and Fuji Television. Art history books that have discussed the movement include Jonathan Fineberg's Art since 1940: Strategies of Being (Prentice Hall), Contemporary Artists edited by Sara and Tom Pendergast (St. James Press), and Cisco Bradley's The Williamsburg Avant-Garde (Duke University Press).

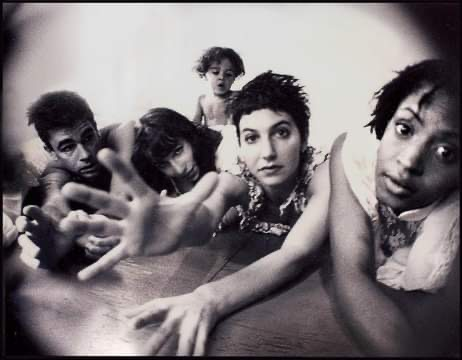
Living connection as primary aesthetic: Melanie Hahn Roche and Dancers at the Flytrap warehouse immersion in Williamsburg, 1991. Bottom, right to left: Keita Whitten, Melanie Hahn Roche and Stavit Allweis. Elijah Whitten in the back.

The neighborhood-based movement attracted thousands of artists to Williamsburg, eventually transforming New York's most intractable case of industrial recession in the 20th century.

The Immersionists and activists in the community built local artists organizations, art installations, exhibition sites, and performance venues.

Writing about the Lizard's Tail cabaret in 1990, the New York Times said, "The club is unpretentious and serves the neighborhood." In 1991 the New York Press said the waterfront community engaged in "esthetic activism" related to artistiv events and shows.

According to artist Melanie Hahn in a journal article for Drama Review, the Williamsburg scene's warehouse parties were organized with trust and hard work by a small circle of friends and organizers who funded and organized events at personal expense.

Williamsburg's ecosystem consisting of dilapidated industry and a weed-strewn, rewilding waterfront influenced the creative community.

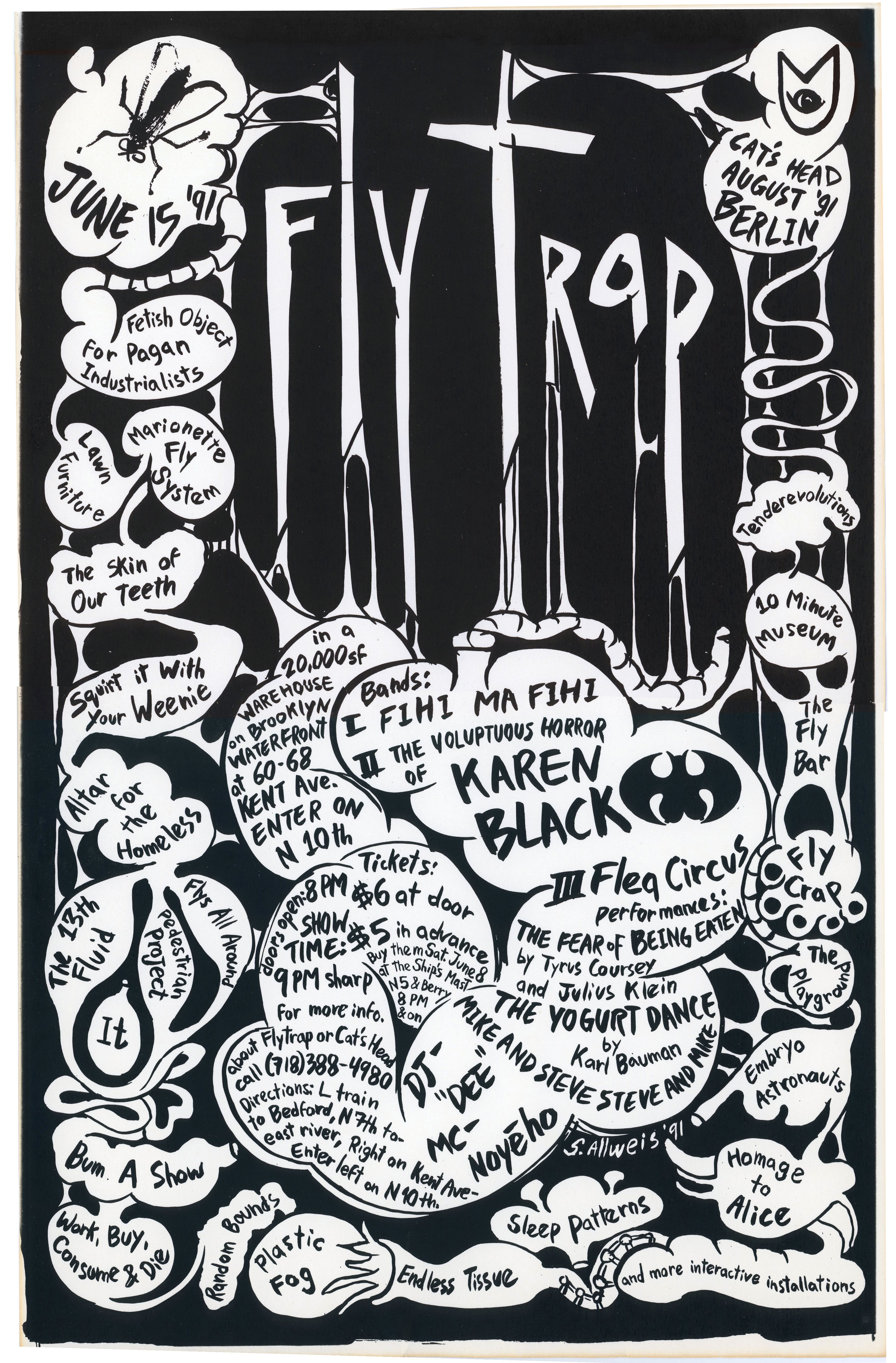
Biological interconnection: Poster by Stavit Allweis for Flytrap, a large warehouse immersion on the waterfront, 1991.

Their artistic expression arose somewhat from the punk subculture and other U.S. counterculture movements.

Separated by the East River from Manhattan's arts establishments, the Immersionists rejected the neighboring borough's postmodernism, and began to employ collective strategies of creation and a visceral relationship with their immediate world.

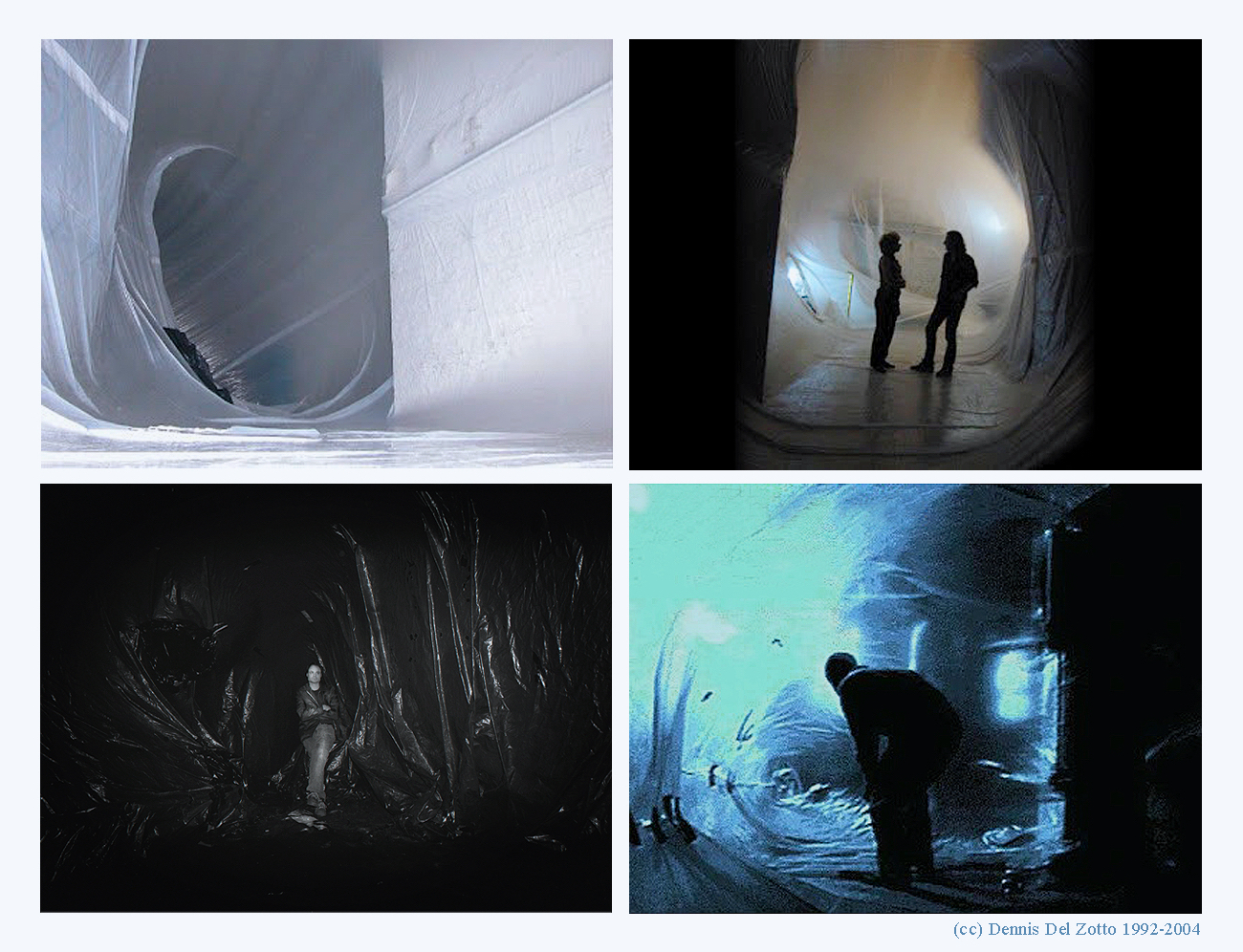
Environmental skin: Inflatables by AirZotto (Dennis Del Zotto) situated around Williamsburg, Brooklyn, 1990s

By 1998, Suzanne Wines was describing Williamsburg's creative community in Domus as "immersive" and "New York's most vibrant art scene... constantly responding to new input.” In his book, The Williamsburg Avant-Garde: Experimental Music and Sound on the Brooklyn Waterfront, Cisco Bradley describes the unusual integration of living things, living systems and recycled machinery from the waterfront that was being explored at an area nightclub exhibit. According to Bradley, the community not only shifted the center of New York's creativity towards Brooklyn, but significantly helped to change the discourse of the arts in New York to living immersion.

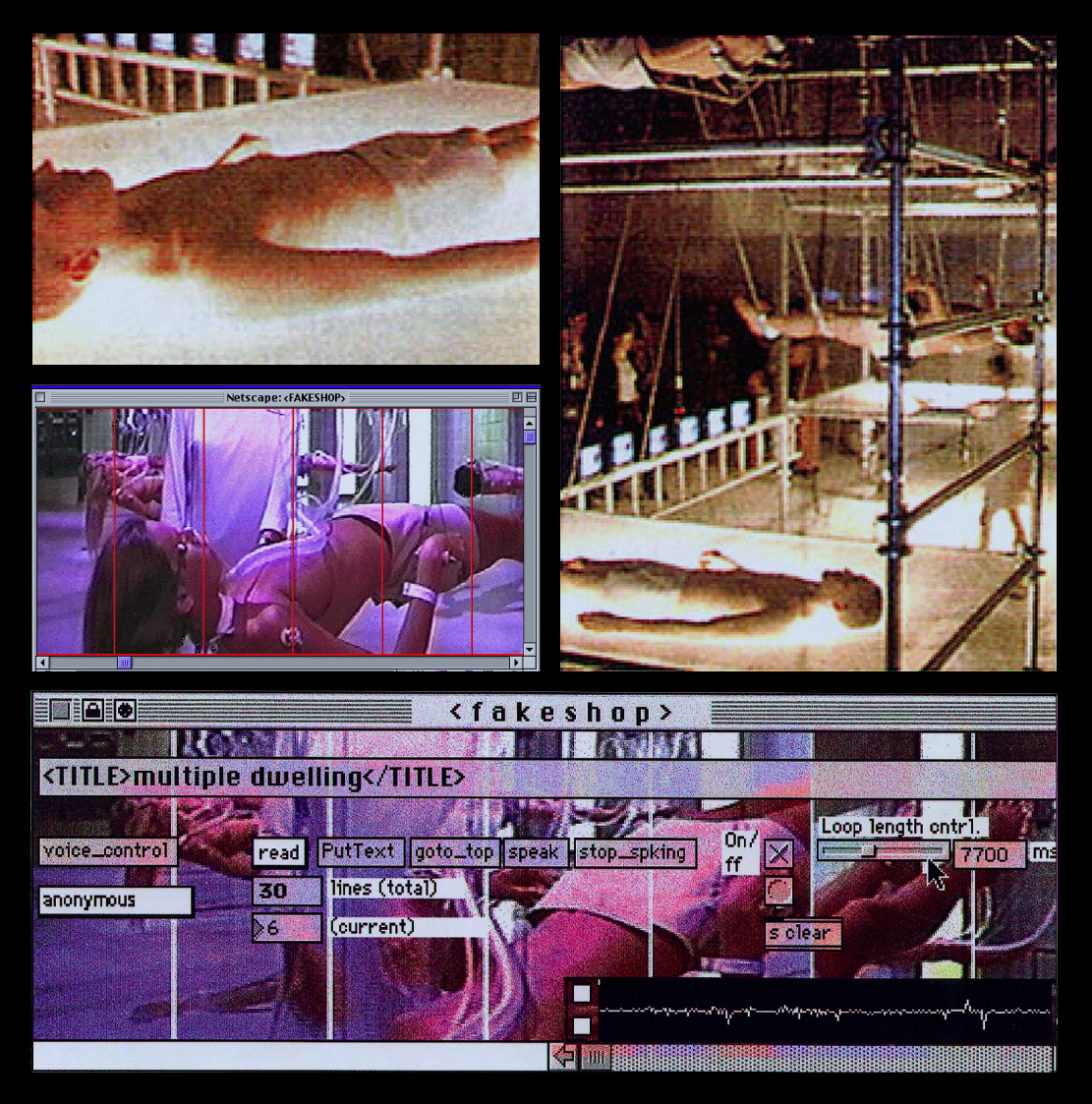
Fakeshop's Multiple Dwelling, Williamsburg, Brooklyn 1998.

=== Conflict with affluent real estate developers ===
After a decade of activity, the Immersionist community and its activist neighbors helped to revive Williamsburg and its local businesses. According to a 2004 report in the Journal of the American Planning Association, the inclusive, dynamic culture brought down the rate of attrition for Williamsburg's disadvantaged in the 1990s.

In 1992 Waterfront Week took a formal stand against the city's plans to privilege developers over residents. Endorsed by the zine's founder, Genia Gould, and penned by one of the Green Room's contributors, Rolf Carle, the weekly called for "no new building on the waterfront" and insisted that it "maintain its M3 heavy industrial zoning." M3 allowed for mixed uses of the waterfront area, but not the construction of high rises. Waterfront Week also supported "ecologically correct" industrial zoning and took a stand against an array of potential polluting industries: "No incinerators, no garbage transfer stations, no sludge factories that the city would like to see and we as a community would not like to smell." The weekly also called for existing buildings to be renovated and "recycling centers and alternative energy stations developed."

In 1999 New York City's Board of Standards and Appeals granted a zoning variance that allowed for an apartment complex to be built on Kent Avenue near the river. This was the first of dozens of high-rises to be supported by the government through rezoning and billions of dollars in tax abatements. These new high rises and chain stores began to overwhelm the locally rooted economy and the area's culture.

According to Freeman and Braconi, Mayor Michael R. Bloomberg 's corporate welfare policies caused the attrition rates for economically disadvantaged populations to rise again after the creative community had lowered it.

According to a 2004 report by Lance Freeman and Frank Braconi in the Journal of the American Planning Association, "rather than rapid displacement, gentrification was associated with slower residential turnover among these households. In New York City, during the 1990s at least, normal succession appears to be responsible for changes in gentrifying neighborhoods."

In 2010 The Guardian described Williamsburg as being at the "front line of the gentrification battle". In 2014, the New York Times noted how an influx of artists would often transform Brooklyn neighborhoods, noting how “the New York City borough most known for its citizens' desire to be counterculture... would be co-opted by entrepreneurs looking to sell the 'Brooklyn brand' abroad.” In 2019, Henry Grabar wrote an article for Slate Magazine titled "What Do We Call It When the Rich Displace the Middle Class? It's not gentrification!"

Alanna Schubach places the blame on city policy. In her article, "Stop blaming the hipsters: Here's how gentrification really happens," she states that "The roots of the phenomenon reach way back through history and public policy."

== Initial ideas and creative work ==
=== Neighborhood as artistic medium ===
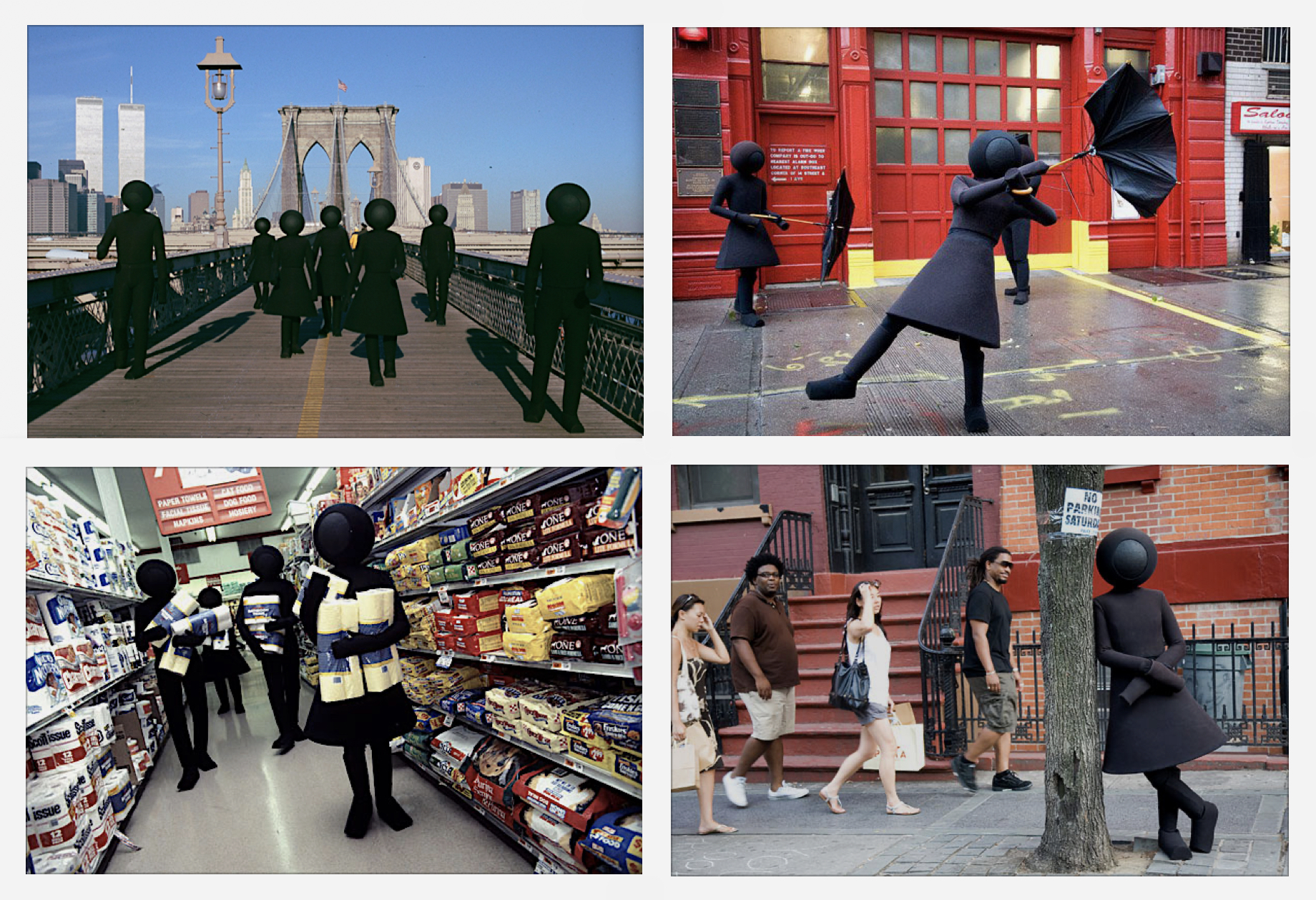
Immersive urban theater: The Pedestrian Project in Brooklyn directed by Yvette Helin, 1990s.

The Immersionists began to cultivate a web of interpenetrating creativity where they lived. They turned the streets, rooftops, warehouses and weed-strewn waterfront into both medium and source of inspiration. Curator Brainard Carey said i 2016:

"The creative community that came together during the early 1990s in Williamsburg, now referred to as the Immersionists, shared a common interest in cultural innovation and deep involvement in their local environment."

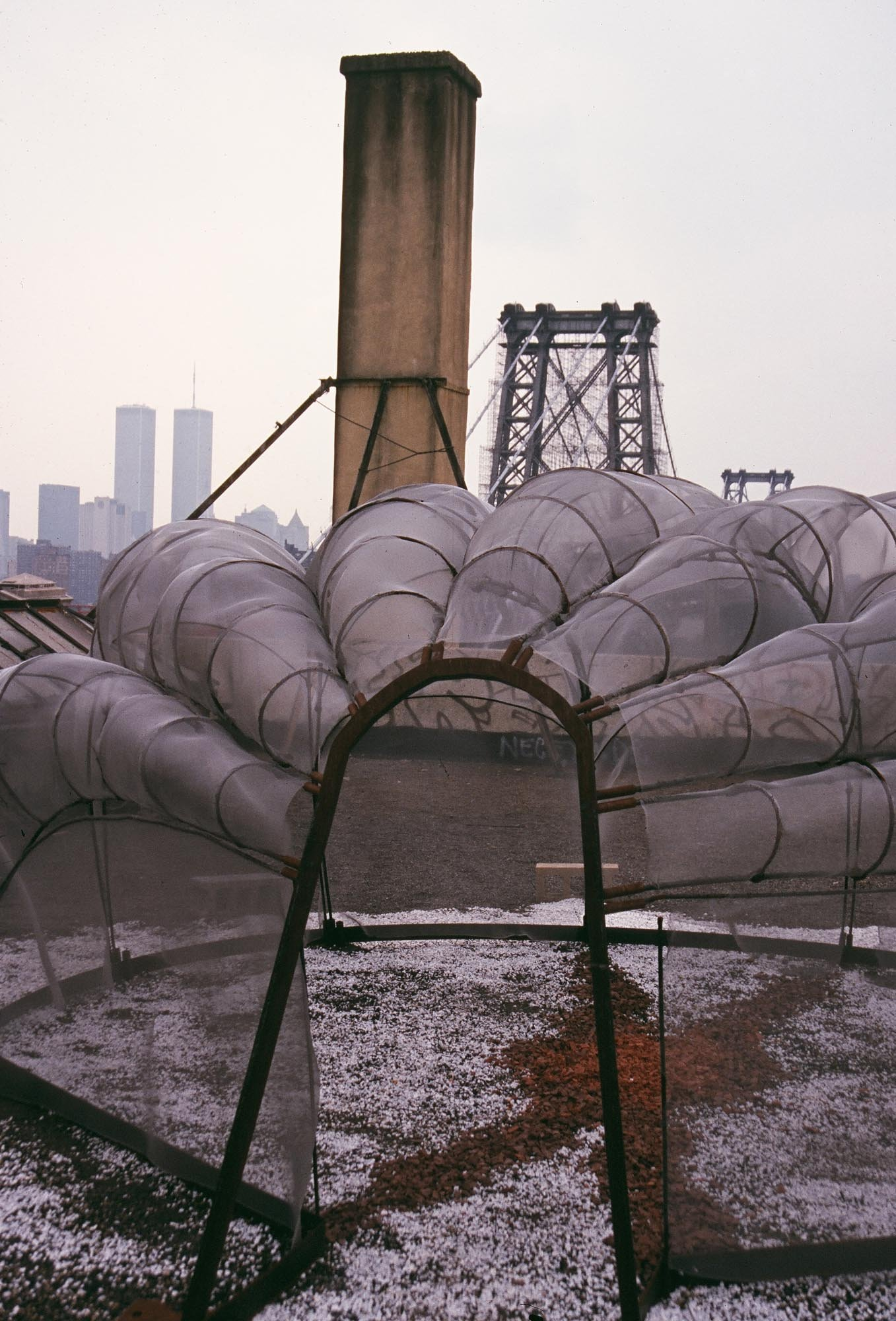
Dialogue space on the roof: Shell Sanctuary, a rooftop installation on Berry Street by Rosa Valado, 1998

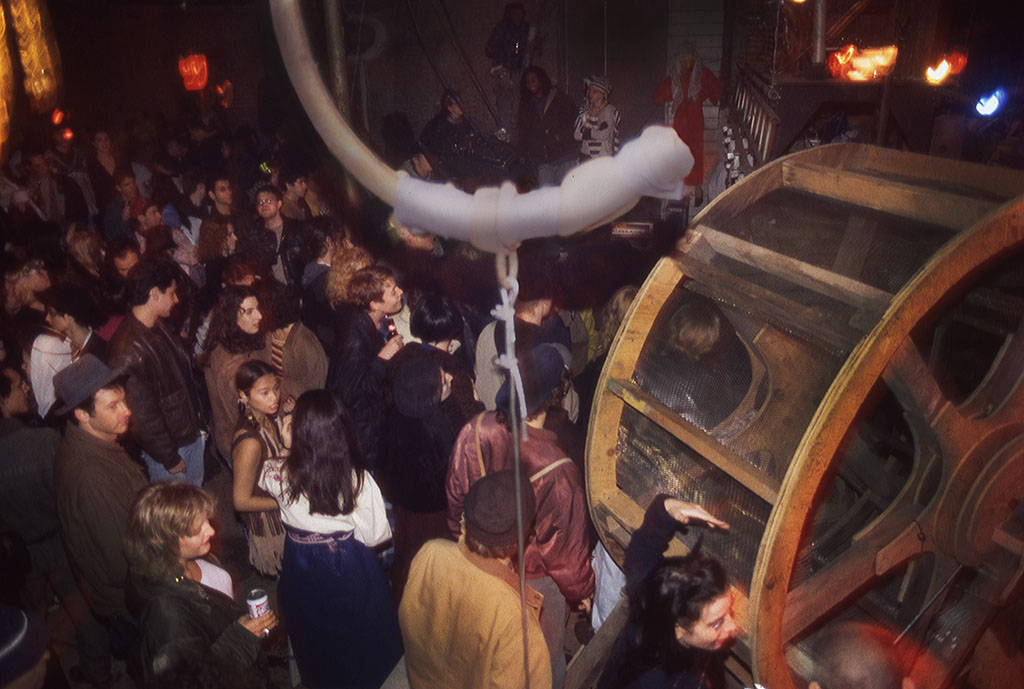
An audience circulates among the creations: Crash Worship at Mustard in the Old Dutch Mustard Factory, 1993.

Much of Williamsburg’s industrial area near the waterfront was turned into a medium of expression, with increasingly large interdisciplinary events in the abandoned warehouses attracting attention from a wide variety of media. The multidisciplinary press helped to articulate the emerging Immersionist philosophy of immersive, collective event formation, community engagement and acute awareness of their surrounding ecosystem. In a vivid embrace of their post-industrial district, the artists moved the locus of attention away from the paradigm of the solitary artist and into the nurturing of a shared world. A biological and environmental orientation was evident in the community’s nomenclature: groups and art collectives emerged that often invoked animals, ecosystems and healing in their names and manifestoes.

One of the earliest of Williamsburg's creative organizations, El Puente (The Bridge) opened in 1982 and referenced its commitment to deep, restorative connection to local youth. A student group which emerged out of El Puente, the Toxic Avengers, even referenced the notoriously toxic nature of their own industrial environment. Beginning in 1990 with The Sex Salon, a playful nod to animal sensuality, a series of large, community-building efforts in the streets and abandoned warehouses also signaled a devotion to the living world. The Sex Salon was followed by the Cat's Head (I & II), Flytrap, Human Fest (I & II), El Sensorium and Organism. Strategies for these events and spaces used equally biomorphic terms like “circuitous systems," “omnisensorial,” techno-organic and “web jam.” Storefront venues and mobile enterprises began to emerge in parallel with the large, creative confluxes, and shared in the community-building philosophy: Minor Injury Gallery, The Bog, The Lizard's Tail, Nerve Circle, Keep Refrigerated, the Green Room, Fakeshop, Lalalandia, Bindlestiff Family Circus, Circus Amok, the Outpost, and Hit and Run Theater. Local media emerged that helped to build a discourse around participation, biological feedback systems, and ecological sensitivity. These included Breukelen, The Curse, The Nose, The Outpost, Waterfront Week, Worm Magazine and (718) Subwire.

In the mid 1990s, interdisciplinary establishments appeared that followed in both the biomorphic naming tradition and the locally rooted, interactive culture: Mustard, The AlulA Dimension, Floating Point Unit, Galapagos, Ocularis, Ovni 360° and Ongolia. Migration of artists and musicians between groups was extensive, leading to a rich weave of ideas and resources.

The Immersionist philosophy of environmental engagement had vivid consequences. Deep involvement with their neighborhood gradually grew into a wave of cultural change and small business growth that transformed the entire borough. According to Lance Freeman and Frank Braconi in the Journal of the American Planning Association, the sense of hope that returned to the struggling industrial district helped to lower the attrition rates for the disadvantaged in the 1990s. As has been noted, a non-local philosophy of monopoly takeover supported by New York’s City Hall in Manhattan had the opposite result: attrition rates began to go up in the new millennium.

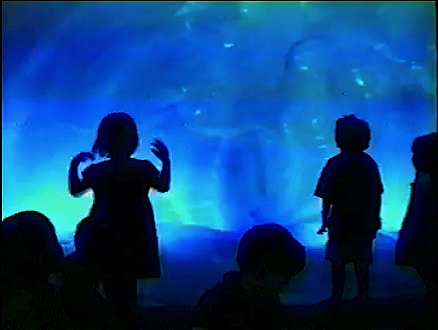
Children inside Blue Inflatable at El Sensorium, Williamsburg, Brooklyn, 1992. Permission to share provided by Lalalandia to ShipsMastHub.

The international “artists colony”, as the German newspaper, Die Zeit referred to the Immersionist scene, was composed of immigrants from across the Americas, Africa, Asia, Europe and the Middle East.

=== Collective environmental context ===
Where André Breton believed Surrealism could draw the unconscious into human affairs and begin to “resolve the previously contradictory conditions of dream and reality”, the Immersionists opened up a three way flow between consciousness, the subconscious and their environment. They treated their entire psycho-physical world as a living continuum of being. In an early hint at an ecological sensibility, a 1988 Nerve Circle manifesto by Ebon Fisher, You Sub Mod, ruminated on a nonobjective fusion with the world or “burrow”:

“To immerse yourself was the thing, sensing that objectivity was only another dream”.

In a similar spirit of deep ecological immersion, the arts space, Epoché published an editorial in Word of Mouth in 1989 that encouraged the creative community to “inject vitality” into their distressed, industrial world. This gave rise to a three day convergence of poets, artists, filmmakers and musicians at Epoché called The Sex Salon that launched on Valentine's Day, 1990. Five months later the Lizard's Tail Cabaret convened another large interdisciplinary gathering in the Old Dutch Mustard Factory, The Cat's Head, which was promoted as a “multidimensional convergence.”

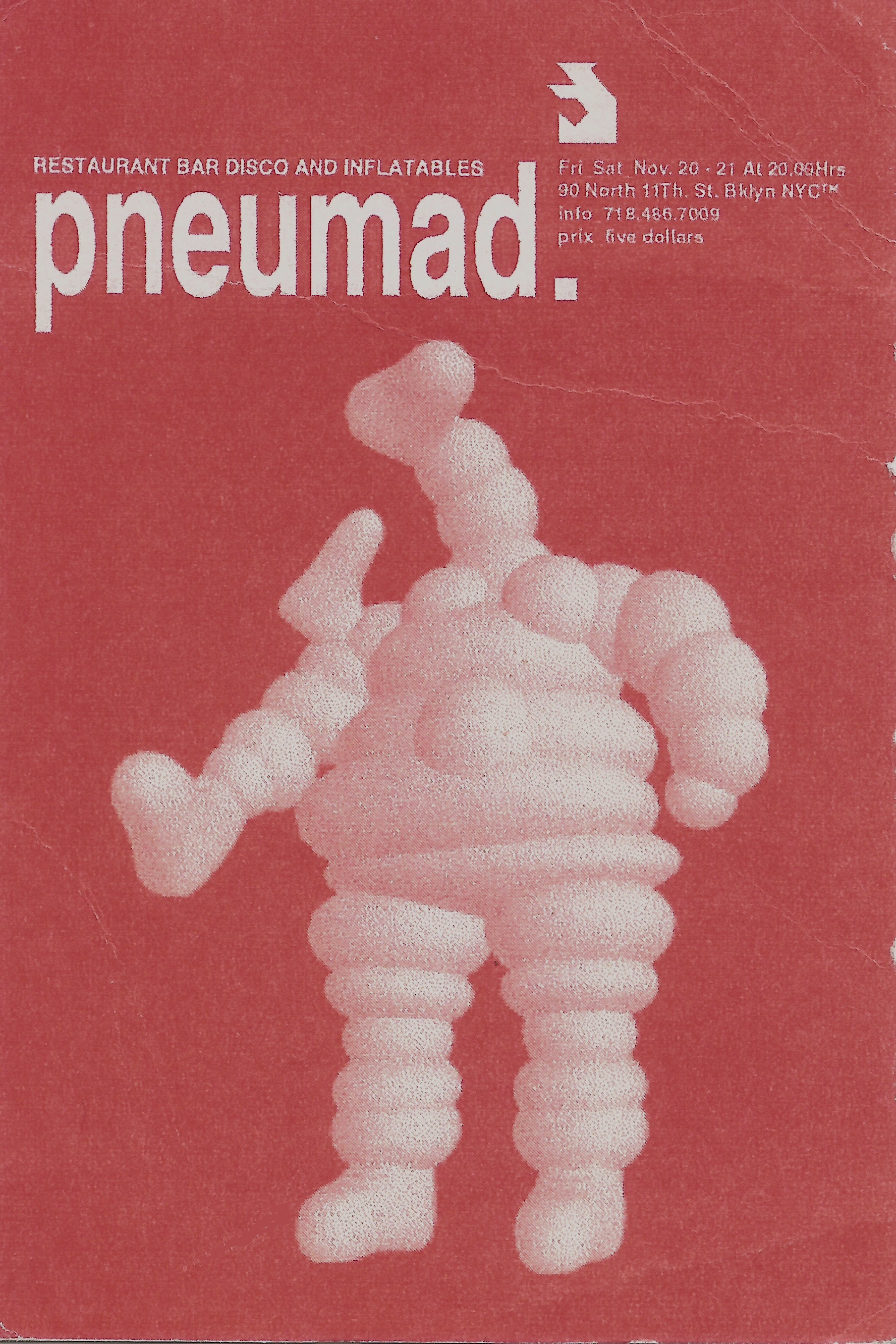
Omnisensorial Madness. Pneumad poster for Ongolia event, Williamsburg, Brooklyn, 1999. Graphic by Ignacio Platas.

In another form of convergence with their environment a couple years later, a collective of artists and musicians opened up the night space Keep Refrigerated, which left the original meat packing architecture largely intact. With roots in Keep Refrigerated, the Lalalandia collective integrated recycled materials from the local factories into a richly woven, “omnisensorial” night space called El Sensorium. Since all these immersive experiments were conducted in one of the country’s most toxic districts, Lalalandia member, Greg Asch was fond of calling their often acerbic aesthetic “illbient.” Another spinoff of Keep Refrigerated, Fakeshop, echoed the illbient approach by immersing audiences and performers in webs of media technology that blurred the lines between humans and machines.

Yvette Helin opened up a performance space with Rube Fenwick whose very name, the Green Room, evoked a relationship with nature. Helin also explored relationships between her street performers, The Pedestrian Project, and their environment. Some of the solo performers who made the entire neighborhood their stage – including local community meetings and protest marches – would make the Green Room one of their bases. These ubiquitous performers included Andrew Hampsas, Dan McKereghan, Gene Pool, Medea de Vyse and Miss Kitty. Given that their industrial world was coping with toxic waste and economic decline, Laurel Casey echoed Greg Asch’s “illbient” with the phrase, “sacred dump”.

As a philosophy of extended being, creative immersion in their environment was not limited to the streets and crumbling waterfront of Williamsburg. Prescient social media projects emerged in the 1990s that immersed audiences in a hybrid of media, environment and sensual, physical activity. These included the richly embodied and interactive media confluxes of Nerve Circle, Lalalandia and Fake Shop; AirZotto’s sheet plastic caves; the Outpost Media Collective’s rooftop garden gatherings; Floating Cinema’s film screenings from a barge on the East River; and the Ocularis Film Collective’s screenings on the roof of Galapagos Art Space. Galapagos also featured a dark reflecting pool inside its entrance area, and immersed audiences in seating systems which floated over an even larger pool at its next incarnation in DUMBO, Brooklyn.

==== Major gatherings with multiple artists and installations ====
One of the largest Immersionist gatherings in the early 1990s, Organism turned nearly all of the Old Dutch Mustard Factory into an experiment in organic interconnection. Conceived by Ebon Fisher as an ecological “web jam,” the 15 hour event involved a weave of systems cultivated by 120 artists, musicians and architects in collaboration with their environment. As stated in the program notes, “The Organism is an attempt to push the idea of linkage, collaboration and interaction to its mellifluous, weblike extreme.” Many of Williamsburg's prominent Immersionist groups came together to launch the event, including veterans of Minor Injury Gallery, the Cat's Head and Flytrap gatherings, Nerve Circle, Epoché, Keep Refrigerated, and the Green Room. Several bands also brought musical webs to the project, including Thrust, Fric and Frac, FBI and the Hungry March Band. Students from the immersive educational group, El Puente, also joined in the creation of the event. Organism ultimately drew in over 2000 visitors and was characterized by Wines in Domus as “a symbolic climax to the renegade activity that had been stirring within the community since the late eighties.” Underscoring the biological nature of the creation, she described it as “breathing and transforming for fifteen hours in an abandoned mustard factory.” Citing the large "immersive environments" in the abandoned warehouses, and an array of social-environmental experiments by Lalalandia, Fakeshop, Floating Point Unit, Ovni, Ongolia and Nerve Circle, Wines notes in Domus that an innovative sensibility had emerged in Williamsburg that involved the cultivation of living systems and experiences rather than solid works of art and architecture.

The Brooklyn Immersionists were not only immersing audiences in sensuous environments. As their extensive commentary in local zines like Worm and Waterfront Week indicate, sharing their creations, events and media with their neighbors and other artists helped to nurture ecological relationships between the audience, the artists’ imaginative unconscious, and their shared urban ecosystem. These ecological relationships and shared subjective ecosystems are also far richer and more fluid than simple social networks. They have been described as a "venture into the waters" by Stavit Allweis and Lauren Szold in a 1991 Worm editorial. Other terms for ecological immersion appeared in the neighborhood literature like Jessica Nissen’s “circuitous systems” and Nerve Circle's “web jam.” Lalalandia's house band, MultiPolyOmni even encoded extensive ecological being into its name. Open Window Theater drew its audiences both onto and into its sets. One such production, Franz Kafka's The Hunger Artist, involved a structure built by the artist and writer, David Brody who later oversaw immersive video systems for Organism with Carlton Bright.

==== Immersionist discourse ====
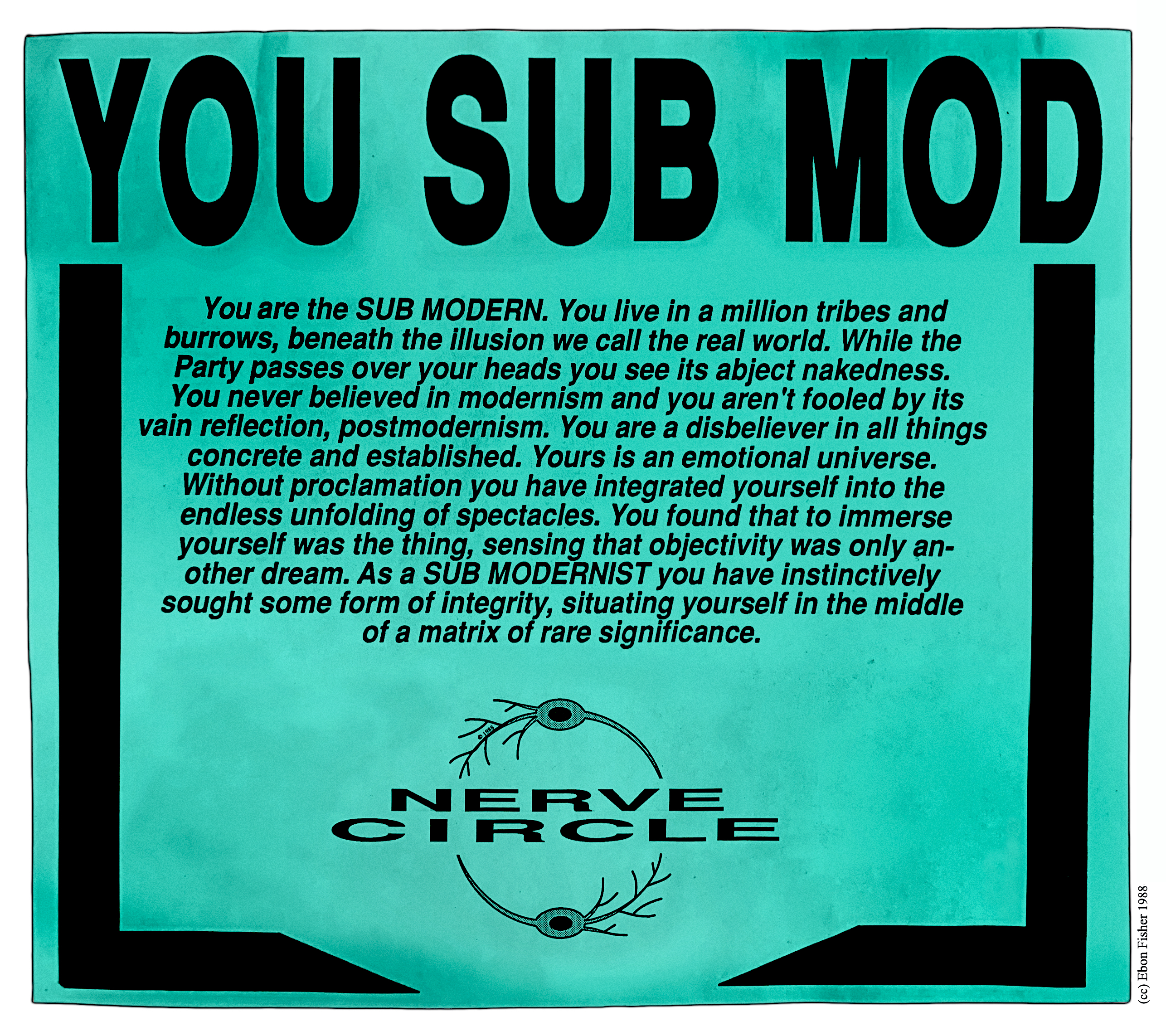
Submodern immersion: You Sub Mod, 1988, by Ebon Fisher, director of the systems theater company, Nerve Circle. The manifesto includes the phrase “to immerse yourself was the thing."

Although the waterfront community's fusion of mental, social and physical realms eventually led to a consensus online to use the umbrella label, "Immersionism," the interdisciplinary community spoke of many different forms of immersion. Their terms included "circuitous systems" (Jessica Nissen), "close-to-the-pulse" (Genia Gould, Breukelen), "endless tissue" and “to immerse yourself was the thing” (Ebon Fisher, Nerve Circle), "environmental improv" (Yvette Helin, Green Room), "everybody does everything" (Alejandra Giudici, Lalalandia), "to gain a sensitivity" (Jeff Gompertz, Fake Shop), "globs of desires" (Laurel Casey, Waterfront Week), "publishing network" (Kit Blake, Worm), "a very alive whole" (Kelly Webb, Thrust), "omnisensorial" (Lalalandia), and "vibrate" (Anna Hurwitz, co-producer of the Cats Heads, Flytrap, Organism and Mustard).

Although theorists in the arts and social sciences became increasingly interested in the emotional value of living social networks after the Brooklyn Immersionists transformed Williamsburg, Immersionism remains a gold standard due to the ecological depth of its theory and culture, and the transformative impact it had on a neighborhood that had lost thousands of industrial jobs overseas. Indeed, a timeline of events in Williamsburg by Ward Shelley that has been exhibited in the Brooklyn Museum and discussed in The New York Times, refers to the Immersionist upwelling in the early 1990s as "The Golden Era" of Williamsburg’s revival.

== Immersionist art, performance and aesthetics ==
=== Neighborhood contexts for creative works ===
Not to be mistaken for immersive computer games or virtual reality, Immersionism in Williamsburg, Brooklyn emphasized deep participation in the actual neighborhood where the artists lived. According to the art historian, Jonathan Fineberg, Williamsburg's creative community was "returning to immediate experience, to the body, and to a neighborhood cultural interaction". Although the personal computers of the era were used, the technology was largely applied to print publications and integrated into immersive physical architectures and events. The emphasis on year round environmental engagement also distinguished Brooklyn Immersionism from more temporary forms of interactive culture like Fluxus, the Happenings and the Burning Man Festival. Given that their home was on the edge of collapse, it required not just an aesthetic, but an ethic of continuous neighborhood nurturing.

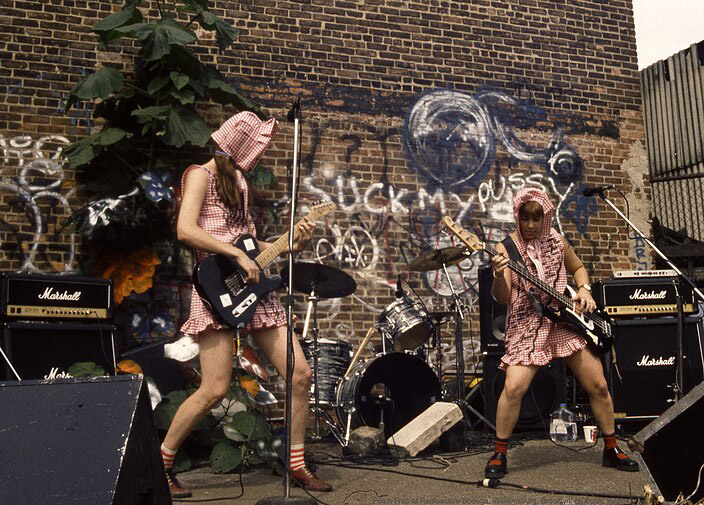
Fric n Frac at Radioactive Bodega. Karen Cormier and Irena Jaroszewski performing in a warehouse depot in 1992. Graffiti of a womb on the wall is by the band, Thrust who also played at the event.

Writing for the London-based Mute Magazine in 1997, Peter Boerboom discusses how a creative practice in Williamsburg emerged from such conditions:

"As you ride the L train beneath the silent weight of the water or cruise over the looming Williamsburg Bridge, you cross a cultural schism. On one side Wall Street's financial engines hum endlessly, on the other empty warehouses and factories lie abandoned. On one side the energy of commerce drives human interaction, while on the other the ethic of neighborhood still binds communities. On one side the established art world is slick and lucrative business, on the other, up from between the cracks in the concrete and through the windows of the abandoned warehouses, grows a vibrant creative community."

In Waterfront Week, Laurel Casey aestheticizes her immersion in Williamsburg's streets and characterizes the district's decrepit condition as sacred. In Casey's work, the traditional rite of immersion, virtual death, and rebirth are played out in a new secular form.

Living in a district on the edge of economic and environmental collapse, art as a form of social activism was prioritized over creating work for isolated venues across the river in Manhattan. Suzan Wines wrote in Domus Magazine of the Immersionists' organic fusion of different art forms, and their sense of place and connection. In his introduction to the exhibit, "Out of Town: The Williamsburg Paradigm", Fineberg described how some of the work reflected the toxic nature of their north Brooklyn home:

“The old motor oil dripping down between the layers of Kit Blake's Oil Curtain and the strange oozing substances in Lauren Szold's drips and pours on the floor also evoke the ominous undertone of North Brooklyn, one of the most polluted pieces of real estate in America (where there is a toxic waste site and a lead level in the soil that exceeds by 500 times the acceptable standard).”

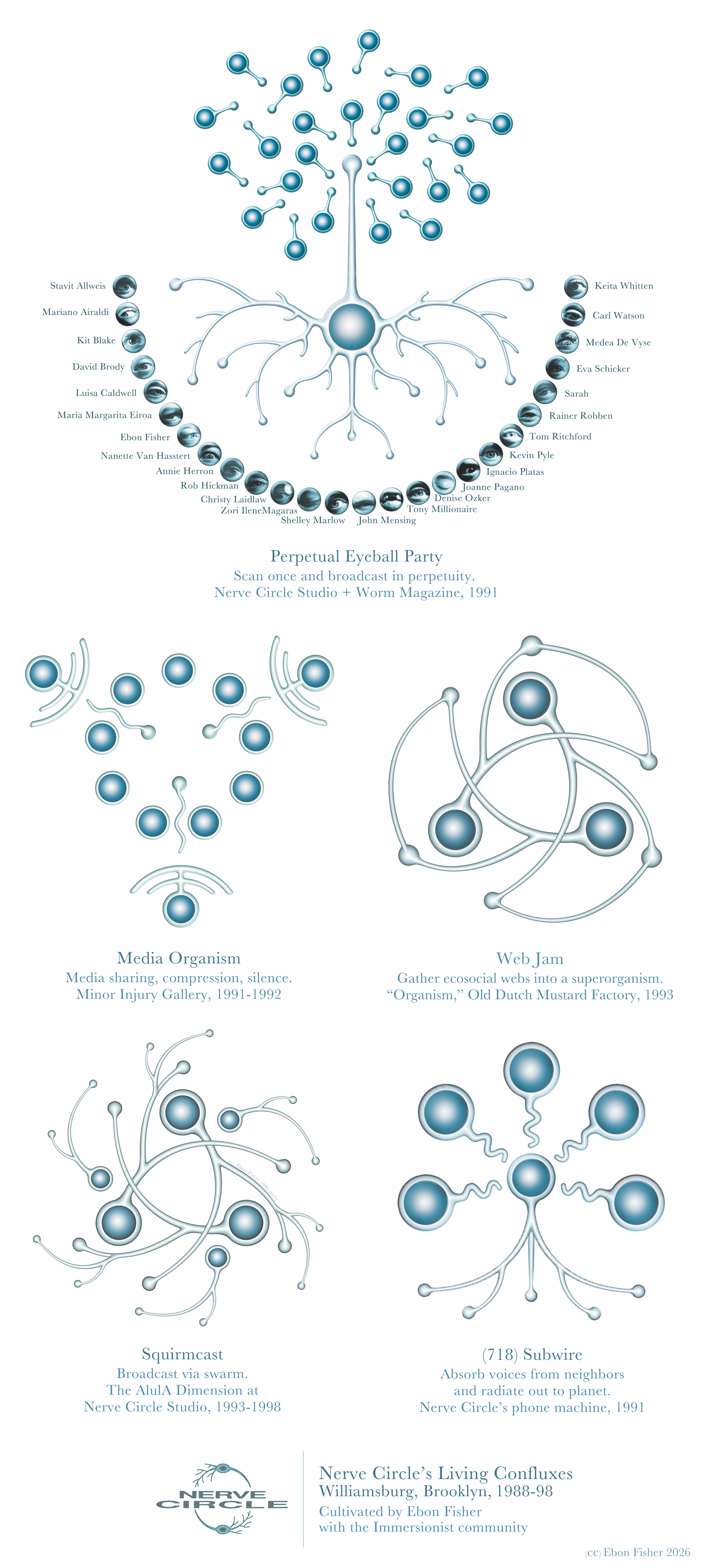
These are schematic diagrams of ecosocial convergences created by Ebon Fisher’s information theater company, Nerve Circle

==== Biological systems metaphor ====
In connection with the district's toxic conditions, Fineberg was also struck by the creative community's "recourse to biological metaphors." Beginning with the mischievously titled Sex Salon of 1990, large convergences of music, dance, performance and installations in Williamsburg's abandoned warehouses and streets employed a language of healing, rebirth and animal vitality. Interactivity and feedback, a fundamental property of living things, were popular strategies in the neighborhood, rising to the level of a primary aesthetic. Hit and Run Theater emphasized a visceral, almost animal, interaction with the public. Other immersive theater companies like Floating Point Unit, Nerve Circle and the Institute for Aesthetic Modulation (IFAM) actually referenced biofeedback systems in their names. Floating Point Unit (FPU) echoed the mathematics behind feedback-driven "fuzzy logic,” and its director, Jeff Gompertz explored live video feeds in a mesh of interactions on the company’s sets. Nerve Circle's immersive media rituals, such as the Perpetual Eyeball Scanning Party at its loft on Grand Street, and communal "Media Compressions" at Minor Injury Gallery, explored the nurturing properties of communal information synthesis.

Nerve Circle was composed of a director, Ebon Fisher and an evolving set of participants. The art historian Frank Popper said in the book Contemporary Artists that Fisher's goal was to induce a local nervous system by cultivating "the living properties of information" and to nurture collective "media organisms.” Lalalandia used the term "techno-organic" to describe interactions the group had with their social, electronic and physical environment, included the recycling of materials scavenged from Williamsburg's abandoned factories, and creating a network of projects in the neighborhood. Lalalandia maintained a small bus to drive their audiences from one industrial location to another. Kit Blake named Worm Magazine in reference to both a burrowing creature and a digital virus. Both organisms involve environmental penetration and feedback.

Genia Gould, with the help of Ethan Pettit and Rube Fenwick, launched Waterfront Week as a free weekly alternative newspaper in 1991. The paper published letters from the public, casual cut-and-paste advertising, and a comic strip, Medea's Weekend by Tony Millionaire which explored an imaginary version of Williamsburg. Ethan Pettit's alter ego, Medea was both a regular columnist for Waterfront Week, and the namesake for Millionaire's comic strip. Gould also created Breukelen Magazine in 1992 to cover the north Brooklyn area.

As early as January 1990, Ladislav Czernek posted his own public invitation to "inject vitality" into the struggling neighborhood and "to create a meeting place in which an atmosphere of sharing and collaboration is nurtured". Open meetings at Czernek's experimental arts center, Epoché included many members of the fledgling Immersionist community: The Lizard's Tail, Minor Injury, Nerve Circle, Waterfront Week, Word of Mouth and Verge. These meetings led to the launching of the seminal Immersionist event, The Sex Salon. Opening on Valentine's Day 1990, the three-day festival presented works by nearly a hundred artists from a range of disciplines. Celebrating a fluid vision of sexuality, the event attracted hundreds of viewers. As music historian, Cisco Bradley points out, the evocative event was generated through discussion and consensus and "...set the tone for future events, queered the social expectations, and sparked much of the community which followed."

The Sex Salon's playful title underscored the emerging community's desire to engage a public outside academic art circles. Bradley quotes Ebon Fisher who states that the title was “an early indication of the Immersionist’s interest in corporeal connection.” Finding sensuous satisfaction in connecting with their own living world, many Immersionists questioned the late 20th century academic fixation on irony, subversion and deconstruction. Although such a postmodern orientation had emerged after WWII out of a useful critique of industrial society, by the 1980s it had become mired in a perpetual state of critical distance. Punk music and edgy fashion that had emerged from the postmodern milieu had become a commercial style. Making a radical departure from such a Warholian ethos, Williamsburg's creative community near the waterfront began to explore a more visceral and compassionate culture of connection, environmental healing and unique forms of subjective ecology. Brainard Carey said in 2016:

"These young artists, musicians and urbanists made immersion in their immediate world more critical than participation in a remote, and often disappointing 'art world' across the river. Culture, art, entertainment and biological survival fused together into a highly spirited local ecosystem... [The artists were] immersing themselves in a 24-hour matrix of parties, printed matter, urban agriculture, music and gender fluid performances."

In an ardent embrace of everyday life in the neighborhood, creations were often drawn from their environment and completed by their environment. In a reference to women's work traditions, Lauren Szold combined materials from her kitchen and poured them onto the floors of abandoned factories. Her flows of flour, milk, eggs and blood would eventually ferment on location. After studying under the conceptual artist Vito Acconci at SUNY Purchase, Dennis Del Zotto began to explore a form of social fermentation by inserting inflatable pods into various environments. The large, abandoned warehouses in Williamsburg allowed Del Zotto, AKA AirZotto, to create a parallel architecture out of sheet plastic and fans from local hardware stores. Locations also included clubs such as El Sensorium, Fake Shop, Ongolia and Galapagos Art Space. The large, organically elegant bladders were completed by the presence of participants who often spent whole evenings inside them. Echoing the same, raw aesthetic as Szold and Del Zotto, Andrew Hampsas conducted sparse, visceral performances on rooftops, abandoned factory yards and even immersed himself half naked in the East River. As an exploration of animal presence, varying degrees of nudity were also in evidence at enterprises like Keep Refrigerated, Fake Shop, Mustard, Radioactive Bodega, El Sensorium, Galapagos and many of the large warehouse gatherings. In his introduction to the museum exhibit, Out of Town: The Williamsburg Paradigm, the art historian Jonathan Fineberg spoke of the shift to a living, bodily process:

"After twenty-five years of a language-based focus to the art world – hand in hand with the demise of confidence in the ability of 'vanguard' artists to affect culture by showing radical work in SoHo galleries (much less ones in Kreuzberg or the Marais) – many artists today are returning to immediate experience, to the body, and to a neighborhood cultural interaction. As Ebon Fisher, a key figure on the Williamsburg scene recently told me, 'we're not making art out here, we're creating culture.'"

==== Cultivation of actual living systems ====
The cultivation of a culture, however, was not just a project for the human domain. Mutual cultivation between humans and other species was not uncommon. The New Yorker discussed Lalalandia's night space, El Sensorium which featured a bar "covered with topsoil in which lime-green weeds sprout nurtured by a waterfall". The Outpost held gatherings in a rooftop garden which one of its founders, Ruth Kahn had created as a communal oasis. In addition to facilitating local video projects, Kahn cultivated living sculpture out of odd mixes of plants. Gene Pool, who humorously references social biology in his adopted name, had a history of covering objects such as cars and clothing with living rye grass. He joined other Immersionists such as communications artist, Robin Perl and musician and filmmaker, Sasha Sumner in local environmental protests, underscoring the depth of their commitment to local living systems. Pool would often attend these events riding a unicycle and wearing a suit made of salvaged cans which The New York Times described as a "rallying cry for recycling". The author, Matthew Purdy praised Pool's public presence as an extraordinary "ripple in a vast sea of humdrum daily life".

=== Beyond postmodern alienation ===
Many of the Immersionists commuted to Manhattan for work and were familiar with that neighboring borough's deeply rooted arts institutions and practices. What they experienced, however, was not enticing them to endure its more expensive living conditions. It wasn't just the competitive nature of a culture built on solitary expression and the art star market. Manhattan’s cultural paradigms, modernism and postmodernism, seemed to be on the wane and a sense of passion and wide open innovation was missing from the culture. In The Williamsburg Avant-Garde, Cisco Bradley quotes Williamsburg artist and musician DJ Olive (Gregor Asch) on Manhattan’s waning attraction: “Post modernism was cool, but we'd had enough of it. We wanted to build something pure and forward looking, something positive.”

Geographic separation from Manhattan and an immersion in a sparsely populated section of Williamsburg, allowed the new creative community to benefit from what ecologists like Aldo Leopold have called edge effects. Situated in a neutral, industrial space between Manhattan and the wider borough of Brooklyn, and between Polish, Latino and Hassidic neighborhoods, the youthful, international community had breathing room for a diverse set of ideas and values to come together in creative new forms. As the new generation of artists began to absorb Brooklyn's more neighborly ethos, Manhattan's postmodern template began to lose its charm for them. Connecting to the neighborhood, exploring its rewilding waterfront, and contributing to local vitality was simply more gratifying than maintaining an ironic, postmodern discourse with a highly institutionalized “art world” that seemed to shut this new generation out. Furthermore, the struggling artists who were adventurous enough to move to the more bleak and dangerous areas near the waterfront were simply more inclined by nature to explore their new home and seek out a new kind of relationship with it. As Laurel Casey states in The New York Press in 1991, "I craved to share the thrill and horror of it."

The movement away from postmodern distance and towards a connection with the immediate world was not just a theoretical stance. In Word of Mouth as early as 1989, Ladislav Czernek invited the public to his cultural space, Epoché “to feed, and feed off a neighborhood, not just occupy it”. Likewise, the Lizard's Tail's philosophy of “multidimensional convergence”, Lalalandia's "techno-organic" use of recycled materials, and Nerve Circle's cultivation of “media organisms” were deliberate strategies for immersion in a living world. That national and international media outlets such as Newsweek, The Drama Review, Flash Art, Wired, Die Zeit, Domus and Fuji Television would report on the community's new theories of eco-cultural immersion suggests that a new urban think tank was beginning to bypass Manhattan’s cultural industry to influence the larger culture. In his book, Art Since 1940: Strategies of Being, the art historian Jonathan Fineberg notes the community’s early embrace of the internet and other technologies, a sensibility that seemed to grow naturally out of an abandoned industrial neighborhood. Fineberg discusses the “disconcerting expressionism of the set of human harnesses in Mary Traynor's Horror of Human Need [which] rely on a body empathy.” The historian also makes a note of Kit Blake’s concern with corporate welfare and contrasts it with the more local social innovations of Williamsburg that were emerging out of the new media technologies of the 1990s:

“Two forces, he says, are transforming alternative arts communities... ‘One, real estate development, is a local economic factor.’ The other, ‘is a world wide phenomenon of technological innovation engendering social change.’ Blake makes sculpture out of parts from heaters and copiers and experiments with lasers and lenses and the glitches that print out of fax machines.”

In the 2000 edition, Fineberg discusses the work of Blake’s occasional collaborator, Ebon Fisher who lived half a block away on Grand Street. The historian moves from the invisible threads of community to the immateriality of the internet, leaving behind an impression that echoes Blake's and Traynor’s concerns about human need and social change:

“The artist Ebon Fisher inhabited the close-knit artists’ neighborhood that existed in Williamsburg, Brooklyn at the start of the nineties. His work involved the interface of media, technology, and industry with the human environment of a small community... ‘The web,’ he said, 'has created the new Vienna.’ ...Fisher also began making digital art that had no fixed materiality; instead it had the flavor of contemporary Cyberpunk fiction, as in William Gibson’s 1984 novel Neuromancer... Fisher wrote utopian “social programs” on the computer [and] through community-based cultural enterprises and consumer technology, he aspired to reclaim the production of culture from the mass marketers.”

The Immersionists’ reconnection with the world was not an academic exercise to replace postmodernism and critical theory with new urban policies. To use Fisher’s term, it was a "submodern" and visceral form of local enchantment.

=== Submodern immersion ===
According to the music historian, Cisco Bradley, one of the first references to an immersive aesthetic in the community's literature appeared in Fisher’s manifesto, You Sub Mod, which is signed by the artist's production nom de plume, Nerve Circle. In The Williamsburg Avant-Garde, Bradley notes that the 1988 manifesto celebrated a “submodern” orientation hovering below established belief systems. Where Guy de Bord's Society of the Spectacle and Warhol's postmodern culture of surfaces seemed to lead to a state of paralysis, You Sub Mod suggests "integrating into the endless unfolding of spectacles" and burrowing, in effect, into whatever undefinable reality one might encounter:

"You are the SUB MODERN. You live in a million tribes and burrows, beneath the illusion we call the real world. While the Party passes over your heads you see its abject nakedness. You never believed in modernism and you aren't fooled by its vain reflection, postmodernism... Without proclamation you have integrated yourself into the endless unfolding of spectacles. You found that to immerse yourself was the thing, sensing that objectivity was only another dream."

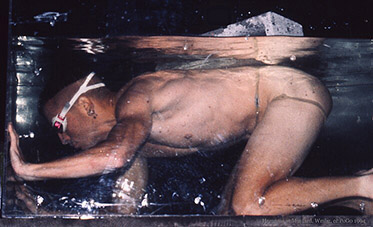
Immersion as public ritual. Andrew Hampsas immersed in a tank of water at the event space, Mustard, Williamsburg, 1994.

Bradley follows that with another quote from Fisher on the contrast between postmodern fragmentation and the Immersionist pursuit of living interconnection: "Postmodern deconstruction was over. Immersionism was about biological congealing and the vitality born from such convergence." Cultivating communal "media organisms" was another way the artist and writer described the process, a term picked up by Frank Popper in the art history book, Contemporary Artists, and by Jennifer Dalton for The Performing Arts Journal.

In the early 1990s, large social confluences referencing biological forms in their names became almost annual focal points for such congealing: The Sex Salon, Cats Head I and II, Flytrap, Human Fest and Organism. As the choreographer, Melanie Hahn Roche writes in The Drama Review about the Cat’s Head events, “The purpose of these shows goes beyond simply throwing a good party. Rather, this activity is necessary for the well-being of the community.”> A few years later along a similar vein, the Lalalandia collective promoted its night space, El Sensorium as a "techno-organic center for cultural development".

Although artifacts of art, music, literature and even diagrams of immersive systems emerged within Williamsburg's Immersionist community, the artists turned the entire industrial area by the waterfront, and the subjective human realms within it, into their medium. Where some focused on immersive installations and clubs, others on collaborative warehouse events, and others immersed themselves in the streets, local media networks and educational efforts, what they shared in common was intimate local engagement. This was not simply an art of multimedia light shows, but a culture of deep, personal and ecological immersion. Every club, event, publisher and theater troupe was enthralled by life in the neighborhood and explored several realms of immersion at once.

As early as 1991, The New York Press established that an adventurous ethic of interaction with the neighborhood was in play, a process the author, Mark Rose called “esthetic activism.” Anna Hurwitz, who had studied human ecology at the College of the Atlantic, is cited by Rose on her preference for a culture of participation. "I hate precious art," she declared. "I measure the success of my installations by the degree to which people participate." Rose discusses Hurwitz's displacement of furniture into a "Weird Thing Zone" on Grand Street that was set up by the immersive theater company, Nerve Circle. Using tape and traffic cones to set aside a space for interactive installations, the goal was to build relationships between studio artists, their neighbors and their shared environment. The term “weird thing zone” was used as a substitute for “art” and “gallery” to keep the focus on living systems and the mystery of creative interaction within an undefined public realm. As with many of the projects and events the Immersionists initiated, a dynamic was in play to move beyond the lofty realms of modernism, and the equally ethereal, but often alienating postmodernism, and return to a natural and even affectionate relationship with the immediate world (submodernism). As Hurwitz intimated, the interaction was the goal. Rose quotes the local activist, Chris Lanier on how the Weird Thing Zone connected with people at the Grand Street Waterfront Festival where it was immersed:

"'Oh, the kids loved it. They crawled all over everything,' says Chris Lanier of El Centro Cultural de Williamsburg, sponsors of the Grand Street Waterfront Festival. "That was a unique festival... Something happened at that festival. A coalition was formed."

Submodern immersion and participation were neighborly endeavors that in many ways bypassed one of the deepest mechanisms of the modern/postmodern world: commercialism. In "Brooklyn Unbound" Rose quotes another contributor to the Weird Thing Zone, Worm Magazine's publisher Kit Blake, on the emergence of a hands-on culture along the waterfront: "Everybody chips in and does what they can. Money as compensation is never part of the discussion."

=== Artistic metaphors of found objects ===
In contrast to the online social networks that began to emerge in the 1980s such as The Well, EchoNYC and The Thing, the creative community in Williamsburg explored physical local networks that were rooted in a complex and often dangerous urban ecosystem. Importantly, this physical and deeply collaborative immersion was sustained 24 hours per day and seven days a week for a decade. Although some of Williamsburg's groups augmented their efforts with immersive and interactive media, they rooted the work in the body and where the artists' lived, establishing more intense and resonant ecologies of meaning. Underscoring how creative immersion in a shared environment had inspired these aesthetic activists, Mark Rose stated in The New York Press in 1991: “The Williamsburg Way is to create art through activism and interconnection.”

For the Immersionists, to create was not an endeavor of a solitary artist, but a vital convergence of artists, media, community and habitat. In 1990, a description in the Village Voice by Sarah Ferguson captures such a confluence at Cat's Head II, a large interdisciplinary convergence in a warehouse by the waterfront:

"Three hours past showtime, with the men in blue still searching out fire hazards, a crowd of 300 was outside, getting restless. Suddenly Ethan Petit (a/k/a Medea de Vyse) stepped into the entranceway and began playing a kind of guitar-rigged light board, casting wild spectrums of color over the rubble-strewn lot. Meanwhile, the walls inside were trembling with the sound of an impromptu scrap concert, as folks began heaving rusted car parts into a pile of steel drums. 'We're squatting this place and they can't stop it!' shouted one guy, cracking a tail pipe over a girder, as a group of startled firemen scurried away. By midnight the authorities backed off, and the whole space was throbbing with people banging metal dangling from a huge web of ropes, putting neon golf balls up Jesse Helms's ass, and dancing to Chemical Wedding, Lauren Stauber, Laughing Sky, Rats of Unusual Size, and Colored Greens."

The "scrap concert" Ferguson refers to was Michael Zwicky's "Scrap Metal Music," a fusion of recycling, sculpture, music, communal experience and environmental context. The artist scavenged metal debris from the abandoned factories which became both percussive instruments and drumsticks. Guests were invited to begin drumming at the start of the evening and a rhythmic atmosphere unfolded for nine hours, mingling with the other performances and installations in the warehouse. The next morning the scrap metal was strewn about the warehouse floor, reentering the flow of waterfront debris. To separate the art from its context would drain the vitality and significance out of both. The interconnection, and the experience of interconnection, was the point.

Zwicky's blurring of boundaries between artists, raw materials, music, audiences and their environment brought to life what Fisher described as an extended "subjective ecosystem" in an essay for the British journal, Digital Creativity in 1998. Williamsburg's subjective ecosystem was essentially what psychologists would begin to embrace later as a form of extended mind, an embodied, networked, and exploratory thought process which lasted years and penetrated deep into Brooklyn. Williamsburg's extended mind was vividly illustrated in a poster Stavit Allweis made for the Flytrap warehouse event which featured writhing, biomorphic forms connecting a host of interdisciplinary offerings, including one that was even called "Endless Tissue."

Even while augmented by technology, the Immersionists' persistent relationship with their shared ecosystem offered what former EchoNYC member, Malcolm Gladwell, would define as "strong-tie connections that help us persevere in the face of danger". In contrast to the "weak-tie connections" of the internet, those strong ties have resulted in an institutional memory that has lasted decades after Williamsburg's village life gave way to corporate welfare in the new millennium.

Given the unstable nature of a district that had been outsourcing jobs overseas when the Immersionists arrived, suffering from a violent drug trade, and coping with toxic industrial waste, local creativity was not a spectacle providing an object of reflection from a removed perspective. The DIY acts of creation were bound up with survival. A regular writer for Waterfront Week and later Breukelen, Laurel Casey often described her sense of immersion in Williamsburg's toxic environment. She extolled the virtues of plunging through "city mishmash" and entering "the bottomless potholes on Kent Avenue." This intense sense of connection to her urban wilderness were spiritual notions for Casey. "Somehow I'll get down there," she wrote.

=== Immersive group events ===
Immersionism, in effect, was not an abstract discourse, but a process of deep connection to a local world. It was an embodied web of activity. Williamsburg's decaying factories and warehouses, along with the surrounding residential areas, became both elements of the work and contributors with agency. To witness the Pedestrian Project, for example, moving silently across the Brooklyn Bridge and through the streets of Williamsburg was not to simply delight in walking sculptures that emulated figures on street signs, but to become aware of the surrounding sounds, imagery and dynamics of the city. The audience was not framed as passive voyeurs, but participants in an unusual situation. Dancing in the streets with the Hungry March Band, or interacting with the Bindlestiff Family Circus or Circus Amok drew audiences into a highly personal and unpretentious sense of communal being. The same pertained to Lalalandia's fusion of music, food and bodies at Comfort Zones; or the throbbing convergences of phenomena in the all night warehouse events on Williamsburg’s waterfront. Immersive performances at Mustard such as Water and IFAM’s Bosch Food Chain, alluded to ecological systems while immersing audiences in a writhing, atmospheric garden of humans, plants and machines. Worm and Waterfront Week were as much windows into Williamsburg's creativity as they were deliberate exercises in the formation of community networks, and an attempt to connect the neighborhood discourse to larger planetary concerns. El Puente's Toxic Avengers were not just an after school program that kept youth out of trouble. The troupe staged creative environmental actions throughout Brooklyn that not only helped to raise awareness of environmental issues, but also cultivated community. The whole artistic, social and environmental system was greater than the sum of its parts.

The Flytrap, an interdisciplinary event spread across two warehouses, was quite explicit in its convergence of bodies and environment. It included a stage created by Cat's Head alums, Myk Henry and Anna Hurwitz, in which performers were enveloped by a huge Venus Flytrap, complete with fog that was pumped through its tubular needles. One performance at the Flytrap, "Medea's First Period" involved immersing Waterfront Week's columnist, Medea de Vyse into a large, oozing installation by Lauren Szold. Szold and Medea were accompanied by Stavit Allweis and Melanie Hahn as medical assistants. The biological referencing was extensive, from Medea's name evoking an Ancient Greek force of nature, to the liquid organic environment and lugubrious movements.

The ethos of biomorphic interconnection also appeared in "360-degree visual jam sessions" at popular clubs like Keep Refrigerated, El Sensorium, Fake Shop and a complex media and performance event by OVNI called 360° which was conducted at the Grand Street Ballroom. The catalog for the last large warehouse event of the decade, Organism, states that it was deliberately grown "out of the creative loam of Williamsburg, Brooklyn." 120 members of the creative community spread overlapping cultural and electronic webs across the site and the event was attended by over 2,000 guests who completed the massive creature. As stated in the program notes, organic interconnection was a fundamental mission of the event: "The Organism is an attempt to push the idea of linkage, collaboration and interaction to its mellifluous, weblike extreme."

Suzanne Wines discussed this lifelike quality in Domus:

"Conceived by Ebon Fisher, Organism became a kind of symbolic climax to the renegade activity that had been stirring within the community since the late eighties. It exploited the notion of architecture as living event, breathing and transforming for fifteen hours in an abandoned mustard factory. Unlike a traditional gallery exhibit where each object only engages the cube of space that it occupies, the collaborators in a 'web jam' create work that engages the entire space, the body and mind of the audience and through this process ultimately integrates with the community at large. A layering of system upon system..."

Demonstrative of the web of connections being explored at Organism was a large, crawl-in womb created by the rock band Thrust and the sculptor James Porter. The group staged a theatrical "orgasm" at midnight. Hit and Run Theater's stand-out contribution to the event involved three performers rappelling down grain silos on the site and criss-crossing through the factory yard among the revellers. One of the performers eventually immersed himself in a translucent cistern of water with scuba gear and read the New York Times.

Demonstrating that historical information could be treated as a subjective phenomenon with ecological properties, the documentarist Pegi Vail used spot lighting on artifacts found on the event's factory site to draw attention to industrial labor practices going back decades. Accompanied by the works of dozens of other artists and performers, and an audience that danced among the artifacts, the neighborhood's industrial past was brought back to life. In a similar fusion of modalities at Organism, Genia Gould turned the circulation of a medical emergency kit into a nightlong nursing performance.

Suzanne Wines investigated other weblike, organic forms of architecture in Williamsburg, including body-machine complexes at Fake Shop, Nerve Circle's AlulA Dimension, and Ovni and Lalalandia's richly woven environments of recycled materials and media. As a devotee of holistic architectural practice in her own work, Wines spoke sympathetically of the Immersionists' fixation on hybrid systems that folded together subjective and objective realities:

"The experience of a space is more important than the material which creates it. This kind of organic flexibility and environmental efficiency is a refreshing perspective with which to approach architecture and urban design, particularly now, when the creative energy of the digital revolution is still relatively untainted by social and political restrictions. It is a perfect time to revitalize an architectural practice that has become so culturally alienated from its context... The [immersive environments] described above propose spatial systems which evolve with and establish new relationships between the rich complexity of existing cultural and environmental forces. Nowhere in the world is the concentration of these forces as intense."

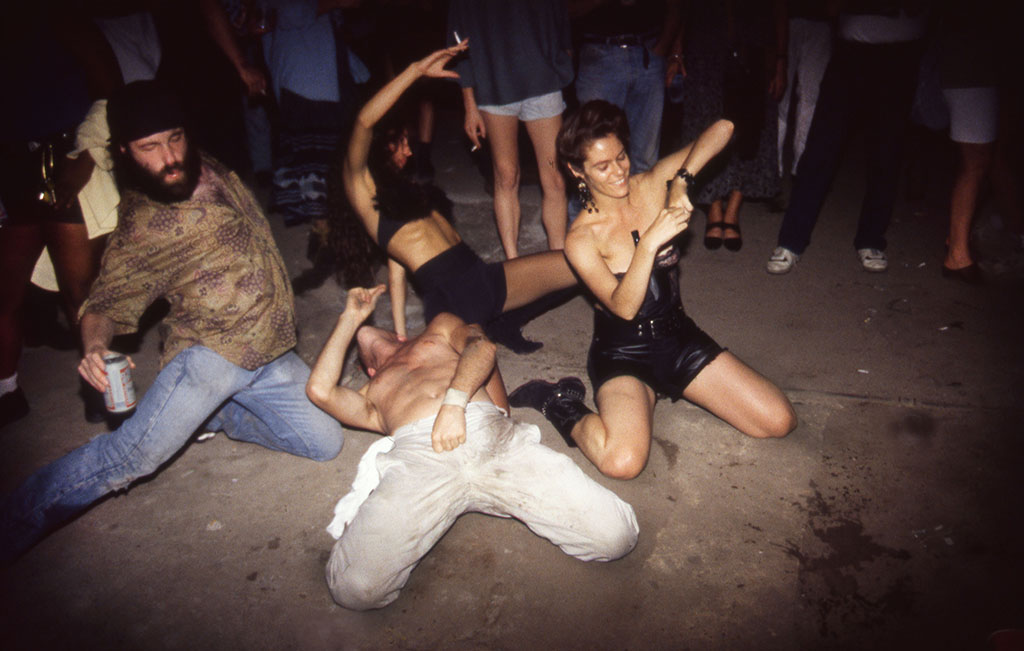
Dancing to Lex Grey at the warehouse event, Organism, June 12, 1993. Like many of Organism’s creators, Amy Shapiro (AKA Artemis, right) joined over 2,000 guests in dancing and exploring the event's cultural webs.

Deep immersion in a district the city of New York had largely abandoned was not for the light-hearted. An aesthetic attuned to an environment marked by factory waste, lost jobs and a dangerous drug trade could sometimes be more "illbient" than ambient, as Gregor Asch (DJ Olive) of Lalalandia often put it. Nevertheless, the night space in which illbient music emerged, Lalalandia's El Sensorium, took a regenerative approach to Williamsburg's industrial detritus by recycling it into rich, "omnisensorial" interior spaces embellished by music, water and live performances. One of the cultural systems at Organism involved a machine created by Sasha Noë and Bradford Reed that turned the recycling of beer bottles into what historian Cisco Bradley called a "sonic environment". The rhythmic smashing of bottles could be heard throughout the Old Dutch Mustard Factory, giving voice to a painful truth about consumer waste. Williamsburg writers like Laurel Casey shared her own complex balance between the ill and the inspired. In 1991 Casey writes in the New York Press:

"Having landed in the sacred dump of Williamsburg from Nowheresville, Vermont, I was experiencing such a peculiar bliss in the midst of toxic fumes and crack whore street dancing, that I craved to share the thrill and horror of it."

In its Web Jam Manifesto of 1993, Nerve Circle celebrated the convulsive, ecstatic nature of the neighborhood's creativity as "one really strange continuum":

"We are a storm of undefinable presences, suckling up to one another, congealing, integrating, staring into a mutual murk. We cyclically strain against, and surrender to, some wild howling node that lures the cosmic waters into its pretty little vortex. And the question emerges from this timeless cocoon: how do we extract pleasure from such an equation? Can human beings integrate with rusting steel, plants, socio-economic forces, local and international media, the very biosphere in which we breath, and still delight in the mix? Can we dance with such a monstrous Organism?"

Several musicians did attempt to dance within Williamsburg's Organism as wandering performers, including members of the band Thrust in blue body makeup, the singer and guitarist Tim Robert from Dream Prescription, Karen Cormier from the band Fric n Frac dressed as a wolf, and the "roving rapper" Doc Israel who improvised lyrics in response to the writhing event. With dozens of cultural and technological systems overlapping in an unpredictable mesh, the web jam expressed the convulsive nature of animals and plants adapting to a distressed environment. Writing about the web jam for the event's catalogue, the artist David Brody spoke of a broiling world that was "unique, on the edge of containment, and yet full of good spirit, rare spirit... a cigarette was lit and for me it's still smoking." Brody worked with Carlton Bright, Bozidar Kemperle and his brother Daniel Brody to install a web of video cameras and monitors at Organism, providing a kind of raw electronic circulation. This was echoed by WFMU's live audio broadcast via a phone line. This was emphatically not network television, but reflected the vinelike, trial-and-error strategies of neighborhood auto mechanics. David Brody's own animation research involving fractal growth patterns has reflected these sensibilities.

Unlike the disembodied immersions of computer games, or the removed skepticism that had become routine in Manhattan at the time, the Brooklyn Immersionists explored deep, urban, corporeal processes that impacted both themselves and the distressed world they lived in. Where Andy Warhol had produced grids of public figures like Marilyn Monroe and Mao Zedong to drain the images of meaning, Williamsburg's creative community often did the opposite: it invested everything around them with meaning. Whatever umbrella term they may have used to describe the aesthetic, and numerous terms were in play, many in Williamsburg's creative community withdrew from flat, pictorial space to bring meaning back into 360 degrees of local reality. This strategy was explicitly celebrated in the name of the immersive event "360°" which the group, Ovni produced in the Brooklyn Ballroom on Grand Street. Ovni is a Spanish acronym for UFO and underscores the uncanny nature of participatory creations that arise in one's own neighborhood.

Immersionism rejected both modernist objectivity and postmodern distrust in all systems of belief. It gave birth to an immersion in what might be likened to a natural, adaptive, feedback-driven collective being. This was both a vital and turbulent presence emerging in the neighborhood's "neuroelectronic brew" as The Outpost video collective put it in an essay for Jonathan Fineberg's exhibit, Out of Town: The Williamsburg Paradigm. Whether their creations involved warehouse events named after plants and animals, performers interacting with the neighborhood, illbient music that reflects the district's toxic industries, or manifestoes invoking submodern burrows and vinelike systems, Williamsburg's artists abandoned the entire discourse pitting impressions against objective truths, and operated in a visceral ecosystem of neighborhood resonances.

== Conceptual origins and history ==
=== Neighborhood discourse ===
Although an umbrella term for Williamsburg's Immersionist movement emerged over time, a common thread was a treatment of the arts as a living continuum, a "more dynamically interacting whole" as art historian Jonathan Fineberg described the aesthetic. Ebon Fisher's Nerve Circle manifesto from 1988, You Sub Mod, included the line "To immerse yourself was the thing, sensing that objectivity was only another dream."

In 1992, Laurel Casey uses the term immersion in Waterfront Week to describe Williamsburg:

"Williamsburg is a glob of individuals within globs of religious and racial groups with a vast array of orientations that are interwoven into class structures with globs of desires primarily remaining unfulfilled... [So] I went back into therapy and was encouraged to confront the problem head-on. I would participate in a psychological and sociological immersion..."

Other groups in the Immersionist community included themes of biology and ecosystems in the titles of their work and in their group names, including Minor Injury, Worm, Nerve Circle, El Sensorium and the Green Room, Waterfront Week, Oasis, The Bog, Weird Thing Zone, Lalalandia, Ongolia, 360°, Arcadia, The Outpost, Los Sures (El Pitirre), Galapagos, and Pluto Cat on the Earth.

Performance groups like the Pedestrian Project, Hit and Run Theater, the Hungry March Band and Alien Action have spoken of their own environmental philosophies. In an essay she wrote for Fineberg's exhibit at the Krannert Art Museum, Yvette Helin defined her Pedestrian Project in Williamsburg as "improvisational interaction with the given environment". She also spoke of reaching out to both physical and mental public spaces in an effort to "pull people into a collective consciousness" and to encourage them to "reconstruct the place we are in".

Helin said that involving the public was intended to be transformative:

"Onlookers can interject their own experiences in the performances, making the project accessible and transcending the hierarchies of education and class."

Individual acts such as Artemis, Medea de Vyse, Miss Kitty and Gene Pool participated in events, such as local community meetings and protest marches. To help attract the wider community to protests against the city's incinerator proposal, Pool often wore a suit of recycled cans while riding a unicycle. In 1993 the transmedia artist spoke of "working across ego boundaries" at the all night community event Organism. In 1996 Pool convinced the Crest Hardware store in Williamsburg to allow dozens of artists to immerse their works among the merchandise and to offer it for sale. The project was repeated every other year for a decade.

While a variety of synonyms for the social-ecological aesthetic were used in the 1990s, including “to immerse” in 1988 and “immersion” in 1992, the umbrella term "Immersionism" started to be used in 2011. By that time, city-sponsored corporate development and the higher costs of living in Williamsburg that followed, had driven out many members of the Williamsburg avant-garde. The community that once lived near the Williamsburg Bridge had to reconvene in an online discussion on social media. Initiated by Dennis Del Zotto in a Facebook group, the discussion included members of some of the most active Immersionist collectives of the 1990s: Waterfront Week, Worm Magazine, Minor Injury, Epoché, Nerve Circle, The Lizard's Tail, The Green Room, Lalalandia, Ongolia, Fake Shop, Floating Point Unit and Ovni.

=== History ===
In many ways, Immersionism was an outgrowth of the post-industrial era. After losing hundreds of industrial jobs to outsourcing overseas in the latter half of the 20th century and disinvestment by the City of New York, Williamsburg went into severe economic decline. Its revitalization began with the formation of activist groups like Los Sures and The People's Firehouse in the 1970s, and the establishment of the creative educational program, El Puente in 1982. In the late 1980s, open mic nights at the Bog and the Lizard’s Tail Cabaret, and events at Ladislav Czernek's repurposed warehouse space, Epoché began to seed a creative network. There were early signs of an Immersionist aesthetic at Epoché in June 1989 where the biologically informed exhibit, Emergent Forms took place featuring references to neuronets in an “interactive environment” by Kit Blake. That same year, Nerve Circle staged a performance at Epoché with Ebon Fisher on mic, Scott Grande on drums and Theresa Podlesney aggressively scanning the audience with a video camera and projecting it live on a screen. Blake and Nerve Circle's creations suggest that technological developments like artificial intelligence and surveillance systems were as critical to the formation of an Immersionist discourse as the communal formations at the clubs and cabarets.

Another early arts establishment in North Brooklyn, Minor Injury, initially opened in Greenpoint, but when its founder, Mo Bahc retired, the new director, Kevin Pyle, moved the politically engaged gallery to Grand Street in 1990 to be closer to the emerging Immersionist scene near the waterfront.

The first major event to gather an interdisciplinary mix of artists, The Sex Salon, opened on Valentine's Day, 1990, at Epoché. An early cross-section of Immersionists formulated the event and included members of Minor Injury, the Lizard's Tail, Nerve Circle, Waterfront Week, Word of Mouth, and the band, Versus. The three-day festival involved a wide range of disciplines and celebrated a fluid vision of sexuality. The playful title was an early indication of the Immersionists' interest in visceral connection with the public. Nearly a hundred artists signed up to explore a fusion of "performance, live music, jam, dancing", and featured gender-bending performances, erotic images, anatomical diagrams of sexual intercourse, and films depicting a range of romantic orientations. Writing in the local monthly, Word of Mouth, media theorist Sam Binkley spoke of the event's intensity and its role in catalyzing a community:

"[The Sex Salon] brought together more people with more energy and more focus than any other event held here in the past five years... people seemed to be actually inventing a new sense of community as they experienced it."

Five months after the Sex Salon, the Lizard's Tail Cabaret launched the Cat's Head, a "multidimensional convergence" that occupied a warehouse at the Old Dutch Mustard Factory on N. 1st Street. Led by Terry Dineen, Jean Francois Poitier and Rube Fenwick, 50 volunteers encircled the guests with live music and installations, inspiring dancing that lasted the entire night. As Mike Cohen described the interdisciplinary event for Word of Mouth, the art and music was "easily flowing into the whole". He observed the same sense of intimacy that had emerged at the Sex Salon: "There's a closeness, a touching, a communion of sorts." Street, warehouse, and rooftop events began to spread to the rest of Williamsburg, and a network of local media emerged. These included Hit and Run Theater's street productions, the Pedestrian Project which grew out of the Green Room, and Nerve Circle's interactive media experiments like the Weird Thing Zone on Grand Street and collective "Media Compressions" at Minor Injury Gallery. A second, larger Cat's Head appeared in an abandoned warehouse by the waterfront which immersed audiences in a night of dancing, art and music near the waterfront. In the Village Voice, Helena Mulkerns described how the event easily became an extension of its postindustrial environment:

"With a stoic nod of its feline nose, [Cat's Head II] simply prowled outside in the gracious form of the dance troupe, Marisa's Peaches, which promptly began its proceedings on a windswept wasteland stage whose drop was the Manhattan skyline, whose illumination was a single spotlight, whose audience sat down in the weeds and bought beers which had been brought out from the bar. In the dimming twilight, alongside an abandoned car, swathed in gauze like a mummified auto-sarchophagus, the dancers began the party."

By 1993, the Immersionist community had helped to launch five large interdisciplinary gatherings in Williamsburg’s abandoned warehouses, growing larger and more layered with each iteration: The Sex Salon, Cats Head I and II, Flytrap and Organism. Another influential warehouse experiment to emerge in the early 1990s was the night club, Keep Refrigerated which helped to establish several other groups and venues: the night club, Room Temperature; a project group, Lalalandia; and the second hand music shop, Earwax. Room Temperature gave birth to Floating Point Unit and FakeShop, and Lalalandia, in turn, created a series of social-environmental experiments: Game Room, Translounge, Comfort Zones and the experimental nightclub, El Sensorium.

The enterprises emerging in Williamsburg in the early 1990s were not casual experiments. In Domus Magazine, Suzanne Wines dedicated a long article to a cluster of Immersionists who were devoted to exploring bio-technological themes in their work. She was drawn to the rich interplay of bodies and technology at Fake Shop and Ovni, and likened elements of Lalalandia's subterranean, "techno-organic" night space, El Sensorium to the Alhambra in Spain:

"The bar of El Sensorium merged the ritual of drinking with the existing dampness of the basement space into a complete aquatic experience. The bartender served drinks through a curtain of raining water which followed the contours of the bar. Other spaces appeared to merge with furniture, food and guests into a homogeneous unstable fluid via light and video projections through walls of flowing liquid. The dimension of a room made of tangled golden wire found on site dissolved into a texture of indeterminate depth like the tiled patterns that adorn the Alhambra."

Wines also explored the weblike nature of two projects initiated by Nerve Circle: the large, all night community event, Organism and a climbable structure built into Nerve Circle studio as an infrastructure for experimental media events:

"As a 'living media organism' the AlulA Dimension has a completely symbiotic relationship with its environment and inhabitants. Inspired by similarities between the flexible structures of ecological systems and the internet, Ebon Fisher began breeding the AlulA Dimension as an "organic matrix" for social interaction."

Drawing the new media technologies of the early 1990s into Williamsburg's creative ecosystem, all of these Immersionist media groups explored different strategies for bending the technology away from its intended purpose as a profit maximizing tool, into more organic and communal purposes. Jeff Gompertz, who organized complex media-augmented events with Fake Shop and Floating Point Unit in Williamsburg, and Fisher, who had taught at MIT's Media Lab at its inception in 1985, were invited to join other prominent New York artists at the Brooklyn Academy of Music in 1999 for a conference on experimental fusions of art and technology. Other invited artists included the musician and bicycle advocate David Byrne, the performance artist Bill Irwin, and the experimental architects Elizabeth Diller and Ricardo Scofidio. Echoing Robert Rauschenberg's Experiments in Art and Technology (EAT) of the 1960s, the artists were teamed up with research scientists from Lucent Technology (formerly Bell Labs). In a similar role as cultural exporter, Caterina Verde, an artist who worked closely with The Outpost in Williamsburg, was invited to join The Kitchen in Manhattan as the Performance Art Curator where she initiated a series of evenings that explored immersive, techno-cultural fusions. Her series, Hybrid Nights (1994–1999), became one of the most popular events of that experimental arts center. The announcement for the very first event touches on many Immersionist themes: "Body & language, sound & form, earth & air, interruptions & concentration." By the end of the 1990s, the Immersionists had brought a new creative vitality to the rest of the city and moved the epicenter of New York's cultural innovation to Brooklyn. In 1996, Neill Strauss of The New York Times referred to Williamsburg's creative community as "pioneers" of an ambient culture that had begun to spread around the globe. He notes that "The visual and tactile aspects of today's ambient clubs" came from "a series of parties that took place in the early 1990's in Williamsburg, Brooklyn." Referring to the last of those events, Organism the German newspaper Die Zeit declared that "Events like these finally established Williamsburg as an artists' colony." An article by Melissa Rossi in Newsweek, "The Gathering of the Art Tribes" zeroed in on Myk Henry's exploding watermelons at Organism and touched on a performance by Hit and Run Theater on three of the silos at the Old Dutch Mustard Factory where the layered event unfolded:

"Call it the sequel to the rave... For 12 hours, more than 2,000 people pushed into an abandoned mustard factory to see the work of 120 artists, featuring everything from exploding watermelons to performers rappelling down silos... 'The fine arts are dead,' one of the organizers explains, 'and we're taking advantage of decentralized media to create a new cultural forum.' – Melissa Rossi, Newsweek, 1993

With semi-annual projects like Gene Pool’s Crest Hardware Show penetrating deep into a local Williamsburg hardware store, and the opening of the interdisciplinary club, Galapagos with its innovative burlesque shows and resident film collective, Ocularis, the struggling district enjoyed a renaissance. Williamsburg had evolved from an industrial area that was losing jobs overseas and enduring an explosion of violent crime, to a vibrant, post-industrial economy of small, creative businesses and non-profit cultural enterprises. Older establishments that managed to survive the economic recession of the 1970s and 1980s, such as Teddy's Bar and Grill and Kashia's Restaurant, were able to thrive again. The 1990s in Williamsburg, dubbed the “Golden Era" in Ward Shelley’s print, The Williamsburg Timeline, was eventually overwhelmed by a very different kind of gold. As stated in the introduction, a partnership between real estate financiers and the City of New York, neither of which could claim actual immersion in the creative district, resulted in rezoning and tax abatement measures that strictly favored corporations. A steep rise in the cost of living followed this classic form of corporate welfare, undermining Williamsburg's revitalized village culture and the ability of many of its artists and musicians to remain in the neighborhood. The creative community was largely made up of renters and had nothing to protect them from the takeover. A less intimate, mass produced corporate culture moved in, replacing the eco-cultural movement that made it possible.

== Public reception ==
=== Mainstream recognition ===
Williamsburg's creative scene was reported in media including New York Press, Wired, Die Zeit, PAJ: A Journal of Performance and Art, The New Yorker, The Guggenheim Museum's magazine, Flash Art, The Village Voice, Newsweek, Fuji Television, and others.

Some of the earliest media coverage of north Brooklyn's creative community appeared in the 1980s in reference to the educational center, El Puente near the eastern entrance to the Williamsburg Bridge. A few years later coverage of the non-profit gallery, Minor Injury in Greenpoint began to appear. It wasn't until an article by Mark Rose in The New York Press in 1991, "Brooklyn Unbound," that the mainstream press began to discover a large creative community emerging in a third zone along the waterfront near the bridge. A year after Rose's article came out, New York Magazine covered Williamsburg's creative upwelling in a cover story, "The New Bohemia."

Other articles in the Village Voice and the Drama Review appeared on the Cats Head warehouse gatherings. In 1993, the European art journal, Flash Art noted that the neighborhood's immersive "tradition" had made its way to Williamsburg's first large commercial gallery, Test-Site. Initiated by one of its artists, Ebon Fisher, the gallery’s Salon of the Mating Spiders attracted the works of six hundred artists who lined up around the block to install work of every kind in every conceivable space. As listed in Worm Magazine, the salon was “totally open, noncurated, no size limitation, any medium." By eliminating restrictions on size and medium, the entire gallery was turned into an experiment in emergent, communal design. The gallery director, Annie Herron stated in Flash Art that “At first I thought it was crazy”, but then admitted the Salon of the Mating Spiders had become her best-selling show. The event was announced with a poster by Minor Injury's new director, Kevin Pyle, and included music performances on a scaffold by the Immersionist musicians Dina Emerson and Ken Butler. In another effort to honor the entire neighborhood, Ebon Fisher and Chris Lanier at El Centro Cultural de Williamsburg encouraged Test-Site's director, Annie Herron, to make her large space available for a fundraiser in support of Nydia Velázquez who went on to become the first Puerto Rican woman to serve in the United States Congress.

Test-Site exhibited works by several of the early Immersionists, including musical instruments by Ken Butler that involved the recycling of locally sourced materials, extensive spills of kitchen ingredients by Lauren Szold, and works by Rosa Volado who created mobile architecture for communal gatherings. Volado later went on to establish the Greenpoint Film Festival. Fisher’s solo show for Test-Site, "Heat-Seeking Psycho-Suctions" (1992) involved audience-triggered projections on the floor of the darkened gallery. The interactive exhibit trapped viewers in a variety of networks, providing an early commentary on the seductions and hazards of social media. The digital code behind these “media organisms” were sold along with their projection apparatus so the code behind the exhibit could be cultivated memetically. This was a unique approach to culture for the time and discussed in Wired Magazine, Digital Creativity, Fuji Television, Domus, and several art history books. Inspired by Williamsburg's emerging presence in the press, the art historian Jonathan Fineberg flew out from the University of Illinois to study the dynamic community. In 1993 he presented a large exhibition of works by 23 members of Williamsburg's "vibrant community of artists" at the university's Krannert Art Museum in Urbana-Champaign. More than half of the artists in the exhibit, "Out of Town: The Williamsburg Paradigm" were associated with the Immersionist movement near the waterfront. Within months of Fineberg's exhibition, WFMU was presenting a live audio broadcast of the community’s warehouse event, Organism, and Melissa Rossi was discussing Organism's cultural strategy, the "web jam" and Lalalandia's term, the "omnisensorial sweepout" in Newsweek.

In 1996, The New York Times referred to Williamsburg's artists and musicians as "pioneers" of a new ambient aesthetic. A year later, Fuji Television set up a satellite truck outside Robert Elmes' interdisciplinary arts center, Galapagos for a live broadcast of Immersionist creations to Tokyo. The host, Tetsuo Suda, interviewed the Immersionist artists Dennis del Zotto, Ebon Fisher, and Fred Valentine and presented some of the immersive work they had installed in the club.

By the end of the 1990s, Williamsburg's creative systems were being reported around the world. Robert Elmes was invited to curate Williamsburg works for MoMA PS1 in Queens in 2000, and in 2003, Galapagos became a setting for Jim Jarmusch's film, Coffee and Cigarettes. Jarmusch's scene featured a conversation between the actors Alfred Molina and Steve Coogan sitting next to the dark reflecting pool at Galapagos, a symbol of the club's devotion to ecological immersion.

Immersionist creations have also been presented by the Cooper Hewitt Museum, the Musée d'Art Contemporain de Montréal, the Guggenheim Museum and a travelling exhibition in Britain sponsored by the Royal Scottish Academy. In 1995, Jonathan Fineberg included Immersionist works with strong messages about interdependence in his book, Art Since 1940: Strategies of Being. These included a wall piece by Kit Blake that lights a copy of the New York Times’ Real Estate section on fire, Ebon Fisher's bionic code, Link with Distressed Humans, and an elastic and steel sculpture by Mary Traynor called Horror of Human Need. In his 1997 music anthology, State of the Union, the composer, Elliott Sharp included music by the Immersionists DJ Olive, Fisher, and Karthik Swaminathan (Kit Krash).

Following rent increases in Williamsberg, many of the Immersionists continued to employ immersive strategies in their work in other places and have discussed their formative years in such films as Marcin Ramocki's Brooklyn DIY (2009). As Jillian Steinhauer states in Hyperallergic in 2013: "It's indisputable that Immersionism had a big impact on the culture of Brooklyn as we know it today."

=== Brooklyn as a new avant-garde ===
Along with other neighborhood-centered arts movements, such as the Jazz and film scenes in neighboring Fort Greene, Immersionism helpied to move New York's cultural cutting edge eastward. In 2019, two decades after the creative transformation of Williamsburg, Joseph Giovanni acknowledged the shift in the Architectural Record:

"[Brooklyn has] taken the baton of avant-gardism from Manhattan and run with it at uncatchable speeds. Manhattan was stuck. Many arts lovers hankered to be on the far side of the East River, living in other zip codes."

Community organizations had been working to rejuvenate parts of Williamsburg since the 1970s, In the late 1970s, artists who could no longer afford work space in Manhattan began to move into Williamsburg's abandoned industrial buildings and under-utilized apartments. This first wave of artists and musicians, continued to make Manhattan the center of their professional lives. In the late 1980s a small creative community began to assemble in an area near the Williamsburg Bridge where economic activity was especially depressed. Removed from both the arts infrastructure of Manhattan and a subway to get them there, this new community of artists and musicians began to focus their creative activity where they lived.

Ladislav Czernek, the founder of the creative warehouse space Epoché, declares in Williamsburg's monthly zine, Word of Mouth in 1989:

"Epoché is a not-for-profit, autonomous, multi-disciplinary, artist-run exhibition space, the aim of which is to cultivate and engage an audience within our community. Epoché aspires to be as much a meeting house, a laboratory or a school, as much as it does to be an exhibition space... to feed, and feed off a neighborhood, not just occupy it."

Other creative clubs near the waterfront started to cultivate a local community. These included the Lizard's Tail, the Bog, The Green Room, Keep Refrigerated, and an informal dance space in a storefront called Rub a Dub. Nerve Circle cultivated community through living social media experiments in a variety of locations, including the streets, an abandoned factory, Minor Injury Gallery and its own loft above a furniture factory on Grand Street. The geographic separation of these groups and venues from established centers of the arts in Manhattan provided the psychic space to reflect on neighborhood life, and to transition away from the modern and postmodern systems of thought that characterized much of the 20th century. That earlier culture stressed art for the art market, a division of the arts into separate disciplines, and the paradigm of the solo artist separated from nature and society. In contrast, the Brooklyn artists near the Williamsburg Bridge immersed themselves in their local, interdisciplinary world and began to turn the streets, warehouses, rooftops and local community networks into an extended medium for creation. Large, immersive events in the streets and warehouses became focal points for the community. Even with their own system of media in place to generate interest in their works, the Immersionists did not simply set out to produce "multimedia" products intended to drive ticket sales or interest from music producers and art dealers. Worm, Waterfront Week, The Nose, The Curse and other zines were dedicated to building a local discourse on a range of concerns, from the philosophical to the political to the ecological. Artist and event organizer, Anna Hurwitz noted that the Lizard's Tail's activities – which extended from open mic nights at the cabaret to large warehouse events like the Cat's Heads – were largely focused on neighborhood transformation.

Speaking to a reporter at The Greenline along the same lines, one of Lalalandia's members, Gabrielle Latessa Ortiz stated that the group's restaurant, Comfortzones was also a vehicle for social transformation. The goal was to create an affordable restaurant for the neighborhood while simultaneously immersing the public in a "wondrous netherworld atmosphere". The video artist, Al Arthur described Williamsburg's neighborhood ethos no less poignantly in just three words: "It's a gift."

The scene attracted an influx of other artists and extensive national and international media attention. All of the large immersive events and clubs near Williamsburg's waterfront – The Sex Salon, Cats Head I, Cats Head II, Flytrap, El Sensorium and Organism – were presented as the highlights of Williamsburg's "Golden Age" according to a chart released in 2000 by the artist Ward Shelly. The elaborate serigraph, "The Williamsburg Timeline," was exhibited in the Brooklyn Art Museum, discussed in The New York Times and Flash Art, and is held in the collection of the Brooklyn Art Museum and The Museum of Modern Art. By the late 1990s, museums, music anthologies and history books around the world began to share artifacts of art and music from Williamsburg's Immersionist scene.

Williamsburg's rebirth after a long economic decline, however, was not only indicated in timelines and international exhibitions, but in the revival of the neighborhood itself. Misconceptions about gentrification to the contrary, a 2004 study actually showed a reduction of attrition rates among the disadvantaged in Williamsburg in the 1990s. According to the New York Department of Labor, it wasn't until after the City of New York rezoned Williamsburg in the new millennium, and began to subsidize corporate development, that attrition rates among underpaid populations increased again.

According to Brainard Carey, subsidizing corporate developers is a monopolistic practice that stifles competition, raises the cost of living, and reduces innovation.

== Immersionism in society ==
=== Influence on nightclub culture ===
In 1996, Neil Strauss said in the New York Times that Manhattan's ambient club scene at the time had drawn its inspiration from the "early 1990's in Williamsburg, Brooklyn." The beginning of the Immersionist movement in Williamsburg coincided with a revival of interest in ambient music in the United States, including in nightclubs.

According to writer and Immersionist choreographer Melanie Hahn Roche in the Drama Review, Williamsburg's immersive culture "goes beyond simply throwing a good party", since the process by which Williamsburg's events were organized emphasized "relationships above the need to come up with answers efficiently". Per Roche, this "activity is necessary for the well-being of the community".

=== Immersionism as a paradigm ===
Breaking free from a 20th century paradigm of the alienated artist, and embracing a vivid sense of shared environmental being, the Immersionists created a model that has spread through academic journals and mass media alike. Immersionist cultural innovations and theories had a chance to spread on their merits, but the neighborhood's narrative helped to carry the message: A dying industrial district was transformed into a vibrant urban destination and provided a model for a new interdisciplinary and ecological paradigm for the arts, journalism, psychology and urban renewal. Although the Immersionist revival of Williamsburg was exploited in the new millennium by city-corporate partnerships, Immersionism's philosophical influence on Brooklyn and the wider culture is extensive.

Groups like the Institute for Aesthetic Modulation (IFAM), with roots in both the East Village of Manhattan and Williamsburg, went on to bring their intense form of environmental theater to Brooklyn locations like the Coney Island Mermaid Parade where they won best performance several years running in the new millennium. Other community-based groups based in Williamsburg continued to operate well into the new millennium such as Circus Amok and the Bindlestiff Family Circus. Driven out of its building by developers in the 1990s, one of the original Immersionist organizations, The Outpost moved to Ridgewood in the new millennium. New groups have emerged in Bushwick and Fort Greene in Brooklyn, and in nearby Ridgewood, Queens. The ecologically engaged, experimental artists’ collective, Woodbine also emerged in Ridgewood soon after the Outpost’s relocation. According to The Guardian, among Woodbine’s goals is to “organize a farm share, offer yoga classes, screen films and host lectures on topics including universal healthcare and climate disinformation.” In 2013 BRIC Arts opened Media House, a multi-disciplinary arts center to the public.

==== Interdisciplinary and green culture ====
In many ways, the Immersionists anticipated a planetwide shift towards interdisciplinary culture, social practices in the arts, and the emerging fields of biological co-regulation, embodied cognition, and extended mind thesis. Three decades after The Sex Salon celebrated a communal, interdisciplinary mix of "love letters, performance, live music, jam, dancing" and inspired "multidimensional convergences", "omnisensorial" environments and an all night "web jam" near the Williamsburg waterfront, a professor at Yale University noticed a similar embrace of a wider, living context for his colleagues' work. Nicholas Wolterstorff states in a PBS interview in 2020:

"A number of [my colleagues] are beginning to come along with me and say: let's not just expand our understanding of concert hall music and museum visual art, but let's go beyond the museums and let's go beyond the concert halls..."

Even the world of commerce began to pick up on these ecological themes. In 2025 a coffee company associated with Aldi supermarkets has extolled the virtues of its fair trade practices and referenced the interconnections of nature in its marketing, stating on the back of its Sumatra ground coffee, “We live & breathe the whole experience.” Litigation has been attempted against some businesses, such as Coca-Cola, that have used the language of sustainability to market products that have not actually reduced the amount of plastic it introduces into the planet’s oceans and landfills, a marketing practice known as “greenwashing." Nevertheless, the Brooklyn Immersionists set the stage for a green culture and that has spread in both language and practice.

==== Embodiment in psychology ====
Psychologists have also begun to explore a broader, more ecological framework for studying the mind. The new fields of embodied and extended cognition stress that the cognitive, emotional and aesthetic properties of the mind cannot be fully understood by studying an individual's brain, but must be seen as a function of an organism's total interactions with the world. Quoted in a guest blog for Scientific American in 2011, over two decades after the Immersionists first began to cultivate a networked and immersive arts culture in Williamsburg, the psychologist Joshua Davis from Barnard College opined that embodied cognition was just beginning to gel as a new framework for cognitive psychology, stating: "I see embodiment as a new paradigm that we are shifting towards."

As late as 2018, a professor of neurology at the University College London, Karl Friston also noted the emergence of a new paradigm on the British Council's video series, Serious Science and echoes Immersionist philosophy:

"Everything is in the coupling of the body to the environment in which it is immersed... Is it all in the head? Or is it somehow a partnership with the world, a partnership with the physical situation that we find ourselves in, that we mediate and couple with through our body?"

Friston even equates embodied cognition with dancing, a fundamental communal element in many of the Immersionist creations. He indicates that at the time of his talk in 2018, cognitive psychologists were just beginning to recognize the significance of immersion:

"You really have to think about the action-perception cycle, the circulation causality induced by the notion that the environment is acting upon you, and you are acting upon the environment. And it's a dance, a dialogue. So that's certainly in the ascendancy in the past few years."

Both Davis and Friston were citing the emergence of a new environmental framework for the mind a quarter century after the Immersionist Anna Hurwitz was moving furniture around Williamsburg to increase "the degree to which people participate", Ebon Fisher was celebrating the "psycho-physical swirl", and organizing "web jams" and "squirmcasts", Kit Blake was promoting a "publishing network", and Lalalandia was recycling industrial detritus into an "omnisensorial sweepout". This was not just a change in perspective and approach, but a fully engaged ethic. Yvette Helin was immersing The Pedestrian Project in the streets to "pull people into a collective consciousness, [allowing us to] see who we are and how we relate to the people and spaces around us."

Jessica Nissen, a veteran of the Cat's Head, Flytrap and Organism gatherings, and a painter with a strong interest in biology and science fiction, presented a very concise foreshadowing of extended cognition as early as 1993. In the catalog for Jonathan Fineberg's exhibit, Out of Town: The Williamsburg Paradigm, she wrote: "internal/external, voluntary/involuntary, physical/psychological, experience/dream" and sums this up in two words that cover the gamut from the neighborly to the biological: "circuitous systems".

David Pescovitz, a frequent writer for Wired Magazine and a co-editor of BoingBoing.net, could have been referencing any of the Immersionists when he discusses Ebon Fisher's early paradigmatic shift in a catalog for the artist's 2006 museum retrospective, Transformations in the Nervepool:

"Long before Friendster, locative media, and emergent everything, Ebon Fisher saw the beauty in... cultural and social experimentation and connection. His art is a delightful reminder that communication is really about communality."

==== Theories of a living universe ====
In a larger sense, Immersionism moved beyond the postmodern vision of the world as a Warholian hall of mirrors with no meaning or agency, and rejected the world as an administrative machine, where urban renewal can only manifest through top down mechanisms. In a profound economic paradigm shift it began to explore a vision of bottom up, emergent culture driven by collective dreaming. With their biomorphic nomenclature, Submodern tribal ethics, and events with names like "Organism," "El Sensorium" and "Toxic Avengers," the Immersionists anticipated the shift to an ecological vision of reality in the new millennium. And they embraced such a paradigm at a time when digital technology was beginning to grab the headlines and corporate systems were in the ascendency. Since then, as both the corporate and digital worlds came under increasing scrutiny, many philosophers and physicists have begun to echo the Immersionist's organismic paradigm.

Over two decades after the Immersionists were coming together in multidimensional convergences and celebrating life in the form of an ecological web jam, Adrian David Nelson, in his book, Origins of Consciousness, suggests that the universe may be an "evolving, vital and creative" process, and may be thought of more as an organism than a machine. Like the Immersionists' references to "subjective ecology" and constructs that embrace hybrid forms of "internal/external" and "physical/psychological" presence, Nelson suggests that the physical world may even be "suffused with sentience". Such an "intrinsic consciousness movement" in cosmology points to a "reenchantment of the cosmos".

In the documentary, The Living Universe: Cosmos as Organism (2019), Nelson furthers this line of thought:

"We appear to see further and with greater understanding through an organismic lens than through any other concept available to us. Understanding the rise of the organismic paradigm requires that we understand some of the historical forces that have shaped the outlook of Western Science, as well as their resulting influence on the modern mind."

Brainard Carey said in 2016 that Immersionism had become both a model for creative urbanism and a philosophy of ecological being. Having witnessed the movement personally he stated on the air:

"There was a warmth to it that was stunning. It was even warmer than the scenes of the 1960s because there didn't seem to be these hierarchies. The appearance to the audiences was of an unusual generosity."

== See also ==
- Community art
- Performance art
- Participatory art
- Interactive art
- Installation art
- Intermedia
- BioArt
- Contextualism
- Ecological art
- Interdisciplinarity
- Urbanism
- Relational Aesthetics
- Social sculpture
- Structural functionalism
- Systems art
- Systems theory
- Artivism
