= Post-postmodernism =

Artistic and philosophical movement

Post-postmodernism is a wide-ranging set of developments in critical theory, philosophy, architecture, art, literature, and culture which are emerging from, and reacting to, postmodernism and its antecedent, modernism. While there are varied definitions of post-postmodernism, common themes include a focus on sincere reconnection with the world that modernism had positioned the observer above, or postmodernism had alienated them from. In contrast to the ironic and unstable belief systems endemic to postmodernism, common themes of post-postmodernism include sincerity, trust, faith, immersion and nurturing.

== Modernism and postmodernism ==
Around 1900 modernism became the dominant cultural force in the intellectual circles of Western culture well into the mid-twentieth century. Like all eras, modernism encompasses many competing individual directions and is impossible to define as a discrete unity or totality. However, its chief general characteristics are often thought to include an emphasis on "radical aesthetics, technical experimentation, spatial or rhythmic, rather than chronological form, [and] self-conscious reflexiveness" as well as the search for authenticity in human relations, abstraction in art, and utopian striving. These characteristics are normally lacking in postmodernism or are treated as objects of irony. Sincere connection with an audience, and in the case of the Brooklyn Immersionists, deep connection with the environment, are hallmarks of post-postmodern strategies of creation.

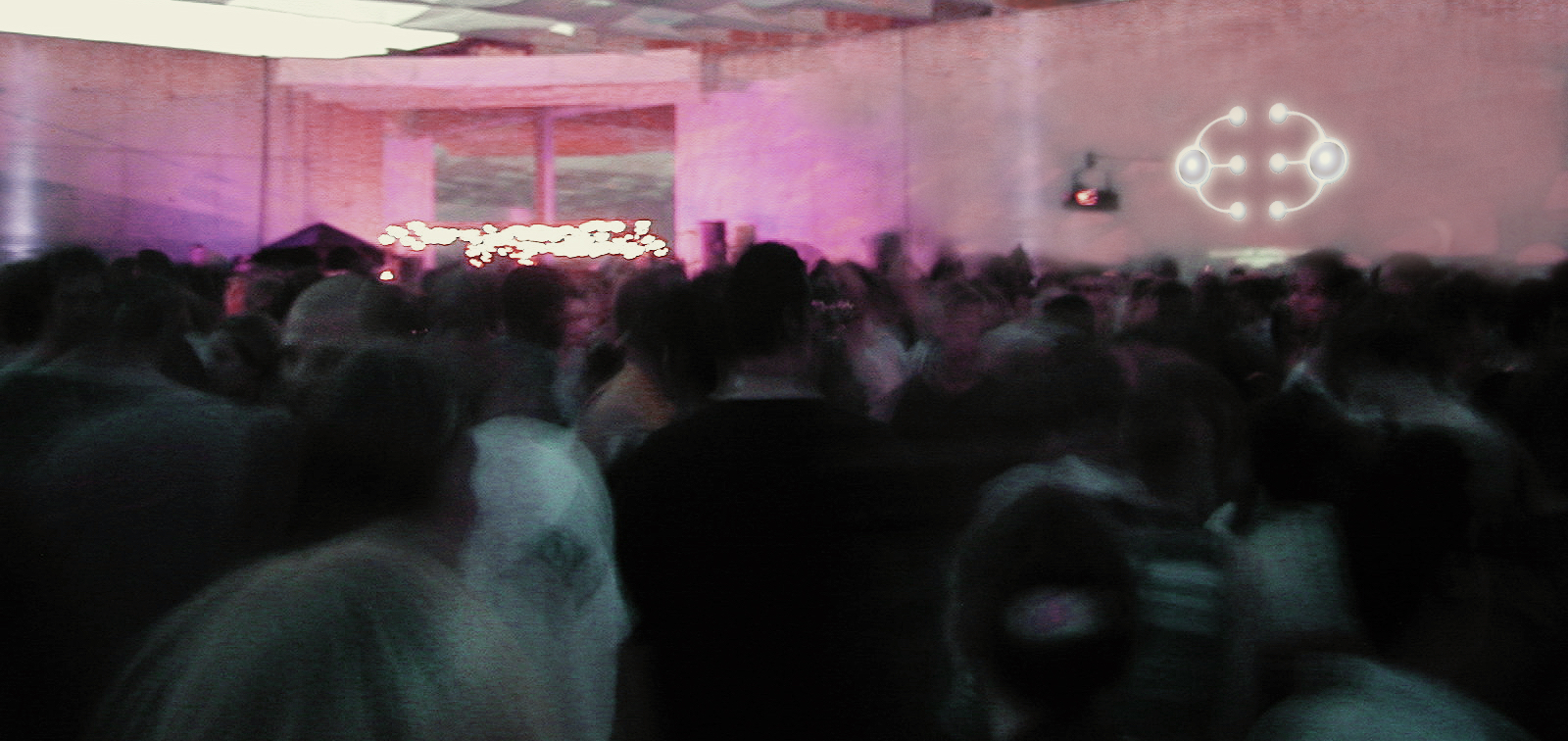
A Zoacode projection by Ebon Fisher, "Equalize Seduction,” is immersed in an event at MoMA-PS1 in 2000. A nurturing interaction with the environment is a feature of many post-postmodern art forms. Event curated by Robert Elmes.

Postmodernism arose after World War II as a reaction to the perceived failings of modernism, whose radical artistic projects had come to be associated with totalitarianism or had been assimilated into mainstream culture. The basic features of what is now called postmodernism can be found as early as the 1940s, most notably in the work of Jorge Luis Borges. However, most scholars today would agree that postmodernism began to compete with modernism in the late 1950s and gained ascendancy over it in the 1960s. Since then, postmodernism has been a dominant, though not undisputed, force in art, literature, film, music, drama, architecture, history, and continental philosophy. Salient features of postmodernism are normally thought to include the ironic play with styles, citations and narrative levels, a metaphysical skepticism or nihilism towards a "grand narrative" of Western culture, a preference for the virtual at the expense of the real (or more accurately, a fundamental questioning of what "the real" constitutes) and a "waning of affect" on the part of the subject, who is caught up in the free interplay of virtual, endlessly reproducible signs inducing a state of consciousness similar to schizophrenia.

Since the late 1990s, there has been a small but growing feeling both in popular culture and in academia that postmodernism "has gone out of fashion." There have been attempts to formulate alternatives to postmodernism, and one of them, Immersionism has entered a number of art history books, but none of the proposed designations has yet become part of mainstream usage.

== The post-postmodern era ==
Consensus on what constitutes an era can not be easily achieved while that era is still in its early stages. However, a common theme of current attempts to define post-postmodernism is emerging as one where dialogue, environmental engagement, sincerity, trust and faith can work to transcend postmodern irony. The following definitions, which vary widely in depth, focus, and scope, are listed in the order of their appearance.

=== Brooklyn's Immersionism ===
In a shift away from the postmodern distancing aesthetics of Manhattan in the 1980s, creative communities in Fort Greene, Greenpoint and Williamsburg, Brooklyn began to cultivate a post-postmodern culture distinguished by social and environmental engagement. According to art historian Jonathan Fineberg, the international community of artists, musicians and writers that gathered near Williamsburg’s abandoned industrial waterfront in the late 1980s and 1990s innovated a new cultural “paradigm" that involved "a richer, more dynamically interacting whole." One of the movement’s earliest manifestoes, You Sub Mod suggests in 1988 that the loss of modernism’s certainty doesn’t require being stuck in a perpetual state of postmodern doubt. As the information ritual pioneer, Ebon Fisher stated in You Sub Mod: “You never believed in modernism and you aren't fooled by its vain reflection, postmodernism... You found that to immerse yourself was the thing, sensing that objectivity was only another dream.” Now referred to as the Brooklyn Immersionists, the Williamsburg scene gave birth to many other terms and prescriptions for environmental immersion and enchantment, including "inject vitality," "omnisensorialism," "close-to-the-pulse,” "web jam,” and “mutual world construction." In his book, The Williamsburg Avant-Garde: Experimental Music and Sound on the Brooklyn Waterfront, Cisco Bradley states:

"In many ways, Immersionism was the next stage of evolution of the New York art scene, which had evolved from the rationalist works of figures like conceptual artist Joseph Kosuth (b. 1945) or minimalist Donald Judd (1928–94) to the postmodern rebellion of the 1980s... As some of the early theorists of Immersionism stated ‘[Immersionists] helped to shift cultural protocols away from cold, postmodern cynicism, towards something a whole lot warmer: immersive, mutual world construction.'"

=== Turner's post-postmodernism ===
In 1995, the landscape architect and urban planner Tom Turner issued a book-length call for a post-postmodern turn in urban planning. Turner criticizes the postmodern credo of "anything goes" and suggests that "the built environment professions are witnessing the gradual dawn of a post-Postmodernism that seeks to temper reason with faith." In particular, Turner argues for the use of timeless organic and geometrical patterns in urban planning. As sources of such patterns he cites, among others, the Taoist-influenced work of the American architect Christopher Alexander, gestalt psychology and the analytical psychologist Carl Jung's concept of archetypes. Regarding terminology, Turner urges people to "embrace post-Postmodernism – and pray for a better name."

=== Epstein's trans-postmodernism ===
In his 1999 book on Russian postmodernism, the Russian-American Slavist Mikhail Epstein suggested that postmodernism "is ... part of a much larger historical formation," which he calls "postmodernity". Epstein believes that postmodernist aesthetics will eventually become entirely conventional and provide the foundation for a new, non-ironic kind of poetry, which he describes using the prefix "trans-":

In considering the names that might possibly be used to designate the new era following "postmodernism," one finds that the prefix "trans" stands out in a special way. The last third of the 20th century developed under the sign of "post," which signalled the demise of such concepts of modernity as "truth" and "objectivity," "soul" and "subjectivity," "utopia" and "ideality," "primary origin" and "originality," "sincerity" and "sentimentality." All of these concepts are now being reborn in the form of "trans-subjectivity," "trans-idealism," "trans-utopianism," "trans-originality," "trans-lyricism," "trans-sentimentality" etc.

As an example Epstein cites the work of the contemporary Russian poet Timur Kibirov.

=== Pseudo-modernism ===
In his 2006 paper The Death of Postmodernism and Beyond, the British scholar Alan Kirby formulated a socio-cultural assessment of post-postmodernism that he calls "pseudo-modernism". Kirby associates pseudo-modernism with the triteness and shallowness resulting from the instantaneous, direct, and superficial participation in culture made possible by the internet, mobile phones, interactive television and similar means: "In pseudo-modernism one phones, clicks, presses, surfs, chooses, moves, downloads."

Pseudo-modernism's "typical intellectual states" are furthermore described as being "ignorance, fanaticism and anxiety" and it is said to produce a "trance-like state" in those participating in it. The net result of this media-induced shallowness and instantaneous participation in trivial events is a "silent autism" superseding "the neurosis of modernism and the narcissism of postmodernism." Kirby sees no aesthetically valuable works coming out of "pseudo-modernism". As examples of its triteness he cites reality TV, interactive news programs, "the drivel found ... on some Wikipedia pages", docu-soaps, and the essayistic cinema of Michael Moore or Morgan Spurlock. In a book published in September 2009 titled Digimodernism: How New Technologies Dismantle the Postmodern and Reconfigure our Culture, Kirby developed further and nuanced his views on culture and textuality in the aftermath of postmodernism.

== Discussion ==
The shallow digital interactivity of which Kirby speaks is in many ways a reconstitution of postmodernism, albeit with greater international participation. A culture predicated on interaction with a machine, especially one tied to algorithms that alienate users from their assumed audience, is an echo of Warhol’s ironic statement, “I want to be a machine.” In contrast, a more profound rejection of corporate machine culture appears in the rich array of organic interactions embodied by the Brooklyn Immersionists, Turner's post-postmodernism and even Epstein’s trans-postmodernism. Fisher’s submodernism, introduced in 1988, encourages a reconnection with an organic substrate or “burrow” that pre-existed modernism, but also anticipates these last three post-postmodern movements. Both Brooklyn submodernism and Immersionism have been discussed as recently as 2023 in Cisco Bradley’s book, The Williamsburg Avant-Garde: Experimental Music and Sound on the Brooklyn Waterfront. The climactic Immersionist event, Organism was discussed in Newsweek in 1993, in Domus in 1998, and more recently cited in Bradley’s book in 2023 and by The New York Times in 2024.

== See also ==
- Altermodern
- Cold War
- Dogme 95
- Excessivism
- Integral theory (Ken Wilber)
- Brooklyn Immersionists
- Kitsch movement
- Maximalism
- Metamodernism
- Neo-minimalism
- New Puritans
- New Sincerity
- New Urbanism
- Post-irony
- Post-truth
- Pseudorealism
- Radical orthodoxy
- Remodernism
- Stuckism
- Transmodernism
