= Immersionism =

Immersionism may refer to:

- Brooklyn Immersionists
- Immersion journalism
- Immersion baptism
