= Praxis (art collaborative) =

Art duo of Brainard Carey and Delia Bajo

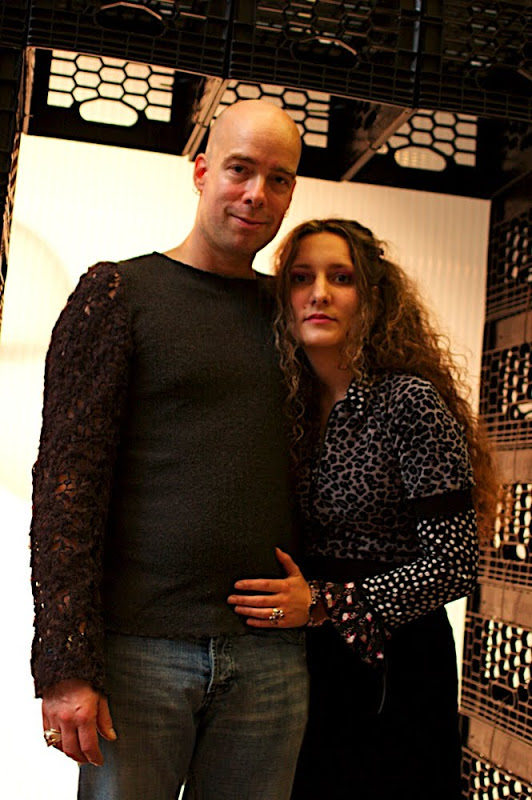
- Carey and Bajo at the Whitney Museum, 2014
- Born: October 7, 1968 (Brainard Carey); November 2, 1974 (Delia Bajo); United States (Brainard Carey); Spain (Delia Bajo)
- Known for: Conceptual Art / Artist Collaborative
- Website: museumofnonvisibleart.com/praxis/

Praxis is an art collaborative composed of a husband and wife team. Brainard Carey (born October 7, 1968) is an American; Delia Bajo (born November 2, 1974) is a Spaniard. They live and work in New York City and New Haven, Connecticut.

== History ==
Praxis was formed in 1999. They had their first major exhibition in The Whitney Biennial in 2002 and they were reviewed by the critic and philosopher Arthur Danto for The Nation.

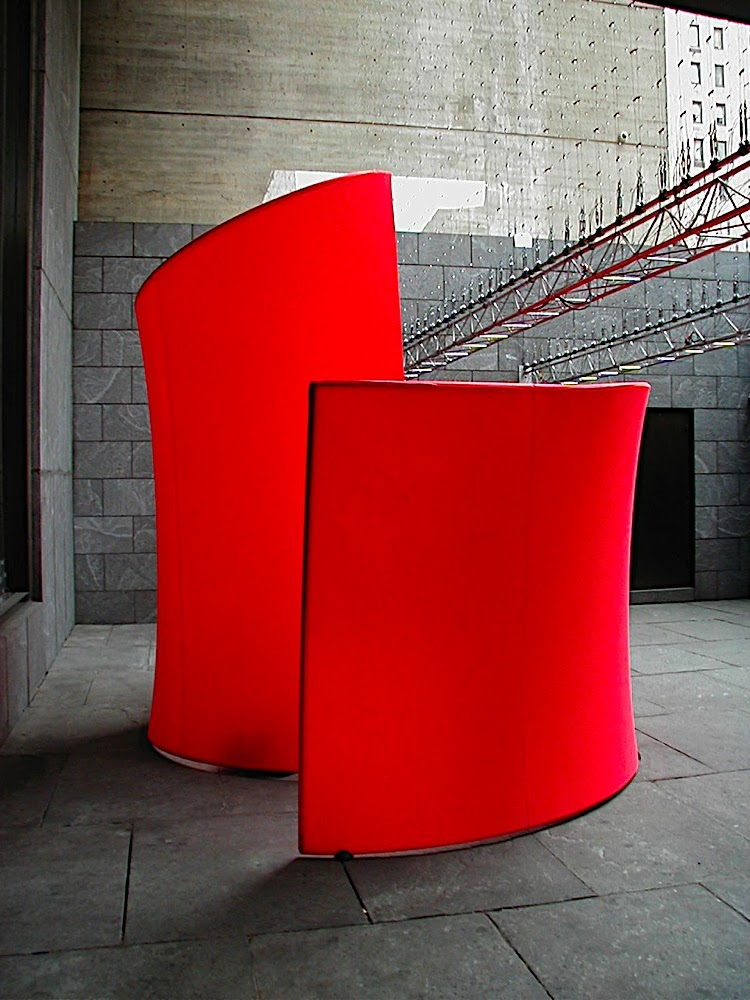
Whitney Museum of American Art, 2002, Praxis. Photo courtesy of Praxis

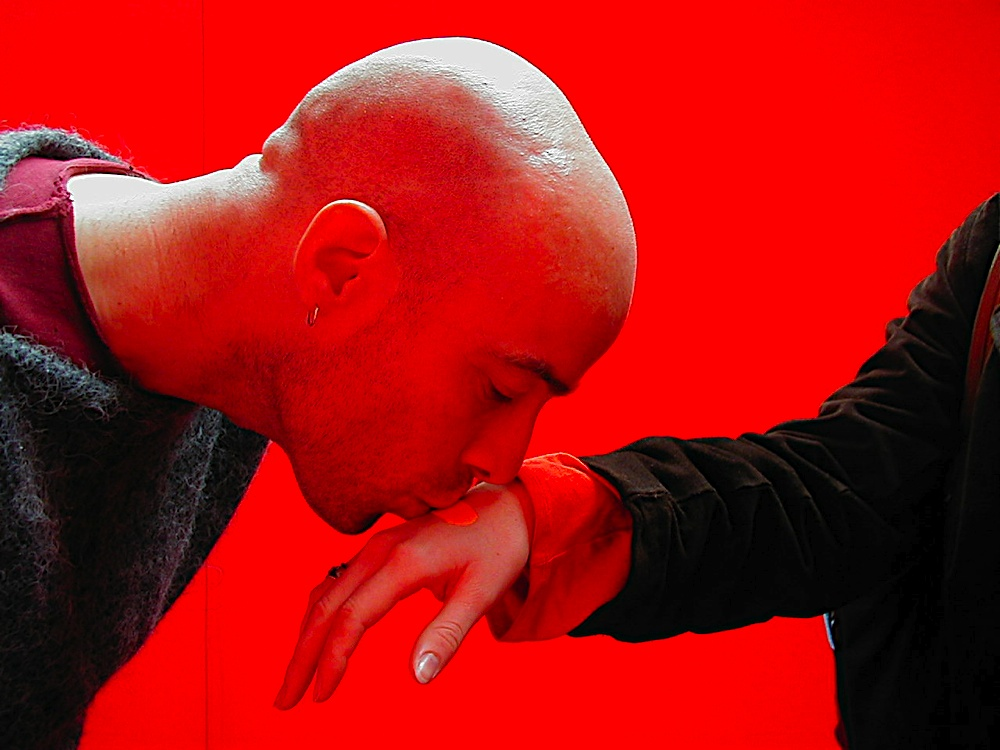
Whitney Museum of American Art, 2002, Praxis. Photo courtesy of Praxis

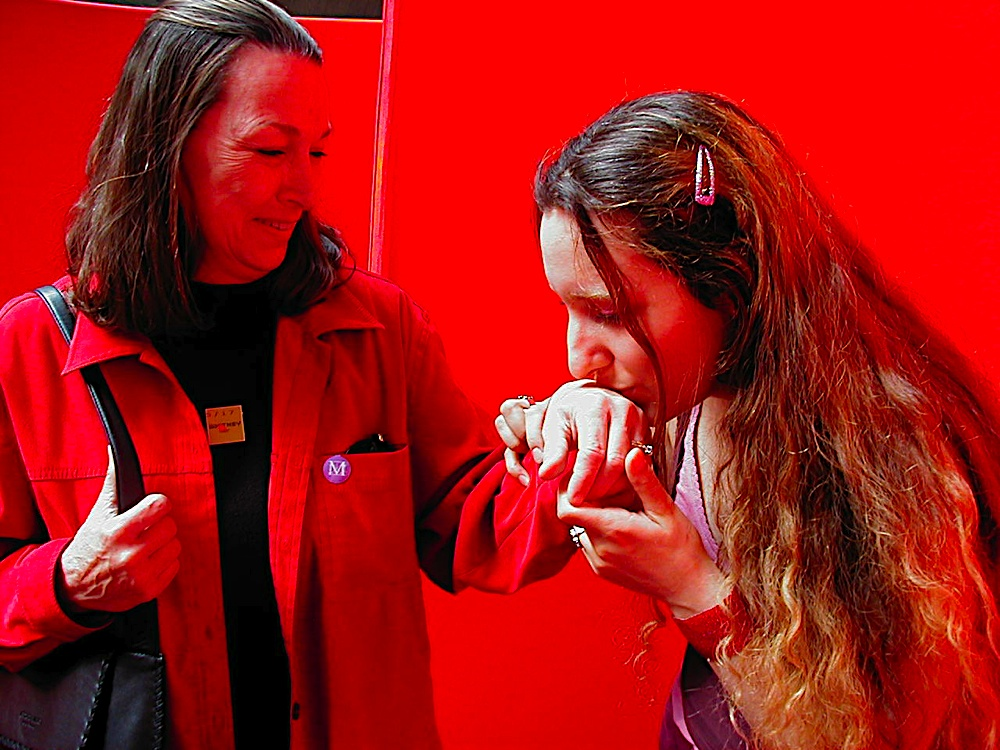
Whitney Museum of American Art, 2002, Praxis. Photo courtesy of Praxis

As Debra Singer said in the Whitney Biennial catalog that year, "As part of an ongoing performance project, this two-person collaborative team offers gallery visitors a menu of four free services: foot washes, hugs, Band-Aid applications to help heal visible or non-visible wounds, and gifts of dollar bills. Their interactive, nurturing performances offer alternative modes of economic and social exchange that serve as a comforting antidote to the potentially alienating effects of a world often dominated by technology and consumerism."

=== Theatrical work ===
Praxis continued making interactive work and in 2005 was commissioned to create a theatrical work for artistic director Vallejo Gantner for his first show at Performance Space 122 in New York City.

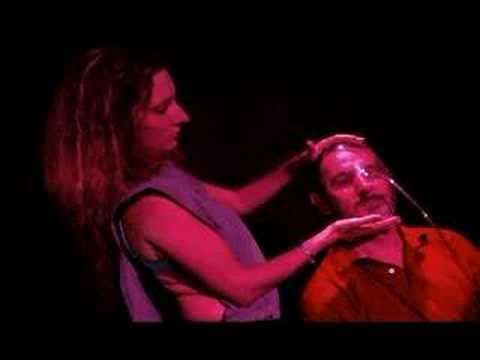
Praxis in Forget Me Not at Performance Space 122.

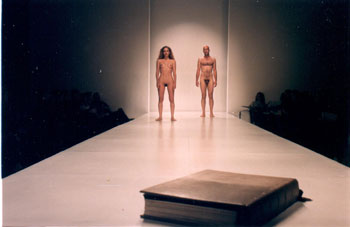
Praxis in Forget Me Not at Performance Space 122.

=== Solo show at Whitney Museum ===
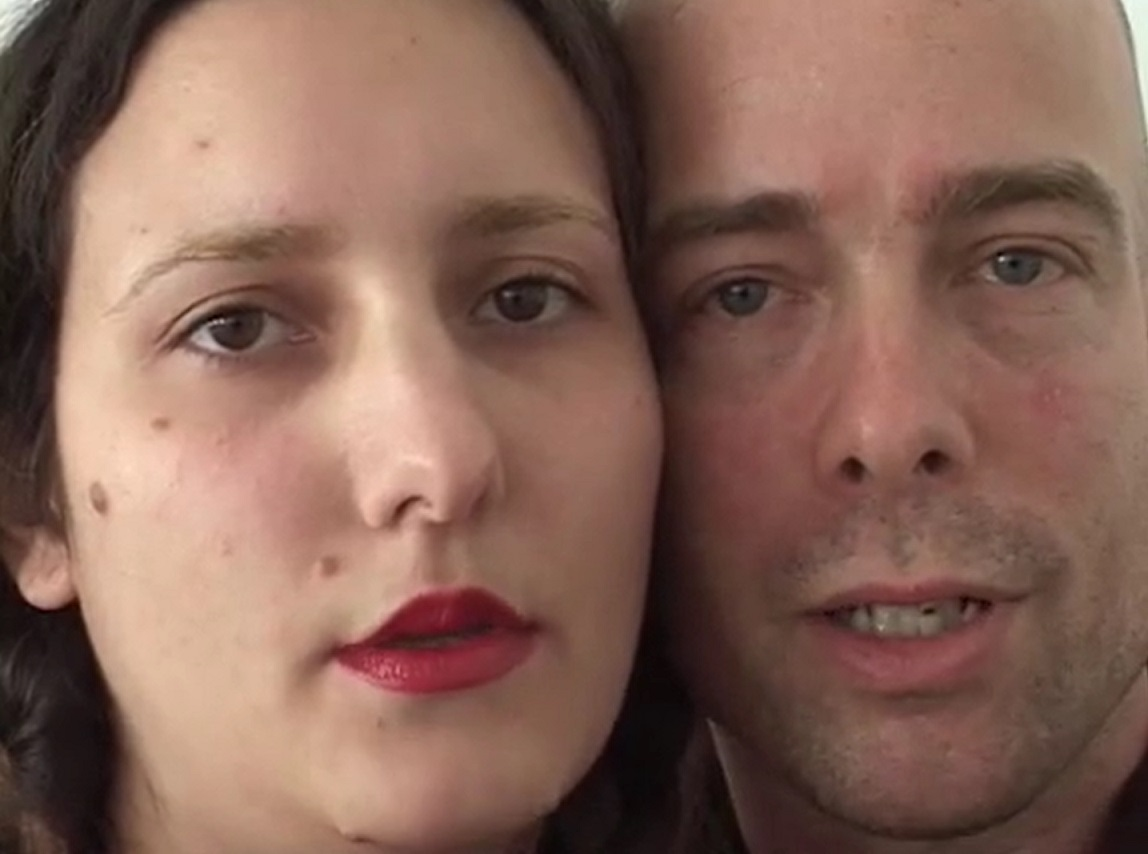
Praxis in Speaking Portraits

In 2007, they had a solo show at the Whitney Museum of American Art curated and commissioned by Shamim Momin.

=== Museum of Non-Visible Art ===
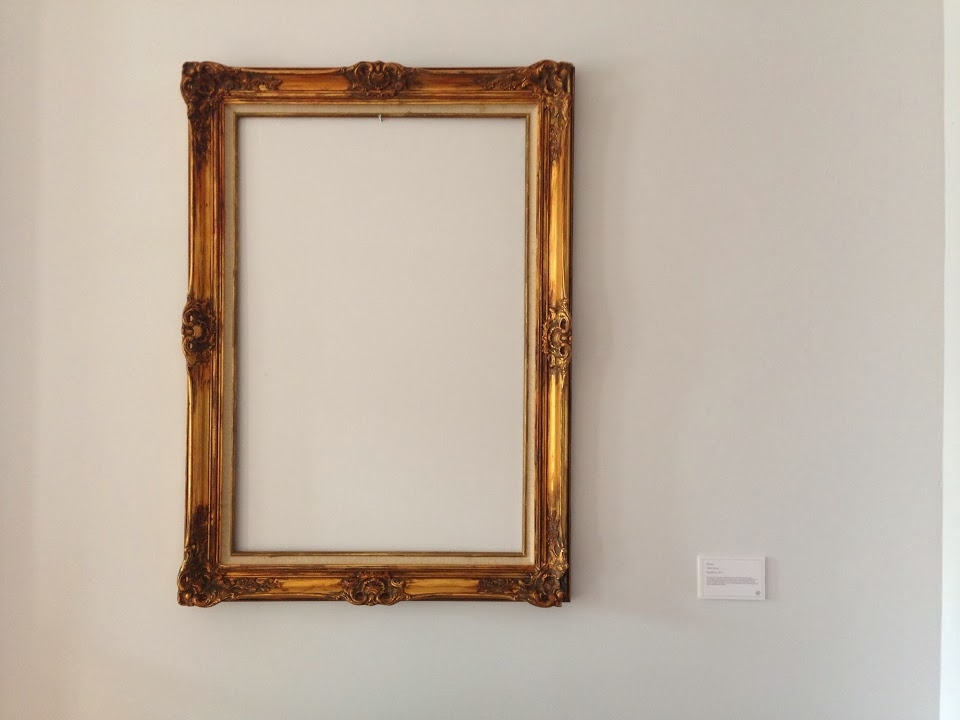
Museum of Non-visible Art, Installation in Harlem, NY

They produced numerous projects and artworks in between major shows, and in 2011 they launched their Museum of Non-Visible Art on Kickstarter with James Franco as a collaborator.

The project was successfully funded and drew international press including James Franco discussing the project on Jimmy Kimmel Live. The reaction from the art community and the general public was mixed. In various press and blog pieces, the project was celebrated as a powerful project in the art world and also raised many questions about what art actually is, and why it becomes valuable.

== Publications ==
Currently, Praxis (Brainard Carey and Delia Bajo, also known as Delia Carey) are writing books and developing their museum of non-visible art. They have written two books published by Skyhorse in New York City, The Art of Hugging and The School of Wishing.

== See also ==
- Site-Specific Art
- Visual arts of the United States
- Art exhibition
