= Cisco Bradley =

American historian and public intellectual

Francis Remple “Cisco” Bradley
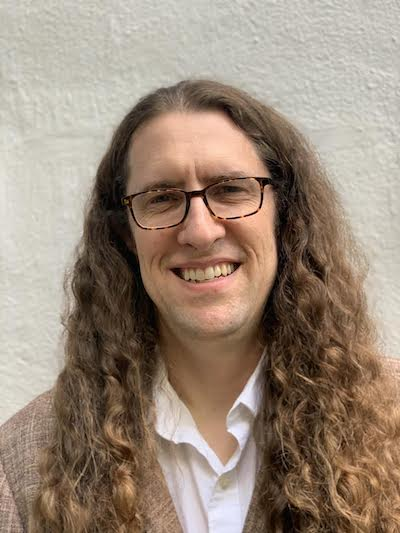
- Bradley in 2023
- Born: October 9, 1976 (age 49); Billings, Montana, U.S.
- Education: University of Wisconsin-Madison (B.A.; M.A.; Ph.D.)
- Occupation: Historian
- Employer(s): Hamilton College (2010-2011), Pratt Institute (2011-present)
- Title: Cisco Bradley

Cisco Bradley (born October 9, 1976) is an American historian known for his work on music, migration, and cultural production. In 2021, he published Universal Tonality: The Life and Music of William Parker with Duke University Press after approaching William Parker in 2015 about an interview. Themes in his work center on social resistance through cultural expression, migration and community formation.

== Early life ==
Bradley was born in Billings, Montana. His father, Charles Crane Bradley Jr., was a teacher and social worker. His mother, Susanna Louise Remple, was also a teacher. Bradley's parents met at Colorado College in the mid-1960s, while involved in anti-war activism. His father was a historian who wrote the first history of the Crow Indian Tribe. Bradley's older brother, Daniel Charles Bradley, is a physicist. His paternal grandfather, Charles Crane Bradley Sr., was a professor of geology and dean of students at Montana State University. His step-grandmother was Nina Leopold Bradley, the daughter of Aldo Leopold, widely regarded as the founding figure in American environmentalist thought.

In childhood, Bradley was exposed to environmentalist and left-wing working class activism. Bradley's maternal grandparent, Sterner Ash Remple, worked his whole life for a railroad company and was a union member. His grandmother, Lois Anne Weber, was a conservative Catholic convert in the 1950s and remained an ardent member of the church until it refused to take a staunch oppositional stance against the Vietnam War, which she considered to be immoral. She then became an atheist and Marxist, joining the Socialist Workers’ Party (SWP). She ran for lieutenant governor of Colorado on the SWP ticket in 1984.

== Academic life ==
Bradley first considered becoming a historian in his pre-teen years and spent four years after college traveling and working abroad. He taught English in Prague, Czech Republic.

He entered graduate school to study Islamic history, first intending to focus on the Middle East, but soon shifted to Southeast Asia. The work of Michael Chamberlain, Pierre Bourdieu and Michel Foucault compelled him to closely examine social history, social disparities, and hierarchies of power. He eventually focused on cultural expressions of dissent and resistance to hegemonic power.

His doctoral dissertation examined how Islamic textualism became the most dynamic social force in the Malay-Thai borderland in the eighteenth and nineteenth centuries. On a Fulbright Fellowship, he spent time in southern Thailand and in Malaysia during the years that the Malay minority led an insurgency against the Thai government. He concluded his graduate studies with the Charlotte W. Newcombe doctoral dissertation fellowship in religion and ethics from the Woodrow Wilson Foundation (which later was renamed the Institute for Citizens and Scholars).

== Career ==
After graduating with his Ph.D. in 2010, Bradley taught at Hamilton College for one year before taking a job at the Pratt Institute. At Pratt, his area of focus shifted to American cultural networks, especially involving music, cultural production, and migration. In 2014, he co-founded Talk Race Forum with vocalist, composer, and educator Fay Victor. They co-hosted over 30 events in formal and informal settings involving artists, musicians, and academics. The project concluded in 2018.

== Historical contributions ==
In 2013, Bradley founded Jazz Right Now, as a review of the Brooklyn experimental music scene. The website quickly became an active archive of the music scene through interviews, reviews and artist features. It is now an extensive record of artist profiles, videos, sessionographies, photos, and various related information.

In 2016, with the success of Jazz Right Now, Bradley began to work closely with bassist and composer William Parker, publishing the latter's biography, Universal Tonality, in 2021. The book rooted his life in the Great Migration, tracing his ancestry back to Africa. Cultural theorist Fred Moten called it "an intellectual history of the jazz artist." The book chronicled Parker's evolution from the jazz lofts of the 1970s, his work with pianist Cecil Taylor in the 1980s, and his rise as a bandleader from the 1990s onwards. He is one of the central figures of the New York free jazz scene. Moten also wrote of the book, “Writing elegantly about the music as well as William Parker’s work as an activist and organizer, Cisco Bradley gives a full sense of Parker’s centrality to the development and maintenance of the free jazz scene in New York as well as his efforts in presenting the music across the globe.” The interviews he did with Parker came to form the beginnings of the Free Jazz Oral History Project, which aimed to document, preserve, and make publicly available interviews with all of the living free jazz artists who were active in the 1960s and 1970s. The archive currently contains nearly 500 interviews.

Bradley next turned his attention to writing an account of Brooklyn's experimental music scene, specifically at its epicenter in the neighborhood of Williamsburg in the era 1988–2014, which shifted the focus to several younger generations of musicians working in New York with the book The Williamsburg Avant-Garde. The book centered on Brooklyn as a microcosm of American gentrification, pushing artists, musicians, and other cultural creators out of vital urban centers. Gentrification as a hindrance to culture is one of Bradley's primary explanations for American creative stagnation.

Bradley founded the now-defunct non-profit organization New Revolution Arts in 2014, which organized experimental music, art, and poetry events in New York City. His programmed events involved performers such as William Parker, Cooper-Moore, Daniel Carter, Craig Taborn, Mat Maneri, Mary Halvorson, Nate Wooley, Ches Smith, Fay Victor, James Brandon Lewis, Luke Stewart, Jessica Pavone, Sarah Bernstein, Paul r. Harding, and No Land. He also organized and produced the New York Tenor Saxophone Festival in 2015 and the Loud Week Festival in 2018. In 2016–2017, he was the manager of the poetry-jazz big band Heroes Are Gang Leaders, led by James Brandon Lewis and Thomas Sayers Ellis.

== Publications ==
=== Books ===
- Bradley, Cisco (2023-04-05). The Williamsburg Avant-Garde. Durham: Duke University Press. ISBN 978-1-4780-1674-8.
- Universal Tonality: The Life and Music of William Parker. Durham: Duke University Press, 2021.
- Forging Islamic Power and Place: The Legacy of Shaykh Da’ud bin ‘Abd Allah al-Fatani in Mecca and Southeast Asia. Honolulu: University of Hawaii Press, 2016.

=== Articles ===
- “Bass and Voice: Sheila Jordan Discusses Race, Class, and the Emergence of Her Concept.” Jazz and Culture 5, no. 1 (2022): 76-89.
- “Women, Violence, and Gender Dynamics during the Five Patani-Siam Wars, 1785-1838.” Itinerario 45, no. 3 (2021): Special Issue 3: Coercing Mobility: Territory and Displacement in the Politics of Southeast Asian Muslim Movements, 345-63.
- “Islamic Reform, the Family, and Knowledge Networks Linking Mecca with Southeast Asia in the Nineteenth Century.” Journal of Asia Studies 74, no. 1 (Feb 2014): 89-111.
- “Shaykh Da’ud al-Fatani’s Munyat al-Musalli and the Place of Prayer in Nineteenth-century Patani Communities,” in special issue “Global Conjunctions in the Indian Ocean World: Malay World Textual Trajectories,” in Indonesia and the Malay World 41, no. 120 (2014): 198-214.
- “Siam’s Conquest of Patani and the End of Mandala Relations, 1786-1838,” in Ghosts of the Past in Southern Thailand: Essays on the History and Historiography of Patani, ed. Patrick Jory. Singapore: National University of Singapore Press, 2013.
- “Moral Order in a Time of Damnation: The Hikayat Patani in Historical Context.” Journal of Southeast Asia Studies 40, no. 2 (2009): 267-93.
- “Piracy, Smuggling, and Trade in the Rise of Patani, 1490-1600.” Journal of the Siam Society 96 (2008): 27-50.
- “Sheikh Daud bin Abdullah’s Writings Contained in the National Library of Malaysia.” Jurnal Filologi Melayu 16 (2007): 121–41.
