= Cybernetic art =

Contemporary art form

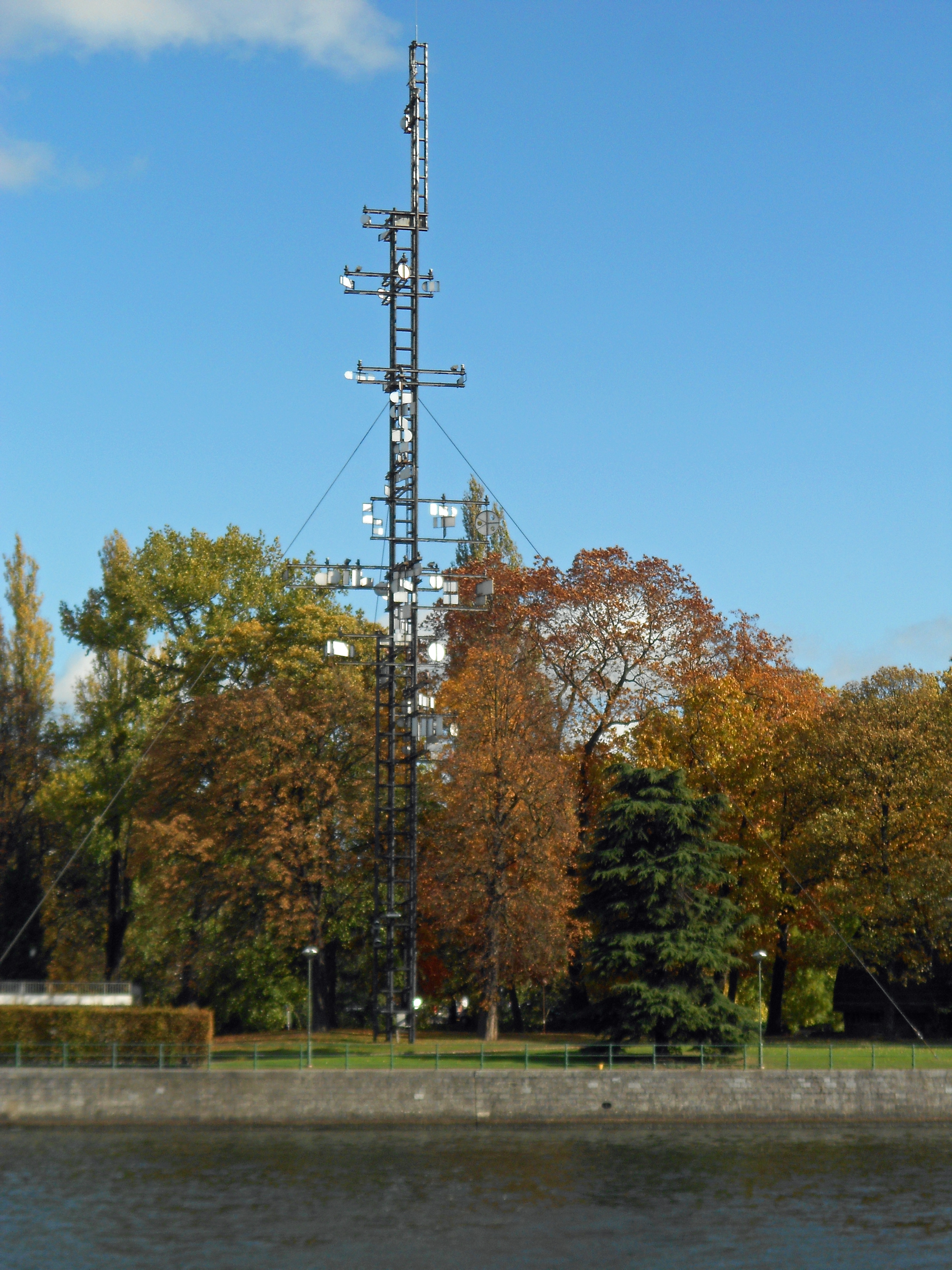
Cybernetic tower by N. Schöffer in Liège

Cybernetic art is contemporary art that builds upon the legacy of cybernetics, where feedback involved in the work takes precedence over traditional aesthetic and material concerns. The relationship between cybernetics and art can be summarised in three ways: cybernetics can be used to study art, to create works of art or may itself be regarded as an art form in its own right.

== History ==
Nicolas Schöffer's CYSP I (1956) was perhaps the first artwork to explicitly employ cybernetic principles (CYSP is an acronym that joins the first two letters of the words "CYbernetic" and "SPatiodynamic"). The artist Roy Ascott elaborated an extensive theory of cybernetic art in "Behaviourist Art and the Cybernetic Vision" (Cybernetica, Journal of the International Association for Cybernetics (Namur), Volume IX, No.4, 1966; Volume X No.1, 1967) and in "The Cybernetic Stance: My Process and Purpose" (Leonardo Vol 1, No 2, 1968). Art historian Edward A. Shanken has written about the history of art and cybernetics in essays including "Cybernetics and Art: Cultural Convergence in the 1960s" and "From Cybernetics to Telematics: The Art, Pedagogy, and Theory of Roy Ascott"(2003), which traces the trajectory of Ascott's work from cybernetic art to telematic art (art using computer networking as its medium, a precursor to net.art.)

Audio feedback and the use of tape loops, sound synthesis, and computer generated compositions reflected a cybernetic awareness of information, systems, and cycles. Such techniques became widespread in the 1960s in the music industry. The visual effects of electronic feedback became a focus of artistic research in the late 1960s, when video equipment first reached the consumer market. Steina and Woody Vasulka, for example, used "all manner and combination of audio and video signals to generate electronic feedback in their respective of corresponding media."

With related work by Edward Ihnatowicz, Wen-Ying Tsai and cybernetician Gordon Pask and the animist kinetics of Robert Breer and Jean Tinguely, the 1960s produced a strain of cyborg art that was very much concerned with the shared circuits within and between the living and the technological. A line of cyborg art theory also emerged during the late 1960s. Writers like Jonathan Benthall and Gene Youngblood drew on cybernetics and cybernetic. The most substantial contributors here were the British artist and theorist Roy Ascott with his essay "Behaviourist Art and the Cybernetic Vision" in the journal Cybernetica (1976), and the American critic and theorist Jack Burnham. In "Beyond Modern Sculpture" from 1968 he builds cybernetic art into an extensive theory that centers on art's drive to imitate and ultimately reproduce life.

Cybernetic Serendipity: The Computer and the Arts curated by Jasia Reichardt at the Institute of Contemporary Arts, London, England in 1968 is attributed at being one of the first exhibition of cybernetic art.

Composer Herbert Brün participated in the Biological Computer Laboratory and was later involved in the founding of the School for Designing a Society.

Leading art theorists and historians in this field include Christiane Paul (curator), Frank Popper, Christine Buci-Glucksmann, Dominique Moulon, Robert C. Morgan, Roy Ascott, Margot Lovejoy, Edmond Couchot, Fred Forest and Edward A. Shanken. Others in the creative arts who are associated with cybernetics include Roland Kayn, Ruairi Glynn, Pauline Oliveros, Tom Scholte, and Stephen Willats.

== See also ==
- Artificial intelligence art
- Cyborg art
- Computer art
- Conceptual art
- Cyberarts
- Cybism
- Digital sublime
- Electronic art
- Generative art
- Internet art
- Neo-conceptual art
- New media art
- Post-conceptual art
- Post-convergent
- Postminimalism
- Postmodern art
- Systems art
- Virtual art
