= Post-conceptual art =

Art theory

Post-conceptual, postconceptual, post-conceptualism or postconceptualism is an art theory that builds upon the legacy of conceptual art in contemporary art, where the concept(s) or idea(s) involved in the work take some precedence over traditional aesthetic and material concerns. The term first came into art school parlance through the influence of John Baldessari at the California Institute of the Arts in the early 1970s. The writer Eldritch Priest, specifically ties John Baldessari's piece Throwing four balls in the air to get a square (best of 36 tries) from 1973 (in which the artist attempted to do just that, photographing the results, and eventually selecting the best out of 36 tries, with 36 being the determining number as that is the standard number of shots on a roll of 35mm film) as an early example of post-conceptual art. It is now often connected to generative art and digital art production.

== As art practice ==
Post-conceptualism as an art practice has also been connected to the work of Robert C. Morgan, specifically his Turkish Bath installation at Artists Space in 1976, and in Morgan's writing in Between Modernism and Conceptual Art: A Critical Response from 1997. It has been connected to the work of Robert Smithson, Mel Bochner, Vera Molnár, Robert Barry, Peter Nagy, Rutherford Chang, François Morellet, Jennifer Bolande, Yves Klein, Piero Manzoni, Lygia Clark, Roy Ascott, Joseph Nechvatal, Allan McCollum, Harold Cohen, Mary Kelly, Annette Lemieux, Matt Mullican, and the intermedia concept employed in the mid-sixties by Fluxus artist Dick Higgins.

== As specific condition ==
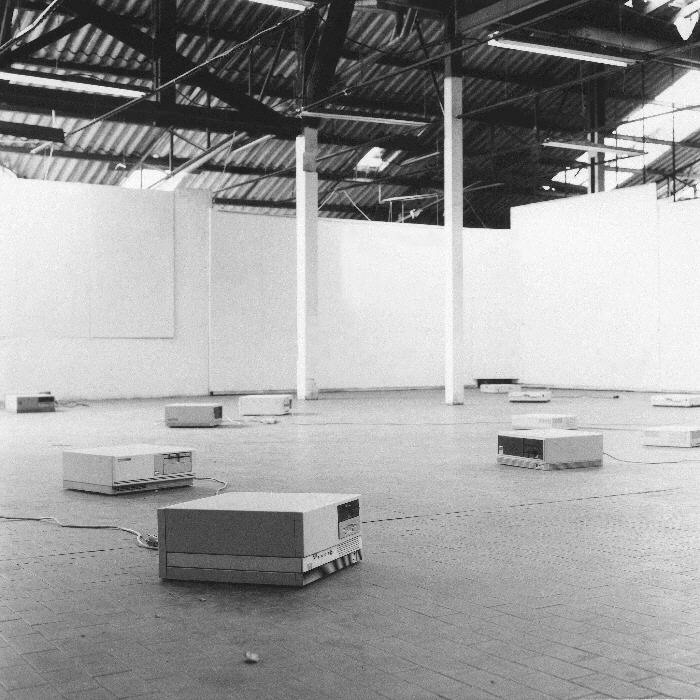
Maurizio Bolognini, Sealed Computers (Nice, France, 1997). This installation uses computer codes to create endless flows of random images which will never be accessible for viewing. Images are continuously generated but they are prevented from becoming a physical artwork.

Conceptual art focused attention on the idea behind the art object and questioned the traditional role of that object as the conveyor of meaning. Subsequently, those theories cast doubt upon the necessity of materiality itself as conceptual artists "de-materialized" the art object and began to produce time-based and ephemeral artworks. Although total dematerialization of the art object never occurred, the art object became flexible – malleable – and that malleability, coupled with semiotics and computer processing, has resulted in the post-conceptual art object.

== As general condition ==
Conceptual art at the end of the 20th Century spread to become a general tendency, a resonance within art practice that became nearly ubiquitous. Thus the widespread use of the term “post-conceptual” as a prefix to painting such as that of Gerhard Richter and photography such as that of Andreas Gursky. Benjamin Buchloh in Art After Conceptual Art points out that post-conceptual art is already emerging in the late 1970s and early 1980s in the photo-based appropriation art of Martha Rosler, Louise Lawler, Cindy Sherman, Peter Nagy, Barbara Kruger, Sherrie Levine, Barbara Rosenthal, and Dara Birnbaum.

The idea of post-conceptual art was clearly articulated by Tricia Collins and Richard Milazzo in the early 1980s in New York City, when within their Collins & Milazzo Exhibitions they brought to prominence a new generation of conceptual artists through their copious writings and curatorial activity. It was their exhibitions and writings that originally fashioned the theoretical context for a new kind of neo (or post) conceptual art; one that argued simultaneously against Neo-Expressionism and The Pictures Generation.

British philosopher and theorist of conceptual art Peter Osborne makes the point that "post-conceptual art is not the name for a particular type of art so much as the historical-ontological condition for the production of contemporary art in general...." Osborne first noted that contemporary art is post-conceptual in a public lecture delivered at the Fondazione Antonio Ratti, Villa Sucota in Como on July 9, 2010. Osborne's main thesis is that the convergence and mutual conditioning of historical transformations in the ontology of the artwork and the social relations of art space make contemporary art possible.

== See also ==
- Artificial intelligence art
- Computer art
- Cyberarts
- Electronic art
- Internet art
- Neo-conceptual art
- New Media Art
- Post-convergent
- Postdigital
- Postminimalism
- Postmodern art
- Systems art
- Virtual art
