= Virtual art =

Art involving virtual environments and interactive technologies

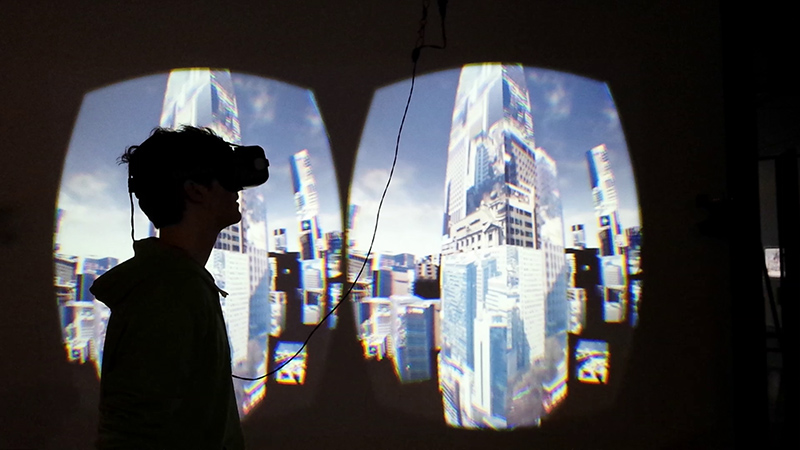
10.000 Moving Cities, Virtual Art, Marc Lee

Virtual art is a term used for artistic practices involving computer-generated environments, interactive systems and other technologies that allow viewers to experience or influence virtual spaces. It includes works using virtual reality, augmented reality, telepresence and computer-based installations.

The term has been used with different scopes. In Virtual Art: From Illusion to Immersion (2003), art historian Oliver Grau examines virtual art through the history of immersion and illusion, including interactive digital environments. Frank Popper adopts a broader definition in From Technological to Virtual Art (2007), covering digital, multimedia, interactive and network-based art.

== Definition ==
Some forms of virtual art have been discussed in terms of post-convergent creative practice, bringing together techniques from different media within interactive digital environments. Adam Nash uses the term in relation to artistic work in multi-user virtual environments. Earlier approaches to the relationship between art and technology can be found in Jack Burnham's Beyond Modern Sculpture (1968) and Gene Youngblood's Expanded Cinema (1970). Virtual art may involve virtual reality, augmented reality or mixed reality, technologies also used in video games and film.

In his book From Technological to Virtual Art, Frank Popper traces the development of immersive, interactive new media art from its historical antecedents through digital art, computer art, cybernetic art, multimedia and net art. He regards contemporary virtual art as both an extension of the technological art of the late twentieth century and a departure from it. Popper identifies several distinctive characteristics, including the humanization of technology, an emphasis on interactivity, an interest in the relationship between the real and the virtual, and the involvement of multiple senses. He also argues that artists working in virtual art combine aesthetic concerns with technological experimentation. Their "extra-artistic" goals, connected to their artistic intentions, may involve science, society and basic human needs.

To explain the emergence of what he calls a techno-aesthetic, Popper examines virtual art across different generations of artists and technological developments. He places particular emphasis on openness, both in artistic creation and in the participation and responses of viewers. Popper connects this understanding of interactive art to the theories of Umberto Eco and other aestheticians, particularly Eco's concept of the open work.

== Artists ==
Virtual art can be seen in worlds like Second Life, and Inworldz virtual environments in which anything is possible to the user, who is represented by an avatar. In the virtual world, the avatar's abilities ranges from ordinary walking to flying. The environment and scenery of such environments is similar to the real world, except that it can be altered by the avatar. Worlds like Inworldz and Second Life feature an editor which allows the user to build his or her own experience just the way he or she wants it to be. The user is not bounded by physics or improbabilities that he or she faces in the real world.

Virtual art is made with many computer programs and has no boundaries, so it uses animations, movies, computer games and so on. As it becomes more and more popular and important, it results in people being able to live another virtual life. With the advancements in technology, virtual art has transformed and evolved quickly from simple 8-bit representations to 3D models containing millions of polygons.

== Artists ==
Artists and collectives discussed in studies of virtual art include:

- ART+COM
- Maurice Benayoun
- Char Davies
- Monika Fleischmann
- Ken Goldberg
- Agnes Hegedüs
- Jenny Holzer
- Eduardo Kac
- Knowbotic Research
- Myron Krueger
- Brenda Laurel
- John Maeda
- Michael Naimark
- Nam June Paik
- Simon Penny
- Paul Sermon
- Jeffrey Shaw
- Karl Sims
- Stelarc
- Igor Stromajer

== See also ==
- Virtualization
- Visual arts

== Bibliography ==
- Grau, Oliver; Hoth, Janina; Wandl-Vogt, Eveline, eds. (2019). Digital Art through the Looking Glass: New Strategies for Archiving, Collecting and Preserving in Digital Humanities. Krems an der Donau: Edition Donau-Universität Krems. ISBN 9783903150515.
- Grau, Oliver; Coones, Wendy; Rühse, Viola, eds. (2017). Museum and Archive on the Move: Changing Cultural Institutions in the Digital Era. Berlin: De Gruyter. ISBN 9783110520514.
- Muñoz Morcillo, Jesús; Faion, Florian; Zea, Antonio; Hanebeck, Uwe D.; Robertson-von Trotha, Caroline Y. (2016). "e-Installation: Synesthetic Documentation of Media Art via Telepresence Technologies". In Boştenaru Dan, Maria; Crăciun, Cerasella (eds.). Space and Time Visualisation. Springer. pp. 173–191. doi:10.1007/978-3-319-24942-1_11. ISBN 9783319249421.
- Popper, Frank (2007). From Technological to Virtual Art. Leonardo. MIT Press. ISBN 9780262162302.
- Gere, Charlie (2006). Art, Time and Technology. Culture Machine. Berg. ISBN 9781845201357.
- Paul, Christiane (2003). Digital Art. World of Art. Thames & Hudson. ISBN 9780500203675.
- Nechvatal, Joseph (Winter 2004). "Frank Popper and Virtualised Art". Tema Celeste (101): 48–53.
- Nechvatal, Joseph (2004). "Origins of Virtualism: An Interview with Frank Popper". Art Journal. 63 (1): 62–77. doi:10.1080/00043249.2004.10791116.
- Lieser, Wolf (2009). Digital Art. Cologne: h.f. ullmann. ISBN 9783833153389.
- Popper, Frank (1975). Art, Action and Participation. New York: New York University Press. ISBN 9780814765630.
- Baranski, Sandrine (2010). La musique en réseau: une musique de la complexité ? (in French). Éditions universitaires européennes. ISBN 9786131507441.
- Grau, Oliver (2003). Virtual Art: From Illusion to Immersion. Leonardo. Cambridge, Massachusetts: MIT Press. ISBN 9780262072410.
- Popper, Frank (1997). Art of the Electronic Age. Thames & Hudson. ISBN 9780500279182.
