= Margot Lovejoy =

American artist and art historian

- Born: October 21, 1930; New Brunswick, Canada
- Died: August 1, 2019 (aged 88)
- Known for: Artist, art historian

Margot Lovejoy (21 October 1930 – 1 August 2019) was a digital artist and historian of art and technology. She was Professor Emerita of Visual Arts at the State University of New York at Purchase. She was the author of Digital Currents: Art in the Electronic Age. Lovejoy was the recipient of a 1987 Guggenheim Fellowship and a 1994 Arts International Grant in India.

== Digital Currents ==
In her best known historic work, Digital Currents: Art in the Electronic Age, Lovejoy followed on the research of Frank Popper, Jack Burnham and Gene Youngblood by documenting the historical record of the relationship between technology and art as culminating in digital art. Lovejoy recounted the early histories of electronic media for art making (video, computer art, the Internet) by providing a context for the works of major artists in each media, describing their projects, and discussing the issues and theoretical implications of each to create a foundation for understanding this developing field of digital art.

In Digital Currents she explored the growing impact of digital technologies on aesthetic experience and examined the major changes taking place in the role of the artist as social communicator. She demonstrated that just as the rise of photographic techniques in the mid-19th century shattered traditional views about representation, so too have contemporary electronic tools catalyzed new perspectives on art, affecting the way artists see, think, and work, and the ways in which their productions are distributed and communicated.

== Websites ==
Her website Parthenia was archived by the Walker Art Center as part adaweb.com and her website TURNS was featured in the 2002 Whitney Museum Biennial. Her work is in the collection of the National Museum of Women in the Arts

== Publications ==
- Digital Currents: Art in the Electronic Age
- Postmodern Currents: Art and Artists in the Age of Electronic Media
- Labyrinth (1991)
- The Book of Plagues (1995)
- Paradoxic mutations
- Manifestations

== Awards ==
- 1987: Guggenheim Fellowship
- 1994: Arts International Grant, India

== Solo exhibitions ==
- Alternative Museum, New York
- P.S. 1 Contemporary Art Center, New York
- Newhouse Center for Contemporary Art, New York
- Queens Museum of Art, New York
- Neuberger Museum of Art, New York
- Stamford Museum, New York
- Islip Museum, New York
