= Expanded cinema =

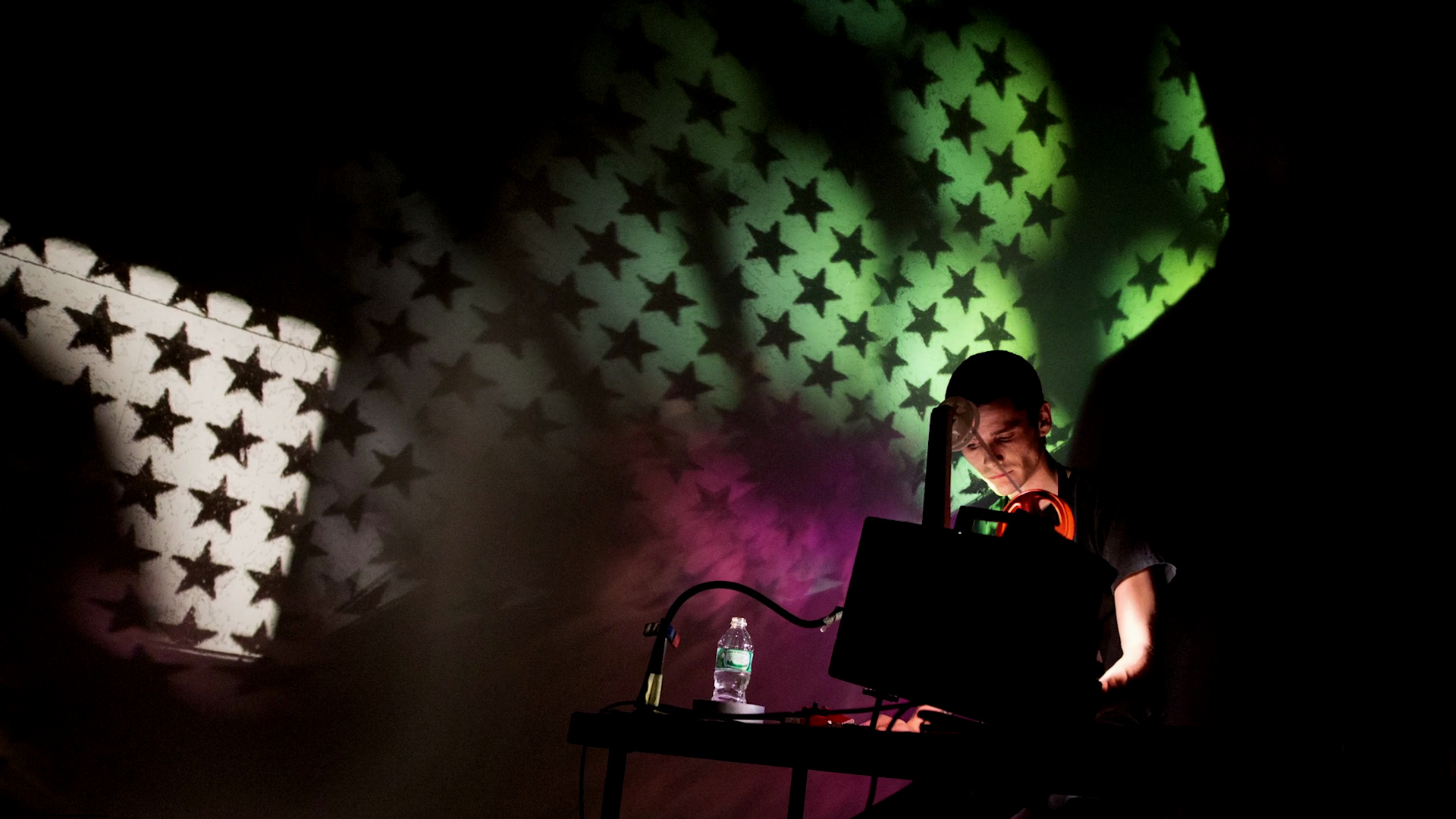
A film performance at a Mono No Aware exhibition for expanded cinema

Expanded cinema is an artistic practice that extends film and video work beyond the traditional boundaries of cinema projection. It often includes elements of live performance, multiple projection, site-specificity, or interactivity.

== History ==
Expanded cinema emerged as part of a broader trend in hybridizing or expanding media to develop more complex artistic forms, through intermedia and mixed media. Artists who approached moving image work contended with the conventions around presentation and spectatorship of commercial cinema and developed a number of practices to advance their aesthetic autonomy. American artists working in the emerging expanded cinema embraced multimedia events in which different types of media converged, the exploration of new electronic technologies, and participatory events that changed the relationship between spectators and the artist.

The 1964 New York World's Fair, which featured several multiscreen cinematic works, was heralded as a watershed for multiscreen experimentation. Its exhibition of To Be Alive!, a three-screen film by Alexander Hammid and Francis Thompson, received considerable attention and garnered an Academy Award. However, the local underground film community viewed the embrace of maximalist spectacle with skepticism, organizing an Expanded Cinema Festival in 1965. American filmmaker Stan Vanderbeek had coined the term earlier that year, leveraging the idea of expanded consciousness in psychedelic culture, to describe works of underground cinema. Critic Gene Youngblood popularized the term in his 1970 book Expanded Cinema. Youngblood, who was interested in counterculture, viewed expanded cinema as "a process of becoming, man's ongoing historical drive to manifest his consciousness outside of his mind."

Expanded cinema manifested in Europe during the early 1970s. In the United Kingdom, its emergence was associated with structural/materialist filmmakers of London Film-Makers' Co-op and the Filmaktion collective. Unlike the American works, which combined cinema with other media, the British tendency used projectors, monitors, and film as signifiers themselves.

== Techniques ==
Live performances by Colectivo Crater, making use of a projector without film

Filmmakers may use more than one projector at a time, in some cases working with unique projection surfaces such as boxes, curved screens, or architectural features. Expanded cinema may include live elements of dance or theatre, often by filming a performance and establishing relationships between the recorded and live performances. Technological devices such as television, video, computers, color organs, or stroboscopes are used to create or modify images.

== Bibliography ==
- Chateau, Dominique (2020). "Art, Otherwise Than Art". In Chateau, Dominique; Moure, José (eds.). Post-Cinema: Cinema in the Post-Art Era. Amsterdam University Press. ISBN 978-94-6372-723-5.
- Rees, A. L.; White, Duncan; Ball, Steven; Curtis, David, eds. (2011). Expanded Cinema: Art, Performance, Film. Tate Publishing. ISBN 978-1-85437-974-0.
- Renan, Sheldon (1967). An Introduction to the American Underground Film. E. P. Dutton & Co. ISBN 978-0-525-47207-0.
- Uroskie, Andrew V. (2014). Between the Black Box and the White Cube: Expanded Cinema and Postwar Art. University of Chicago Press. ISBN 978-0-226-84299-8.
- Youngblood, Gene (1970). Expanded Cinema. E. P. Dutton. ISBN 978-0-525-10152-9.
