= ASE Group =

Taiwanese manufacturer of semiconductor testing products

Advanced Semiconductor Engineering, Inc.
- Type: Public
- Traded as: ASE Technology Holding Co., Limited; NYSE: ASX; TWSE: 3711
- Industry: Semiconductor assembly, testing & packaging
- Founded: 1984
- Founders: Jason Chang
- Headquarters: Kaohsiung, Taiwan
- Area served: Worldwide
- Revenue: US$8.72 billion (2015)
- Number of employees: 65,695
- Website: ase.aseglobal.com

Advanced Semiconductor Engineering, Inc. (Chinese: 日月光半導體製造股份有限公司), previously known as ASE Group (Chinese: 日月光集團), is a leading provider of independent semiconductor packaging and test manufacturing services, with its headquarters in Kaohsiung, Taiwan.

== Overview ==
The company was founded in 1984 by brothers Jason Chang and Richard Chang, who opened its first factory in Kaohsiung, Taiwan. Jason Chang currently serves as company chairman and is on the 2024 Forbes list of the world's billionaires.

As of 1 April 2025, the company's market cap was US$19.55 billion.

On 26 May 2016, ASE and Siliconware Precision Industries (SPIL) announced that they signed an agreement to form a new holding company, as part of the consolidation in the global semiconductor industry. Both companies said that each will retain its legal entities, management and staff, besides the current independent operations and operating models.

== Technology ==
According to the market research firm Gartner, ASE is the largest Outsourced Semiconductor Assembly and Test (OSAT) provider, with 19 percent market share. The company offers services such as semiconductor assembly, packaging and testing. ASE provides semiconductor assembly and testing services for over 90 percent of electronics companies in the world. The packaging services include fan-out wafer-level packaging (FO-WLP), wafer-level chip-scale packaging (WL-CSP), flip chip, 2.5D and 3D packaging, system in package (SiP) and copper wire bonding.

Fan-out wafer-level packaging (FO-WLP), a process that enables ultra-thin, high-density packages, has been around for several years, and the fan-out technology is becoming an industry trend due to increasing market demand for smaller and thinner mobile products. According to the research firm Yole Développement, the fan-out packaging market is predicted to reach $2.4 billion by 2020, increasing from $174 million in 2014.

Wafer-level chip-scale packaging (WL-CSP) is the technology that enables the smallest available packages in the market, meeting the increasing demand for smaller and faster portable consumer devices. This ultra-thin package type has integrated into mobile devices such as smartphones. In October 2001, ASE began volume production of wafer-level chip-scale packages.

Flip chip is a method of flipping the chip to connect with either substrate or leadframe. According to the research firm Yole Développement, the flip chip technology market value is expected to reach $25 billion in 2020. This market trend is mainly driven by mobile and wireless devices like tablets, computing applications such as servers, and consumer applications like smart TVs.

2.5D packaging can enable hundreds of thousands of interconnects within a small package space. This packaging technology is used in applications such as high memory bandwidth, network switches, router chips and graphics cards for the gaming market. Since 2007, ASE has been working with AMD to bring 2.5D packaging technology to market. The two companies collaborated on Fiji, a 2.5D-based GPU processor designed for extreme gamers, which is small enough to fit a 6-inch PCB and connects 240,000 bumps. In June 2015, Fiji was officially launched at the E3 gaming conference.

System in Package (SiP) is the technology for bundling multiple ICs to work together inside a single package. SiP technology is being driven by market application trends in wearables, mobile devices and Internet of Things (IoT). In 2004, ASE was one of the first companies to begin mass production of SiP technology. In April 2015, the company planned to double its SiP production capacity in the next 3 years.

== Facilities ==
The company's main operations are in Kaohsiung, Taiwan, with other plants located in China, South Korea, Japan, Malaysia and Singapore. It also has offices and service centers in China, South Korea, Japan, Singapore, Belgium and the United States.

On 1 October 2013, a water incident occurred at the ASE K7 facility. In February 2014, officials from the Kaohsiung City Government and the Kaohsiung Environmental Protection Bureau (EPB) visited the K7 factory to evaluate the resumption of operations at the facility. In December 2014, after checking the company's improvement on wastewater treatment, the EPB officials agreed to allow the K7 facility to resume operations.

From 2010 to 2013, ASE has invested US$13.2 million in treating industrial water. In addition, ASE invested $25.3 million to build a water recycling plant, K14 in Kaohsiung, Taiwan. The water recycling plant began trials in January 2015. With the first phase of the project now complete, the plant handles up to 20,000 metric tons of wastewater per day. Half of the water is recycled and returned to ASE's facilities for reuse; the other half is discharged into the city's drains. The effluent from the recycling plant not only conforms to local regulations, but the average concentration values are far less than the regulatory limit.

== See also ==
- List of companies of Taiwan
- TSMC (Taiwan Semiconductor Manufacturing Company)
- Semiconductor industry in Taiwan
- List of semiconductor fabrication plants
