= Pascal Dombis =

French digital artist

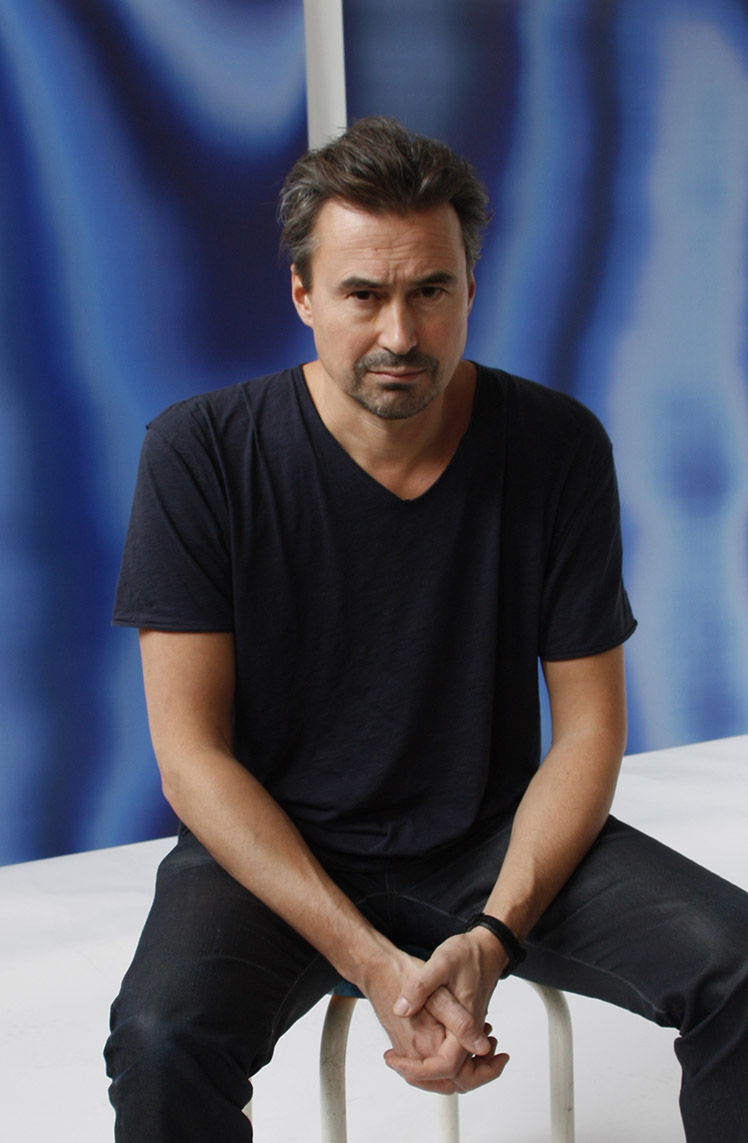
- Born: 1965 (age 60–61); Metz, France
- Known for: Digital art
- Awards: honorary mention at Ars Electronica 1993

Pascal Dombis (born 1965) is a French digital artist who uses computers and algorithms to produce excessive repetition of simple processes.

== Life and work ==
Born in Metz in 1965, Dombis earned an engineering degree from the Insa University in Lyon. In 1987, he spent one year at Tufts University where he attended computer art classes at Boston Museum School and began to use computers and algorithms in his art. From 1994 to 2000, he participated in the fractalist exhibitions that were curated by the art critics Susan Conde and Henri-François Debailleux that used fractal theory to project a new paradigm for art. The fractalist show gathered various artist under this concept, such as like Miguel Chevalier, Carlos Ginzburg, Jean-Claude Meynard (in French), Nabil Nahas and Joseph Nechvatal. In 1993, Dombis was awarded an honorary mention from Ars Electronica in Linz and in 2003 he received a Canon digital award.

Dombis is noted for his excessive use of simple algorithmic rules. When rules are input in an excessive process, new and unpredictable forms come to the fore and generate the unlikely; which is not dissimilar with the way the Surrealist exquisite corpse operated. Dombis initially worked with simplistic rules: drawing a straight line for instance. But then he used digital tools to reach the wildest proliferations possible. Visual forms appear (they are not intentionally programmed) out of the excessive enforcement of autonomous and simple rules. So Dombis does not consciously conceive a structure in advance. He lays down simple rules and lets them go through a series of interactions. Through this abuse of technological processes, Dombis tries to confront the human viewer with 'his/her' own forms of primitive irrationality.

Frank Popper wrote:

"It is interesting to note that Dombis sees his interactive computational methodology as a kind of arte povera within new technology. Certainly, Dombis uses the computer for its original and primitive essence: a powerful computational tool that can reproduce simple calculation incessantly. But because Dombis writes his own algorithms and programs, he can control his germinating art work. It helps him too in his creative process by exploring other computer language techniques and making programming mistakes that turn out to be new explorations in his geometric hyperstructures". .

Dombis's work has been shown in numerous exhibitions around the world and is part of several public and private collections. In 2005 Dombis started to work on spam proliferations and realized several installations at Château de Linardié in Senouillac. In collaboration with the London-based sound artist Thanos Chrysakis, he developed BLINK, an interactive digital video art installation based on the blinking experience. Blink was first displayed at the Slought Foundation in Philadelphia in 2006. Recent exhibitions include the digital art biennial of São Paulo where he realized a monumental outdoor digital print installation of 300 square meters. His work was included in the 2008 retrospective Imaging by numbers: a historical view of the computer print at the Mary and Leigh Block Museum of Art in Evanston, Illinois.

In 2010, Dombis realized Text(e)~Fil(e)s, a monumental 252 meter long floor ribbon commissioned by the French Ministry of Culture for the Palais-Royal in Paris. Composed of thousands of written text lines borrowed from various authors who have written on the Palais Royal, this temporary installation invited visitors to a stroll while reading a single text or experiencing a non-linear reading.

In 2013, Dombis participated in Noise, an official collateral show of the 55th Venice Biennale of Art, based on Joseph Nechvatal’s book Immersion Into Noise. He presented Post-Digital Mirror, a large lenticular piece that follows the observer’s movements and produces organic and irregular shapes and lines.

At the end of year 2015, Pascal Dombis, in collaboration with Gil Percal, installed in Perth, Western Australia, Irrational Geometrics, a monumental installation of digitally printed glass and LED lighting, bringing a European perceptive to the city landscape. In 2016, Pascal Dombis and Gil Percal created Ligne-Flux, a permanent glass public artwork that covers the entire under-face of a footbridge which links 2 buildings of the École nationale supérieure d'architecture in Strasbourg France. Ligne-Flux was commissioned by the French Ministry of Culture. Based on line-curve proliferation and random color, the artwork produces a vibrant visual effect as one walks under the bridge and offers another kind of mapping in which networks, connections and flows come into play.

Pascal Dombis lives and works in Paris.
