= Jason Chang =

Taiwanese-Singaporean businessman

- 張虔生
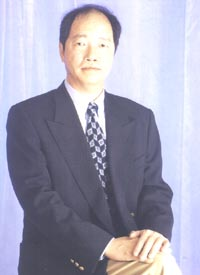
- Born: 18 January 1944 (age 82); Shanghai, China
- Citizenship: Singapore
- Education: National Taiwan University (BS); Illinois Institute of Technology (MS)
- Spouse: Ching Ping Chang
- Children: 3, including Rutherford

Jason Chang Chien-Sheng (Chinese: 張虔生; pinyin: Zhāng Qiánshēng; born 18 January 1944) is a Taiwanese-Singaporean billionaire business executive who is the chairman of Taiwan-based Advanced Semiconductor Engineering (ASE). On the Forbes 2024 list of the world's billionaires, he was ranked #417 with a net worth of US$6.6 billion.

In September 2015, Chang received a Semiconductor Equipment and Materials International SEMI Award, which recognized his "significant achievements in the development and commercialization of copper wire in the IC assembly process".

== Personal life ==
Jason Chang's hometown is Wenzhou. Chang has three children: Danielle, Rutherford, and Madeline, who pursued creative careers, inspired by their mother, Ching Ping Chang, an artistic interior designer.

== Recognition ==
In December 2013, Chang issued a public apology for water pollution caused by untreated wastewater issuing from an ASE plant in southern Taiwan, following a TW$600,000 (US$20,300) fine imposed earlier that month from Kaohsiung City Government.

Chang received honorary doctorates from National Sun Yat-sen University in Taiwan in November 2018, and National Cheng Kung University in Taiwan in July 2022.
