= Frank Popper =

French art historian (1918–2020)

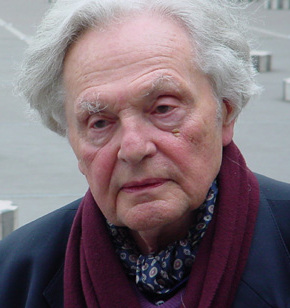
- Popper in 2006
- Born: 17 April 1918; Prague, Bohemia, Austria-Hungary
- Died: 12 July 2020 (aged 102); Lugano, Switzerland
- Education: Paris-Sorbonne University
- Known for: Historian of art and technology
- Awards: Legion of Honour
- Scientific career
- Fields: Aesthetics and the science of art

Frank Popper (17 April 1918 – 12 July 2020) was a Czech-born French-British historian of art and technology and professor emeritus of Aesthetics and the Science of Art at the University of Paris VIII. He was decorated with the medal of the Légion d'honneur by the French Government. He is author of the books Origins and Development of Kinetic Art, Art, Action, and Participation, Art of the Electronic Age and From Technological to Virtual Art.

Popper documented the historical record of the relationship between technology and participatory forms of art, especially between the late 1960s and the early 1990s.

== Kinetic Art and Op Art ==
In his books Origins and Development of Kinetic Art and Art, Action and Participation, Popper showed how Kinetic Art played an important part in pioneering the unambiguous use of optical movement and in fashioning links between science, technology, art and the environment. Popper was a champion of the humanizing effects of such an interdisciplinary synthesis.

Key to his initial thinking and activities as an aesthetician, cultural theorist, curator, teacher and art critic was his encounter in the early 1950s with the kinetic artist (and author of the book Constructivism) George Rickey. He subsequently encountered the artists Nicolas Schoffer and Frank Malina, whose works were based on first or second-hand scientific knowledge. Also Op Art in the early 1960s had a powerful effect on him. Indeed, Op Art proved to be a strong predecessor to what he was calling Virtual Art in that Op Art called attention to the spectator's individual, constructive, and changing perceptions - and thus called upon the spectator to transfer the creative act increasingly upon him or herself. Op beckons forth a consideration of the enlargement of the audience's participatory role; both in regard to the perception of meaning and actual physical changes to the work of art. Popper also had many personal encounters in Paris with Groupe de Recherche d’Art Visual, Carlos Cruz-Diez, Yaacov Agam, Jesus-Rafael Soto and Victor Vasarely, which proved to have had a substantial impact on his view of art and art history.

== Virtual art ==
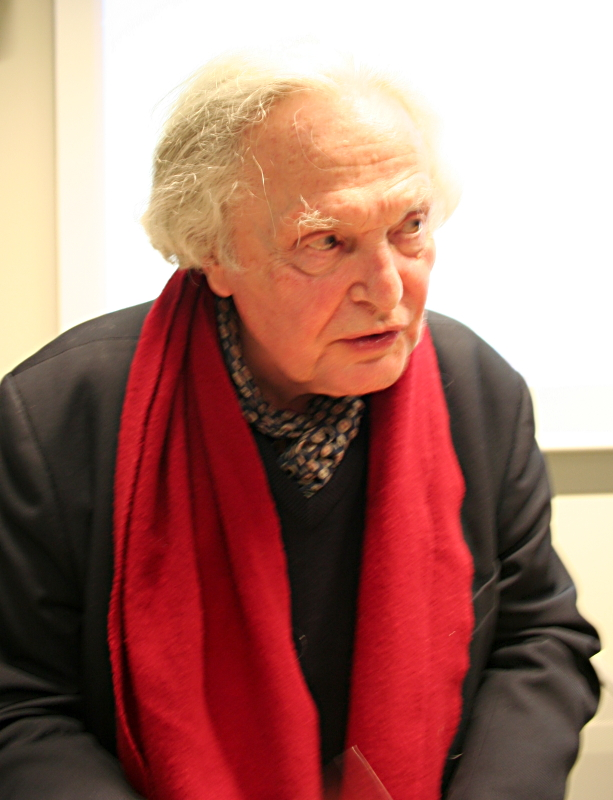
Popper in 2008

Following this inclination Popper took interest in the works of Piotr Kowalski, Roy Ascott and many others working with the early concept of networking. These artists confirmed his interest in spectator participation, which brought him to the late 1980s and the 1990s when immersive virtual reality and digital art began to become established. Popper began to investigate a range of works emerging in this era, including those of Shawn Brixey, Ebon Fisher, and Joseph Nechvatal. To explain and illustrate the emergence of a techno-aesthetic Popper stressed the panoramic and multi-generational reach of virtual art. As regards virtual art, openness is stressed both from the point of view of the artists and their creativity and from that of the follow-up users in their reciprocating thoughts and actions. This commitment to the teeming openness found in virtual art can be traced to the theories of Umberto Eco and other aestheticians. During his late career Eco expressed a consideration of the computer as a spiritual tool.

Popper used the term, virtual art, in reference to all the art made with the technical media developed at the end of the 1980s (or a bit before, in some cases). These include human-machine interfaces such as visualization casks, stereoscopic spectacles and screens, generators of three-dimensional sound, data gloves, data clothes, position sensors, tactile and power feed-back systems, etc. All these technologies allowed immersion into the image and interaction with it. The impression of reality felt under these conditions was not only provided by vision and hearing, but also by the other bodily senses. This multiple sensing was so intensely experienced at times, that Popper could speak of it as an immersive virtual reality (VR).

In his 2006 book From Technological to Virtual Art, Popper traced the development of immersive, interactive new media art from its historical antecedents through digital art, computer art, cybernetic art, multimedia and net art. Popper showed that contemporary virtual art is a further refinement of the technological art of the late twentieth century - and also a departure from it. What is new about this new media art, he argued, is its humanization of technology, its emphasis on interactivity, its philosophical investigation of the real and the virtual, and its multisensory nature. He argued further that what distinguishes the artists who practice virtual art from traditional artists is their combined commitment to aesthetics and technology. Their "extra-artistic" goals - linked to their aesthetic intentions - concern not only science and society but also basic human needs and drives.

== Definition ==
Defining virtual art broadly as art that allows us, through an interface with technology, to immerse ourselves in computer art and interact with it, Popper identified an aesthetic-technological logic of creation that allows artistic expression through integration with technology. After describing artistic forerunners of virtual art from 1918 to 1983 - including art that used light, movement, and electronics - Popper looked at contemporary new media art forms and artists. He surveyed works that are digital based but materialized, multimedia offline works, interactive digital installations, and multimedia online works (net art) by many artists.

Virtual art, he argued, offers a new model for thinking about humanist values in a technological age. Virtual art, as Popper saw it, is more than just an injection of the usual aesthetic material into a new medium, but a deep investigation into the ontological, psychological and ecological significance of such technologies. The aesthetic-technological relationship produces an unprecedented artform.

Sharing Popper's focus on art and technology are Jack Burnham (Beyond Modern Sculpture 1968) and Gene Youngblood (Expanded Cinema 1970). They show how art has become, in Popper's terms, virtualized.

== Works ==
- Origins and Development of Kinetic Art, New York Graphic Society/Studio Vista, 1968
- Kinetics, Arts Council of Great Britain, 1970
- Art—Action and Participation, New York University Press, 1975
- (in German) Die kinetische Kunst: Licht und Bewegung, Umweltkunst und Aktion, DuMont Schauberg, 1975
- (in French) Le déclin de l'objet, Le Chêne, 1975
- (in French) Art, action et participation: L'artiste et la creativité aujourd'hui, Klincksieck, 1980
- (in Spanish) Arte, Acción Y Participación: El Artista Y La Creatividad De Hoy, Akal Ediciones, 1989
- Agam, Harry N. Abrams, 1990
- Art of the Electronic Age, Thames & Hudson, 1997
- (in French) Reflexions sur l'exil, l'art et l'Europe: Entretiens avec Aline Dallier, Klincksieck, 1998
- From Technological to Virtual Art, Leonardo Books, MIT Press, 2006
- (in French) Écrire sur l'art : De l'art optique a l'art virtuel, L'Harmattan, 2007
- Yvaral (with Britta Vetter & Emma Healey), Robert Sandelson Ltd., 2007
