= Robert C. Morgan =

American poet (1943–2024)

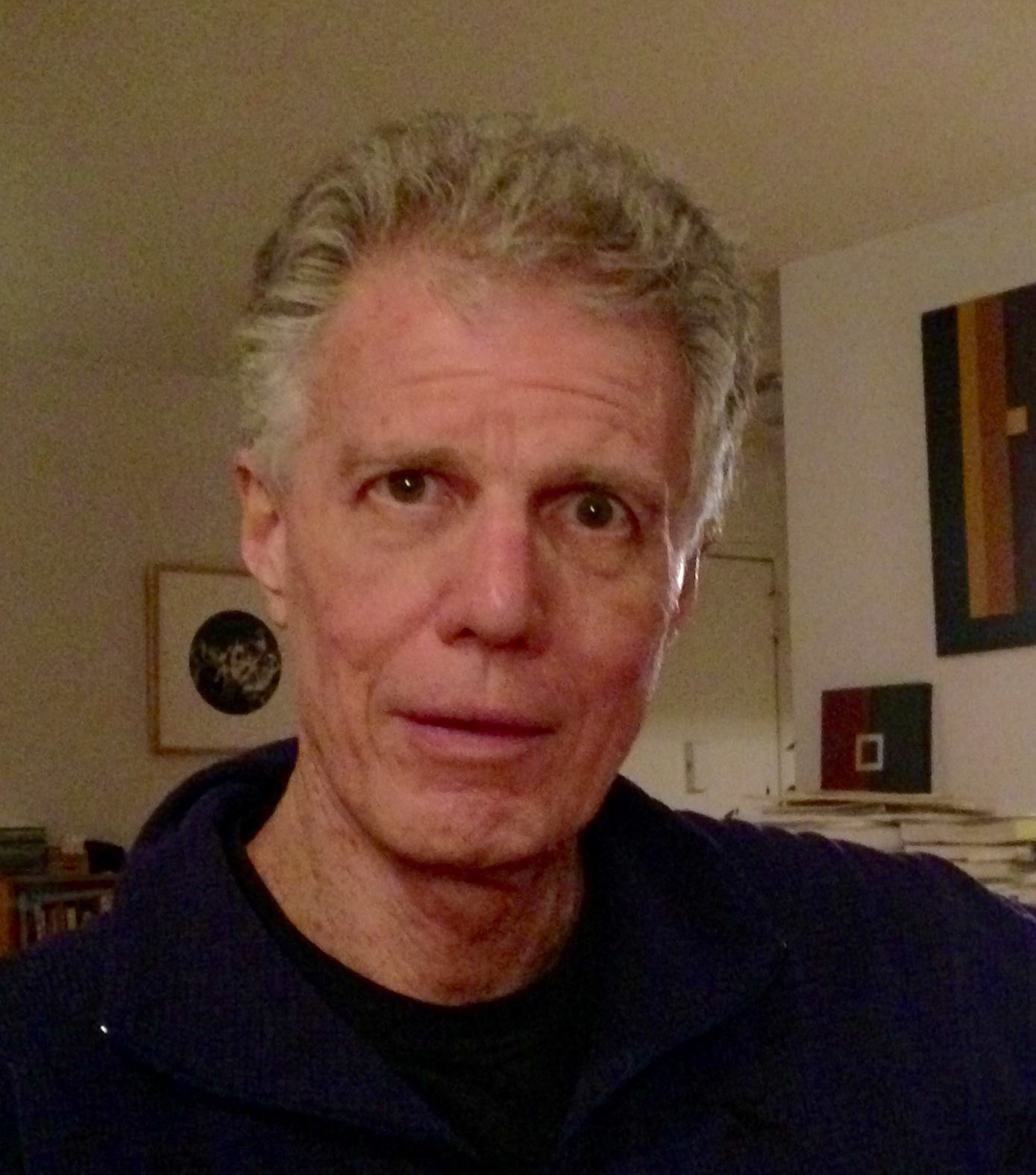
Morgan in 2014

Robert C. Morgan (1943 – October 23, 2024) was an American art critic, art historian, curator, poet, and visual artist.

== Life and career ==
Robert C. Morgan received his M.F.A. in sculpture from the University of Massachusetts, Amherst in 1975 and his Ph.D. in art education from New York University in 1978. Morgan had an extensive academic career, teaching at New York University, Wichita State University, the University of Rochester, the School of Visual Arts, Barnard College, and Columbia University. From 1981- 2001, he was Professor of the History and Theory of Art at the Rochester Institute of Technology. He was an adjunct professor of Fine Arts in the Graduate School of Fine Arts at Pratt Institute in Brooklyn, New York.

Morgan worked extensively as an independent curator. He organized museum retrospectives of Allan Kaprow (1979) and Komar and Melamid (1980), both at the Ulrich Museum of Art in Kansas. In 1990, he curated Concept -- Decoratif in conjunction with the Holly Solomon Gallery in New York. From 1989 to 1990, he directed the Nahan gallery in SoHo in New York City, where he curated a dozen exhibitions of both emerging and established artists, including Carolee Schneemann, Nancy Grossman, Hung Liu, Hong-Wen Lin, Robert Barry, Douglas Huebler, Mel Bochner, Antoni Muntadas, and Max Ernst. In 1994, he co-organized the exhibition Logo Non Logo with French critic Pierre Restany at the Thread Waxing Space in New York, which later traveled to the Art Museum of the University of South Florida in Tampa, Florida.

Morgan authored numerous books, catalogs and monographs on contemporary artists in various countries. His book on the American conceptualist Robert Barry was published by Karl Kerber Press in Bielefeld, Germany (1986). Haim Steinbach was published by the Musee d’Art Contemporain, Bordeaux (1988). Duchamp, Androgyny, Etc., (on Marcel Duchamp) was published by Editions Antoine Candau in Paris (1990). A Hans Bellmer Miscellany was published by Baum/Malmburg in Malmö, Sweden in 1993. His Turkish Bath installation at Artists Space in 1976 has been recognized an early example of post-conceptual art.

Morgan frequently wrote art criticism for the Brooklyn Rail. His books and collected critical essays published include commentaries on conceptual art, post-conceptual art, and the new media arts (Umbrella Associates, 1992). He published the following books in the United States: After the Deluge: Essays on the Art of the Nineties, (Red Bass Publications, 1993), Conceptual Art: An American Perspective (McFarland, 1994); Art into Ideas: Essays on Conceptual Art (Cambridge University Press, 1996), Between Modernism and Conceptual Art (McFarland, 1997): and The End of the Art World (Allworth Press, 1998).

His critical anthologies on Gary Hill (2000) and Bruce Nauman (2002) were published by Johns Hopkins University Press. An edited volume of the late writings by the critic Clement Greenberg was published by the University of Minnesota Press in 2003. In 1995, he traveled to Korea on a Fulbright Fellowship.

Morgan died from amyloidosis on October 23, 2024, at the age of 81.

== Books ==
- Duchamp, Androgyny, Etc., Editions Antoine Candau, Paris 1990
- Commentaries on the New Media Arts Pasadena, CA: Umbrella Associates, 1992
- After the Deluge: Essays for Art in the Nineties. New York: Red Bass, 1993
- Conceptual Art: An American Perspective. Jefferson, NC and London: McFarland, 1994. Introduction by Michael Kirby
- Art Into Ideas: Essays on Conceptual Art. London:Cambridge University Press, 1996
- Between Modernism and Conceptual Art. Jefferson, North Carolina and London: McFarland, 1997
- The End of the Art World New York: Allworth Press (in collaboration with the School of Visual Arts), 1998. Introduction by Bill Beckley
- The enigmatic world of Dmitri Strizhov. Author. Global Curiosity, 1st edition. 1998
- Gary Hill, editor. Johns Hopkins University Press, 2000
- Bruce Nauman, editor. Johns Hopkins University Press, 2002
- Clement Greenberg: Late Writings, editor. University of Minnesota Press. 2003
- Vasarely. New York: George Braziller, 2004
- Wild Dogs in Bali: The Art of Made Wianta. Singapore: SNP Editions, 2005

Anthologies and monographs

- "Asparagus and Chrysanthemums = Sentimentality and Power," in Muntadas and D'Agostino, eds., The Un/Necessary Image, New York: Tanam Press and Cambridge, Committee on the Visual Arts, MIT, 1983
- "The Delta of Modernism" Re-Dact, Edited by Peter Frank. New York: Willis, Locker, and Owens, 1984. Revised and reprinted in Kostelanetz, ed., Esthetics Contemporary, 2nd Edition, (Buffalo, New York: Prometheus Books, 1989 ( Spanish Translation appeared in Revista Esthetica (CAYC, Buenos Aires), Fall 1991. Revised in The End of the Art World, New York: Allworth Press, 1998.
- "Systemic Books by Artists" in Joan Lyons, ed., Artists' Books: A Critical Anthology and Sourcebook, Peregrine Smith Books and Visual Studies Workshop Press, Rochester, N.Y., 1985.
- Haim Steinbach: Monograph of an Exhibition, Bordeaux: capc Musee d'art contemporain, 1990 (French)
- Joseph Nechvatal: Laminations of the Soul in Joseph Nechvatal. Paris: Antoine Candau Editions, 1990 (English and French) (Online)
- "La Situacion del Arte Conceptual Desde "January Show" Hasta Nuestros Dias" in Juan Vicente Aliaga and José Miguel G. Cortés, editors, Arte Conceptual Revisado, Universidad Poletechnica de Valencia, 1990 (Spanish and English)
- "Entretien avec Robert C. Morgan" en Richard Serra: Ecrits et Entretiens, 1970-89 (Daniel Lelong Editeur, 1990). English Edition, Chicago University Press, 1993
- Colin Naylor, ed .Contemporary Masterworks (London: St. James Press, 1992) Entries include critical discussions of works by Isamu Noguchi, Gordon Bunschaft, and Josep Renau.
- Oscar de Mejo:The Naive Surrealist, Essay by Robert C. Morgan. New York: Abrams, 1992
- Marcel Delmotte. Essay by Robert C. Morgan. Nahan Galleries (in collaboration with Galerie Isy Brachot, Brussels), 1991
- "The Miralda Honeymoon Celebration in Las Vegas", Nevada State Council on the Arts, 1992
- "Hans Bellmer:The Infestation of Eros" in A Hans Bellmer Miscellany, Anders Malmburg, Malmö and Timothy Baum, New York, 1993
- "Dorothea Tanning's Sculptural Interlude" in Dorothea Tanning (New York: George Braziller, 1995)
- "Philip Glass: The Photographer" (1984, revised 1996), Writings on Glass: Essays, Interviews, Criticism. Edited by Richard Kostelanetz and Robert Flemming. (New York: Schirmer Books, 1997)
- "The Language of Eros" in Noritoshi Hirakawa, Matters, 1988–1997. New York: Deitch Projects and Antwerp: Zeno X Gallery, 1998
- "A Sign of Beauty" in Bill Beckley and David Shapiro, Uncontrollable Beauty. New York: Allworth Press, 1998.
- "Touch Sanitation: Mierle Laderman Ukeles" in Linda Frye Burnham and Steven Durland, editors. The Citizen Artist: 20 Years of Art in the Public Arena. Critical Press. The Gunk Foundation, 1998
- "The End of the Art World" (excerpt) in Patricia Hills, Modern Art in the USA: Issues and Controversies of the 20th Centuries" Upper Saddle River, New Jersey: Prentice Hall, 2000

== Film appearance ==
- Ciria, (Pronounced Thiria) (2013), directed by Artur Balder

== See also ==
- Conceptual art
- Post-conceptual art
- Institutional Critique
- Postmodern art
- Computer art
- Electronic art
- Systems art
- New media art
- Generative art
