= Siliconware Precision Industries =

Semiconductor company

Siliconware Precision Industries Co., Ltd.
- Type: Subsidiary
- Founded: 1984; 42 years ago
- Headquarters: Taichung, Taiwan
- Key people: Bough Lin (chairman and director); Chi-Wen Tsai (CEO, president); Eva Chen (CFO) (Dec 31, 2003)
- Products: Semiconductor packaging and testing
- Revenue: $368.73M (Dec 31, 2013)
- Parent: ASE Group
- Website: spil.com.tw

Siliconware Precision Industries Co., Ltd. is a publicly traded company founded in 1984 and based in Taichung, Taiwan. The company focuses on semiconductor packaging and testing services for PC, communications, consumer integrated circuits markets. These services are provided to protect semiconductor chips, better integrating into electronic systems, and improving the dissipation of heat. In 2016 SPIL and longtime competitor ASE Technology announced that they would merge, both being under the holding company ASE Group. The merger under the new holding company was completed and listed on the Taiwanese and American stock exchanges in 2018.

== History ==
Siliconware Precision Industries was founded in 1984. In 2000 the company became a public company in NASDAQ and in the same year, SPIL merged with Siliconware Corporation. The company acquired the common shares of ChipMOS Technologies LTD. in 2007, Taiwan Occupational Safety and Health Management in 2008, and merged with Siliconware Investment Company Ltd. in the next year of 2009.

In 2013, the company and Siliconware USA, Inc. settled the long patent infringement litigation with Tessera Technologies, Inc. Siliconware would pay Tessera, Inc. a partial upfront fee and smaller quarterly payments over the next five years, for being released from the litigation.

== Products and services ==
The packaging materials the company processed include substrate (ball grid array) and lead-frame packages, the testing services provided by the company are based on logic, mixed-signal, and embedded memory devices to measure the performance and reliability of packaged semiconductor devices. In addition, the company also provides turnkey service, shipment service, and other related services, such as wafer probing, tape and reel services.

Products of the company are under ISO 9001 certification, QS 9000 certification, ISO 14001 EMS International Certification, TS16949 certification, OHSAS 18001 Certification, IECQ HSPM certification, ISO 14064-1 verification, PAS 2050 verification.

The company competes with Amkor Technology, and STATS ChipPAC.

== Awards ==
- Winner of Award for International Trade of MOEA from 2008 to 2012.
- Won the Authorized Economic Operator by Ministry of Finance in 2012.
