= Ebon Fisher =

American artist, theater director, and media theorist

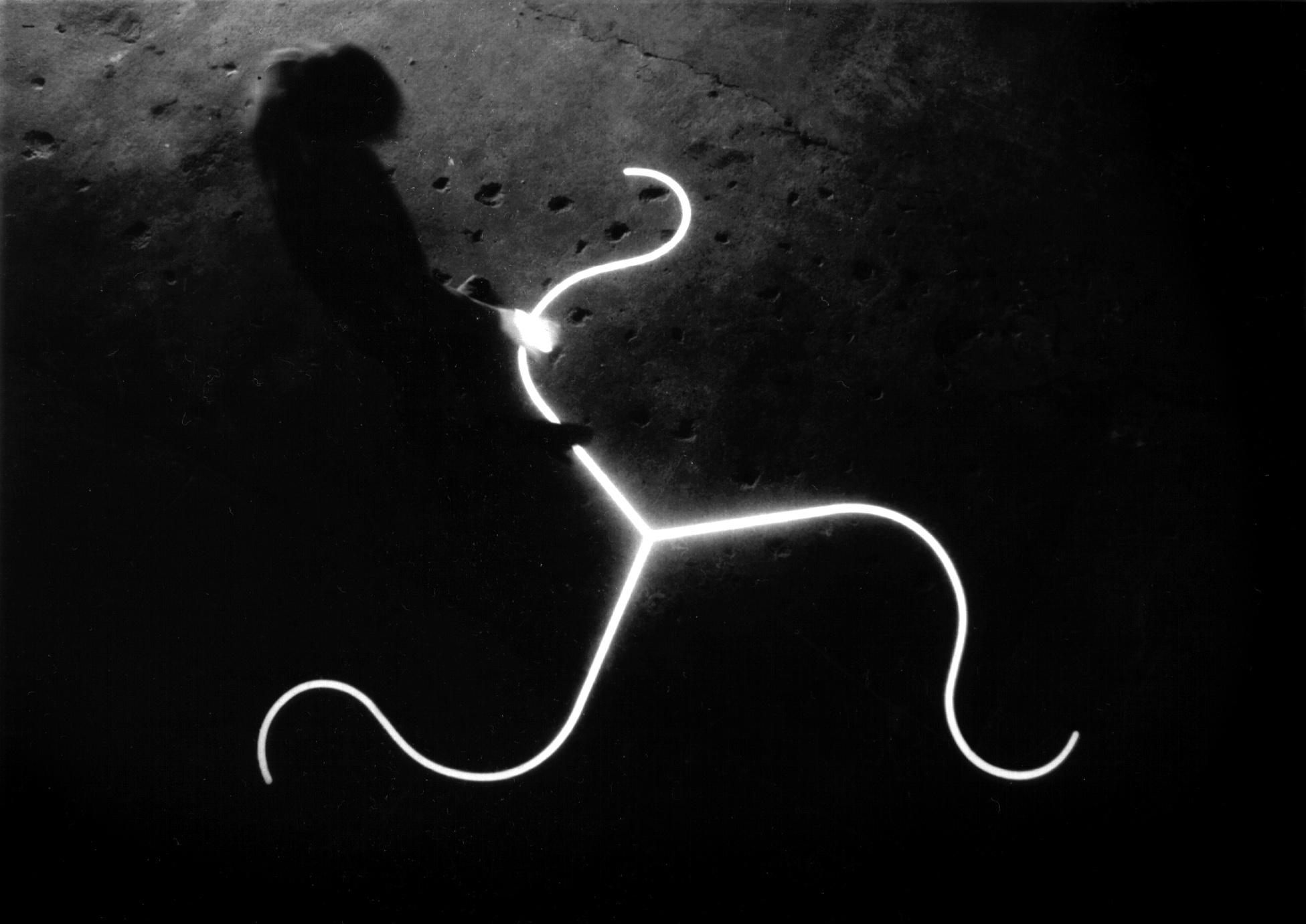
Three-Prong Media Organism: This was one of 14 interactive systems created by Ebon Fisher that were triggered by pedestrians at Test-Site Gallery in Williamsburg, Brooklyn, 1992. Viewers were invited to become “hosts,” disseminating the code as a primitive life form. An evolving set of these of “Bionic Codes” led Wired Magazine to title Fisher “Mr. Meme” in 1995.

Ebon Fisher is a media artist whose works have explored the relationships between the public and the living information systems that emerge in both urban and rural ecosystems. Much of his early work in this area involved live information sharing rituals at the Massachusetts Institute of Technology, Boston nightclubs, and in Williamsburg, Brooklyn, where Fisher’s immersive theater company, Nerve Circle helped to transform that once economically distressed district. In 1993, the largest of Fisher's immersive systems in Brooklyn featured 120 artists and musicians and included over 2,000 guests dancing in an abandoned mustard factory for 9 hours. That event, called Organism, involved an unscripted layering of performance, music, sculpture, dance, and living systems that Fisher described as a “web jam.” The all night event has been cited as a "symbolic climax" to Williamsburg's emerging renaissance by Domus Magazine, and described in the Performing Arts Journal (PAJ) as “an organic, interactive, web-like model of artistic production.” Organism was also discussed in Die Zeit and Newsweek, and featured in a timeline of the district’s transformation by the New York Times in 2024.

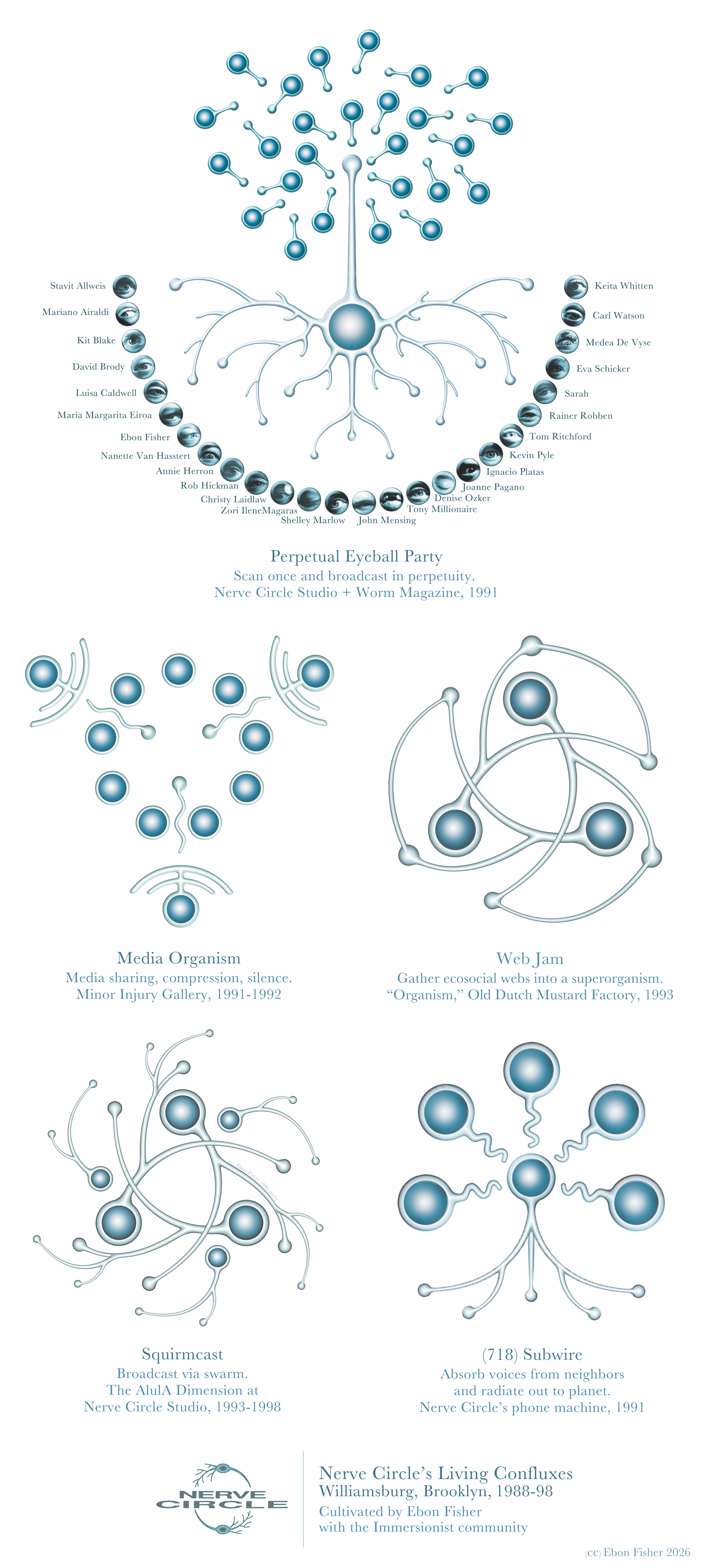

Fisher’s diagrams of his immersive events, and his network ethics symbols, the "Bionic Codes,” that emerged from those systems, were carried forward into the early web. The Encyclopædia Britannica featured Fisher’s website as one of “The Web’s Best Sites” in 1994 at Brittanica.com and his Bionic Codes were presented from 1996 to 2006 in the Guggenheim Museum’s online CyberAtlas which curator Laura Trippi described in the Guggenheim Magazine as “the first concerted effort to chart the cultural terrain known as cyberspace.” Fisher’s live, immersive media rituals, and his approach to culture as a "subjective ecosystem", came to fruition in the 1990s at a time when both digital media and the study of human ecology began to emerge in the academic discourse. According to the arts historian, Cisco Bradley, Fisher’s manifesto from 1988, You Sub Mod, introduced a philosophy of environmental entanglement which helped to lay the philosophical foundation to Brooklyn Immersionism in the 1990s. “In many ways,” Bradley writes, “Immersionism was the next stage of evolution of the New York art scene.” In his book, The Williamsburg Avant Garde: Experimental Music and Sound on the Brooklyn Waterfront, Bradley quotes from Fisher's You Sub Mod:

“Some theorists have characterized the period as one of immersionism, a kind of total artwork… As Ebon Fisher stated in 1988, in reference to the first use of the term: ‘You are the SUB MODERN. You live in a million tribes and burrows beneath the illusion we call the real world. While the Party passes over your heads you see its abject nakedness. You never believed in modernism and you aren’t fooled by its vain reflection, postmodernism… Without proclamation you have integrated yourself into the endless unfolding of spectacles. You found that to immerse yourself was the thing, sensing that objectivity was only another dream.’”

== From art to living systems ==
=== Cultivating media organisms ===
Ebon Fisher's ecological approach to culture in Brooklyn was set against the backdrop of mid 20th century existentialism, an individualistic and human-centric philosophy, and the distancing aesthetics of postmodernism which was still popular in Manhattan throughout the 1980s. The French art historian, Frank Popper, has stated in the book, Contemporary Artists, that Fisher's goal was to create neither art nor science, but to cultivate "the living properties of information." Citing a body of work spanning street graffiti, immersive rock performance, information sharing theater and viral network ethics, Popper states:

“[Fisher’s creations] can be seen as an effort at moving our collective gaze away from both art and science and towards the nurturing of ‘life’ in the broadest, non-objective, and non-human sense. It is an attempt to seed a form of ‘subjective ecology.’ This leads, among other things, to a de-centered authorship where one creates with the community, with the medium, and with nature.”

Fisher's experimental theater company, Nerve Circle, cultivated what Fisher called "media organisms.” These were a series of living information sharing systems that helped to build a creative community and eventually revitalize a distressed industrial area of Williamsburg, Brooklyn in the 1990s. Fisher and other Immersionists eventually catalyzed a renaissance that spread through much of Brooklyn. In 2024, The New York Times included Organism among the immersive events that established Brooklyn as “Where It's At” in New York's cultural life. Earlier, in Domus Magazine, Suzan Wines described that all night, weblike system as a “symbolic climax” to Williamsburg’s creative emergence:

"Conceived by Ebon Fisher, Organism became a kind of symbolic climax to the renegade activity that had been stirring within the community since the late eighties. It exploited the notion of architecture as living event, breathing and transforming for fifteen hours in an abandoned mustard factory."

Fisher called his immersive systems company Nerve Circle to draw attention to the living social nervous system it was intended to help cultivate. In his introduction to a museum exhibition at the University of Illinois in 1993, the art historian, Jonathan Fineberg spoke of Fisher’s commitment to abandon the rubric of high art built within a narrow academic discourse, and to create collaboratively with his Brooklyn neighborhood:

"After twenty-five years of a language-based focus to the art world – hand in hand with the demise of confidence in the ability of 'vanguard' artists to affect culture by showing radical work in SoHo galleries (much less ones in Kreuzberg or the Marais) – many artists today are returning to immediate experience, to the body, and to a neighborhood cultural interaction. As Ebon Fisher, a key figure on the Williamsburg scene recently told me, 'we're not making art out here, we're creating culture.'"

=== Living systems at the MIT Media Lab ===
While still a graduate student at the Massachusetts Institute of Technology, Ebon Fisher was appointed by Professor Muriel Cooper to teach an immersive media course, Creative Seeing to undergraduates at the MIT Media Lab at its inception in 1985. Running for two years, Fisher's course helped to establish the Media Lab as a think tank that explored new approaches to media, information and living systems. Moving beyond Marshall McLuhan's definition of media as an extension of the human being, and beyond technological consumerism, Fisher presented the arts and media as an equal relationship between humans and their environment. He invited students to join him in public media experiments in the streets of Cambridge; to analyze television on the top of the tallest building on campus; and to experience total sensory deprivation inside MIT’s anechoic chamber. Drawing from these experiences, Fisher began to formulate an immersive rock theater company, Nerve Circle in 1986 that introduced biological systems and themes into public spaces. After performances at MIT's Center for Advanced Visual Studies, Harvard’s Carpenter Center for the Arts, Boston rock clubs and the Institute of Contemporary Art, three Boston police officers shut down a performance of Nerve Circle’s “Evolution of the Grid” at a party in Fisher's studio. The intrusion led to an eviction from Fisher’s loft near Boston’s Fort Point Channel, convincing Fisher to move to Brooklyn where his experimental nature might be more fully embraced.

=== Brooklyn ===
In 1988, two years after receiving a Master of Science from MIT’s Center for Advanced Visual Studies, Fisher moved to Williamsburg, Brooklyn where he became part of the Brooklyn Immersionists arts movement. That movement created art with a focus on environment in Williamsburg's then-rundown waterfront area. Fisher and his colleagues in the Immersionist movement focused on ecologicy and neighborhood participation in local zines like Waterfront Week and Worm Magazine, among others.

As a featured artist at Williamsburg's Test-Site Gallery, Fisher started a media store in the entrance, and launched public events like The Salon of the Mating Spiders, which showcased 600 local artists. For the event, Fisher did not impose restrictions on size and medium. The gallery director, Annie Herron said in Flash Art that “At first I thought it was crazy,” but then said that the Salon of the Mating Spiders had become her best-selling show with six hundred artists lined up around the block to install work of every kind in every conceivable space.

Coming of age in a postmodern era that questioned human objectivity and industrial progress, Ebon Fisher and his colleagues in Williamsburg transitioned to a post-postmodern cultural paradigm that emphasized environmental immersion, organic vitality, and a departure from 20th century individualism that led to what Fisher called “subjective ecology” in the British journal, Digital Creativity in 1998. In the 1990s, Fisher and his interdisciplinary colleagues played a role in transforming Brooklyn's depressed industrial waterfront and helped to catalyze a renaissance in Williamsburg. In the 2000s, corporate welfare policies led to a rise in the cost of living and a shift to a more alienated, and less immersive, corporate culture in the area.

=== Advancing art and urban ecology ===
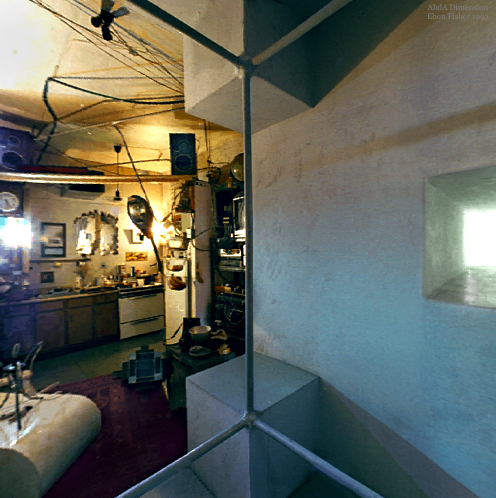
The AlulA Dimension: Ebon Fisher built this structure in his loft on Wythe Avenue in Williamsburg, Brooklyn in 1994. The climbable structure hosted both online and physical events, acting as a portal to the early internet.

At the turn of the 21st century, Ebon Fisher’s immersive systems reflected several emerging cultural paradigms, including nascent urban ecology movements in Brooklyn, and a very young and experimental digital culture. In the 2000 edition of his book, Art Since 1940: Strategies of Being, Jonathan Fineberg elaborates on Fisher’s interdisciplinary range:

“The artist Ebon Fisher inhabited the close-knit artists’ neighborhood that existed in Williamsburg, Brooklyn at the start of the nineties. His work involved the interface of media, technology, and industry with the human environment of a small community... ‘The web,’ he said, 'has created the new Vienna.’ ...Fisher also began making digital art that had no fixed materiality; instead it had the flavor of contemporary Cyberpunk fiction, as in William Gibson’s 1984 novel Neuromancer... Fisher wrote utopian “social programs” on the computer [and] through community-based cultural enterprises and consumer technology, he aspired to reclaim the production of culture from the mass marketers.”

As an artist, Fisher took a creative approach to such systems thinking, earning the attention of a wide range of media, including Fuji Television, Yale Radio, Newsweek, Die Zeit, Wired, Flash Art, and The New York Times. Fisher’s media rituals and Bionic Codes were presented in two New York Magazine cover stories, "The New Bohemia" on Williamsburg (1992), and "The New York Cyber-Sixty” on New York digital innovators (1995). French art historian, Frank Popper describes Fisher’s Bionic Codes in his book, From Technological to Virtual Art (MIT Press, 2007), as "artificial lifeforms cultivated in the plasma of popular culture." Popper also underscores the organic vitality driving Nerve Circle's immersive creations beginning in Cambridge and Boston in the 1980s:

"These rituals focused on the immediacy of body-experience and on community-based culture, as Fisher organized massive participatory art events in gyms, nightclubs and neighborhoods. They were also efforts at exploring new ways to build vital convergences of humans and media technology."

In the foreword to a retrospective of Fisher’s work in 2006, media theorist Douglas Rushkoff underscored Fisher’s biological approach to culture:

“It's not enough to come up with a great idea, or even the solution to one of the world's great problems… For what if the person you truly need to hear your message doesn't speak your language, refuses to see through your cultural bias, or hasn't even been born yet? How can one communicate across these chasms? The work in your hands is just such an artifact. Ebon Fisher's expressions are at once an immediately hypnotic viral challenge, and an advanced set of social protocols for evolving into a more inclusive and collaborative cultural organism.”

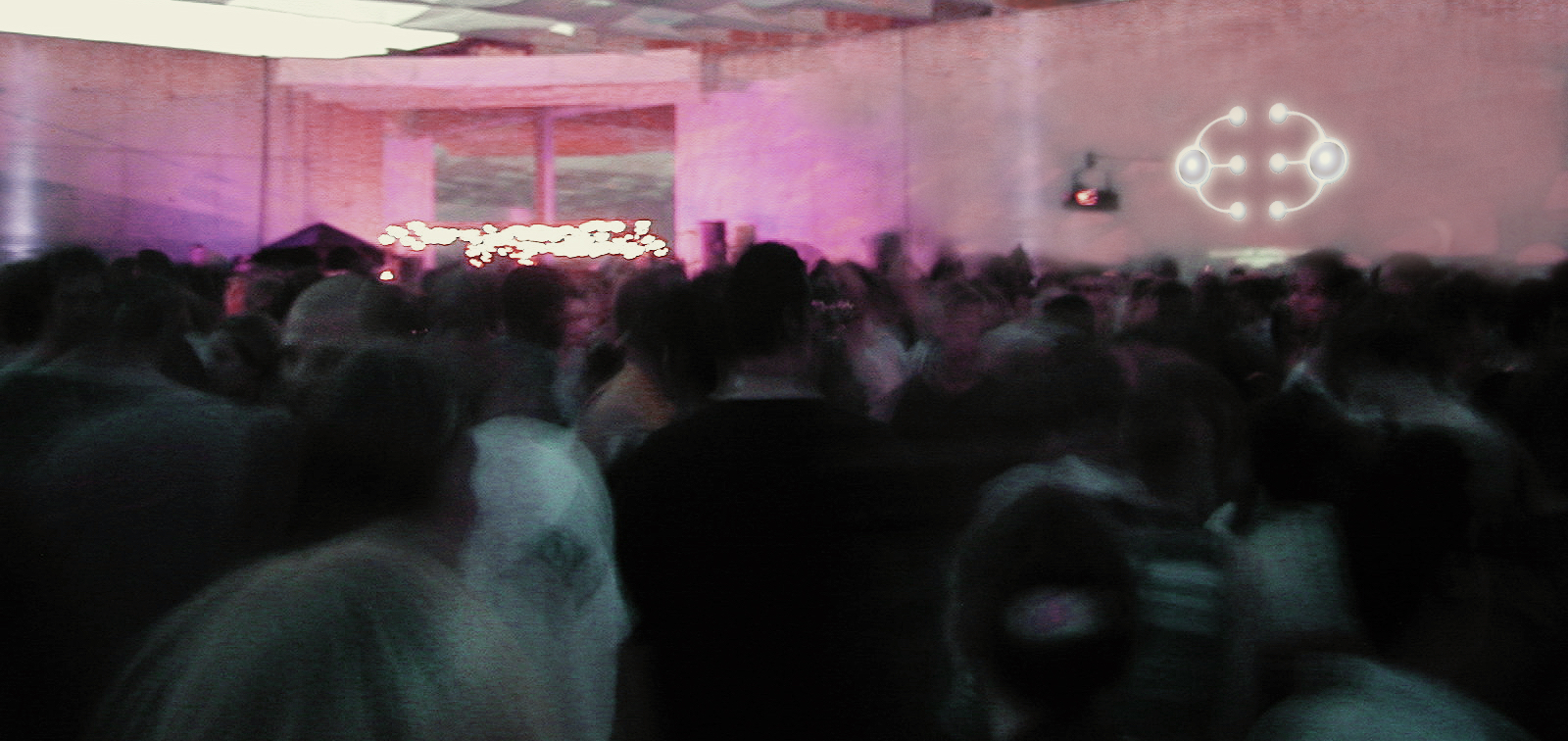
Equalize Seduction: a Bionic Code by Ebon Fisher is projected at MoMA-PS1 in 2000. Fisher’s Bionic Codes eventually evolved into Zoacodes and are being integrated into a multimedia world called Zoapool.

Recognizing the artist’s "subversive play” in the spaces between culture, nature and technology, Wired Magazine covered Fisher’s works five times, beginning in 1995 with an article titled “Mr. Meme.” The artist’s diagrams of living media systems have appeared in numerous 20th century survey exhibitions, including the Cooper Hewitt, and the Musée d'Art Contemporain de Montréal. He’s directed performances at Boston’s Institute for Contemporary Art, The Carpenter Center for the Performing Arts at Harvard, and broadcast a live production of "The AlulA Dimension" from his Williamsburg studio to MIT’s List Visual Arts Center via a project called Port. In 1997 Elliott Sharp included Fisher’s music in his anthology, State of the Union, along with two other prominent Williamsburg artist-musicians, Greg Asch (DJ Olive) and Karthik Swaminathan (Kit Krash). Included with other cultural pioneers, Mark Pauline, Jaron Lanier and Douglas Rushkoff, Fisher has been lauded as one of the "Visionaries of the New Millennium" by David Pescovitz in Java Magazine.

=== Neurons and Networks ===
A common element in all of Ebon Fisher's work has been an effort to reveal the living networks we are immersed in. Fisher began to develop his nerve-like visual language in Pittsburgh while he was an art student at Carnegie-Mellon University. In 1981 he spray-painted a series of neurons along the train tracks in Pittsburgh's Panther Hollow, and was eventually introduced to another Pennsylvania graffiti artist, Keith Haring, by one of his painting professors, Jim Denny. Rather than follow Haring to the world of New York galleries, Fisher began to take courses in computer programming which the young artist believed was extending the human nervous system into a mesh of machines. Using the programming language, Pascal, Fisher wrote the program, Book.dat, that generated random fields of zeros. A primitive harbinger of generative AI, the program was capable of producing an infinite number of images and text. Book.dat opened the door to graduate studies at MIT and Fisher was invited to teach at the institute's Media Lab at its inception. Informed by his exposure to cybernetics and feedback systems at the MIT Media Lab in the mid-1980s, Fisher continued to approach his work as a collaboration with the world to cultivate nervelike systems.

- Neuron graffiti: Pittsburgh, PA (1980–82).
- Nerve Circle (phase 1): Interactive rock theatre born during studies and teaching at MIT (1984–88).
- Nerve Circle (phase 2): Community-based information-sharing rituals in Williamsburg, Brooklyn (1988–98).
- Network ethics: Bionic ethics system, the Bionic Codes, which evolved into Zoacodes (1992-present).
- The Nervepool: An evolving transmedia world that began in Brooklyn as The AlulA Dimension and evolved into the Nervepool.
- Zoapool: A new iteration of the Nervepool, Zoapool, has begun to move from the specificity of networks to a pool of living interactions called Zoapool (1992-present).

=== Embodied network architecture ===
In the mid-1990s, Ebon Fisher built an immersive architectural system into his loft called The AlulA Dimension. It acted as a three dimensional expression of a node in Fisher’s nervelike system of ethics, the Bionic Codes. In 1998, Suzan Wines discussed the weblike nature of the climbable structure which Fisher used as a site for fully embodied media events or “squirmcasts."

"As a 'living media organism' the AlulA Dimension has a completely symbiotic relationship with its environment and inhabitants. Inspired by similarities between the flexible structures of ecological systems and the internet, Ebon Fisher began breeding the AlulA Dimension as an "organic matrix" for social interaction."

Among the guests to Fisher’s squirmcasts in the AlulA Dimension was the team behind the San Francisco online chat group, Bianca’s Smutshack, and members of Williamsburg’s experimental night space and theater scene, Lalalandia and Fake Shop. MIT's List Visual Arts Center hosted a live broadcast of AlulA, along with another Williamsburg group, Floating Point Unit, as part of an international web broadcasting experiment called Port. Over the years since, Fisher developed AlulA and the Bionic Codes into more biomorphic structures which were rendered in both physical and digital media. The new incarnations went by the names, Nervepool and the Zoacodes. Both codes and architecture are now evolving again into a film and a weblike transmedia world called Zoapool which Fisher is cultivating in the Pinelands National Reserve of New Jersey.

== Philosophy and teaching ==
=== Scholarly endeavors ===
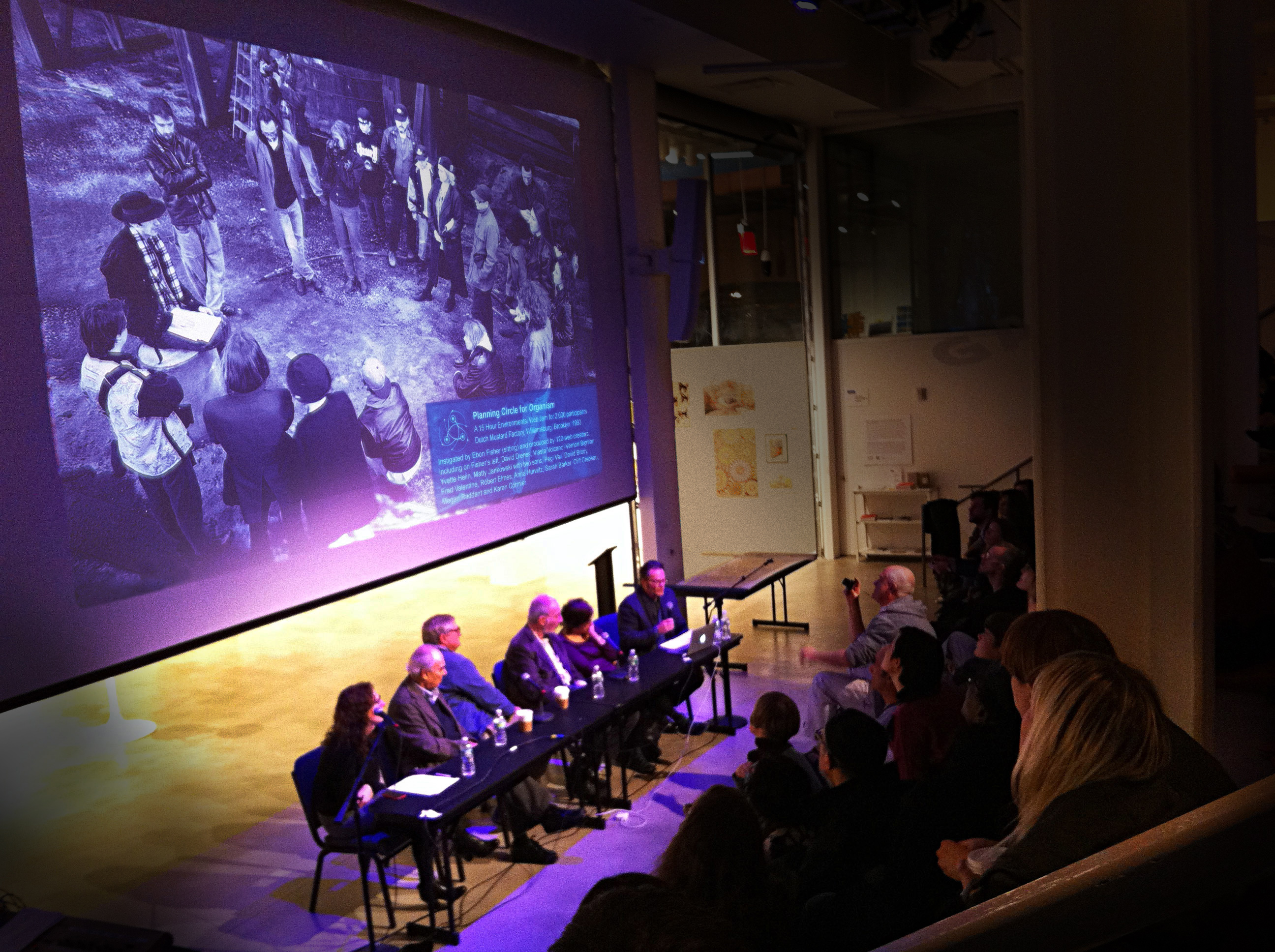
Panel discussion at BRIC Arts on New York’s creative pioneers. At the discussion, “Pioneers! O’ Pioneers” in Brooklyn, 2016, Joe Amrhein of Pierogi Gallery presents a slide of a planning circle for Organism, an event which drew in over 2,000 people for an all night “web jam” in Williamsburg, Brooklyn. Ebon Fisher, who directed Organism, is in the slide on the left in the black hat. Other panelists at BRIC Arts: Irving Sandler, Joyce Kozloff, Max Kozloff, Walter Robinson. Moderated by Paddy Johnson.

Much of Fisher's work and writing anticipates the undermining of objective truth which advanced digital systems have contributed to in the 21st century. Beginning with his multimedia information ritual, Viscera, at MIT, Fisher has redefined both art and technology as forms of environmental nurturing and cultivation. Years after Fisher's early cultural experiments, psychologists began to embrace embodied and extended forms of cognition. Treating reality as an ecological continuum between mind and environment has gained further traction since the advent of Artificial Intelligence. In addition to teaching at MIT, the Massachusetts College of Art, the New School, and the University of Iowa, Fisher has been invited to speak at New York University, Sarah Lawrence College, Bennington College, the University of Washington, the Rennselaer Polytechnic Institute, and Columbia University. He has written on media and the arts for Art Byte, the Utne Reader, Digital Creativity Journal, the Walker Arts Center, the New York Council for the Arts and MIT’s Leonardo Journal. His bionic terms have appeared in Wired Magazine and numerous dictionaries and glossaries. Fisher has given a TEDx talk at the Academy of Art in Vilnius, Lithuania, and a Banquet Keynote at the Information Technology (IT) Revolutions Conference in Venice, Italy, sponsored by the European Union.

In 1998 Fisher was invited by the University of Iowa to create a new media arts program which he directed for three years under the name Digital Worlds. In 2001 Hunter College invited Fisher to become an associate professor at a new media arts program, but due to New York’s fiscal contraction following the attack on the World Trade Center, the program Fisher joined was suspended. Fisher then moved with his young family to the Pinelands National Reserve in New Jersey where he began to develop an independent media studio by the Rancocas River. In 2005, a retrospective of Ebon Fisher's works was presented by the curator, Darrell Taylor, at the University of Northern Iowa. That 5,000 sq. ft. exhibition led to an invitation to become the 2005 Marjorie Rankin Scholar-in-Residence at Drexel University. In 2006 Fisher collaborated with NPR commentator, Andrei Codrescu, on the creation of a new Zoacode, "Signal Strangely," which reflected Codrescu's stormlike travel patterns as he sought support for the survivors of Hurricane Katrina. In 2006, Fisher became a full time “affiliate associate professor” at the Stevens Institute of Technology in Hoboken, NJ, where he and a colleague, Prof. Quynh Dinh, received a National Science Foundation grant for a "Transmedia Search Engine." At the Stevens Institute he was interviewed extensively by Marcin Ramocki for his documentary, Brooklyn DIY, which premiered to a sold-out audience at the Museum of Modern Art in 2009. Fisher left Stevens that same year after enduring exploitive working conditions at Stevens which eventually led to the removal of the institute's president by the Attorney General of New Jersey. Fisher has returned to cultivating The Nervepool and its nerve-like ethics, the Zoacodes. His transmedia world has moved 80 miles south of New York to the Pinelands National Reserve where Fisher began to immerse himself and other media artists in the local wildlife, extracting video footage from those multi-species relationships for a fictional series called Zoapool or “living pool.”

=== Submodernism ===
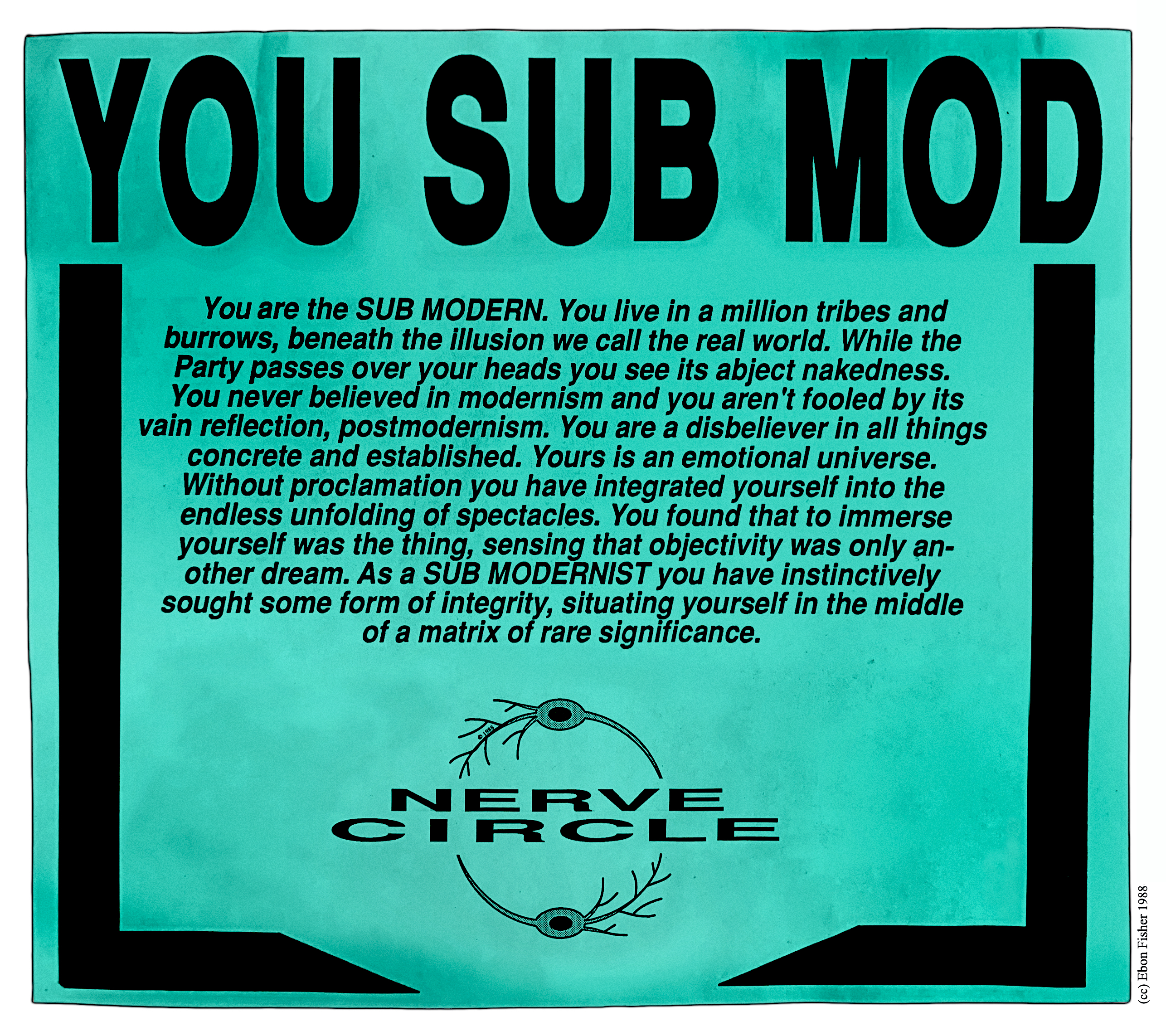
You Sub Mod: a manifesto celebrating submodernism, a philosophy of deep environmental participation. It was written by Ebon Fisher for his immersive theater company, Nerve Circle, the year Fisher moved to Williamsburg, Brooklyn in 1988.

Ever since he spray-painted a series of neurons in the streets of Pittsburgh as an art student, Ebon Fisher sought to move his creative operations out of the ivory tower and immerse it in a public arena. A manifesto on environmental immersion that Fisher wrote in 1988 and posted in the streets of Williamsburg was discussed in 2023 by music historian, Cisco Bradley. In his book, The Williamsburg Avant-garde: Music and Sound on the Brooklyn Waterfront, Bradley notes that Fisher's manifesto, You Sub Mod helped to shape the discourse of Williamsburg's creative community and quotes Fisher on the contrast between the postmodern approach to culture and that of the Immersionists: “Postmodern deconstruction was over. Immersionism was about biological congealing and the vitality born from such convergence.”

According to Bradley the aesthetic philosophy Fisher helped to launch was pivotal in transitioning away from the cynicism of postmodern theories of art and culture. Fisher's Quaker upbringing in Philadelphia, and his experiences at the Meeting School, a Quaker educational experiment on a farm in New Hampshire, were significant influences on his ecological approach to culture.

=== Wigglism ===
Ebon Fisher followed You Sub Mod eight years later with another manifesto, Wigglism. As he states in Digital Creativity and later in Leonardo Journal, he formally invited the online public in 1996 to contribute to its evolution, establishing Wigglism as one of the first internet-based, open source systems of philosophy. Following the emergence of the project online, Wired Magazine describes Wigglism in the language of the emerging digital culture as a "super-fuzzy, interactive, open source, self-constructing media organism.” Inspired by both the living community networks in Williamsburg, Brooklyn, and the collaborative side of the internet culture, Wigglism promoted the notion that the truth, or that which seems true, is interactively constructed with the whole world, not just with other humans or within the narrow confines of academic discourse. The most significant property of an interactively determined truth is not its empirical veracity but the vitality in the collaboration in which it emerges. Wigglism also points to a post-art, post-science, ecological world in which both objective reality and subjective aesthetics give way to a media organism living inside a subjective ecosystem. This supports an emerging green culture underscored by an ethic of nurturing vital systems.

In 1998 Jennifer Cobb discusses Wigglism in her book, Cyber Grace: The Search for God in the Digital Age. Expressing concerns that IBM’s artificial intelligence, Deep Blue, had just beaten the ranking world chess champion, Gary Kasparov, she asks the question, “If a mere machine can best us in a game considered by many as a pinnacle of human reason, what does it mean to be human?” For Cobb, Wigglism was one way to address this predicament. The problem of artificial intelligence is mute if both humans and their machines are no longer considered separate from the world and capable of objectivity. Intelligence, in effect, is redefined as environmental intelligence, a collaboration with the world. In Cybergrace, Cobb discusses an interview she conducted with Fisher in 1997:

“Wigglism has been circulating, evolving and growing as people attach comments and ideas to it. Fisher writes, ‘The essence of the project is to abandon the discourse of art (a humanist creature) and redefine cultural activity as an act of coilings, creating vital lifeforms.’”

Cobb then quotes what she considered key passages from the Wigglism manifesto in its early stages of evolution. They underscore how sharing and sustaining that which is lively, a shared environmental presence, bypasses the entire question whether humans or machines can monopolize the truth:

“‘We nurture that which wiggles — of flesh or steel, sinew or circuit, mud or imagination; transmuting art into a zoology of spirit... We dissolve every bloodless workstation, artifact, and module of consumption, into the acids of living ritual. We grow connections in an ecology of twitches and presences; soaking tendrils of thought and conscience in a spray of fibrous feedback; infusing phantoms and facts with equal measures of visceral signficance; writhing among the rivulets and curls of screaming knowledge... We struggle to love these creatures, these convulsions, to keep that which is lively, and that which sustains life, in supreme focus.’”

== See also ==
- Williamsburg, Brooklyn
- Brooklyn Immersionists
- Post-postmodernism

== Bibliography ==
- Jonathan Fineberg, Art Since 1940: Strategies of Being, Abrams/Prentice Hall, 1995/2000
- Claudia Steinberg, "Vis-a-vis Manhattan," Die Zeit, 1997
- Frank Popper, From Technological to Virtual Art, MIT Press, 2007
- Frank Popper, "Ebon Fisher," Contemporary Artists, ed. by Tom and Sarah Pendergast, St. James Press, 2002
- Ebon Fisher, Music, "Circulate All Sensation," in CD Anthology, State of the Union, compiled by Elliott Sharp, 1996
- Sylvie Myerson & Vidyut Jain, "Interview with Ebon Fisher," Sandbox Magazine, 1996
- David Alm, "Soft Machines: Ebon Fisher Coils into Gentle Linkage," RES Magazine, vol. 4 no. 4, 2001
- Ebon Fisher, “Wigglism: A Philosophoid Entity Turns 10,” Leonardo Journal Vol. 40, Number I, 2007
- Flash Art, Interview with Annie Herron, director of Test-Site Gallery, Brooklyn, Feb. 1993
- Charles Runette, "The New York Cyber 60," New York Magazine, Nov. 13, 1995
