= Château de Linardié =

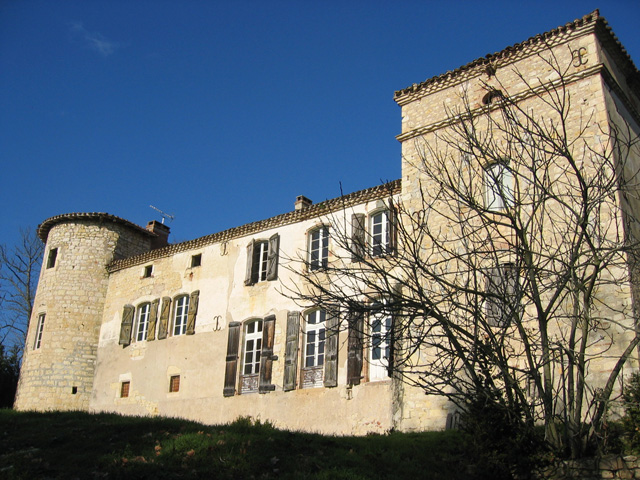
Château de Linardié

Château de Linardié is the name for a once active cultural center located in the South West area of France seven kilometres from Gaillac in the Tarn, France. It operated for 10 years, from 1996 to 2006.

== History ==
Château de Linardié functioned with the financial support from the town of Gaillac (led by its dynamic Mayor Charles Pistre), from the Department of the Tarn, and from the Midi-Pyrénées region. The project entailed the physical restoration of the Château itself and the establishment of an Association to run its activities. Founder David Marshall began work on the Château on 8 January 1996 and the Association Culturelle du Château de Linardié was officially declared on 6 November 1996.

Château de Linardié employed secretarial and administrative personnel and appointed as artistic director, Danielle Delouche, a graduate from the University of Sorbonne VIII, Paris, and a specialist in Art History, who has been a contributor to numerous art and design periodicals. The Association collaborated with the University of Toulouse le Mirail, where the Director of the Department of Fine Arts and Applied Arts, Xavier Lambert, as well as the Maître des Conférences, Carole Hoffman, were responsible for seminars, colloquia, and conferences. They were especially helpful in helping Linardié develop its artistic policy. Another key person was Francis Pratt, a former research fellow at the University of Stirling in Scotland where he was a founder member of the Vision Group.

Due to legal difficulties encountered by Gaillac, the town was forced to cede ownership of the Château in September 2006. It is no longer available to the Association and is now rapidly falling back into the state of ruin from which David Marshall rescued it in 1996.

== Artists exhibited at Château de Linardié ==
- Jacky BORZYCKI / painting 5 to 25 May 1997 France
- Isabelle MAUREAU / painting 6 to 14 May 1998 France
- Linda SHEPARD / glasswork 4 to 28 June 1998 U.S.A.
- Thérèse BRANDEAU / sculpture 6 to 30 August 1998 France
- Hilary McMICHAEL / painting 17 September to 18 October 1998 UK.
- Anne McMICHAEL / ceramics 17 September to 18 October 1998 UK.
- Vi N'GUYEN / painted sculpture 22 October to 15 November 1998 Vietnam
- Paul REY / painting 1 to 25 April 1999 France
- Marianne CATROUX / relief 10 June to 4 July 1999 France
- Katherine BOUCHARD / installation 15 July to 22 August 1999 Canada
- Francis PRATT / painting 15 July to 22 August 1999 UK.
- Roger BRACE / painting 15 July to 22 August 1999 UK.
- Jill LANE / painting 15 July to 22 August 1999 UK.
- Frank TOURREL / painting 2 to 26 September 1999 France
- Patrick COHN / multi media 7 to 31 October 1999 France
- CATERINA / painting 16 March to 9 April 2000 France
- Jacky BORZYCKI / painting 11 May to 3 June 2000 France
- Françoise BERTHELOT / sculpture 8 July to 31 August 2000 France
- Joe BIGBIG / sculpture 8 July to 31 August 2000 Ghana
- Patrick COHN / installation 8 July to 31 August 2000 France
- Nacéra DÉSIGAUD / sculpture 8 July to 31 August 2000 Algeria
- Patrick DIAZ sculpture 8 July to 31 August 2000 France
- Thierry FRUMIN / installation 8 July to 31 August 2000 France
- Jean-Baptiste GAUDIN / installation 8 July to 31 August 2000 France
- Ernst GOTTSCHALK / sculpture 8 July to 31 August 2000 UK.
- Xavier KREBS / painting 8 July to 31 August 2000 France
- Stephen MARSDEN / painting 8 July to 31 August 2000 UK.
- David MARSHALL / ceramics 8 July to 31 August 2000 UK.
- Francis MASCLES / sculpture 8 July to 31 August 2000 France
- Véronique MATTEUDI / sculpture 8 July to 31 August 2000 France
- Abel REIS / sculpture 8 July to 31 August 2000 Brazil
- Linda SHEPARD / glasswork 8 July to 31 August 2000 U.S.A.
- Laure TETAR / multi media 12 October to 12 November 2000 France
- Vincent GIOUSE / drawing 5 April to 20 May 2001 France
- David RIBAS / painting 25 May to 1 July 2001 France
- Anne FLEURY / painting 25 May to 1 July 2001 France
- Marianne CATROUX / relief 8 July to 2 September 2001 French
- Linda SHEPARD / glasswork 8 July to 2 September 2001 U.S.A.
- Tidjane SEKOU TRAORÉ / sculpture 8 July to 2 September 2001 Burkina-Faso
- Andrée OMNES-PLAT / drawing 7 September to 7 October 2001 France
- Philippe ASSALIT / photography 21 October to 5 November 2001 France
- Élisabeth POIRET / painting 28 March to 28 April 2002 France
- Paul VILLAIN / poetry 28 March to 28 April 2002 France
- Marika PERROS / painting 5 May to 23 June 2002 France
- Jean-Philippe BAERT / installation 4 July to 25 August 2002 France
- Patrick COHN / installation 4 July to 25 August 2002 France
- Marie MAQUAIRE / video 4 July to 25 August 2002 France
- Monsieur CLUB & the Jim Caddy's Assistants / video – multi media 4 July to 25 August 2002 Germany France
- Rémi PAPILLAULT / architect – installation 4 July to 25 August 2002 France
- Alain JOSSEAU / multi media – installation 5 September to 20 October 2002 France
- Agnès CHARBONNEL / photography 27 October to 24 November 2002 France
- Sylvie FONTAYNE / photography 27 October to 24 November 2002 France
- Anne MONTAUT / photography 27 October to 24 November 2002 France
- Christine MORAZIN / photography 27 October to 24 November 2002 France
- Fabrice DESAMIS / painting – collage 3 April to 18 May 2003 France
- Eric ANDRÉATTA / installation – video 7 July to 31 August 2003 France
- Claude FAURE / installation 7 July to 31 August 2003 France
- Jakob GAUTEL / installation 7 July to 31 August 2003 Germany
- Jason KARAÏNDROS / installation 7 July to 31 August 2003 France
- Xavier LAMBERT / multi media 7 July to 31 August 2003 France
- Miller LEVY / video 7 July to 31 August 2003 France
- Pol PEREZ / installation 7 July to 31 August 2003 France
- Les REQUINS MARTEAUX / installation 7 July to 31 August 2003 France
- Pierrick SORIN / video 7 July to 31 August 2003 France
- Véronique BARTHE / photography 7 September to 19 October 2003 France
- Mireille LOUP / multi media – video 7 September to 19 October 2003 France
- Mabel ODESSEY / photography 26 October to 23 November 2003 U.S.A.
- Carole AUBERT / painting – installation 23 May to 27 June 2004 France
- Didier CROS / painting 23 May to 27 June 2004 France
- Chu-Yin CHEN / video – multi media 4 July to 29 August 2004 Korea
- LAWICKMÜLLER / digital photography 4 July to 29 August 2004 Germany
- Stéphane MASSON / installation 4 July to 29 August 2004 France
- Orlan / multi media – photography 4 July to 29 August 2004 France
- Nicole TRAN BA VANG / digital photography 4 July to 29 August 2004 Vietnam
- Zhou XIAOHU / video installation 4 July to 29 August 2004 China
- Ghizlane ABBADI / video 5 September to 17 October 2004 Morocco
- Frédéric BELLI / painting – installation 5 September to 17 October 2004 France
- Shadi GHADIRIAN / photography 5 September to 17 October 2004 Iran
- Claude JEANMART / digital photography 5 September to 17 October 2004 France
- Ginette LAFON / photography – installation 5 September to 17 October 2004 France
- Véronique SAPIN / Video 5 September to 17 October 2004 France
- Alice ODILON / photography 24 September to 28 November 2004 France
- Thanos CHRYSAKIS / sound installation 3 April to 8 May 2005 Greece
- Pascal Dombis / multi media installation 3 April to 8 May 2005 France
- Francis PRATT / painting – Science 3 April to 8 May 2005 UK.
- Rachel HENRIOT / multi media – video 15 May to 26 June 2005 France
- Louis BEC / multi media installation – Science 3 July to 28 August 2005 France
- Michel BRET / multi media 3 July to 28 August 2005 France
- Edmond Couchot / multi media 3 July to 28 August 2005 France
- Carmen MARISCAL / photography installation 3 July to 28 August 2005 Mexico
- Karl Sims / video 3 July to 28 August 2005 U.S.A.
- Marie-Hélène TRAMUS / multi media 3 July to 28 August 2005 France
- Joseph Nechvatal / painting – Science 4 September to 16 October 2005 U.S.A.
- Laurence DEMAISON / photography 30 October to 27 November 2005 France
- Hans BOUMAN / video 11 March to 7 May 2006 Holland
- Andrea FORTINA / painting 11 March to 7 May 2006 Italy
- Gilles GHEZ / modelage installation 11 March to 7 May 2006 France
- Anne GOROUBEN / drawing – painting 11 March to 7 May 2006 France
- Claude JEANMART / video multi media 11 March to 7 May 2006 France
- Paloma NAVARES / photography 11 March to 7 May 2006 Spain
- Vladimir SKODA / sculpture 11 March to 7 May 2006 Czech Rep.
- Jack VANARSKY / installation 11 March to 7 May 2006 Argentina
- Paloma Navares / photography – installation 3 June to 20 August 2006 Spain
