= Rutherford Chang =

Taiwanese-American conceptual artist (1979–2025)

- Chang in 2013, with his collection of first pressings of the Beatles' self-titled album
- Born: December 27, 1979; Houston, Texas, U.S.
- Died: January 24, 2025 (aged 45)
- Education: Wesleyan University
- Occupation: Conceptual Artist
- Parent: Jason Chang
- Website: rutherfordchang.com

Rutherford Chang (December 27, 1979 – January 24, 2025) was an American conceptual artist. His post-conceptual projects included a collection of 3,417 copies of the Beatles's self-titled 1968 album. At the age of 45, he died in Manhattan on January 24, 2025.

== Formation ==
Chang was born on December 27, 1979, in Houston, Texas, to Taiwanese parents. His father was the billionaire Jason Chang. Chang grew up in Los Altos Hills, California. As a child, he enjoyed collecting, with one of his first collections being fruit stickers which he covered a binder with. He would go on to collect numerous other things, including receipts, postcards, baseball bats, hotel stationery, and old Chinese megaphones. Chang majored in psychology and received a bachelor's degree from Wesleyan University in 2002. During that time, he was housemates with Japanese artist Aki Sasamoto. He then worked as an artist assistant for Xu Bing in Manhattan for two years.

== Conceptual art projects ==
In 2008, Chang collected around 4,000 ink-dot portraits from The Wall Street Journal and reorganized them alphabetically into a yearbook-style publication titled The Class of 2008. Some portraits appeared multiple times, with that year's successful Presidential candidate Barack Obama appearing 94 times and his Republican rival John McCain appearing 74 times. In 2012, the project was displayed at the White Space Gallery in Beijing. Chang's conceptual art projects also included a block of 10,000 melted pennies and his attempts to beat the high score for Tetris.

== Beatles White Album project ==
Chang posted a photograph of each of his 3,417 The Beatles album covers (all white and numbered, as conceptualized by British conceptual artist Richard Hamilton) on Instagram at webuywhitealbums. In 2013, Chang released a double vinyl noise music record in a limited edition of 800 called White Album x 100 made by layering 100 copies of the Beatles' 1968 double LP The Beatles, better known as the White Album, playing simultaneously.
