= Systems art =

Art influenced by cybernetics and systems theory

Kenneth Noland, Trans West, 1965.

Systems art is art influenced by cybernetics and systems theory, reflecting on natural systems, social systems, and the social signs of the art world itself.

Systems art emerged as part of the first wave of the conceptual art movement in the 1960s and 1970s. Closely related and overlapping terms include anti-form movement, cybernetic art, generative systems, process art, systems aesthetic, systemic art, systemic painting, and systems sculpture.

== Related fields of systems art ==
=== Anti-form movement ===
By the early 1960s, minimalism had emerged as an abstract movement in art, with roots in geometric abstraction via Malevich, the Bauhaus, and Mondrian. This movement rejected the ideas of relational and subjective painting, the complexity of abstract expressionist surfaces, and the emotional zeitgeist and polemics present in action painting. Minimalism argued that extreme simplicity could capture all of the sublime representation needed in art. The term Systematic art was coined by Lawrence Alloway in 1966 to describe the method that artists such as Kenneth Noland, Al Held, and Frank Stella were using to compose abstract paintings.

Associated with painters such as Frank Stella, minimalism in painting, as opposed to other areas, is a modernist movement. Depending on the context, minimalism might be construed as a precursor to the postmodern movement. Some writers classify it as a postmodern movement, noting that early minimalism began and succeeded as a modernist movement, producing advanced works but partially abandoning this project when some artists shifted towards the anti-form movement.

In the late 1960s, the term postminimalism was coined by Robert Pincus-Witten to describe minimalist-derived art that incorporated content and contextual overtones that minimalism had rejected. This term was applied to the work of Eva Hesse, Keith Sonnier, Richard Serra, and new work by former minimalists such as Robert Smithson, Robert Morris, Bruce Nauman, Sol LeWitt, Barry Le Va, and others. Minimalists like Donald Judd, Dan Flavin, Carl Andre, Agnes Martin, John McCracken, and others continued to produce their late modernist paintings and sculptures for the remainder of their careers.

=== Cybernetic art ===
Audio feedback, tape loops, sound synthesis, and computer-generated compositions reflect a cybernetic awareness of information, systems, and cycles. These techniques became widespread in the 1960s music industry. The visual effects of electronic feedback became a focus of artistic research in the late 1960s when video equipment first reached the consumer market. For example, Steina and Woody Vasulka used "all manner and combination of audio and video signals to generate electronic feedback in their respective media."

Related work by Edward Ihnatowicz, Wen-Ying Tsai, cybernetician Gordon Pask, and the animist kinetics of Robert Breer and Jean Tinguely contributed to a strain of cybernetic art in the 1960s that was concerned with the shared circuits within and between the living and the technological. During this period, a line of cybernetic art theory also emerged. Writers such as Jonathan Benthall and Gene Youngblood drew on cybernetics. Notable contributors include British artist and theorist Roy Ascott, with his essay "Behaviourist Art and the Cybernetic Vision" published in the journal Cybernetica (1966–67), and American critic and theorist Jack Burnham. In his 1968 work Beyond Modern Sculpture, Burnham develops a theory of cybernetic art that centers on art's drive to imitate and ultimately reproduce life. Additionally, in 1968, curator Jasia Reichardt organized the landmark exhibition Cybernetic Serendipity at the Institute of Contemporary Arts in London.

=== Generative systems ===
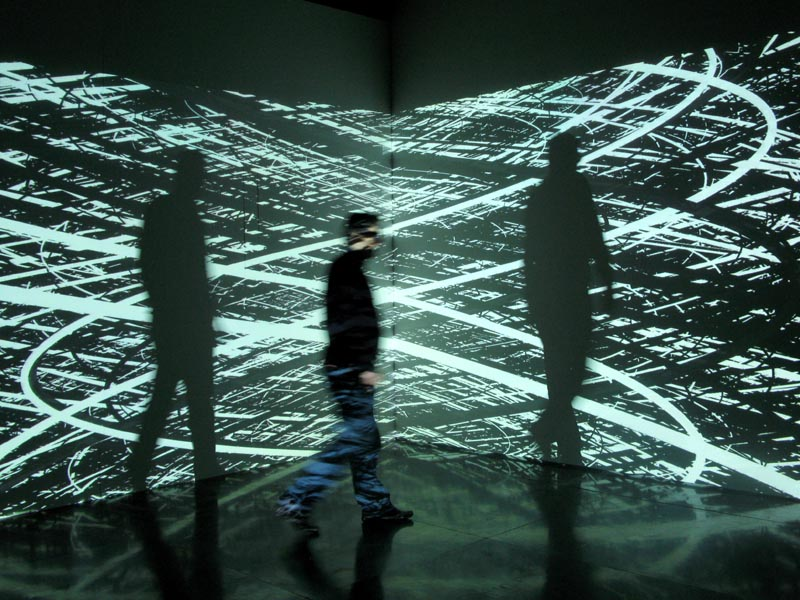
Installation view of Irrational Geometrics (2008) by Pascal Dombis

Generative art is art that is created through algorithmic processes, using systems defined by computer software, algorithms, or similar mathematical, mechanical, or randomized autonomous methods. Sonia Landy Sheridan established the Generative Systems program at the School of the Art Institute of Chicago in 1970 in response to social changes brought about in part by the computer-robot communications revolution. The program, which brought artists and scientists together, aimed to transform the artist's role from passive to active by exploring contemporary scientific and technological systems and their relation to art and life. Unlike copier art, which was a commercial spin-off, Generative Systems was involved in developing elegant and simple systems intended for creative use by the general public. Generative Systems artists sought to bridge the gap between elite and novice by facilitating communication between the two, thus disseminating first-generation information to a broader audience and bypassing traditional commercial routes.

=== Process art ===
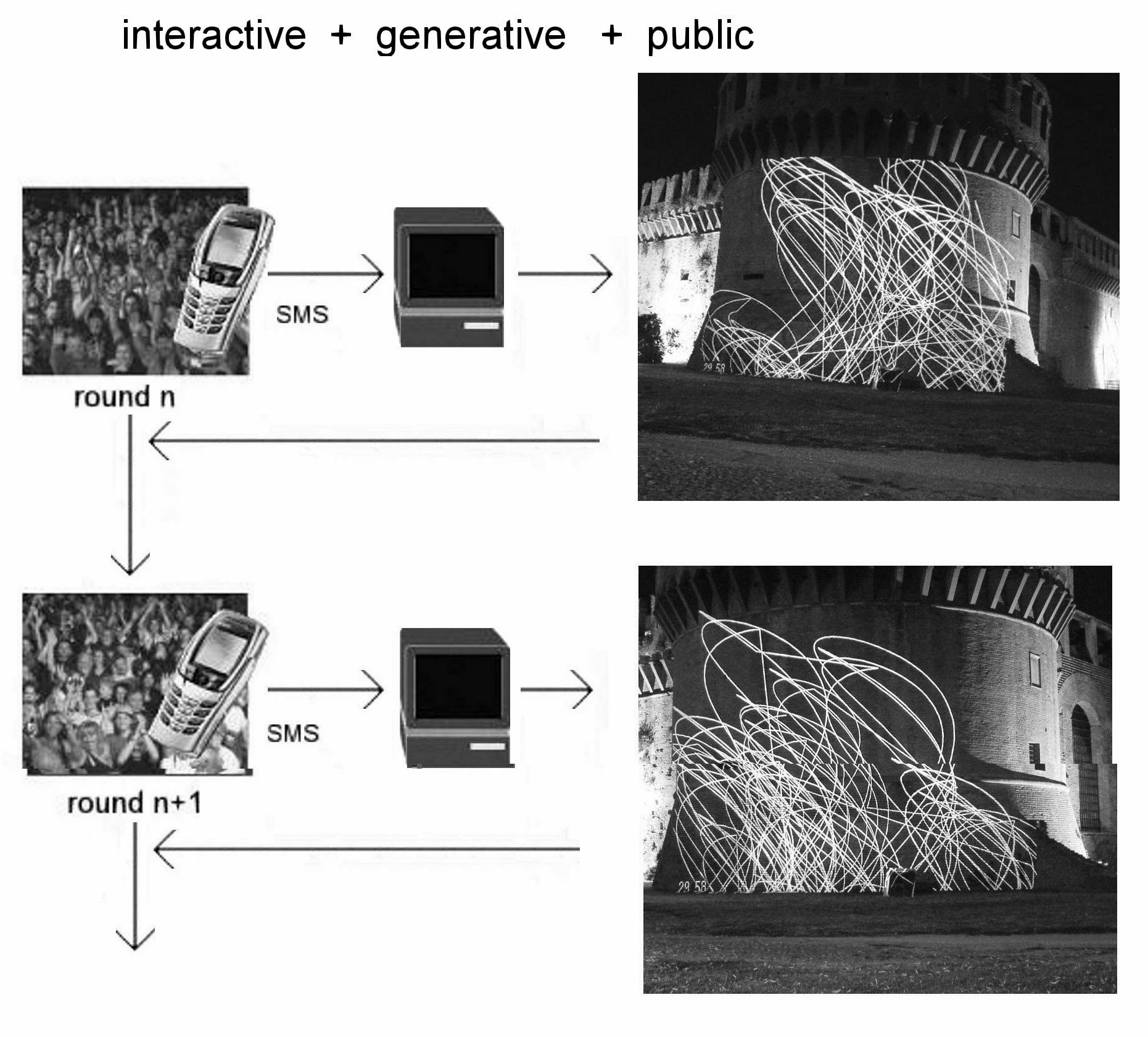
Maurizio Bolognini, Collective Intelligence Machines series (CIMs, from 2000). These are generative and interactive installations using the mobile phone network and participation technologies from e-democracy.

Process art is an artistic movement and creative sentiment where the end product of art and craft is not the principal focus. The 'process' in process art refers to the act of creating art: the gathering, sorting, collating, associating, and patterning. Process art emphasizes the actual doing—art as a rite, ritual, and performance. It often involves inherent motivation, rationale, and intentionality. Thus, art is seen as a creative journey or process, rather than merely a final product.

In artistic discourse, the work of Jackson Pollock as a type of action painting is sometimes considered a precursor to process art. Process art, with its use of serendipity, shares similarities with Dada. Themes of change and transience are prominent in the process art movement. According to the Solomon R. Guggenheim Museum, Robert Morris had a groundbreaking exhibition in 1968 that defined the movement. The museum's website notes that "Process artists were involved in issues attendant to the body, random occurrences, improvisation, and the liberating qualities of nontraditional materials such as wax, felt, and latex. Using these, they created eccentric forms in erratic or irregular arrangements produced by actions such as cutting, hanging, and dropping, or organic processes such as growth, condensation, freezing, or decomposition".

=== Systemic art ===
According to Chilvers (2004), "earlier in 1966 the British art critic Lawrence Alloway had coined the term "Systemic art", to describe a type of abstract art characterized by the use of very simple standardized forms, usually geometric in character, either in a single concentrated image, or repeated in a system arranged according to a clearly visible principle of organization. He considered the chevron paintings of Kenneth Noland as examples of Systemic art, and considered this as a branch of Minimal art".

John G. Harries identified common ground in the ideas underlying developments in 20th-century art such as Serial art, Systems art, Constructivism, and Kinetic art. These forms of art often do not stem directly from observations of the external natural environment but from the observation of depicted shapes and their relationships. According to Harries, Systems art represents a deliberate attempt by artists to develop a more flexible frame of reference. Rather than being a cognitive system that leads to the institutionalization of an imposed model, it uses its frame of reference as a model to be emulated. However, transferring the meaning of a picture to its location within a systemic structure does not eliminate the need to define the constitutive elements of the system. Without these definitions, constructing the system becomes challenging.

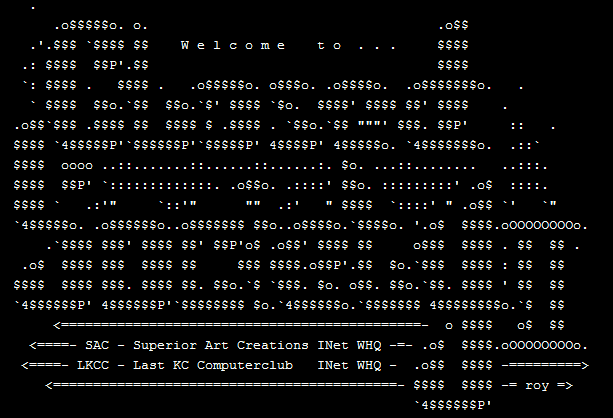
Newskool ASCII art Screenshot

=== Systemic painting ===
Systemic Painting, according to Auping (1989), "was the title of a highly influential exhibition at the Guggenheim Museum in 1966 assembled and introduction written by Lawrence Alloway as curator. The show contained numerous works that many critics today would consider part of the Minimal art". In the catalogue, Alloway noted that "...paintings, such as those in this exhibition are not, as has been often claimed, impersonal. The personal is not expunged by using a neat technique: anonymity is not a consequence of highly finishing a painting". The term "Systemic Painting" later came to refer to artists who employ systems to make a number of aesthetic decisions before commencing to paint.

=== Systems sculpture ===
According to Feldman (1987), "serial art, serial painting, systems sculpture and ABC art, were art styles of the 1960s and 1970s in which simple geometric configurations are repeated with little or no variation. Sequences becomes important as in mathematics and linguistic context. These works rely on simple arrangements of basic volumes and voids, mechanically produced surfaces, and algebraic permutations of form. The impact on the viewer, however, is anything but simple".

== See also ==
- Algorithmic art
- Computer art
- Conceptual art
- Design
- Evolutionary art
- Fractal art
- Generative art
- Information art
- Interactive art
- Media art
- Participatory art
- Process music
- Software art
- Sustainable art
- Systems thinking
- Systems music
- Systems Group
