= Expanded Cinema =

1970 Gene Youngblood book

- Author: Gene Youngblood
- Language: English
- Genre: Non-fiction
- Publication date: 1970

Expanded Cinema by Gene Youngblood (1970), the first book to consider video as an art form, was influential in establishing the field of media arts. In the book he argues that a new, expanded cinema is required for a new consciousness. He describes various types of filmmaking utilizing new technology, including film special effects, computer art, video art, multi-media environments and holography.

== Synopsis ==
=== "Part One: The Audience and the Myth of Entertainment" ===
In the first part of the book, Youngblood attempts to show how expanded cinema will unite art and life. "Television's elaborate movie-like subjective-camera simulation of the first moon landing" (p46) showed a generation that reality was not as real as simulation. He says that he is writing "at the end of the era of cinema as we've known it, the beginning of an era of image-exchange between man and man" (p. 49). The future shock of the Paleocybernetic Age will change fundamental concepts such as intelligence, morality, creativity and the family (pp. 50–53). The Intermedia network of the mass media is contemporary man's environment, replacing nature. He uses recent scientific research into cellular memory and inherited memory to support his claim that this network conditions human experience. The Noosphere (a term Youngblood borrows from Teilhard de Chardin) is the organizing intelligence of the planet—the minds of its inhabitants. "Distributed around the globe by the intermedia network, it becomes a new technology that may prove to be one of the most powerful tools in man's history" (p. 57). He defends the universality of art against the localism of entertainment:

The intermedia network has made all of us artists by proxy. A decade of television-watching is equal to a comprehensive course in dramatic acting, writing, and filming...the mystique is gone—we could almost do it ourselves. Unfortunately too many of us do just that: hence the glut of sub-mediocre talent in the entertainment industry.

— p. 58

This is what forces cinema to expand and become more complex. Mass media entertainment dulls people's minds. It is a closed, entropic system, adding nothing new. (pp. 59–65) Entertainment dwells on the past. We live in future shock so art should be an invention of a future (pp. 66–69). New systems need to be designed for old information. The artist is a design scientist.

=== "Part Two: Synaesthetic Cinema: The End of Drama" ===
Youngblood describes television as the software of the planet. It acts as a superego and shows us global reality. This renders cinema obsolete as a communicator of objective reality, and so frees it (pp. 78–80). He embraces a synaesthetic synthesis of opposites which are simultaneously perceived. He then goes on to draw a distinction between the syncretic montage of Pudovkin and the Eisenstein's montage of collision (pp. 84–86). He prefers metamorphosis to cuts (p86). Filmmakers that Youngblood think embody this synesthetic syncretism include: Stan Brakhage (p. 87), Will Hindle, Pat O'Neill, John Schofill, and Ronald Nameth. Filmmakers that present ideas of polymorphous eroticism, the blurring of sexual boundaries, include Andy Warhol and Carolee Schneemann (pp. 112–121). Michael Snow's Wavelength is also an example of synaesthetic cinema's extra-objective reality (pp. 122–127). At the end of the second part of the book Youngblood writes about the rebirth of the cottage industry in the post-mass-audience age. Video tapes can be exchanged freely, films are becoming more personal, specializations are ending (pp. 128–134).

=== "Part Three: Toward Cosmic Consciousness" ===
Youngblood analyses 2001: A Space Odyssey to explore the "electronic age existentialism" (pp. 139–150). He examines Douglas Trumbull's use of mechanical processes to create the Stargate sequence (pp. 151–156) and describes the work of Jordan Belson as an example of cosmic cinema (pp. 157–177).

=== "Part Four: Cybernetic Cinema and Computer Films" ===
Youngblood defines the technosphere as a symbiosis between man and machine. The computer liberates man from specialization and amplifies intelligence (pp. 180–182). He draws comparisons between computer processing and human neural processing (pp. 183–184). Logic and intelligence is the brain's software. He predicts that computer software will become more important than hardware and that in the future super-computers will design ever more advanced computers (pp. 185–188). His vision of the future is the Aesthetic Machine: "Aesthetic application of technology is the only means of achieving new consciousness to match our environment" (p189). Creativity will be shared between man and machine. He points to the links between computer art and Conceptualism, and the growing theoretical basis of art. In his cybernetic art exploration of Cybernetic Cinema he gives an account of early experiments using computers to draw and make films. He bemoans the fact that at the time of writing no computer has the power to generate real-time images and that computer art has to be made off-line. He does, though, foresee a future in which location shooting will become obsolete as all locations will be able to be simulated with computers (pp. 194–206). Examples of filmmakers using computers, referred to by Youngblood, include: John Whitney, James Whitney, John Whitney, Jr., Michael Whitney, John Stehura, Stan VanDerBeek and Peter Kamnitzer (pp. 207–256).

=== "Part Five: Television as a Creative Medium" ===
Youngblood describes the videosphere, in which computers and televisions are extensions to man's central nervous system. He is optimistic about technological advances and predicts TV-on-demand by 1978 (pp. 260–264). He does acknowledge, however, that data retrieval is more complicated than data recording. The various processes involved in video synthesizing are described: de-beaming, keying, chroma-keying, feedback, mixing, switching and editing (pp. 265–280). The work of Loren Sears is neuroesthetic because it treats television as an extension of the central nervous system (pp. 291–295). The curator James Newman moved from a traditional gallery to a conceptual gallery with his joint project with KQED-TV, commissioning television work from Terry Riley, Yvonne Rainer, Frank Zappa, Andy Warhol, The Living Theater, Robert Frank and Walter De Maria (pp. 292–293). Nam June Paik has worked creatively with television (pp. 302–308). Les Levine exploits the potential of closed-circuit television (pp. 337–344).

=== "Part Six: Intermedia" ===
Youngblood sees the artist as an ecologist, involved with the environment rather than with objects (pp. 346–351). By way of example he cites the video displays at world expositions (specifically Roman Kroitor's large-scale projections at Expo 67 and Expo '70 (pp. 352–358), and the Cerebrum, an art/nightclub environment. Artists such as Carolee Schneemann and Robert Whitman combine film projection with live performance (pp. 366–371). Wolf Vostell incorporates video experiments into environmental contexts (p. 383). Light shows are used in concerts and multiple projectors and video screens create complex environments.

=== "Part Seven: Holographic Cinema: A New World" ===
Finally, Youngblood explores the creative potential of holography.

== Key ideas ==
- Future shock
- Intermedia
- Neuroesthetics
- Noosphere
- Synaesthesia
