= Ruairi Glynn =

Ruairi Glynn (born 1981) is an installation artist who has exhibited internationally with shows at the Centre Pompidou Paris, the National Art Museum of China Beijing, and the Tate Modern, London. His kinetic and interactive art works reflect on rapid developments in robotics, and machine intelligence, exploring "the emerging aesthetics of behaviour permeating across art, architecture and design".

== Solo work ==
- Performative Ecologies (2007–2011) Kunsthaus, Graz (2007), Instituto Itaú cultural, São Paulo (2008), Seoul Olympic Museum of Art (2009), National Art Museum of China, Beijing (2011)
- Motive Colloquies Centre Pompidou, Paris (2011)
- Fearful Symmetry Tate Modern, London (2012), Instituto Itaú cultural, São Paulo (2016)

== Collaborative work ==
- Light Touch (with Haptic Architects & Chryssa Varna) Buro Happold Lobby, London (2013)
- Between the Lines (with Marshmallow Laser Feats & Studio Roso) London (2013)
- Balls (with Alma-nac Architects) Arup Headquarters Lobby, London (2014)
- Twitter Data Visualisation Table (Interactive Architecture Lab with onedotzero) Twitter Headquarters, San Francisco (2015), Cannes Lions Festival (2015)
- MyCup (Interactive Architecture Lab) Bank of America, Merrill Lynch Headquarters, UK (2016) commissioned by Create London

== Academia ==
He directs the Interactive Architecture Lab at the Bartlett School of Architecture, University College London. He is also Programme Director for the MArch Design for Performance and Interaction programme at the Bartlett.

He was previously an Associate Lecturer of MA Material Futures & MA Industrial Design at Central Saint Martins College, University of the Arts London and has acted as visiting tutor at European schools of design including the Angewandte Vienna, ETH Zurich, CITA Copenhagen and TU Delft.

Ruairi Glynn received his BSc in MediaLab Arts at the University of Plymouth in 2005, his Diploma and Masters in Architecture from University College London in 2007 and 2008 respectively where he studied under Stephen Gage and cybernetician Ranulph Glanville.
