= Postminimalism =

Art movement influenced by the aesthetic of minimalism

Postminimalism is an art term coined (as post-minimalism) by Robert Pincus-Witten in 1971 and used in various artistic fields for work which is influenced by, or attempts to develop and go beyond, the aesthetic of minimalism. The expression is used specifically in relation to music and the visual arts, but can refer to any field using minimalism as a critical reference point. In music, postminimalism refers to music following minimal music.

== Visual art ==
Postminimalist visual art uses minimalism either as a conceptual art aesthetic or a generative art practice. Like Fluxus, postminimalism is more of an artistic tendency than a particular style, but in general, postminimalist artworks often use everyday objects, simple materials, and sometimes take on a pure formalist aesthetic or post-conceptual approaches. However, since postminimalism includes such a diverse and disparate group of artists, it is impossible to enumerate all the continuities and similarities between them. But as two opposing examples, take the work of Eva Hesse and her use of modern art grids and minimalist seriality that were usually hand-made, introducing a human element into minimalism in contrast to the machine fabrication more typical of the minimalism of someone like Carl Andre. American sculptor Christopher Wilmarth falls within the post-Minimalist movement alongside Eva Hesse and Bruce Nauman. Wilmarth's work eschewed the perfect machine-made aesthetic of the minimalists, yet also resisted the process-oriented excess of much 1970s postminimalist sculpture. Richard Serra was another prominent postminimalist though his large metal sculptures are completely machine made.

== Music ==
In its general musical usage, "postminimalism" refers to works influenced by minimal music, and it is generally categorized within the meta-genre art music. Writer Kyle Gann has employed the term more strictly to denote the style that flourished in the 1980s and 1990s and characterized by:

1. a steady pulse, usually continuing throughout a work or movement;
2. a diatonic pitch language, tonal in effect but avoiding traditional functional tonality;
3. general evenness of dynamics, without strong climaxes or nuanced emotionalism; and
4. unlike minimalism, an avoidance of obvious or linear formal design.

Minimalist procedures such as additive and subtractive process are common in postminimalism, though usually in disguised form, and the style has also shown a capacity for absorbing influences from world and popular music (Balinese gamelan, bluegrass, Jewish cantillation, and so on).

== See also ==
- Holy minimalism
- Lyrical Abstraction
- Neo-expressionism
- New York School
- Fluxus
- Casualism
- Conceptual art
- Appropriation (art)
- Institutional Critique
- Postmodern art
- Post-conceptualism
- Art software
- Computer art
- Internet art
- Electronic art
- Systems art
- Cyberarts
- New Media
- New Media Art
- Computer generated music
- Generative art
- Monochrome painting
- Neo-minimalism
- Timbral listening
- Totalism (music)
