= Post-convergent =

Virtual worlds are an example of an early 21st-century post-convergent medium. Virtual worlds present a complex matrix of interdependent relationships among such media elements as sound, vision, network, time, interactivity, and other prior technologies. In this view, no individual media element comprising virtual worlds exists without the others and all affect each other, albeit not equally. Although this complex system contains many types of media, a user may choose to focus on only a single aspect, such as streaming an audio file. The potential for a rich engagement within and between agents within a medium is best characterized as Gilles Deleuze’s network of relations between differential velocities that are not distinguished by form or functionality and Anna Munster’s differential relations between embodiment and technics, in which both artist/composer and user become nodes in this interdependent network, satisfying Luciano Floridi’s test of successful observability and backward and forward presence at different Levels of Abstraction.
