= Gene Youngblood =

American media theorist (1942–2021)

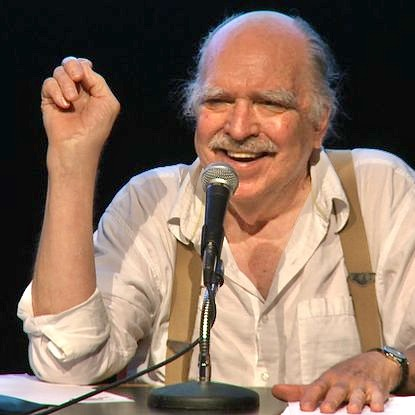
- Youngblood in 2012
- Born: May 30, 1942; Little Rock, Arkansas, U.S.
- Died: April 6, 2021 (aged 78); Santa Fe, New Mexico, U.S.
- Occupation: Film and culture critic; professor of film and video history, media arts, and media democracy
- Spouses: Nancy Marilyn Youngblood (m. 1970; div. 1980) Jane Youngblood (m. 2012)

Gene Youngblood (May 30, 1942 – April 6, 2021) was an American theorist of media arts and politics, and a respected scholar in the history and theory of alternative cinemas. His best-known book, Expanded Cinema, was the first to consider video as an art form. He has been credited with helping to define and legitimate the fields of computer art and digital art.

== Journalism ==
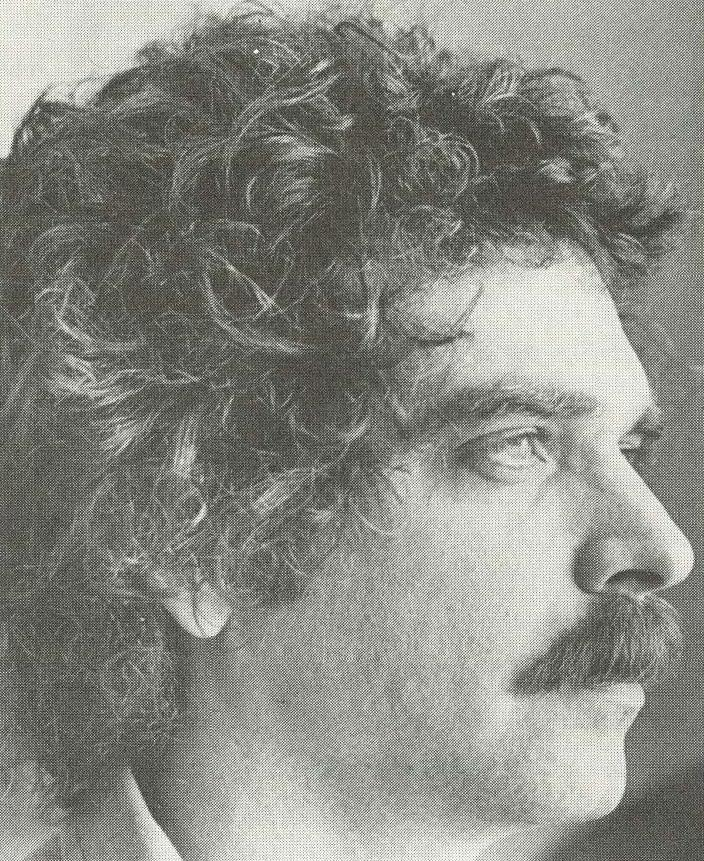
Youngblood circa 1980

For ten years in the 1960s, Gene Youngblood was a journalist for newspapers, television, and radio in Los Angeles. He was a reporter and film critic for the Los Angeles Herald-Examiner (1962–1967), a reporter for KHJ-TV, arts commentator for KPFK, and from 1967 to 1970 he was associate editor and columnist for the Los Angeles Free Press, the first and largest of the underground newspapers of that era.

He is also known for his pioneering work in the media democracy movement, a subject on which he taught, wrote, and lectured, beginning in 1967.

== Academia ==
Youngblood has held several academic posts in his career, but is best known for his time with the Film/Video School at California Institute of the Arts and for helping to found the Moving Image Arts department at the College of Santa Fe.

== Bibliography ==
- Youngblood, Gene. Secession From the Broadcast / Secesión del broadcast. Jean-Jacques Martinod, ed. Los Cerrillos, NM: Evidence House, 2020. English + Spanish Print.
- Youngblood, Gene and R. Buckminster Fuller. Expanded Cinema., 2020. Fordham University 50th Anniversary edition. Print.
- Youngblood, G. "Secession from the Broadcast: the Internet and the Crisis of Social Control." Millennium Film Journal. (2013): 174–189. Print.
- Youngblood, Gene, Pier L. Capucci, and Simonetta Fadda. Expanded Cinema. Bologna: CLUEB, 2013. Italian edition of Expanded Cinema. Print.
- Youngblood, Gene. Cine Expandido. Buenos Aires: EDUNTREF, Editorial De La Universidad Nacional De Tres De Febrero, 2012. Spanish edition of Expanded Cinema. Print.
- Vasulka, Steina. Steina. Santa Fe, N.M: SITE Santa Fe, 2008. Intw. by Gene Youngblood. Print.
- Shaw, Jeffrey, Peter Weibel and Gene Youngblood. "Cinema and the Code," Future Cinema: The Cinematic Imaginary After Film. Cambridge, Mass: MIT Press, 2003. Print.
- Godard, Jean-Luc, and David Sterritt. Jean-Luc Godard: Interviews. Jackson: University Press of Mississippi, 1998. Print.
- Youngblood, Gene. Metaphysical Structuralism: The Videotapes of Bill Viola. Santa Monica: Voyager Press, 1986. Print.
- Youngblood, Gene. "The Redemption of the Amateur," L.A. Weekly, Dec. 13–19, 1985, Vol. 8 No. 3. Los Angeles: Stern Pub, 1978. Internet resource.
- Youngblood, Gene. "Virtual Space: The Electronic Environments of Mobile Image" Is Journal. Los Angeles, CA: International Synergy, 1986. Print.
- Youngblood, Gene. "The Mass Media and the Future of Desire," Coevolution Quarterly: No. 16. Sausalito, CA: Point, 1977. Print.
- Youngblood, Gene. Expanded Cinema. Introd. by R.. Buckminster Fuller. New York: Dutton, 1970. Print.
- Youngblood, Gene. "The Videosphere," Radical Software, Vol. 1, No. 1. New York: Gordon and Breach, Science Publishers, 1970. Internet resource.
- Youngblood, Gene. World Game. Carbondale, Illinois: Southern Illinois University Press, 1970. Print.
