= György Kepes =

Hungarian-American artist (1906–2001)

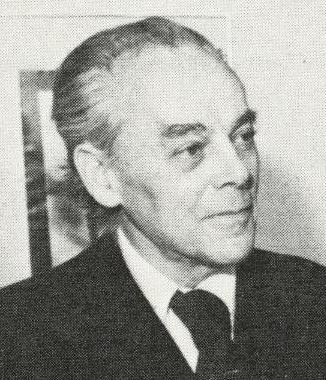
- Kepes in 1982
- Born: October 4, 1906; Selyp, Kingdom of Hungary
- Died: December 29, 2001 (aged 95); Cambridge, Massachusetts, U.S.
- Resting place: Mt. Auburn Cemetery, Cambridge, Massachusetts
- Education: Royal Academy of Fine Arts
- Known for: Painter; photographer; designer; educator; art theorist
- Notable work: Language of Vision
- Spouse: Juliet Appleby
- Elected: National Academy of Design

György Kepes (Hungarian: [ˈkɛpɛʒ ˈɟørɟ]; October 4, 1906 – December 29, 2001) was a Hungarian-born painter, photographer, designer, educator, and art theorist. After immigrating to the U.S. in 1937, he taught design at the New Bauhaus (later the School of Design, then Institute of Design, then Illinois Institute of Design or IIT) in Chicago. In 1967 he founded the Center for Advanced Visual Studies at the Massachusetts Institute of Technology (MIT) where he taught until his retirement in 1974.

== Early years ==
Kepes was born in Selyp, Hungary. His younger brother was Imre Kepes, an ambassador in Argentina, father of András Kepes, journalist, documentary filmmaker and author. His distinguished Jewish family included Gyula Kepes, doctor and polar explorer. At age 18, he enrolled at the Royal Academy of Fine Arts in Budapest, where he studied for four years with István Csók, a Hungarian impressionist painter. In the same period, he was also influenced by the socialist avant-garde poet and painter Lajos Kassak, and began to search for means by which he could contribute to the alleviation of social injustice, especially (as he later recalled) "the inhumane conditions of the Hungarian peasantry."

== Berlin and London ==
Kepes gave up painting temporarily and turned instead to filmmaking. In 1930, he settled in Berlin, where he worked as a publication, exhibition and stage designer. Around this time, he designed the dust jacket for Gestalt psychologist Rudolf Arnheim's famous book, Film als Kunst (Film as Art), one of the first published books on film theory. In Berlin, he was also invited to join the design studio of László Moholy-Nagy, the Hungarian photographer who had taught at the Dessau Bauhaus. When, in 1936, Moholy relocated his design studio to London, Kepes joined him there as well.

== New Bauhaus ==
A fortunate consequence of moving to London was that Kepes found his future wife, a 17-year-old British woman née Juliet Appleby, an artist and illustrator. By chance, he saw her on the street, introduced himself, and soon the two began to date. The following year, when Moholy agreed to become the director of a new art school in Chicago (which Moholy dubbed the New Bauhaus), Kepes was invited to join the faculty and to head a curricular area in Light and Color. Kepes asked Juliet to join him. While teaching at the Institute of Design (or New Bauhaus) from 1937 to 1943, Kepes enlarged and refined his ideas about design theory, form in relation to function, and (his own term) the "education of vision." Kepes was lured to Brooklyn College by Russian-born architect Serge Chermayeff, who had been appointed chair of the Art Department in 1942. There he taught graphic artists such as Saul Bass.

In 1944, he published Language of Vision, an influential book about design and design education. Widely used for many years as a college textbook (it had thirteen printings, in four languages), it began by acknowledging Kepes' indebtedness to the Berlin-based Gestalt psychologists, and by asserting that "Visual communication is universal and international; it knows no limits of tongue, vocabulary, or grammar, and it can be perceived by the illiterate as well as by the literate… [The visual arts, as] the optimum forms of the language of vision, are, therefore, an invaluable educational medium" (p. 13). In part, the book was important because it predated three other influential texts on the same subject: Paul Rand, Thoughts on Design (1946), László Moholy-Nagy, Vision in Motion (1947), and Rudolf Arnheim, Art and Visual Perception (1954).

In 1942, Kepes had been one of a number of people (Moholy was another) who were asked by the U.S. Army to offer advice on military and civilian urban camouflage, in the course of which he viewed Chicago from the air. He alluded to this experience in Language of Vision, when he talked about natural camouflage: "The numerous optical devices which nature employs in the animal world to conceal animals from their enemies reveal the workings of this law [i.e., perceptual grouping] of visual organization" (p. 45).

== Years at MIT ==
In 1947, Kepes accepted an invitation from the School of Architecture and Planning at MIT to initiate a program there in visual design, a division that later became the Center for Advanced Visual Studies (c. 1968). He served as a director of this center until 1972.

Some of the center's early fellows included artists Otto Piene, Panayiotis Vassilakis, Jack Burnham, Wen-Ying Tsai, Stan Vanderbeek, Maryanne Amacher, Joan Brigham, Lowry Burgess, Peter Campus, Muriel Cooper, Douglas Davis, Susan Gamble, Dieter Jung, Piotr Kowalski, Charlotte Moorman, Antoni Muntadas, Yvonne Rainer, Keiko Prince, Alan Sonfist, Aldo Tambellini, Joe Davis, Bill Seaman, Tamiko Thiel, Alejandro Sina, Don Ritter, Luc Courchesne, Jonathan Goldman, and Bill Parker.

While teaching at MIT (where he remained until his retirement in 1974), Kepes was in contact with a wide assortment of artists, designers, architects and scientists, among them Pietro Belluschi, Norbert Wiener, Buckminster Fuller, Rudolf Arnheim, Marcel Breuer, Charles Eames, Erik Erikson, Walter Gropius, Maurice K Smith, and Jerome Wiesner. His own art having moved toward abstract painting, he developed a parallel interest in new scientific imagery, in part because it too had grown increasing "abstract." In 1956, what began as an exhibition became a highly unusual book, The New Landscape in Art and Science, in which Modern-era artwork was paired with scientific images that were made, not with the unaided eye, but with such then "high tech" devices as x-ray machines, stroboscopic photography, electron microscopes, sonar, radar, high-powered telescopes, infrared sensors and so on. His theories on visual perception and, particularly, his personal mentorship, had a profound influence on young MIT architecture, planning, and visual art students. These include Kevin Lynch (The Image of the city) and Maurice K Smith (Associative Form and Field theory).

Kepes and his wife Juliet Appleby Kepes are memorialized at Mt. Auburn Cemetery in Cambridge, Massachusetts, where Kepes died in 2001. The markers are of wood and stone, respectively, and are tall and rectangular in proportion. The Friends of Mt. Auburn provide further information about the stones and the design that was made by grandson Janos Stone.

== Vision + Value ==
In 1965–66, Kepes edited a set of six anthologies, published as a series called the Vision + Value Series. Each volume contained more than 200 pages of essays by some of the most prominent artists, designers, architects and scientists of the time. The richness of the volumes is reflected in their titles: The Education of Vision; Structure in Art and Science; The Nature and Art of Motion; Module, Symmetry, Proportion, Rhythm; Sign, Image, Symbol; and The Man-Made Object.

In his lifetime, Kepes produced other books of lasting importance, among them Graphic Forms: Art as Related to the Book (1949); Arts of Environment (1972); and The Visual Arts Today (1960). He was also a prolific painter and photographer, and his work is in major collections. In recognition of his achievements, there is a Kepes Visual Centre in Eger, Hungary. In 1973 he was elected into the National Academy of Design as an Associate member and became a full academician in 1978.

== Writings ==
- Language of Vision. Chicago: Paul Theobald, 1944. Reissued: New York: Dover Publications, 1995. ISBN 0-486-28650-9.
- Graphic Forms: The Arts as Related to the Book. Cambridge MA: Harvard University Press, 1949.
- The New Landscape in Art and Science. Chicago: Paul Theobald, 1956.
- Vision + Value Series, including The Education of Vision. Structure in Art and Science. The Nature and Art of Motion. Module, Symmetry, Proportion, Rhythm. Sign, Image, Symbol. The Man-Made Object. New York: George Braziller, 1965–66.
- The Visual Arts Today. Wesleyan University Press, 1966.
- The Lost Pageantry of Nature. Artscanada, pages 33–39, Dec 1968.
- Arts of Environment. New York: George Braziller, 1972.
- György Kepes: The MIT Years 1945–77. Cambridge MA: MIT Press, 1978.
- György Kepes, Lucian Bernard, and Ivan Chermayeff. The 60th Art Directors Annual. New York: ADC Publications, 1981

== See also ==
- Rudolf Arnheim
- László Moholy-Nagy
- Kevin A. Lynch
- IIT Institute of Design
