= Wen-Ying Tsai =

American sculptor

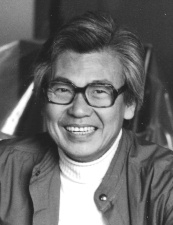
- Tsai in the 1970s
- Born: Wen-Ying Tsai; October 13, 1928; Xiamen, China
- Died: January 2, 2013 (aged 84); Manhattan, New York City, US
- Education: University of Michigan; Art Students League; New School for Social Research
- Known for: Sculpture, Cybernetic art, Kinetic art, Interactive art
- Notable work: US Patent #4,265,402 (for Upward Falling Fountain); Japan Patent #1299159 (for Strobe Liquid Display Device)
- Movement: Art, Science, and Technology
- Awards: John Hay Whitney Fellowship for Painting, 1963; Edward MacDowell Fellowship, 1965; Second Prize, Experiments in Art and Technology (E.A.T.), Museum of Modern Art, New York, 1968; Fellow, Center for Advanced Visual Studies, Massachusetts Institute of Technology, 1968-1971; Best Fine Art in Steel, American Iron and Steel Institute, 1971; ARTEC Grand Prix, Second International Biennale, Nagoya, Japan, 1991; Alumni Merit Award, University of Michigan, 2001.
- Patrons: Howard Wise Gallery, Denise René Gallery, David Bermant Foundation, Lee & Betsy Turner

WEN-YING TSAI (Chinese: 蔡文穎; pinyin: Cài Wényǐng; Wade–Giles: Ts'ai Wen-ying; October 13, 1928 – January 2, 2013) was a Chinese-American artist, best known as a pioneer in the field of cybernetic and kinetic sculpture. Tsai was an early adopter of an extensive array of innovative materials, such as, but not limited to, Day-Glo pigment, LED lights, fiberglass rods, electric motors, stainless steel rods, stroboscopic light, and audio feedback control. As one of the first Chinese-born artists to achieve international recognition in the 1960s, Tsai was an inspiration to generations of Chinese artists around the world.

The philosopher Vilem Flusser wrote of Tsai's work:

There can be no doubt that Tsai is a great artist. Not because what he does is pleasant, or because he proposes a play, or because he represents the spirit of our times, but because he reveals to us, through artifice or works of art, the concrete experience of a future full of promise or abysmal danger.

== Early life and education ==
Wen-Ying Tsai was born in 1928 in Xiamen, Fujian, China. He grew up in the Nanjing Decade, a period of economic and civil strife. In 1939, he moved to Shanghai, to study chemical engineering at Ta Tung University. In 1949, he moved to Hong Kong before moving to the United States in 1950. He attended the University of Michigan, receiving a bachelor's degree in Mechanical Engineering (BSME) in 1953.

== Engineering Career ==
After graduating from the University of Michigan, Tsai moved to New York to work as an architectural engineer. He worked for a number of acclaimed clients such as Walter Gropius, Mies van der Rohe, Synergetics, and Skidmore, Owings and Merrill. Working as an engineer by day, Tsai explored other interests by taking courses at night. He pursued artistic studies at the Art Students League, took courses in political science and economics at the New School for Social Research, and attended modern dance classes with Erick Hawkins.

== Early Career as an Artist ==
Tsai pivoted away from engineering and devoted himself to art in 1963 when he was awarded the 1963 John Hay Whitney Fellowship Grant for Painting for two abstract works, Untitled I and Untitled II. In this period of renewed commitment to his art, Tsai was inspired by Op Art and began to incorporate optical effects, in his painting. This prompted him to use fluorescent, Day-Glo pigments, accompanied by ultra-violet light, in his works, making him the first artist to incorporate the material into paintings. In addition to the fluorescent pigments, Tsai also began to create perceptual effects by layering materials, as seen in his painting Random Field, which utilizes a layer of perforated bakelite, a synthetic plastic, over canvas. Random Field was included in the seminal Museum of Modern Art exhibition, The Responsive Eye, in 1965.

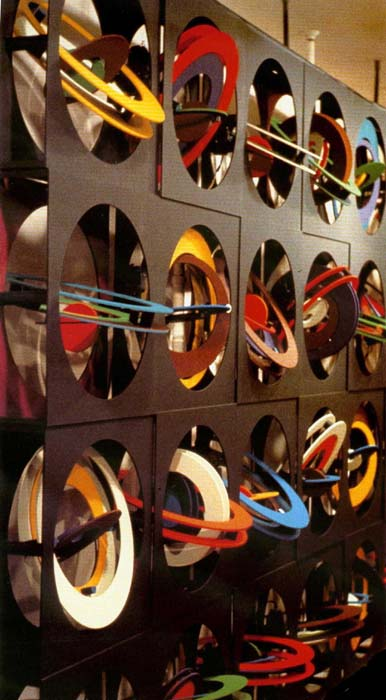
Multikinetic Wall (1965)

It was also in 1965 that Tsai first incorporated motors into his work to create kinetic sculpture. His first kinetic sculpture was titled Multi-Kinetic Wall, which was exhibited at the Amel Gallery (New York) and at the Institute of Contemporary Art, Boston. Made up of 32 individual units, each unit consisted of multiple gyroscopic forms painted in Day-Glo pigments. Each unit was independently motorized and could be operated individually. Art historian Sam Hunter described the work:

Tsai's Multi-kinetics were dynamically integrated multiple constructions, employing thirty-two kinetic units, each of which contains a configuration of multi-colored gyroscopic forms. With these elements he created an active environmental field that could, apparently, be infinitely extended. Each motorized unit was a self-sufficient entity, and when it was combined with other similar units produced a large-scale kinetic work that joined visual intensity with mechanical power. By controlling the time sequence of each unit in skillful compositions, Tsai used engineering principles to achieve aesthetic ends.

1965 continued to be an important year for Tsai. He had a "Eureka" moment while on a fellowship at the Edward MacDowell Colony in Peterborough, New Hampshire. While contemplating the sunlight shimmering in the trees, he had a sudden inspiration to use his engineering background to create art work that could replicate natural phenomena, such as the effect of light. Tsai found a starting point in the kinetic work of constructivist artist Naum Gabo and evoked the shimmering light with a stroboscope, but he decided that "the shimmering was not enough." He worked to find a way that the viewer could interact directly with the work of art. This pursuit led him to a major innovation: the use of a feedback control system. With the feedback control system, the sculpture responded to viewer-created noise with harmonic vibration.

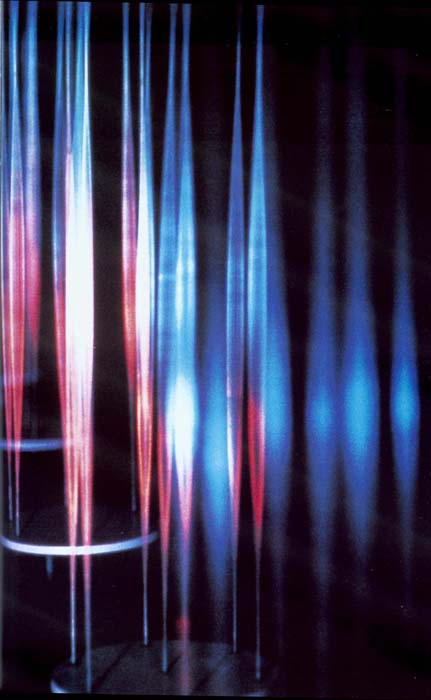
Cybernetic Sculpture System No. 1 (1968)

These first "feedback" pieces were shown at Howard Wise Gallery in New York in 1968 at an important show titled Cybernetic Sculpture. This solo exhibition featured a number of vibrating artworks made of stainless steel rods and polished metallic plates, as well as a number of his experiments with stroboscopic lights and audio feedback control. Art critic Robert Hughes evokes them vividly:

A grove of slender stainless-steel rods rises from a plate. This base vibrates at 30 cycles per second; the rods flex rapidly, in harmonic curves. The rods appear to move; there is a shimmering, a flashing, an eerie ballet of metal, whose apparent movements range from stillness to jittering, and back to a slow, indescribably sensuous undulation

Jonathan Benthall was one of the first to appreciate Tsai's sculpture. In 1968, he wrote:

The work of art may be regarded as a machine programmed by the artist to produce a deferred output. That is why an artist like Tsai is likely to be so valuable; not because he is an innovator (all his techniques taken separately have been used before) but because he has the kind of authority that establishes a stylistic tradition.

Later that year, one of these cybernetic works, Cybernetic Sculpture System No. 1, won the second prize in an E.A.T. (Experiments in Art and Technology) competition. The same work was included in the mammoth international exhibition Machine as Seen at the End of the Mechanical Age, guest curated by Pontus Hultén for the Museum of Modern Art in New York. Inclusion in Hultén's exhibition was an incredibly important moment for Tsai's career, not only in terms of art world recognition, but in revealing the inequities of the art world. In response to an incident at Machine as Seen at the End of the Mechanical Age, Tsai and a number of other artists, including Takis, founded the Art Workers' Coalition, a coalition of artists that sought to implement museum reform and underscore "issues relating to the political and social responsibility of the art community."

Another breakthrough moment in Tsai's career came in 1968 when Tsai was invited by György Kepes to the Center for Advanced Visual Studies at MIT. Tsai was one of the "first Fellows", a lively group of like-minded artists (including Jack Burnham, Otto Piene, Takis, Harold Tovish, Stan VanDerBeek). Tsai met Harold "Doc" Edgerton, the engineer who developed the modern electronic stroboscope. Tsai remained at MIT CAVS until 1971.

== Mid-Late Career ==
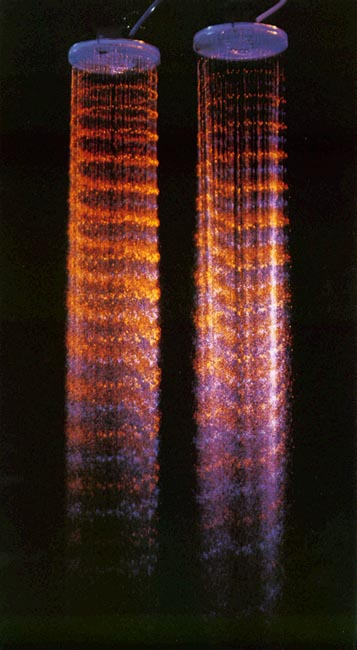
Upward Falling Fountain, 1979

In the early 1970s, Tsai moved with his family to Paris and showed with the Denise René Gallery and had extensive exhibitions in Europe. He continued to innovate in his practice, introducing new elements into his sculptures. One of the most important works of this era was Upward Falling Fountain (1979), which created the illusion of water droplets rising upward in response to viewer-created sound. By attaching a fountainhead he designed to a motor suspended from the ceiling, Tsai created using stroboscopic light the illusion of a slow-moving, spiral column of water; with audio feedback control, a viewer could then make the water droplets rise upwards by simply clapping, yelling, or stomping. Tsai's use of audio feedback evolved in relation to his use of light sources. Interactive sound-controlled works coupled his audio feedback control units with neon transformers and LED lights.

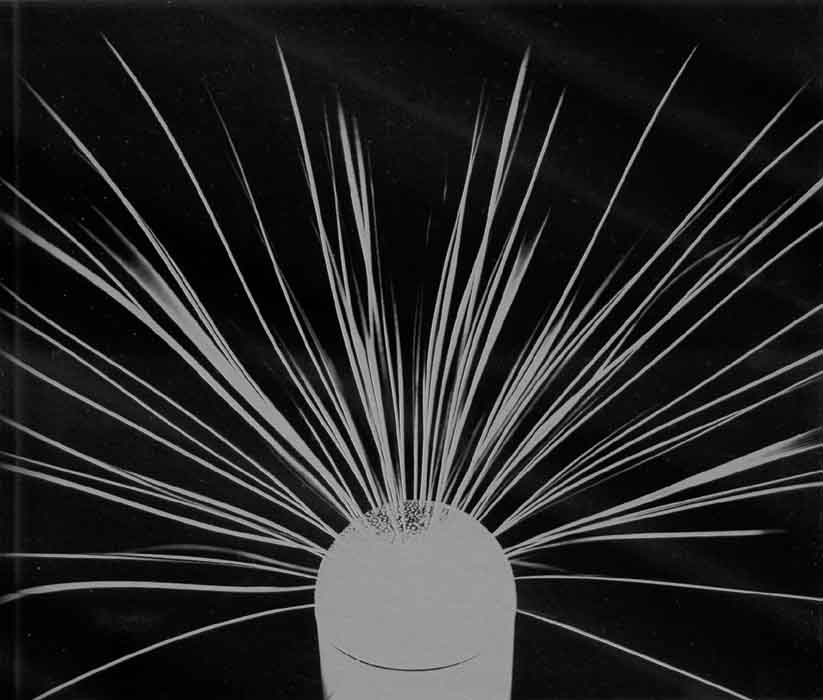
Semisphere (1972)

In the 1980s, Tsai began to create computer controlled works. The first of these, Computer Column (1980), was controlled by a program that controlled a number of flap units, recycled from defunct train or airport announcement boards. The flap units were painted in Day-Glo colors and flipped to reveal choreographed patterns and create a rhythmic sound. Other computer-programmed works created choreographed patterns using a variety of light sources.

Tsai received multiple public commissions, which prompted him to take on more architectural work. He designed large fountains for Hong Kong’s Landmark Building and Singapore’s Raffles Tower. When IBM commissioned a work for an exhibition entitled “Computers and Art,” Tsai took inspiration from the computer programs of his flap unit and light-based works, programming water pumps to dance to music.

Tsai participated in a number of groundbreaking exhibitions in this period of his career. One of these was Frank Popper's Electra exhibition. Popper writes in his "Electra" exhibition catalog about Tsai's essential contribution:

The role played by Tsai, the American artist of Chinese origin, in this context cannot be overestimated, in his most varied cybernetic sculptures in the Electra exhibition are perfect examples of an artistic comment, perhaps an artistic solution to one of the principal problems raised in this show: the situation of the artist between technology, at a critical point of its passage from the mechanical to the electronic era, and man's natural or artificial environment...

Another time, Popper elaborated:

As far as the sensory experience of the spectator goes, the most outstanding American kinetic artist is unquestionably the Chinese-born Wen-Ying Tsai. His pieces, which are perfect on the technological level, spontaneous celebration' which is re-created in their presence. As he concludes: 'Rhythm is friendship and in Tsai's work there is friendship of light, sound and our own heart-beats.

Throughout his career, Tsai remained devoted to the motorized sculptures that launched him to the forefront of the cybernetic vanguard. At the end of his career, he returned to his work with rods. Tsai’s later works gathered rods of different sizes, materials, and forms and resembled bouquets of flowers.

== Personal life ==
Tsai met his wife, Pei-De Chang, in New York City in 1967. They were married in London in 1968 during the Cybernetic Serendipity exhibition in which Tsai participated. The couple had twin sons two years later when Tsai was a Fellow at the Center for Advanced Visual Studies at MIT; their friend Otto Piene was fond of recalling that the Tsai twins were the first of the "Center babies".

The Tsai family spent part of the 1970s in Paris before settling down permanently in SoHo, New York where they lived in a loft space that they renovated themselves. Richard Kostelanetz has written about the Tsais in SoHo in his book SoHo: The Rise and Fall of an Artists' Colony.

== Death ==
Tsai died in Manhattan, New York, on January 2, 2013. He was survived by his wife Pei-De; sons and spouses Lun-Yi London (Michelle) and Ming-Yi György (Marloes); grandchildren Sakhaya, Kelsyn, Lina, Flora and Nereus. Artist Otto Piene and composer Wen-chung Chou were among those who spoke at Tsai's funeral service.

== Legacy ==
While living in Paris, Tsai befriended fellow Chinese artists including Peng Wen-Ts and Chu Teh-Chun and became passionate about cultural exchange between China and the West. In 1979, Tsai and his friend, composer Wen-chung Chou, were part of the first delegation of artists from the US to the People's Republic of China. This eventually lead Tsai and his wife Pei-De to establish The Committee for Chinese Artists Intercultural Movement (CCAIM), a pioneering non-profit organization that brought mainland Chinese artists to exhibit in the United States in the 1980s.

Tsai and Pei-De founded the Tsai Art and Science Foundation in 2006 to promote endeavors at the intersection of the arts and sciences. The Foundation now increases public awareness of Tsai’s work and place in art history and handles the conservation of Tsai’s works.

== Collections ==
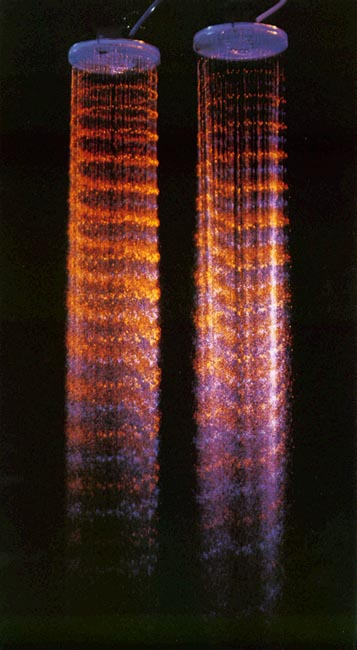
Upward Falling Fountain (1979)

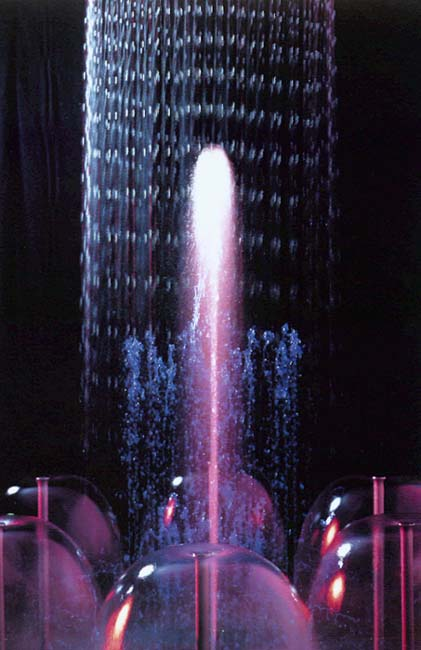
Living Fountain at IBM Gallery, New York (1988)

- Addison Gallery of American Art, Andover, Massachusetts
- Albright-Knox Art Gallery, Buffalo, New York
- Butler Institute of American Art, Youngstown, Ohio
- Centre National des Arts Plastiques, Paris, France
- Centre Pompidou, Paris, France
- Chrysler Museum of Art, Provincetown, Massachusetts
- David Bermant Foundation, California
- Franklin Institute, Philadelphia, Pennsylvania
- Great Explorations, St. Petersburg, Florida
- MIT List Visual Arts Center, Massachusetts Institute of Technology
- Israel Museum, Jerusalem
- Kaiser Wilhelm Museum, Krefeld, Germany
- Kanagawa Science Park, Kanagawa Prefecture, Japan
- Kunsthalle Nuremberg, Germany
- Lannon Foundation, California
- Malcolm Forbes Foundation, New York
- Memorial Art Gallery, Rochester, New York
- Musée d'Art Moderne de la Ville de Paris
- Museo de Arte Contemporaneo de Caracas, Venezuela
- Museum für Holographie, Pulheim/Köln, Germany
- Princeton University Art Museum, Princeton University, New Jersey
- Museo de Bellas Artes, Caracas, Venezuela
- Nagoya City Art Museum, Nagoya, Japan
- National Taiwan Museum of Fine Arts, Taichung, Taiwan
- Oklahoma City Museum of Art, Oklahoma
- Ontario Science Center, Toronto
- Orlando Science Center, Orlando, Florida
- Shirahama Energy Land, Matsushita Electric Co. (Panasonic), Shirahama, Japan
- Tate Gallery, London
- University of Alberta Museums, Canada
- Whitney Museum of American Art, New York City

== Selected exhibitions ==
=== Solo ===
1961 Ruth Sherman Gallery, New York

1964 & 1965 Amel Gallery, New York

1968 Howard Wise Gallery, New York

1970 Alpha Gallery
Museum Haus Lange, Krefeld, Germany

1971 Hayden Gallery, Massachusetts Institute of Technology
Ontario Science Center, Toronto
Galérie Françoise Mayer, Brussels
University of Pittsburgh
Michael Berger Gallery, Pittsburgh, PA

1972 Galérie Denise René, Paris
Corcoran Gallery of Art, Washington, DC
Galérie Denise René, New York

1973 Galérie Denise René/Hans Mayer, Düsseldorf.
Musee d'Art Contemporain, Montreal.

1975 Museo de Arte Contemporaneo de Caracas, Venezuela.

1978 Wildenstein Art Center, Houston.
Museo de Bellas Artes, Caracas.

1979 Hong Kong Museum of Art.

1980 Isetan Museum of Art, Tokyo.

1983 Galerie Denise Rene, Paris.

1989 National Museum of History, Taipei.

1990 Taiwan Museum of Art, Taichung, Taiwan.

1997 National Museum of China, Beijing, China.

=== Group ===
1965
"The Responsive Eye", Museum of Modern Art, New York
"The New Eyes", Chrysler Art Museum, Provincetown, Massachusetts
City Art Museum of St. Louis
"Art in Science", Albany Institute of History and Art
"Art Turned On", Institute of Contemporary Art, Boston.
"Art in Science", organized by Smithsonian Institution, Washington DC
National Academy of Science, Washington, DC

1968
"Cybernetic Serendipity", Institute of Contemporary Arts, London.
"The Machine as Seen at the End of the Mechanical Age", Museum of Modern Art, New York

1969
"Cybernetic Serendipity", Corcoran Gallery of Art, Washington, DC
"Howard Lipman Collection", Whitney Museum of American Art, New York.
"Master Pieces of Modern Art", Galerie Denise Rene/Hans Mayer, Krefeld, Germany.
"Explorations", Hayden Gallery, Massachusetts Institute of Technology
National Collection of Fine Arts, Smithsonian Institution, Washington, DC
3e Salon International des Galeries Pilotes, Cantonal Museum of Fine Arts, Lausanne
Musee d'Art Moderne, Paris.
Pittsburgh International, Museum of Art, Carnegie Institute, Pittsburgh.
"Struktur Schwingung Dynarnik", Kunsthalle, Nuremberg.
"L'Art et les Technologies", Ville de Vitry-sur-Seine, France.
"Multiple Interaction Team", Museum of Science and Industry, Chicago
"Salon International des Composants Electroniques", Paris.
"Custom and Culture", US Custom House, New York.
"Art of the Space Era", Huntsville Museum of Art, Alabama.
"The Expanding Visual World", The Museum of Fun, Asahi Shimbun, Tokyo.

1983
"Electra", Musee d'Art Moderne, Paris.

1984
"Carte Blanche Denise Rene". Paris.

1986
"Les Machines Sentimentales", Avignon.
"La Biennale Di Venezia", Venice.
"Energetic Art", La Malmaison, Cannes.

1987
"Artware, Kunst und Elektronik", Hanover International Fair.
"Artware", Düsseldorf Landsmuseum.
"Art in the Computer Age", Everson Museum of Art, Syracuse, New York.
"Art in the Computer Age", Cincinnati Contemporary Art Center, Cincinnati, Ohio.

1988
"Computers and Art", IBM Gallery of Science and Art, New York.
"Lights OROT", Yeshiva University Museum, New York.
"Interaction", The Aldrich Museum of Contemporary Art, Connecticut.
"Vraiment Faux", La Fondation Cartier, Jouey-en-Jossas, France.
"Art Construit, Lumiere, Mouvement", EPAD, Galerie La Defense, Paris.
"Art in the Computer Age", Center for the Fine Arts, Miami.

1989
"Phenomena Art", Pan-Asian Expo '89, Saibu Gas Museum, Fukuoka, Japan.
KSP, Kawasaka - Kanagawa Prefecture.
"Visiona", Vienna Messe-WienerFestwochen.
"Visiona", Zurich.

1990
"Image du Futur", Montreal, Canada.

1991
"ARTEC '91, The International Biennale in Nagoya", Japan.

1995
"Kwangju International Biennale" in Korea.
"Osaka Triennale 1995" - Sculpture.

2001
"Denise René, l'intrépide", Centre Georges Pompidou, Paris

2008
"Olympic Games, 2008", Beijing

2010
"Expo 2010 Shanghai", Shanghai Art Museum, Shanghai

== See also ==
- Jeff Lieberman (artist engineer)
- Otto Piene
