= Joan Brigham =

American artist (1935–2026)

- Brigham at the Goldring-Piene farm in Groton, Massachusetts on June 2, 2013
- Born: Joan Carroll; January 31, 1935; Tulsa, Oklahoma, U.S.
- Died: July 18, 2026 (aged 91); White River Junction, Vermont, U.S.
- Known for: Steam art
- Movement: Technology art
- Website: joanbrigham.com

Joan Brigham (January 31, 1935 – July 18, 2026) was an American artist, art historian and fellow at the Center for Advanced Visual Studies at the Massachusetts Institute of Technology. She is best known for her steam sculptures.

== Life and career ==
From 1952 to 1956, Joan Brigham studied art history at Pomona College in Claremont, California. In 1965, she earned her master's degree in art history from Harvard University in Cambridge, Massachusetts. Since 1971, she has been on the teaching faculty at Emerson College in Boston, Massachusetts as a professor of Visual and Media Arts.

From 1975 to 1995, she was a fellow at the Center for Advanced Visual Studies (CAVS) at the Massachusetts Institute of Technology. From 1974 to 1993, CAVS was directed by the German artist Otto Piene. Since the 1970s, she has worked primarily with steam, which she uses in walk-in installations, steam-powered objects, and public fountain installations. On several occasions, Brigham collaborated with experimental filmmaker Stan VanDerBeek, who used Brigham's large-scale immersive steam installations as ephemeral projection screens. One of these works, Steam Screens, was exhibited in the Whitney Museum's Sculpture Garden in 1979.

In 1977, Brigham was involved in Centerbeam, CAVS's contribution to documenta 6 in Kassel, Germany. The nearly 40-metre-long (130 ft) sculpture, based on a design by CAVS Fellow and artist Lowry Burgess, combined diverse artistic media such as lasers, holography, video, steam, and inflatables. Centerbeam was the result of an equal collaboration between CAVS Fellows from the fields of art, engineering, and science. The curator of documenta 6, Manfred Schneckenburger, described Centerbeam as an "aqueduct into the 21st century." In 1978, a second version of Centerbeam was displayed on the National Mall in Washington, D.C.

In 1984, Joan Brigham installed the Tanner Fountain on the campus of Harvard University in collaboration with Peter Walker and the SWA Group. The nearly 20-metre-long (66 ft) fountain consists of 159 granite blocks arranged in concentric circles. Fine mist of water escapes the fountain in spring, summer, and fall, while in winter steam from the university's heating system is piped into the fountain and rises in its center.

Brigham continued the legacy of CAVS, collaborating with artists such as Antoni Muntadas and Walter Dent. She traveling globally to interview many former Fellows and graduates. Her archive of interviews became a significant resource for the first history of CAVS by Elizabeth Goldring and Ellen Sebring, CENTERBOOK, published in 2019, available through the MIT Press.

Brigham died on July 18, 2026, at the age of 91.

== Selected works ==
- 1975: Fog, Mist and Dreams, participatory installation with film projections on water vapor in collaboration with Stan VanDerBeek, Arttransition, MIT, Cambridge
- 1976/77: Under Aquarius, participatory multimedia installation of water vapor, projections, sound, in collaboration with Stan VanDerBeek and the American Underwater Band, Alumni Pool MIT, Cambridge
- 1977: Centerbeam I, collective multimedia sculpture by the Fellows of the Center for Advanced Visual Studies, documenta 6, Kassel
- 1977: Day Work/Night Dreams, steam engine with synchronized strobe lights, Avant Garde Festival, World Trade Center, New York
- 1977: Centerbeam II, collective multimedia sculpture by the Fellows of the Center for Advanced Visual Studies, Washington Mall, Washington D.C.
- 1978: Golem: Steam Theatre, multimedia performance in collaboration with Phoenix Dance Theatre; Alan Lazar, Mark Mendel, Mark Ross, Cambridge River Festival
- 1979: Aeolipiles, steam-powered kinetic glass sculptures, Conservatoire National des Arts et Metiers, Paris
- 1979: Steam Screens, participatory installation with film projections on steam in collaboration with Stan VanDerBeek, Sculpture Garden Whitney Museum of American Art, New York
- 1979: Northeast Night Thrasher, installation of steam with synchronized strobe lights, First Night Celebrations, Copley Plaza, Boston
- 1984: Tanner Fountain, in front of Harvard University's Science Center (in collaboration with Peter Walker and the SWA Group)
- 1987: Steamshuffle, participatory installation with steam in collaboration with Christopher Janney and texts by Emmett Williams, Municipal Services Building, Philadelphia
- 1989: Galaxy Fountain: Earth Sphere, Kendall Square, Cambridge Massachusetts (in collaboration with artists Joe Davis and Otto Piene)
