= Gas sculpture =

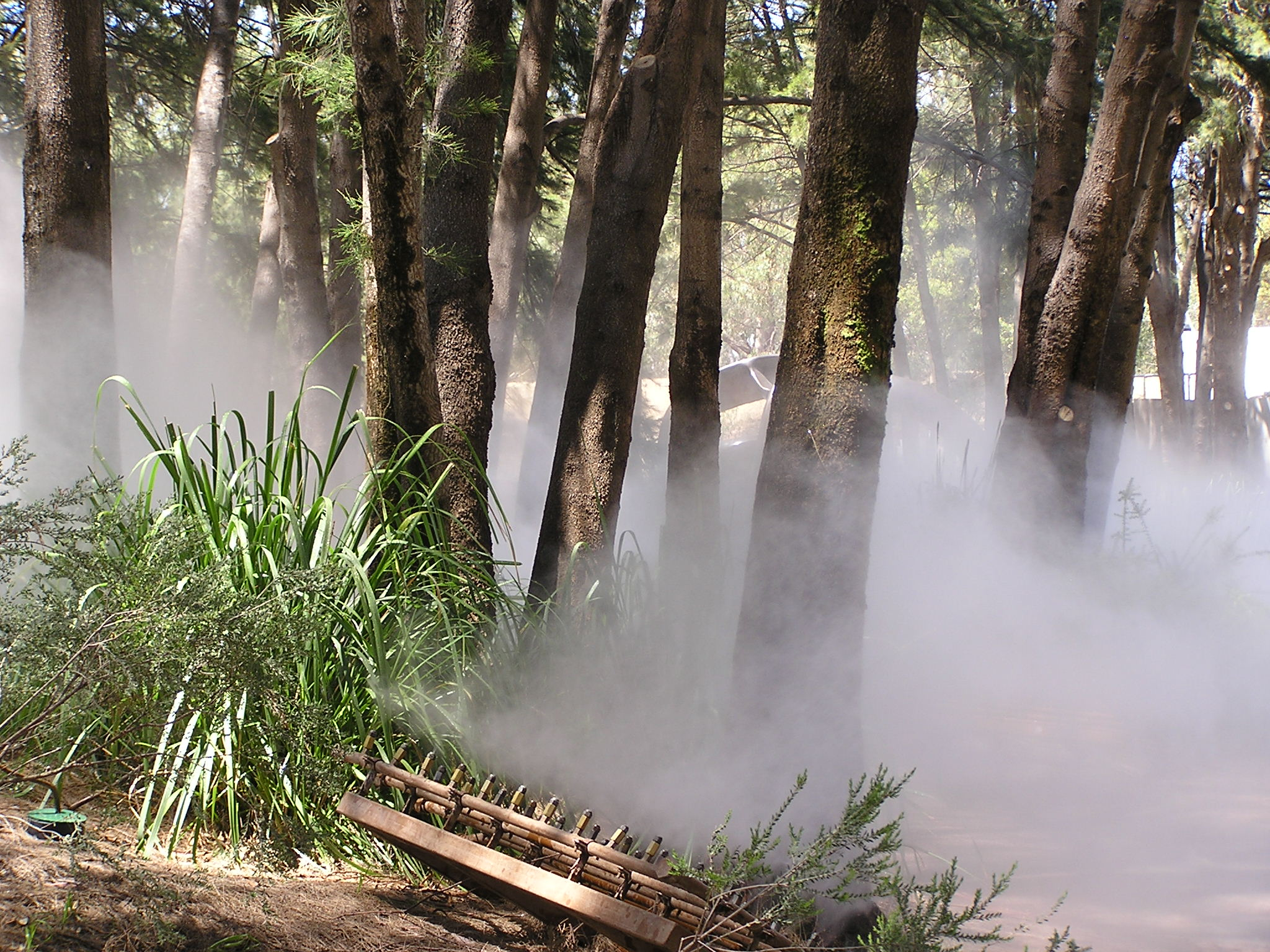
Fog sculpture in the sculpture garden of the National Gallery of Australia in Canberra. Artist is Fujiko Nakaya (born 1933 Japan, daughter of Ukichiro Nakaya). The sculpture was made in 1976 and purchased in 1977.

Gas sculpture is a concept introduced by Joan Miró to make sculptures out of gaseous materials. The idea of a gas sculpture also appeared in the book Gog, by Giovanni Papini (1881–1956).

An example of pure water fog sculpture is in the sculpture garden at the National Gallery of Australia in Canberra. A large bank of very small nozzles is arrayed on the edge of a small rush-filled pond, and when the power is switched on a fine mist of fog billows out. The "sculpture" has a continuously changing shape as it is affected by the water, the rushes, and the air currents in the area.

== Technology ==
Cold water fog nozzle technologies were developed by industry in the late 1960s for factory air particulate control and agricultural orchard freeze prevention. These high pressure systems force filtered water at 1,500 to 3,000 pounds per square inch (10,000–21,000 kPa) through custom nozzles to atomize the water into billions of ultra-fine droplets below 10 micrometres (0.00039 in) in size. In industrial applications this also provides cooling due to rapid evaporation.

Artists use this cold water fog technology to make experimental artworks that allow the viewer to safely interact and become fully immersed in the fog.

High temperature steam fog from underground steam utility lines used for commercial heat transfer, and small boiler sources, are also used by artists for atmospheric visual displays, and as a dynamic projection surfaces.

In the commercial entertainment industry these various water fog systems are used for special effects in movies, and for theme park atmospherics.

Some kinetic sculptures contain other gaseous elements, such as the sculptures of Jean-Paul Riopelle's La Joute, which includes natural gas fire jets, a water fountain, and bronze sculptural elements.

== Contemporary fog sculptures ==
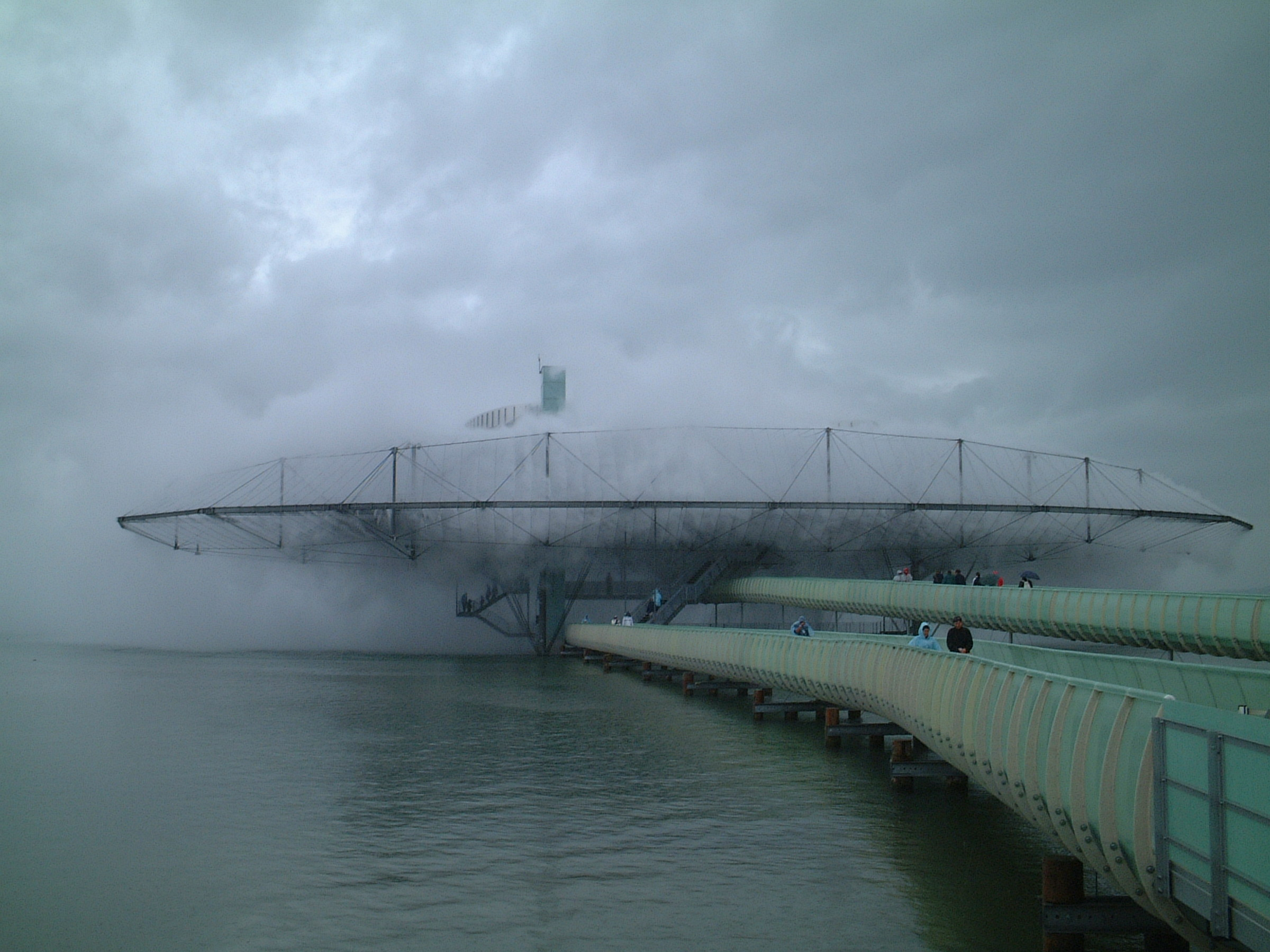
Blur Building

A large scale use of cold water fog is the Blur Building (2002), an exhibition pavilion built for Swiss Expo.02 on Lake Neuchatel by architects Diller Scofidio + Renfro. This is an architecture described as "an inhabitable cloud whirling above a lake", built with an atmosphere of fog surrounding a lightweight tensegrity structure 20 by 60 by 100 metres (66 by 197 by 328 ft).

The primary visible building material is water. Water pumped from the lake is filtered and atomized to a fine mist through an array of 31,400 high-pressure nozzles. The nozzle pressures are regulated by a computer processor and a smart weather system that reads temperature, humidity, wind speed and direction. The fog created is thus in constant change, an interplay of natural and man-made forces.

Two bridges connect the building with the shore, four hundred visitors at a time can enter the building and be within the fog mass. Inside the fog, one's normal spatial references are lost when immersed within an optical “whiteout”, and the “white noise” of hissing nozzles.

Artistic use of steam fog was pioneered in the collaborative Center Beam artwork by the Center for Advanced Visual Studies at MIT. First shown in 1977 at documenta 6 in Kassel, Germany, it included steam works by Joan Brigham, Otto Piene, and Paul Earls. For Center Beam, a low pressure hot water steam fog became a medium to project lasers, holograms, films and text onto.

The Children's Museum of Pittsburgh created a new park with a fog sculpture created by Ned Kahn. Completed in 2012, the sculpture is a 30-by-30-foot (9.1 by 9.1 m) grid of stainless steel poles outfitted with fog nozzles. Kahn said of the sculpture, "When the fog is on, it will appear like a 20-foot-diameter sphere [6.1 m] of fog spinning inside the poles."

In 1998 polish artist Zuzanna Janin did the installation “What a Hell, What a Heaven” in Foksal Gallery in Warsaw, Poland, also in 1999 "Memory" in Center for CONTEMPORARY ART Zamek Ujazdowski in Warsaw, Poland. In 2002 she have done work “Synagogue /Memory” in Center of Contemporary Art (old synagogue building) in Trnava, Slovakia. The work was done from artificial fog used in disco or concerts.

Other contemporary sculptures in which fog is used as a medium of expression are: Harbor Fog, a viewer responsive artwork in the parkland above Boston's Big Dig highway; Cloud RIngs (2006) by Ned Kahn at the 21c Museum Hotel in Louisville, Kentucky; and the interactive landscape of Dilworth Plaza at Philadelphia City Hall (completion date 2013).

== See also ==
- Barrier-grid animation § Kinegram
- DOVIDs, Diffractive optically variable image device
- Lumino kinetic art
- Robotic art
- Sound art
- Sound installation
