= Joe Zane =

American artist

Joe Zane (born 1971 in Utica, New York) is an American artist. His work uses painting, sculpture, video, performance and self-deprecating humour to address the themes of authenticity and the role of the artist. He currently lives in Cambridge, MA and previously worked at the Center for Advanced Visual Studies at MIT.

He has participated in group exhibitions at the List Visual Arts Center (2003), MassMOCA (2009) and the Institute of Contemporary Art, Boston (2005+2008), where he contributed 31 drawings of conceptual artists. For his 2006 solo show at Allston Skirt he exhibited a series of paintings of famous art forgers.

In 2008 he was shortlisted for the James and Audrey Foster Prize, awarded by the Institute of Contemporary Art, Boston to support artists working in the Boston area. In 2009, Zane was awarded the top award from Artadia 2009 Boston Award cycle.
