= Isabel Bolton =

American novelist

Mary Britton Miller (6 August 1883 – 3 April 1975), best known by her pen name as Isabel Bolton, was an American poet and novelist. She achieved her greatest critical success with the publication of three novels after the age of sixty, under her pen name. Many Mansions (1952) was nominated for the National Book Award for Fiction. She produced five books between the ages of 63 and 87, dictating them because of failing eyesight.

== Early life and education ==
Born in New London, Connecticut, to Charles P. Miller, a lawyer, and Grace Rumrill, she and her identical twin sister, Grace, were the youngest of five children, following two older brothers and an older sister. The family lived in a mansion in New York City, where their father was a prominent lawyer. They summered in New London, Connecticut with members of Grace's family. When Mary and her twin were four years old, their parents died of cholera in Connecticut within a few days of each other. (Another source says pneumonia.)

Their mother's brother, James Rumrill, had married Anna Chapin and through her family, became a vice-president of the Boston-Albany Railroad. He found that their father had left debt rather than wealth. Initially the orphaned children lived with their maternal grandmother Rebecca Rumrill in Springfield, Massachusetts, but she was in her 70s and died after two years. James and Anna Rumrill, who also lived there, assumed guardianship, but Anna kept the children at a remove. She hired Desire Aurelia Rogers to care for them. Rogers and the children lived in a separate residence. Their lives were unstable and the children felt like the poor relations they were. The five were raised largely in Springfield.

In 1897 the twins were staying for the summer with family friends at Quogue on the South Shore of Long Island. The twin sisters were out in a rowboat and got caught in a current; the boat overturned and Grace drowned at the age of fourteen.

Mary Britton Miller later was educated at a girls school and lived for a time in Europe with her cousin Marguerite Chapin, who married there (she was the Marguerite Caetani of the literary magazine Bottege Oscure). When Miller returned to the United States at the age of 28, she settled in New York City. She lived for decades in Greenwich Village until her death in 1975.

== Writing career ==
Beginning with her first book of poetry published in 1928, when she was forty-five, Miller first became known as a writer of poetry for children and adults. She published books under her birth name of Mary Britton Miller for many years.

In 1943, when she was sixty, she published her first novel, In the Days of Thy Youth, in which she explored her life in the years between her parents' deaths and that of her twin sister. Reviewers mistakenly likened this work to much more light-hearted books.

Because of failing eyesight, she had to dictate her last five books, written between the ages of 63 and 87. She adopted the pen name Isabel Bolton for her novel Do I Wake or Sleep (1946), and it received marked positive attention from noted literary critics Edmund Wilson and Diana Trilling. It was praised as "one of the best novels of the decade." Trilling said she was among the best “woman writer[s] of fiction in this country today.”

This novel was followed by her The Christmas Tree in 1949. Her novel Many Mansions (1952) was nominated for the National Book Award for Fiction. But by then some critics were passing her by. In each of these novels she explored her and her twin sister's lives through fiction.

These three novels, under her pen name Isabel Bolton, were republished posthumously in 1997 in a collection called New York Mosaic.

== Books ==
- As Mary Britton Miller:
  - Songs of Infancy and Other Poems (Macmillan, 1928), poetry
  - Menagerie (Macmillan, 1928), children's poetry
  - Without Sanctuary (Macmillan, 1932), poetry
  - Intrepid Bird (Macmillan, 1934), poetry
  - In the Days of Thy Youth (Scribner, 1943), novel
  - The Crucifixion: A Poem (Scribner, 1944), poetry
  - Give a Guess: Poems (Pantheon, 1957), children's poetry, illustrated by Juliet Kepes
  - All Aboard: Poems (Pantheon, 1958), children's poetry, illustrated by Bill Sokol
  - A Handful of Flowers (Pantheon, 1959), children's poetry, illustrated by Genevieve Vaughan-Jackson
  - Jungle Journey (Pantheon, 1959), children's poetry, illustrated by Tobias Schneebaum
  - Listen—the Birds (Pantheon, 1961), children's poetry, illustrated by Evaline Ness
- As Isabel Bolton:
  - Do I Wake or Sleep (Scribner, 1946)
  - The Christmas Tree (Scribner, 1949)
  - Many Mansions (Scribner, 1952)
  - Under Gemini: A Memoir (Harcourt Brace, 1966)
  - The Whirligig of Time (Crown Publishers, 1971)
  - New York Mosaic (Steerforth Press, 1997), posthumous collection of Do I Wake or Sleep, The Christmas Tree, and Many Mansions

== Legacy ==
The Millers' father Charles had to overcome his own father, Ezra L. Miller, committing suicide in 1847. He seemed to have done so, especially with his marriage. But the losses of their parents and security in their early years seemed to affect all the Miller children.

The elder Miller children also struggled as adults. Philip, the eldest, became a lawyer and eventually joined a prominent firm. Rebecca married a doctor and lived in Canada for several years. After they moved to New York in the 1920s, where her husband Edward Farrell joined a medical faculty, he became ill and died. Rebecca suffered from extreme depression and died a few years later at a home for incurables. Their youngest brother James had some opportunities with the Chapin family and became a bank president, but he suffered a breakdown and committed suicide in 1916 at Butler Hospital, a sanitarium in Providence, Rhode Island. He shot himself in the head with a revolver as his grandfather Miller had done.

Mary/Bolton never married and continued to explore elements of her life through her novels. In 1943, the year she published her first novel, her surviving brother Philip died of a heart attack at work.
