= Shanken =

Shanken is a surname. Notable people with the surname include:

- Edward A. Shanken (born 1964), American art historian
- Marvin Shanken (born 1943), American publisher
