= MIT Program in Art, Culture and Technology =

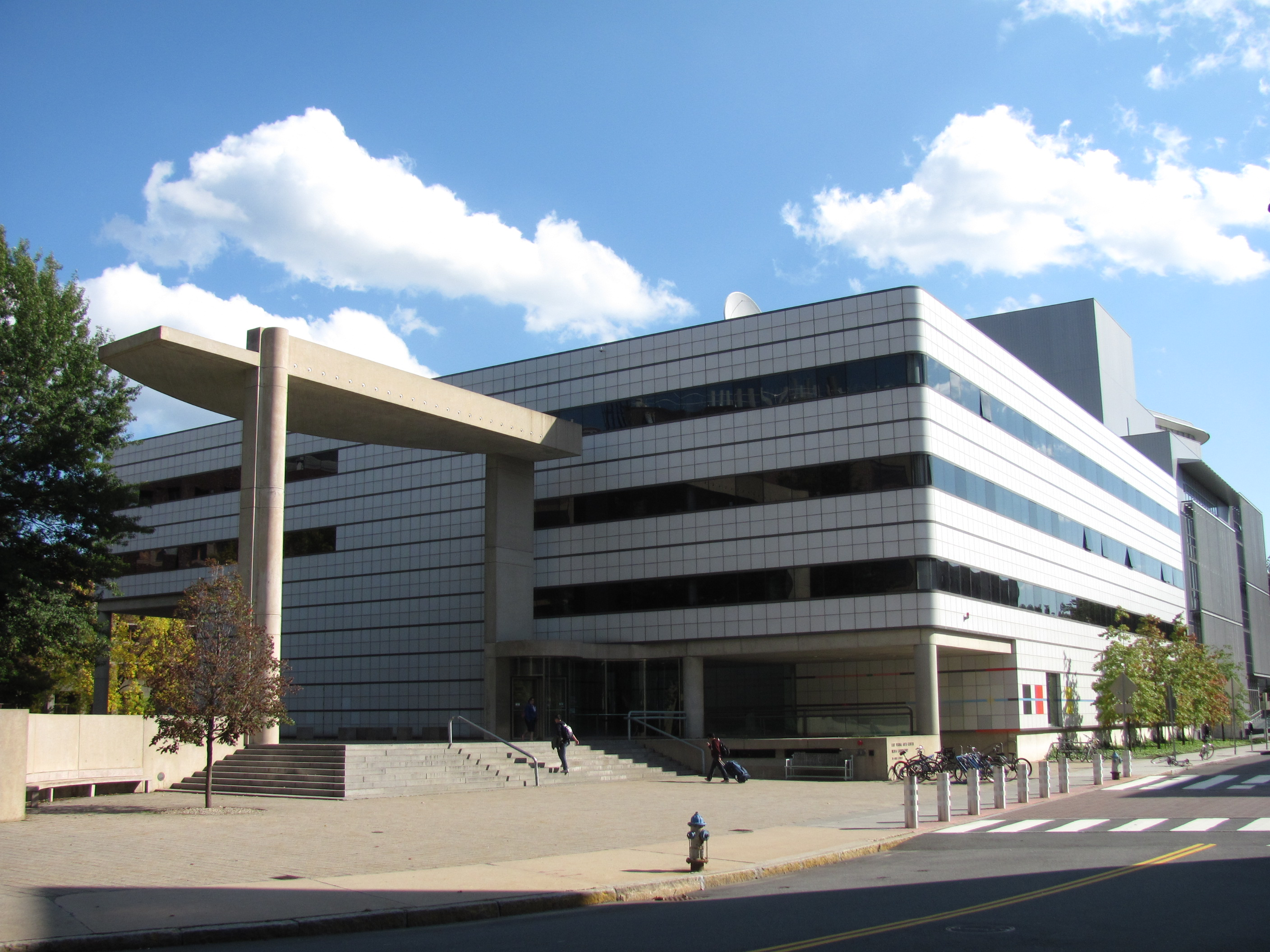
Building E15 on MIT's campus, home to the ACT program.

The MIT Program in Art, Culture and Technology (ACT) has its origins in the Center for Advanced Visual Studies (CAVS) at the Massachusetts Institute of Technology (MIT), an arts and research center founded in 1967 by artist and teacher György Kepes. In 2009, CAVS merged with the MIT Visual Arts Program, to become the MIT Program in Art, Culture and Technology (ACT). The Program is part of the MIT School of Architecture and Planning.

== History ==
György Kepes, who taught at the New Bauhaus (now the IIT Institute of Design in Chicago), founded the Center at MIT as a way to encourage artistic collaboration on a large civic scale. During its 45-year existence, the CAVS hosted more than 200 artists and fellows that "pioneered collaborative works in light, kinetic, environmental and inflatable sculpture, laser, steam, video, electronic music, holography, dance, computer graphics and animation, among other media".

In 1974, Otto Piene succeeded Kepes as the director of the CAVS. Piene retired in 1994 and the CAVS was taken over by Krzysztof Wodiczko, who, after a hiatus, continued as director. In 2004, Wodiczko brought on board a new staff including Associate Director Larissa Harris, Meg Rotzel, and Joe Zane. The CAVS began a revitalization program which included numerous site visits by international artists, long-term residencies, and the commissioning of new artistic projects. Some of the later visitors included Marjetica Potrč, Miranda July, Vito Acconci, Simon Starling, Harrell Fletcher, John Malpede, David Robbins, Fritz Haeg, and Mel Chin.

The CAVS was originally located at 40 Massachusetts Avenue (MIT Building W11) near the center of the MIT campus, in space vacated by the relocation of the MIT branch of the Harvard/MIT Cooperative Society to the new Stratton Student Center. This CAVS space was later reassigned to on-campus religious counseling groups, and the CAVS was moved to 265 Massachusetts Avenue (MIT Building N52), north of the main campus. In 2009, the CAVS merged with the MIT Visual Arts Program (VAP), to become the MIT Program in Art, Culture and Technology (ACT), and moved into a new annex to the MIT Media Lab building, at 75 Amherst Street (MIT Building E14).

Archives, artworks, and artifacts from the history of the CAVS are preserved in the Center for Advanced Visual Studies Special Collection (CAVSSC). As of 2015, the collection is being cataloged; items are available to researchers, either remotely or in person, with advance notice.

== Faculty ==
The program's faculty include artists such as Reneé Green, Judith Barry, Joan Jonas, Nida Sinnokrot, and Krzysztof Wodiczko.

== Fellows ==
Some of the center's early fellows included artists Nam June Paik, Otto Piene, Vassilakis Takis, Jack Burnham, Wen-Ying Tsai, Stan Vanderbeek, Jürgen Claus, Maryanne Amacher, Joan Brigham, Lowry Burgess, Peter Campus, Muriel Cooper, Douglas Davis, Susan Gamble, Dieter Jung, Piotr Kowalski, Charlotte Moorman, Antoni Muntadas, Yvonne Rainer, Keiko Prince, Alan Sonfist, Aldo Tambellini, Joe Davis, Bill Seaman, Tamiko Thiel, Alejandro Sina, Don Ritter, Luc Courchesne, Bill Parker and Naoko Tosa.
