= Five Little Monkeys (book) =

1952 book by Juliet Kepes

- First edition (publ. Houghton Mifflin)
- Author: Juliet Kepes
- Awards: Caldecott Honor (1953)

Five Little Monkeys is a 1952 book by Juliet Kepes. It won her a Caldecott Honor citation in 1953, as well as other awards from the Museum of Modern Art, the American Institute of Graphic Artists, and the Society of Illustrators. The New York Times cited her books four times among the ten best children's books of the year.

== Plot ==
The book is about five little monkeys named Buzzo, Bibi, Binki, Bulu and Bali that are wild and have a bad reputation among the rest of the animals. They regain the favor of the other animals because they were brave and captured the terrible tiger of the story, later becoming heroes.

== Critical reception ==
Five Little Monkeys received good reviews. Kirkus Reviews stated, "Her pictures are big, splashy, and angular. The monkeys look as though they are made of electric charged pipe cleaners, and the overall effect epitomizes the humorous side of jungle life."

The New York Times said the book "will give a great deal of pleasure to small humans."
