= List Visual Arts Center =

Art museum in Cambridge, Mass., US

Coordinates: 42.3608°N 71.0877°W

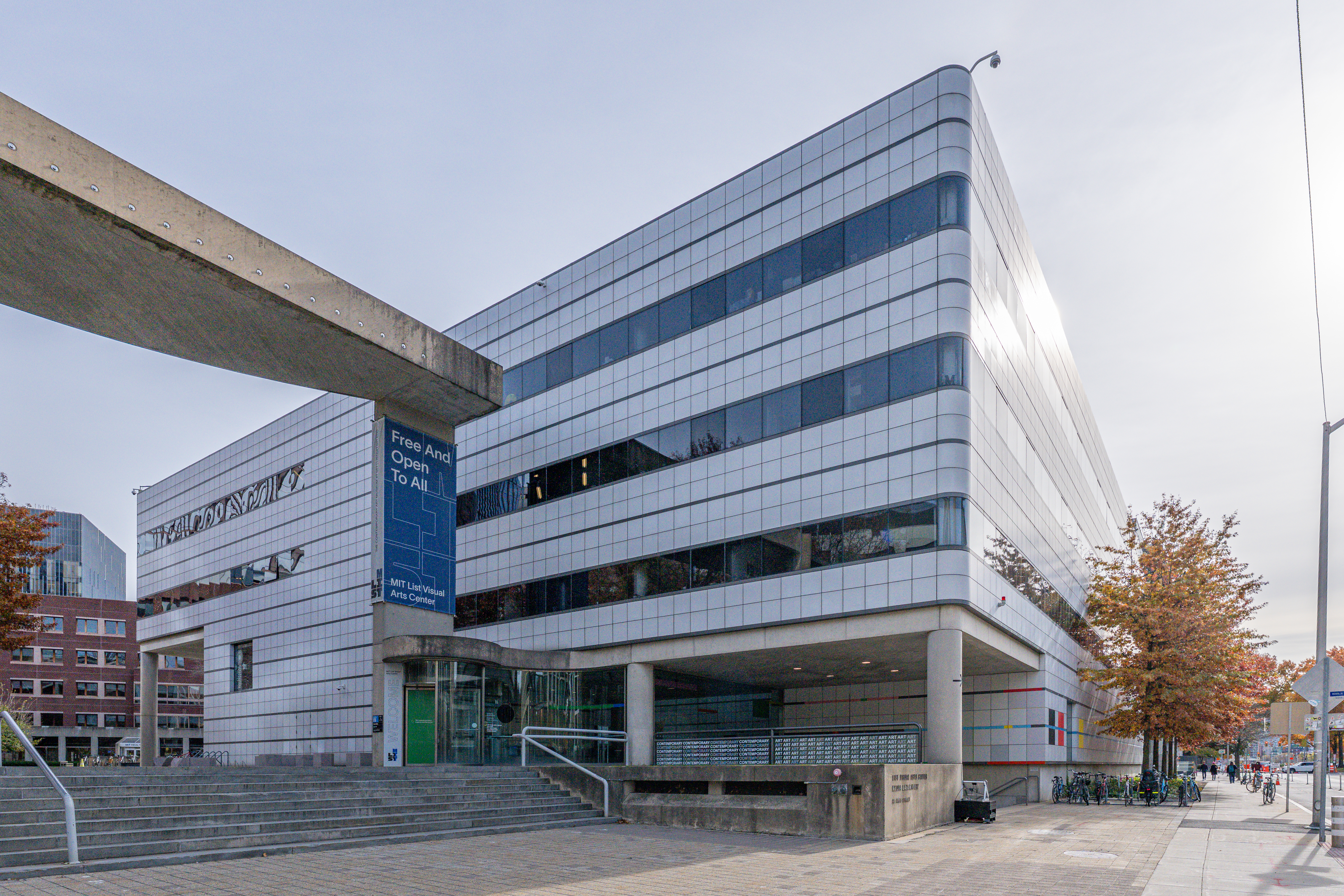
Wiesner Building (Building E15)

Established in 1950, the List Visual Arts Center (LVAC) is the contemporary art museum of the Massachusetts Institute of Technology. It is known for temporary exhibitions in its galleries located in the MIT Media Lab building, as well as its administration of the permanent art collection distributed throughout the university campus, faculty offices, and student housing.

== History ==
The original art exhibition space was established in 1950 and was soon called the MIT Hayden Gallery, after its location next to the entrance of the Hayden Library for Humanities and Sciences (MIT Building 14). It occupied a space which has now become the Elizabeth Parks Killian Hall, a 140-seat performance space used primarily for solo and chamber music recitals, lectures, and theater readings.

An early 1950-1951 exhibition showed mobiles, stabiles, and other artworks by Alexander Calder, in the "New Gallery, Charles Hayden Memorial Library". By 1970, the Hayden Gallery was exhibiting several contemporary art shows annually, such as the groundbreaking Exploration show, organized by the MIT Center for Advanced Visual Studies under the direction of György Kepes. This popular exhibition included interactive and kinetic light-based artworks by Wen-Ying Tsai, William H Wainwright and Kepes, and Takis.

In 1985, the museum was relocated to its current expanded facilities in the new Wiesner Building (E15) housing the MIT Media Lab, designed by I. M. Pei. The relocated museum was renamed the List Visual Arts Center in recognition of a gift by Vera and Albert List.

== Description ==
The LVAC is internationally recognized for the 6 to 9 temporary exhibitions it presents each year in its 6,000-square-foot (560 m^{2}) galleries, which are open to the general public. Admission is free to all, as are most events sponsored by the LVAC, including family-friendly hands-on art workshops.

The LVAC is housed in the Wiesner Building, an I.M. Pei-designed, fully accessible facility that incorporates the work of painter Kenneth Noland, sculptor Scott Burton, and environmental sculptor Richard Fleischner, all commissioned through MIT's Percent-for-Art program. The Percent-for-Art program, administered by the LVAC, allocates funds for the commission of artworks in connection with each new campus construction or major renovation project. Past commissions include Louise Nevelson's Transparent Horizon in front of the Landau Building, Sol LeWitt's polychrome floor in the Green Center for Physics, and Anish Kapoor's Non-Object (Plane) in the Stata Center.

== Permanent collection ==
The LVAC maintains a permanent collection, primarily sited throughout campus, of over 3,000 prints, photographs, drawings, paintings, sculptures, textiles, collages, and other objects of contemporary art. The public sculpture collection includes over 50 major works by such artists as Alexander Calder, Jorge Pardo, Henry Moore, Pablo Picasso, Louise Nevelson, Sarah Sze, Dan Graham, Jean-Robert Ipoustéguy, Cai Guo-Qiang, Jaume Plensa, Frank Stella, and Mark DiSuvero. The public art has been called "one of the best collections of its kind" in a guide to American sculpture parks and gardens.

An interactive map of all publicly situated art is available, as well as downloadable audio commentaries and printable brochures covering selected artworks. Detailed architectural coverage of major MIT buildings is also available.

The LVAC administers the Student Lending Art Program, consisting of over 700 original works of art in 2-dimensional framed media. Through this popular annual loan program, students may borrow original works of art from the collection for their private rooms or communal spaces. Since 1977, the artworks available for loan are exhibited in a comprehensive September show, which may also be viewed by the general public. Each year, approximately 15 new works are added to the collection and displayed in the Student Center for a year, and high-value selected older works are reassigned to the non-circulating permanent collection. New selections are made with the advice of the MIT Council for the Arts, and usually consist of artist's limited edition prints or photographs.

In addition, the LVAC administers a Campus Loan Art Program, which loans framed and sculptural artwork from its permanent collection for display in administration, faculty, and staff offices.

== Awards ==
The LVAC has been the commissioning institution for the Venice Biennales three times at the US Pavilion:

- 1999, artist Ann Hamilton with commissioners Katy Kline and Helaine Posner
- 2003, artist Fred Wilson with Kathy Goncharov as the commissioner
- 2015, artist Joan Jonas with Paul Ha as commissioner
