= The World's First Collaborative Sentence =

Work of internet art by Douglas Davis

The World's First Collaborative Sentence is a work of internet art by Douglas Davis begun in 1994. It is held by the Whitney Museum of American Art, and one version of it remains live to the present day.

== History ==
Douglas Davis began the "sentence without a period" in 1994 at the art gallery at Lehman College, inviting people to contribute "words, photographs, video, graphics, WWW links, and sound via the Internet, the World Wide Web, email, regular mail, and personal visits." It was acquired by the Whitney Museum of American Art in 1995 but became plagued by technical problems such as file loss, link rot, and formatting issues. By the year 2000, the sentence had received nearly 200,000 contributions.

== Preservation ==
In 2012, the Whitney decided to resurrect the work but found that it was completely unusable due to out-of-date code and links. Restoring the work generated a debate among conservators as to whether the links and code should be updated or left in their original state as a testament to the ephemeral nature of the web. The Whitney ultimately decided to duplicate the work and display two versions. The historical version, which is now locked to new contributions, was left frozen in time with broken and old links redirected through the Wayback Machine to the 1990s version of sites when possible. The updated, "live" version, allows people to continue to contribute to the sentence, and the Whitney has opened some aspects of its maintenance to outside users.
