= Bill Parker (inventor) =

American artist, scientist, and entrepreneur

William P. Parker is an American artist, scientist, and entrepreneur, best known for inventing the modern design of the plasma globe. The invention occurred in 1971, when Parker was working as a student in a physics laboratory at the Massachusetts Institute of Technology and accidentally filled a test chamber to a greater-than-usual pressure with ionized neon and argon. Three years later, Parker was artist-in-residence at the Exploratorium in San Francisco and created two installations using this technology, entitled Quiet Lightning and AM Lightning.

Parker has also exhibited at the MIT Museum, the New York Hall of Science, and the Housatonic Museum at Housatonic Community College in Bridgeport, Connecticut. He was the youngest Fellow at the MIT Center for Advanced Visual Studies. Plasma globes based on his designs were commercially popular in the 1980s and “are found in nearly every science museum in the world".

In the 1980s, Parker founded Diffraction Ltd, a defense electro-optics developer that was purchased by the O'Gara Group in 2005. and in 2006 he spun off another company, Creative MicroSystems, focusing on microfluidics. He maintains a studio in Waitsfield, Vermont, and in 2008 he was elected to the Waitsfield select board.

== Patents ==
- Self contained gas discharge device
- Self contained gas discharge display device
- Decorative gas plasma light display
