= Elizabeth Goldring Piene =

American poet and visual artist exploring a visual language for the blind.

- Elizabeth Goldring at artist Joan Brigham's home in Cambridge, MA, November 9, 2015, photo: Ellen Sebring
- Born: February 13, 1945 (age 81); Forest City, Iowa
- Known for: poetry; retina prints and collaborative artworks
- Spouse(s): Steven R. Goldring, MD (married 1967-1979); Otto Piene (married 1988-2014)

Elizabeth Goldring Piene (born February 13, 1945, Forest City, Iowa), is an American poet and visual artist (known professionally as Elizabeth Goldring) who pioneered visualizing conditions of blindness in her creative work and research. Goldring advocates expressions of the visually impaired through her interactions with the medical community, research projects at the Massachusetts Institute of Technology (MIT), her poetry volumes, and the artwork she developed known as retina prints. She resides in Groton, Massachusetts on a farm purchased on Valentine’s Day in 1983 with her husband, artist Otto Piene (1928–2014), now the site of the Elizabeth Goldring-Otto Piene Foundation where she serves as Chairman of the Board.

Elizabeth Goldring and her retina print, "Wandering Monk," Experience of Seeing exhibit, Groton School, January 11, 2015, photo: Ellen Sebring

== Early life and education ==
Elizabeth Goldring Piene was born Elizabeth Olson in 1945 in Forest City, Iowa. She grew up in Nebraska where her father, American historian James C. Olson (1917–2005), taught at the University of Nebraska, later becoming the president of the University of Missouri System. Goldring earned a BA from Smith College and a master's degree from Harvard University. She was awarded the 2004 Smith College Medal given to "alums who, in the judgment of the trustees, exemplify in their lives and work the true purpose of a liberal arts education."

== Work ==
As a poet and artist, Elizabeth Goldring often represents the perspective of being visually impaired and the importance of keeping the visual sense alive. She explored these themes at the Massachusetts Institute of Technology, where she held appointments at the Center for Advanced Visual Studies (CAVS), including Senior Fellow, Exhibits and Projects Director, and Acting Co-director, between 1975 and 2013. She collaborated with medical and research scientists to develop seeing tools that generated visual experiences for those, like herself, with severe vision loss, in her case due to diabetic retinopathy and macular degeneration. Expressing her visual experiences was explored through collaborations with video artists—notably Vin Grabill—who were Artist Fellows at CAVS.

Goldring has published five books of poetry. Her latest collection of poems, Still Blue, (University of Arkansas Press, 2023) was a tribute to her husband, artist Otto Piene, who passed away in 2014. An internationally acclaimed artist, Piene was the Director of CAVS at MIT from 1974 to 1993, and a frequent collaborator on Goldring's projects.

Goldring is co-author of the first history of CAVS titled Centerbook: The Center for Advanced Visual Studies and the Evolution of Art-Science-Technology at MIT (Elizabeth Goldring and Ellen Sebring, SA&P Press and ZKM Karlsruhe, 2019), distributed by MIT Press.

== Personal Life ==
Goldring was married from 1967 to 1979 to Steven R. Goldring, MD. Their daughter, Jessica, lives with her family in Brittany, France. Goldring was married to Otto Piene from 1988 until his death in 2014. She and her partner, flutist David Whiteside, live in Groton, Massachusetts.

== Books ==
=== Poetry ===
- Still Blue, BkMK Press, 2023
- The Light Silo Das Licht-Silo, Bilingual, English and German. Sketches by Otto Piene and poems by Elizabeth Goldring Piene, Delight Edition, 2014
- Ey-: poems & retina prints, BkMK Press, Kansas City, 2002
- Without Warning: 49 Poems, BkMk Press and Helicon Nine Editions, Kansas City, 1995
- Laser Treatment: poems and two stories, Blue Giant Press, Boston, 1983

=== Non-Fiction ===
- Centerbook: The Center for Advanced Visual Studies and the Evolution of Art-Science-Technology at MIT, by Elizabeth Goldring and Ellen Sebring, foreword by John Durant, Afterword by Gediminas Urbonas, SA&P Press and ZKM Karlsruhe, distributed by MIT Press, 2019
