= Juliet Kepes =

British illustrator, painter and sculptor

Juliet Kepes (née Appleby; 1919–1999) was a British illustrator, painter and sculptor.

== Life ==
Kepes studied at Brighton School in the 1930s, and met her future husband, György Kepes in Shaftesbury Avenue in 1936. When in 1937, György was offered a teaching position at the New Bauhaus in Chicago – Juliet went with him to study, while he taught. In later life, they moved to Cambridge, Massachusetts – again for György's work.

== Professional work ==
In the early 1950s, Kepes began writing and illustrating children's book. Her first work was published in 1952 and was titled Five Little Monkeys. The work was good enough to win a Caldecott Medal honour in 1953, missing out on the medal to The Biggest Bear by Lynd Ward.

== Bibliography ==
- Five Little Monkeys (1952) - author and illustrator
- Laughing Time (1953) – illustrator
- The Seven Remarkable Bears (1954) – illustrator
- Beasts from a Brush (1955) – author and illustrator
- Boy Blue’s Book of Beasts (1957) – illustrator
- Frogs Merry (1961) – author and illustrator
- Five Little Monkey Business (1965) - author and illustrator
