= Edward A. Shanken =

American art historian (born 1964)

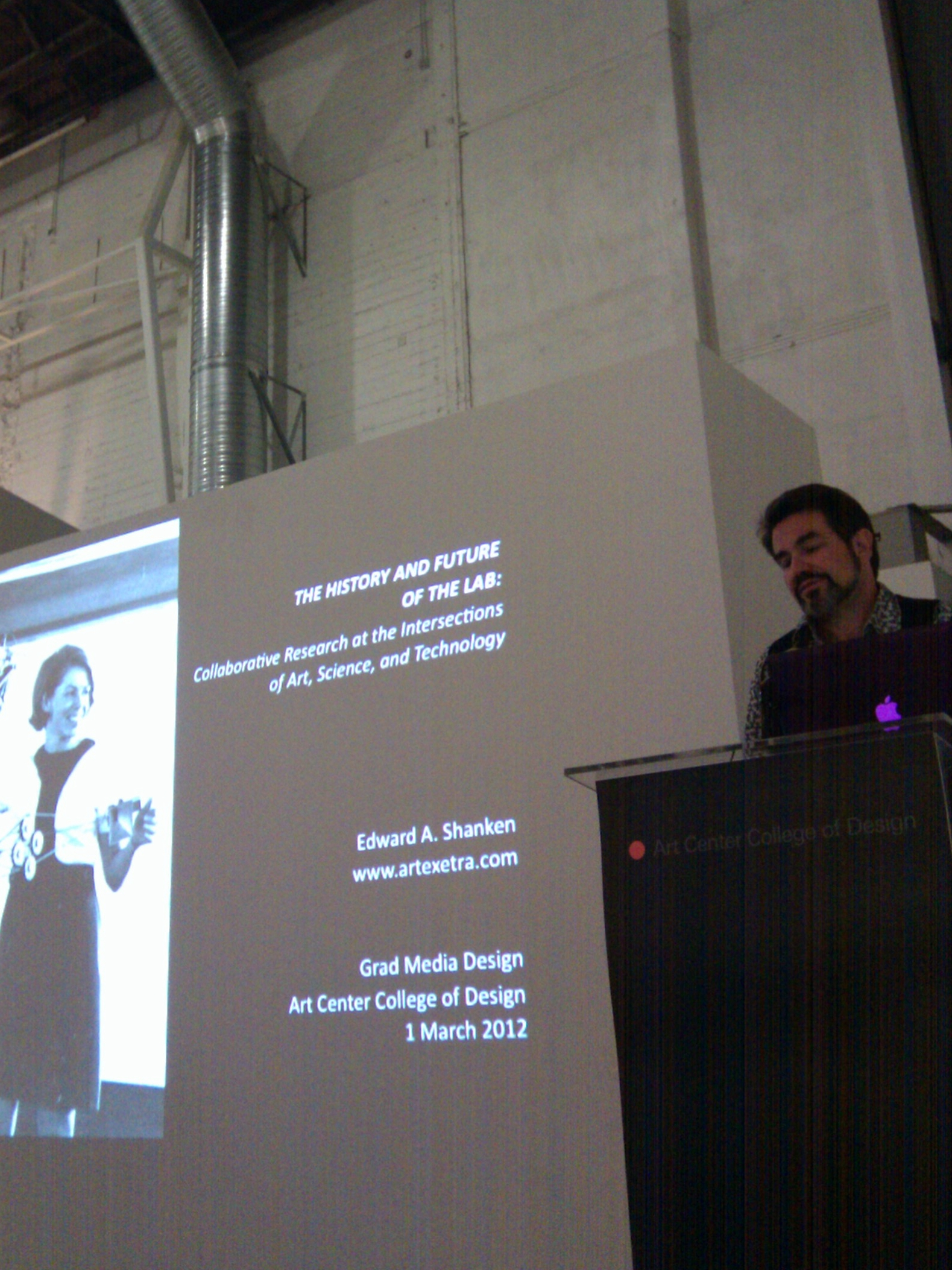
- Born: 1964 (age 61–62)
- Education: PhD in Art History, Duke University, MBA, Yale School of Management, BA, Haverford College
- Occupation: Professor
- Employer: University of California, Santa Cruz
- Known for: research at the intersection of art and technology
- Website: http://artexetra.com

Edward A. Shanken (born 1964) is an American art historian, whose work focuses on the entwinement of art, science and technology, with a focus on experimental new media art and visual culture. Shanken is Professor of digital arts & new media at UC Santa Cruz. His scholarship has appeared in numerous journals and anthologies and has been translated into many languages. Shanken is the author of Art and Electronic Media (Phaidon Press, 2009), among other titles.

== Background ==
Edward A. Shanken graduated from Haverford College (1986) and then obtained an MA (1999) and Ph.D. (2001) in Art History from Duke University after receiving an MBA from Yale University in 1990. He was the executive director of the Information Science Information Studies program (ISIS) at Duke University from 2001 to 2004. From 2004 to 2007 Shanken was Professor of Art History and Media Theory at Savannah College of Art and Design and Senior Researcher at the UCLA Art | Science Center and Visiting Scholar at the California NanoSystems Institute from 2007 to 2008. He joined the Department of Media Studies, University of Amsterdam in 2008, where he served as Universitair Docent, New Media and Digital Culture, 2008-2010 and as a Researcher, 2010-2012. In 2010, he was the inaugural Louis D. Beaumont Scholar at Washington University in St. Louis. Since 2007 he has served on the faculty of the Media Art Histories MA program at Donau University, Krems, Austria. In 2013 he joined the faculty at the Center for Digital Arts and Experimental Media (DXARTS) at University of Washington. In 2016, Shanken joined UC Santa Cruz as Director of the innovative Digital Arts/New Media (DANM) MFA program.

Shanken has been awarded fellowships from the Andy Warhol Foundation for Visual Arts, National Endowment for the Arts and the American Council of Learned Societies. He was formerly chair of the Leonardo Education Forum and a member of the College Art Association Education Committee and has served as an advisor to the Media Art Histories conference, ISEA, the journal Technoetic Arts, and the Leonardo Pioneers and Pathbreakers project. He has conducted extensive research on the theorist and art critic Jack Burnham and into cybernetics as applied to systems art in the 1960s.

== Research Activity ==
Publications include essays on technoshamanism, environmental art, art and technology in the 1960s, interactivity and agency, the historiography of art and technology, parallels between conceptual art and art and technology, and the cultural implications of cybernetics, telematics, robotics, and biotechnology. Shanken’s current research examines art-science collaboration and the relationship between the discourses of mainstream contemporary art and new media art. Following the first concern, he chaired the panel discussion,"Artists in Industry and the Academy: Interdisciplinary Research Collaborations" at the 2004 Annual Conference of the College Art Association and served as guest editor of a special series of essays under the same title in the Leonardo Journal (38:4 and 38:5) in 2005. More recently he guest-edited a special series of essays, “The Reception and Rejection of Art and Technology: Exclusions and Revulsions,” which appeared in the journals a minima (Mar 2008) and Leonardo 42: 2 (Apr 2008). Following the second concern, he organized and chaired a panel discussion with Nicolas Bourriaud, Peter Weibel and Michael Joaquin Grey at Art Basel in June 2010 (see external link below) and organized and chaired a panel discussion at the College Art Association Annual Conference (CAA) in 2011, the papers of which were published in a special issue of ArtNodes (see links below). A further research area is the use of social media to expand and democratize the production and dissemination of art criticism. This is exemplified by the Art and Electronic Media Online Companion, a Web 2.0 site.

== Teaching Activity ==
Shanken currently teaches at UC Santa Cruz. He has previously taught media and art history at Rhode Island School of Design, Duke University, Savannah College of Art and Design, the University of Amsterdam, Donau University (Austria), the Center for Digital Arts and Experimental Media (DXARTS) at the University of Washington.

== Publishing Activity ==
Shanken is the editor of Telematic Embrace: Visionary Theories of Art, Technology and Consciousness, the collected writings of Roy Ascott (University of California Press, 2003). His essay, "Art in the Information Age: Technology and Conceptual Art" received honorable mention in the Leonardo Award for Excellence in 2004. His book Inventing the Future: Art, Electricity, New Media was published in Spanish in 2013. He is also the editor of the anthology Systems published in 2015 through Whitechapel and MIT Press.

== Bibliography ==
- Shanken, Edward A. Systems. London and Cambridge MA: Whitechapel Gallery and MIT Press, 2015. ISBN 9780262527194
- Shanken, Edward A. Inventar el Futuro: arte - electricadad - nuevos medios. Trans. Everardo Reyes García y Pau Waelder Laso. Brooklyn: Departamento de Ficción, 2013. ISBN 978-0-9846555-1-9.
- Shanken, Edward A. Art and Electronic Media. London: Phaidon, 2009. ISBN 978-0-7148-4782-5
- Ascott, Roy. Telematic Embrace: Visionary Theories of Art, Technology, and Consciousness. Edited and with an essay by Edward A. Shanken. Berkeley: University of California Press, 2003. ISBN 0-520-21803-5

== Key Essays ==
- 2019 "Pushing the Limits: Surrealism, Possession, and the Multiple Self: Juan Downey and The Laughing Alligator"
- 2017 "A Sounding Happens: Pauline Oliveros, Expanded Consciousness, and Healing" (co-authored with Yolande Harris)
- 2016 “Contemporary Art and New Media: Hybrid Discourse or Digital Divide?”
- 2012 “Investigatory Art: Real Time Systems and Network Culture”
- 2011 "The History and Future of the Lab: Collaborative Research at the Intersections of Art, Science, and Technology"
- 2009 "Reprogramming Systems Aesthetics: A Strategic Historiography"
- 2007 “Historicizing Art and Technology: Forging a Method and Firing a Canon”
- 2005 "Artists in Industry and the Academy: Collaborative Research, Interdisciplinary Scholarship, and the Interpretation of Hybrid Forms"
- 2003 "Cybernetics and Art: Cultural Convergence in the 1960s"
- 2001 "Art in the Information Age: Technology and Conceptual Art"
- 2000 "Tele-Agency: Telematics, Telerobotics, and the Art of Meaning"
