= Wiesner Building =

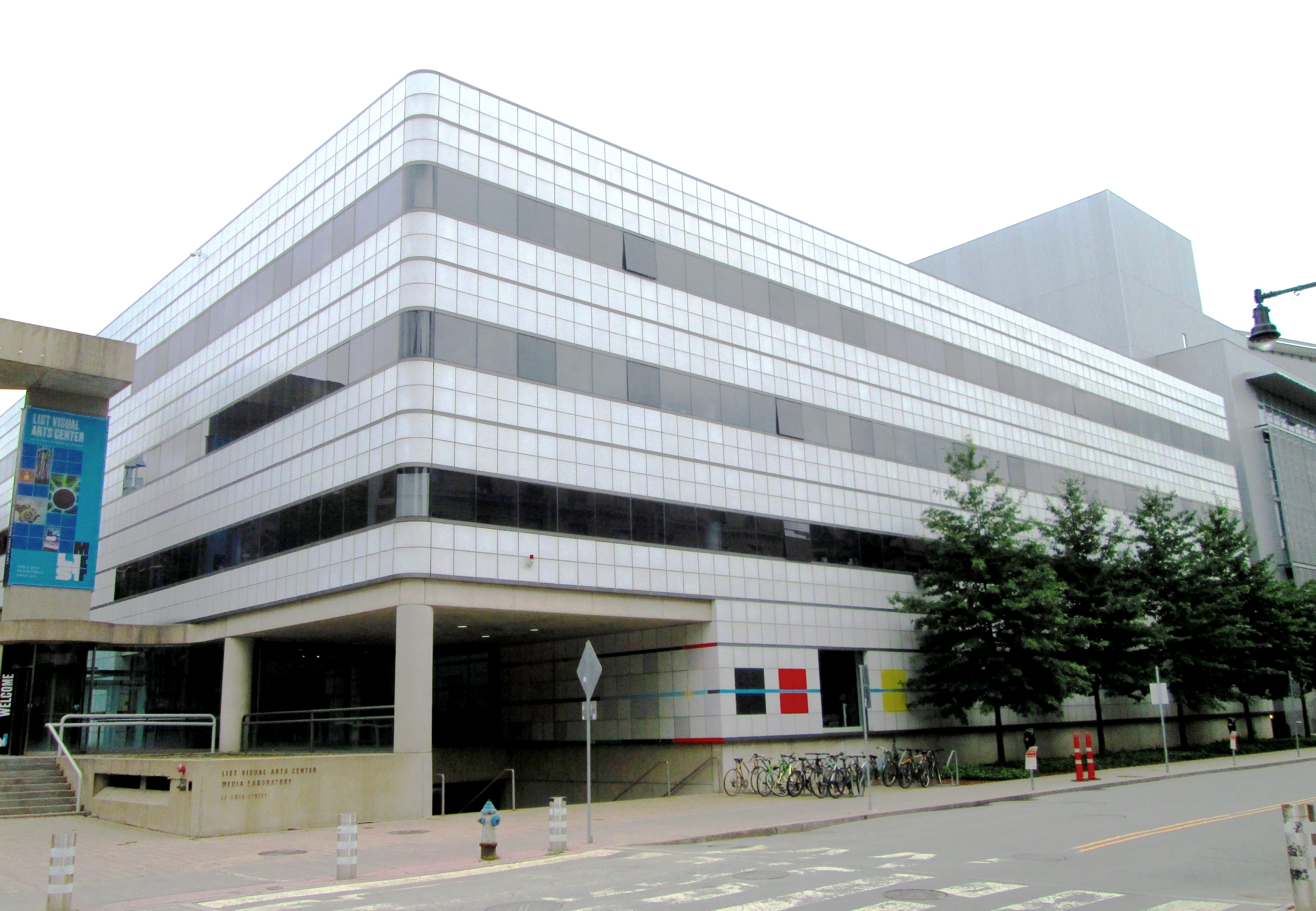
- (2017)
- Interactive map of the Wiesner Building area
- Alternative names: Building E15

General information
- Type: Research laboratories
- Architectural style: Modern
- Location: 20 Ames Street; Cambridge, Massachusetts
- Coordinates: 42°21′39.1″N 71°5′15.8″W
- Current tenants: Media Laboratory
- Completed: 1985

Technical details
- Floor count: 6

Design and construction
- Architects: I. M. Pei & Partners

The Wiesner building (Building E15) houses the MIT Media Lab and the List Visual Arts Center and is named in honor of former MIT president Jerome Wiesner and his wife Laya. The building is very box-like, a motif that is consistently repeated in both the interior and exterior design evoking a sense of boxes packed within each other.

The building is notable for the level of collaboration between the architect and artists. It stands apart from the surrounding neighborhood with its flat, gridded skin make of white, modular metal panels. The building's exterior, designed by Kenneth Noland, is meant as a metaphor of technology through the grids of graph paper and number matrices while also quoting the corridor-like morphology of the rest of the MIT campus. Scott Burton, Alan Shields, and Richard Fleischner also collaborated extensively in the final design of the internal atria and external landscaping.

The Wiesner Building in Cambridge, Massachusetts houses the MIT Media Lab, the Center for Bits and Atoms (Neil Gershenfeld's lab), the Department of Architecture's Program in Art, Culture and Technology (ACT, formerly the Visual Arts Program), the Comparative Media Studies (CMS) program and the List Visual Arts Center. It was designed by I.M. Pei & Partners. It is named in honor of former MIT president Jerome Wiesner and his wife Laya and was dedicated in 1985.

The Wiesner Building is also known to the Massachusetts Institute of Technology community as Building E15.

== See also ==
- MIT Campus - Wiesner_Building
