= Don Ritter (artist) =

Canadian artist (born 1959)

- Born: 1959 (age 66–67); Camrose, Alberta
- Known for: interactive installation artist, electronic artist
- Notable work: Orpheus, Intersection
- Website: aesthetic-machinery.com

Don Ritter (born 1959) is a visual, sound and media artist known for his interactive electronic installation works. His works of art use digital media in architectural projections, immersive video-sound installations, performances and prints. He currently lives in Montréal, Quebec.

== Life ==
Don Ritter was born in Camrose, Alberta. He studied electronics engineering at The Northern Alberta Institute of Technology, fine arts and psychology at the University of Waterloo, and visual studies at MIT's Center for Advanced Visual Studies and the MIT Media Lab.

During his studies at M.I.T. he was paired with George E. Lewis and he made an interactive video to go with his trombone playing.

Ritter worked abroad for 23 years as an artist and academic in Boston, New York City, Berlin, Seoul and Hong Kong. Among his appointments, he was a professor in the School of Creative Media at the City University of Hong Kong.

== Work ==
Ritter's work brings together computers, sensors, and the human body to create interactive experiences for audiences. Ritter has said that "the experience of interactive art should be an aesthetically pleasing experience not only for the mind but also for the body". His software Orpheus (1987), which enabled an improvising musician to control the narrative projection of video, is an early example of an interactive video installation. In his 1993 interactive installation Intersection, viewers cross a virtual highway in a large darkroom . The highway is represented by the computer-controlled sound of cars passing and coming to a screeching halt.

Ritter has exhibited internationally since 1988 at museums, festivals and galleries in 23 countries, including the 2010 Winter Olympics (in Vancouver) and the Ars Electronica Festival (in Linz).

== Honours and awards ==
In 2024, Ritter was awarded a Governor General's Awards in Visual and Media Arts.
