= Jack Burnham =

American art historian (1931–2019)

- Burnham in the 1960s
- Born: November 11, 1931; New York City, U.S.
- Died: February 25, 2019 (aged 87)
- Occupation: Art historian
- Known for: Systems theory in contemporary art
- Awards: Fellow, MIT Center for Advanced Visual Studies, 1968-9; Guggenheim Fellowship, 1973

Academic background
- Education: Yale School of Art

Academic work
- Institutions: Northwestern University; University of Maryland
- Main interests: Systems theory, art and technology
- Notable works: "Systems Esthetics" "Beyond Modern Sculpture"

Jack Wesley Burnham Jr. (born New York City, November 13, 1931 – February 25, 2019) was an American writer and theorist of art and technology, who taught art history at Northwestern University and the University of Maryland. He is one of the main forces behind the emergence of systems art in the 1960s.

Between the years of 1955 and 1965, he created sculptures many of which incorporated light.

== Biography ==
Burnham was in the U.S. Army Corps of Engineers during the Cold War from 1949 to 1952, stationed at Fort Belvoir, working in the drafting school.

Burnham began his studies in 1953 at the Boston Museum School where he studied design, silversmithing, sculpture and painting. He began a friendship with the Soviet sculptor Naum Gabo who was teaching at Harvard University at the time; he considered Gabo to be his mentor. He took two years off between 1954 and 1956 to study engineering at the Wentworth Institute of Technology, and received an associates degree in engineering.

Burnham received a BFA from the Yale School of Art in 1959 and a MFA in 1961.

From 1955 until 1965 he worked as a sculptor, often created sculptures that included light. In the 1960s he started teaching art history at Northwestern University, and became chairman of their art department. He was the Inaugural Fellow at MIT's Center for Advanced Visual Studies from 1968 to 1969. During this time he distanced himself from Gabo, and also from György Kepes's notion of the "New Bauhaus", the latter because Kepes failed to embrace advanced technology and the use of computers in art. Burnham aligned himself with Oliver Selfridge and Jack Nolan, who were both computer scientists.

In the 1980s he moved to the University of Maryland and again chaired the art and art history departments.

Retiring in the 1990s, Burnham lived in Hyattsville, Maryland, immersed in Kabbalah.

== Work as a writer ==
Jack Burnham worked as a writer, and in the 1960s and 1970s made important contributions as an art theorist, critic and curator in the field of systems art. In systems art the concept and ideas of process related systems and systems theory are involved in the work to take precedence over traditional aesthetic object related and material concerns. Burnham named Systems art in the 1968 Artforum article "System Esthetics": "He had investigated the effects of science and technology on the sculpture of this century, and saw a dramatic contrast between the handling of the place-oriented object sculpture and the extreme mobility of Systems sculpture".

In 1970, he curated the exhibition at the Jewish Museum, "Software – Information Technology: Its New Meaning for Art". The exhibition included work by Agnes Denes, Hans Haacke, Nam June Paik and others. The exhibition is considered one of the most important on the history of technology and art, and a precursor to contemporary digital art.

Burnham was the Associate editor of Arts Magazine between the years 1968 and 1970; he also published many articles in the magazine. From 1971 to 1973 he wrote for Artforum magazine as a contributing editor.

In 1973, Burnham was awarded a fellowship from the John Simon Guggenheim Memorial Foundation to study the alchemical symbolism used in Marcel Duchamp's art. Following that, he continued to apply Kabbalistic interpretations of art throughout his life, and taught it as an art critical method at the University of Maryland. As an art historian Burnham argued that aesthetics must be held to new criteria; for example, he believed that art went beyond pure visual pleasure, or the art object's function in the gallery marketplace. He suggested that art and aesthetics were relavatory, and that art could operate as an "information-processing device", similar to machines or ritual, and that artworks could function as an apparatus between natural phenomena and cultural phenomena.

In far away New Zealand Burnham's work was used as a core text at the Ilam School of Fine Arts by professor Tom Taylor and students of Ilam like Paul Cullen and Barry Thomas both referenced his influence on their work.

== Work as an artist ==
Burnham with one of his light-tape sculptures in 1967

While he is best known as a theorist, Burnham was trained as an artist; the art he produced included alchemy-imspired diagrammatic drawings, sculptures and works that incorporated light. From 1955 through the 1960s he focused on sculpture, many of which incorporated light or included viewer-activated technology and electro-luminous "ribbons". During a fellowship at MIT, Burnham created a series of sculptures including Tape Light (1969). The sculptures and light environments were made with electroluminescent Tape-Lite, a material produced by the Sylvania Corporation that was used by the military for safety lights, instrument panels, and helicopter landing markers. Between the years of 1965–1969, he had five solo exhibitions of his work, and from 1957 to 1978, he participated in numerous group shows.

To support himself as an artist, he worked various jobs including architectural drafting, sign painter and fabricator, and later as an educator.

Burnham was referenced in American artist Mike Kelley catalogue for his exhibition, "Mike Kelley: The Uncanny" at Tate Liverpool. This exhibition featured Andy Warhol's Andy Warhol Robot. Burnham speaks about the manner in which anthropomorphic figures became equivalent to traditional sculpture.

== Publications ==
Burnham wrote several books and dozens of articles in magazines like: Art and Artists magazine, Arts and Society, Artforum magazine, Arts magazine. His books:

- 1968, Beyond Modern Sculpture: The Effects of Science and Technology on the Sculpture of This Century, New York: George Braziller; London: Allen Lane/Penguin Press.
- 1969, Art in the Marcusean Analysis, vol 6 of the "Penn State Papers in Art Education", edited by Paul Edmonston (Philadelphia: Pennsylvania State University, 1969).
- 1973, The Structure of Art, Revised Edition, Brazillera, ISBN 0-8076-0595-6.
- 1974, Great Western Salt Works: Essays on the Meaning of Post-Formalist Art, New York: George Braziller. 0-8076-0740-1.
- 1980, Art and Technology: The Panacea That Failed, The Myths of Information ed. Kathleen Woodward, Coda Press. ISBN 0-930956-13-3.
- 2015, Dissolve into Comprehension: Writings and Interviews, 1964–2004, edited by Melissa Ragain (Massachusetts: The MIT Press, 2015), ISBN 9780262029278.

=== About Jack Burnham ===
- Charlie Gere, Art, Time and Technology: Histories of the Disappearing Body (2005) Berg, pp. 124–138
- Robert Horvitz (2000–), "A Node for Jack Burnham".
- Matthew Rampley (2005). Systems Aesthetics: Burnham and Others. In: Vector e-zine. issue B-12, January 2005.
- Corrine Robins (1972). Burnham's Burden: Art is Over...Again in Art in America. March 1972, pp. 14–15.
- Edward A. Shanken (1998). "The House That Jack Built: Jack Burnham's Concept of Software as a Metaphor for Art". In: Leonardo Electronic Almanac, Vol. 6, No. 10 (November 1998).
- Edward A. Shanken (2001). "Art in the Information Age: Technology and Conceptual Art" SIGGRAPH 2001 Electronic Art and Animation Catalog, (New York: ACM SIGGRAPH, 2001): 8–15. Expanded in Leonardo 35:4 (Aug 2002).
- Edward A. Shanken (2009). "Reprogramming Systems Aesthetics: A Strategic Historiography". Proceedings of the Digital Arts and Culture Conference, 2009.
- Willoughby Sharp (1970). Willoughby Sharp Interviews Jack Burnham in Arts magazine. Vol. 45, No. 2, November 1970, pp. 21–23
- Luke Skrebowski (2006). All Systems Go: Recovering Jack Burnham's 'Systems Aesthetics. Tate Papers, Spring 2006
- Luke Skrebowski (2016). Jack Burnham Redux published in Grey Room journal, Fall 2016, No. 65 (Fall 2016), pp. 88–113. The MIT Press
- Jack Burnham, Hans Haacke, Esthétique de systèmes, Emanuele Quinz (ed.), Dijon, Les presses du réel, 2015,
