= Otto Piene =

German-American artist (1928–2014)

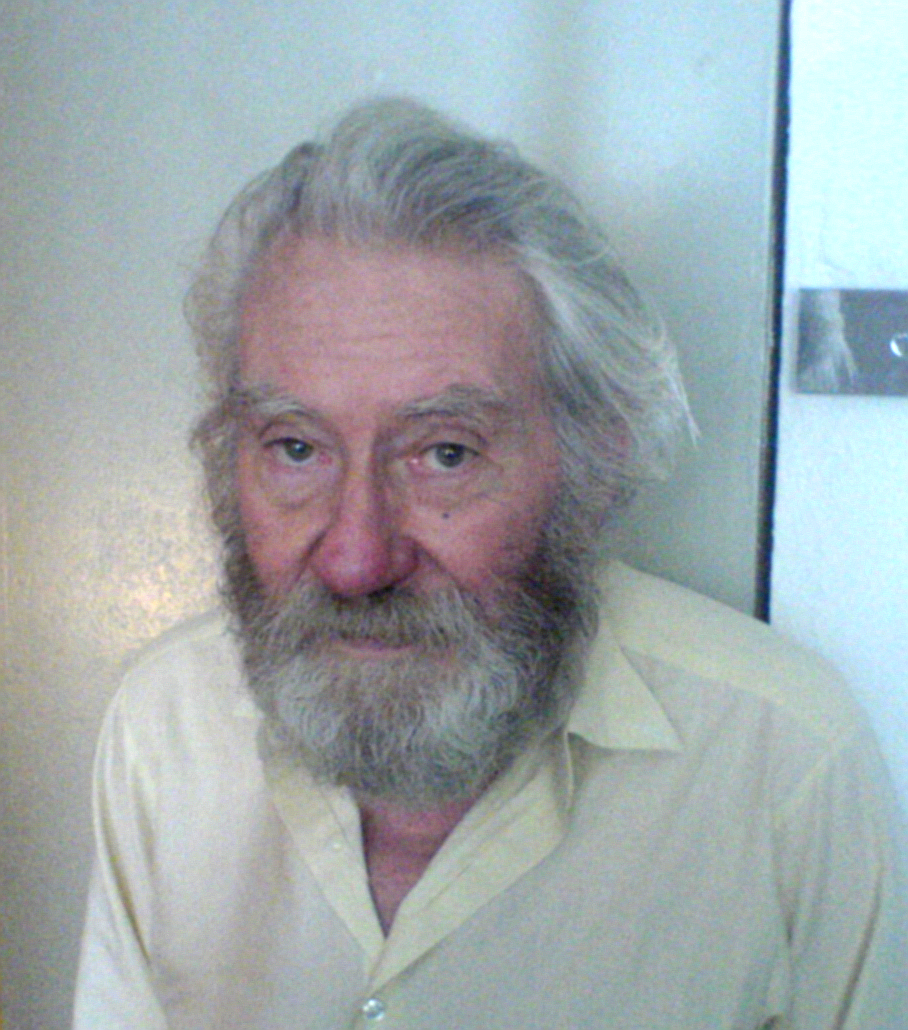
- Piene in 2007
- Born: 18 April 1928; Bad Laasphe, Westphalia, Prussia, Germany
- Died: 17 July 2014 (aged 86); Berlin, Germany
- Known for: Kinetic art, Performance art
- Movement: Zero (art)
- Awards: Leonardo da Vinci World Award of Arts (2003)

Otto Piene (PEE-nah, 18 April 1928 – 17 July 2014) was a German-American artist specializing in kinetic and technology-based art, often working collaboratively. He lived and worked in Düsseldorf, Germany; Cambridge, Massachusetts; and Groton, Massachusetts.

== Biography ==
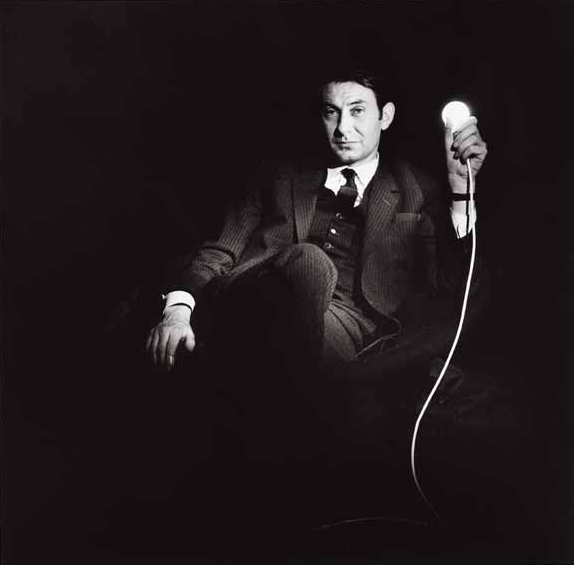
Otto Piene by Lothar Wolleh (c. 1960s)

Otto Piene was born in 1928 in Bad Laasphe and was raised in Lübbecke. At the age of 16, he was drafted into World War II as an anti-aircraft gunner. As a German soldier, he became fascinated by the glowing lines of searchlights and artillery fire in the night.

Post-war from 1949 to 1953, he studied painting and art education at the Academy of Fine Arts, Munich, and at the Kunstakademie Düsseldorf. He was a lecturer at the Fashion Institute in Düsseldorf. From 1952 to 1957, he studied philosophy at the University of Cologne.

He was a visiting professor at the University of Pennsylvania beginning in 1964. From 1968 to 1971, he was the first Fellow appointed to the Center for Advanced Visual Studies (CAVS), founded by György Kepes at the Massachusetts Institute of Technology. The CAVS allowed artists to work using sophisticated techniques and scientific partnership, promoting a highly-collaborative environment. In 1972, Piene was appointed a Professor of Environmental Art at MIT. In 1974 he succeeded Kepes as director of the CAVS, a position he served until 1 September 1993. Piene remained closely associated with CAVS and MIT for the rest of his life, and maintained longtime homes in both Groton, Massachusetts and Düsseldorf, Germany.

Piene collaborated with many artists, scientists, and engineers, including "Doc" Edgerton (pioneer of stroboscopy) and astrophysicist Walter Lewin at MIT. Many of his public installations required multiple collaborations because of their large physical scale and ambitious program. For example, his 1977 Centerbeam installation developed by CAVS artists based on a concept of CAVS Fellow Lowry Burgess, involved 22 artists and a group of scientists and engineers, some of whom were based internationally.

On 17 July 2014, Piene died of a heart attack in a taxi on the way to the opening of his Sky Art event at Neue Nationalgalerie in Berlin, Germany. His survivors included his wife Elizabeth Goldring (a poet and artist who collaborated with him), as well as four children (including daughter artist Chloe Piene), a stepdaughter, and five grandchildren.

== Group Zero ==
In 1957, Piene and Heinz Mack founded the group ZERO, consisting of artists who wanted to redefine art after World War II. In 1961, Günther Uecker joined the group. By the 1960s they were internationally known, especially in Japan, Americas, and throughout Europe. Members of the group included Piero Manzoni, Yves Klein, Jean Tinguely, and Lucio Fontana. Piene and Mack also published ZERO Magazine from 1957 to 1967. In 2008, Piene, Mack, Uecker, and Mattijs Visser created the international ZERO foundation. The foundation maintains the ZERO archives from the three Düsseldorfer-based artists, as well as documents and photos from other related artists.

== Works ==
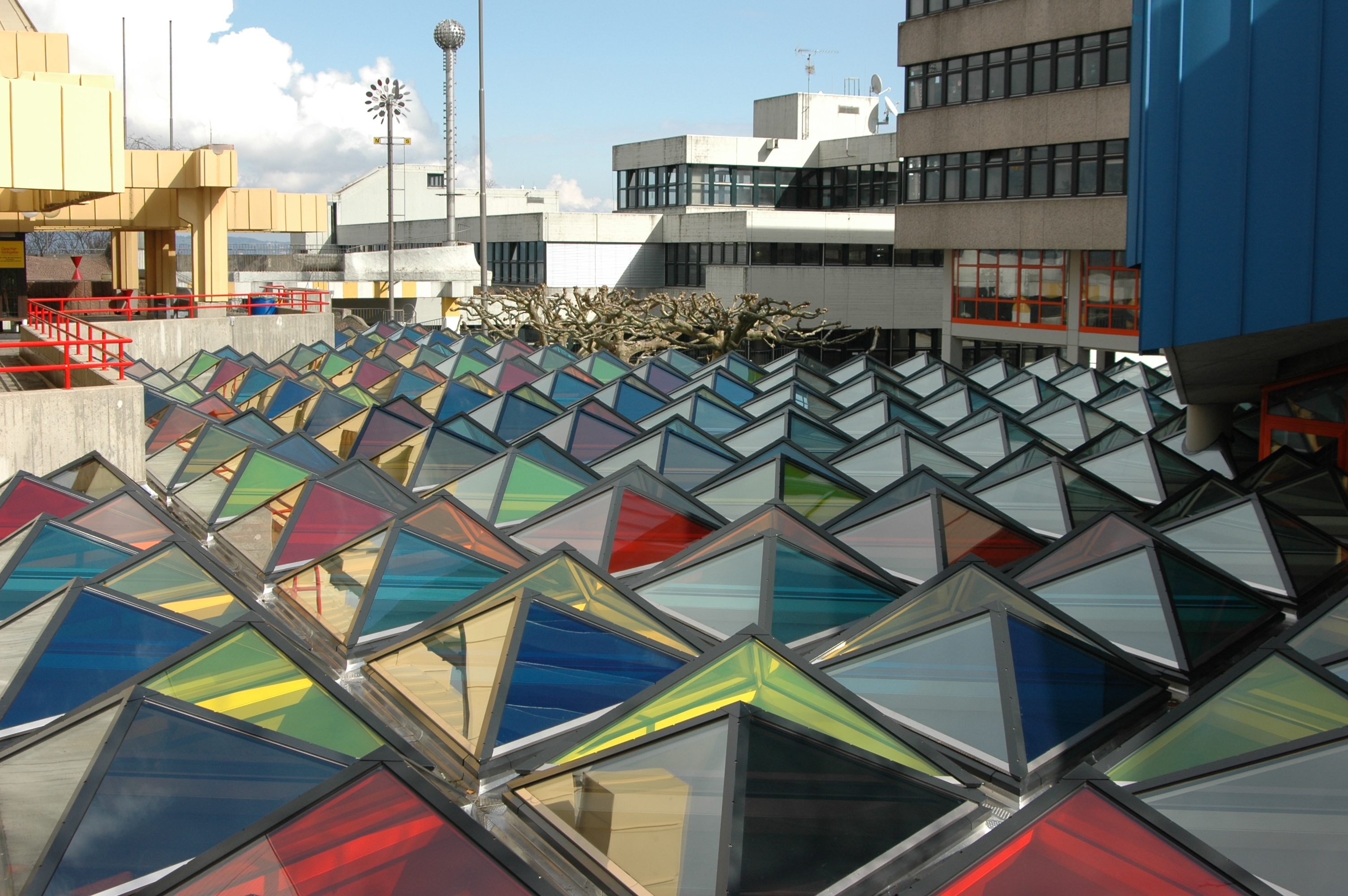
Otto Piene, foyer glass ceiling, 1970, University of Konstanz

Silver Fire, acrylic and scorch marks on linen, 1973, Honolulu Museum of Art

In 1957, Piene developed the Grid Picture, a type of stencilled painting made from half-tone screens with regularly arranged points in single colors (yellow, silver, white, or gold), for example Pure Energy (1958, New York, MOMA). Piene's work then developed in a variety of forms. The Lichtballette ("light ballet", 1959) was a development of the Grid Pictures; light from moving lamps was projected through grids, thus extending and stimulating the viewer's perception of space. This series of works was inspired by László Moholy-Nagy's Light Space Modulator (1930, located at Harvard since 1956) and Fernand Léger's Ballet Mécanique (1924).

Also in 1959, the combination of these grids with sources of fire (candles, gas-burners) produced smoke-traces and fire paintings, in which the paint was scorched. Piene created these Rauchbilder ("smoke pictures") as a reference to elemental natural energies and the Fumage of the surrealist painter Wolfgang Paalen, whom he dedicated a work after Paalen´s death in 1959. In his "fire paintings", he lightly burned a layer of solvent on pigmented paper, developing organic forms from the remnants of the resulting soot deposits. Throughout the remainder of his career, he continued his practice of making "smoke pictures". Fire and smoke (their traces) are important elements in these pictures. Silver Fire (1973, Honolulu Museum of Art) is an example of a smoke picture.

From the smoke images, but also from Piene’s experiments with the so‑called light ballet, the first fire‑generated images emerged around 1961. In numerous variations they have taken on a significant place within Otto Piene’s oeuvre. Piene’s first fire works arose from igniting fixatives, siccatives, varnishes and pigments that had accumulated on the canvas during the painting process. In this way, fire itself became a formative element. It produces rings, crusts and blisters in the layer of colour as it burns. They expand the predetermined circular form that dominates these works. Extinguishing the fire within a few seconds determined whether the picture succeeded or failed. A striking example of this phase is Feuerblume from 1966. It presents itself to the viewer as if frozen at the moment of its creation through the act of extinguishing.

Piene also experimented with multimedia combinations. In 1963, together with Günther Uecker and Heinz Mack, he became a spokesman of Neuen Idealismus ("the new idealism"). In 1967 Otto Piene premiered Proliferation of the Sun at Aldo Tambellini's Black Gate Theater, and in 1968 he collaborated with Aldo Tambellini on the Black Air at the Black Gate Theater. Piene is also noted for having explored new uses for broadcast television. In 1968, Aldo Tambellini and Otto Piene reformatted Black Air as Black Gate Cologne, which is cited as one of the first television programs to have been produced by experimental visual artists.

1967 marked the beginning of Piene's involvement with "Sky Art", a term he coined in 1969 for his use of landscape and cities themselves as the focal point of his work (Source Needed). For the closing of the 1972 Summer Olympics in Munich, Piene created the sky work Olympic Rainbow, made up of five different-colored floating helium-filled polyethylene tubes, each 600 metres (2,000 ft) long. Between 1981 and 1986, Piene organized four Sky Art conferences in the US and Europe.

He experimented in industrial design in the 1970s with a 500-piece run of the upscale Suomi tableware by Timo Sarpaneva that Piene decorated for the German Rosenthal porcelain maker's Studio Linie.

Working as the director of the CAVS at the Massachusetts Institute of Technology, Piene collaborated in the design of the kinetic sculpture performance Centerbeam first exhibited in Kassel, Germany in 1977. Later mounted on the National Mall in Washington DC, it featured laser-projected images on moving screens of steam, solar-tracked 3-D holograms, a 144-foot (44-metre) water prism, and helium-buoyed sky sculptures.

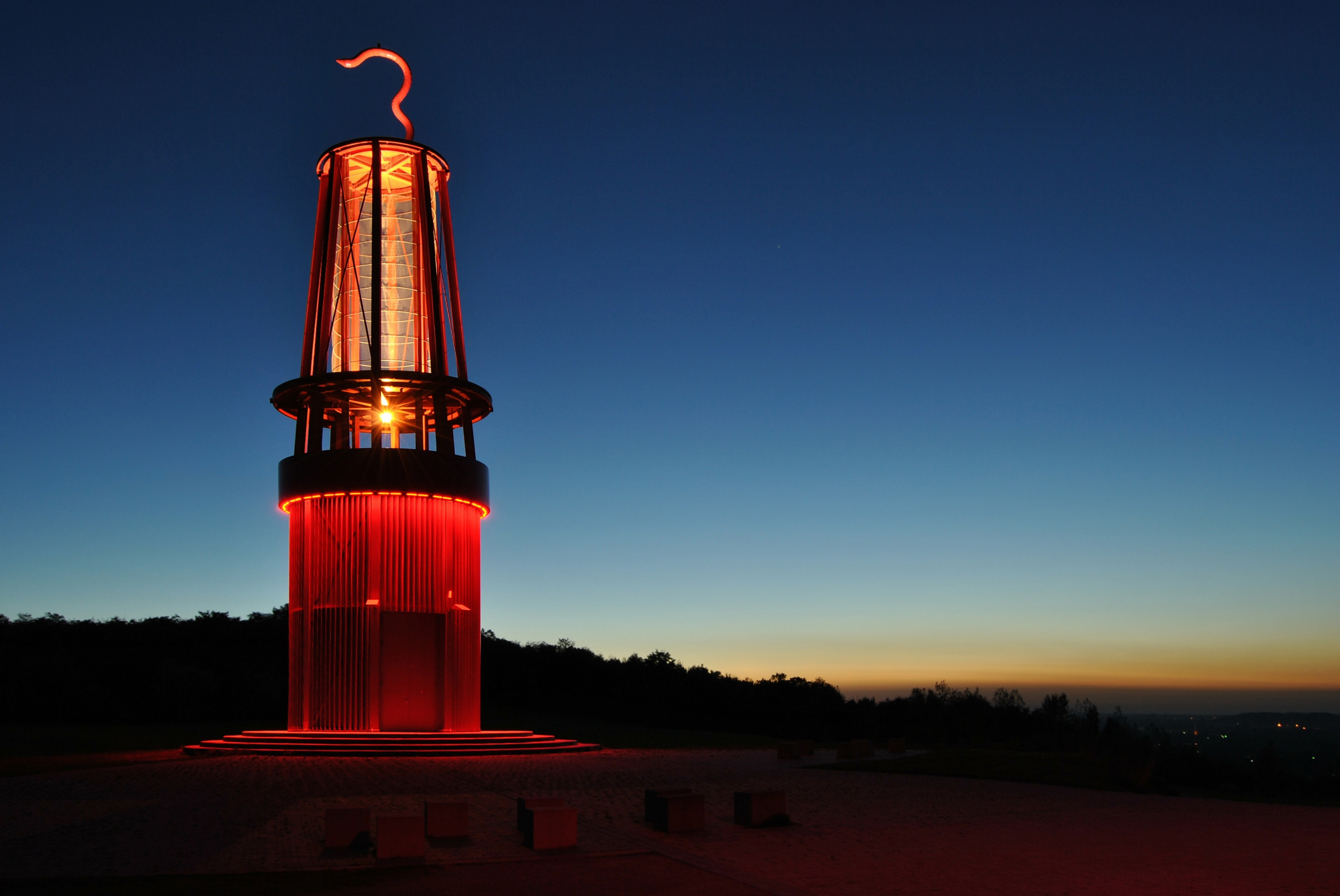
Otto Piene, Das Geleucht (Mining Lamp), steel, glass, LEDs, 30 m high, 1998-2007 (Halde Rheinpreußen, Moers, Germany)

In 1978, Piene was commissioned by the Smithsonian Art Collectors Program to create a print to benefit the educational and cultural programs of the Smithsonian Associates. The print was to commemorate a Washington DC festival much like the 1977 exhibition in Kassel. Three lithographs resulted, all titled, Centerbeam, one of which hung in the exhibition, Graphic Eloquence, in the S. Dillon Ripley Center on the National Mall.

In 1999 in the Ludwig Galerie Schloss Oberhausen, Piene debuted his proposal for a statue called Das Geleucht. This monument in the form of a mining lamp was to be built on the spoil tip Halde Rheinpreußen in Moers, lighting up at night. In 2007 after delays securing funding, the 30-metre (98-foot) high monument illuminated the spoil tip nightly.

In 2011 Piene exhibited new public artworks as part of the Festival of Art, Science, and Technology (FAST) which concluded a year of MIT150 celebrations of MIT's founding in 1861.

== Exhibitions ==
Piene had his first solo exhibition at Galerie Schmela, Düsseldorf, in 1959. With Light Ballet, he debuted at Howard Wise Gallery, New York, in 1966. He represented Germany at the Venice Biennale in 1967 and 1971, and exhibited at documenta in Kassel, Germany, in 1959, 1964 and 1977. In 1985, he exhibited at the São Paulo Biennial.

Piene's solo exhibitions include retrospectives at the Kunstmuseum im Ehrenhof, Düsseldorf, in 1996 and at the Prague City Gallery Prague, in 2002, and a show at the Museum am Ostwall, Dortmund in 2008-2009.

Recent museum solo shows include the MIT List Visual Arts Center, Cambridge (2011); Museum Für Neue Kunst, Karlsruhe (2013); Museum Kunstpalast, Düsseldorf (graphic work) (2013); Neue Nationalgalerie, Berlin (2014); Langen Foundation, Neuss (2014); and LWL-Museum für Kunst und Kultur, Münster (2015).

In 2014, the Guggenheim Museum in New York held an exhibition featuring a survey of the work of the Zero Group, that included many works by Piene.

In 2019 the largest solo show to date, Fire and Light: Otto Piene in Groton, 1983–2014, debuted at the Fitchburg Art Museum near to Piene and Elizabeth Goldring's farm in Groton, Massachusetts. The farm is the location of the Elizabeth Goldring-Otto Piene Foundation.

== Collections ==
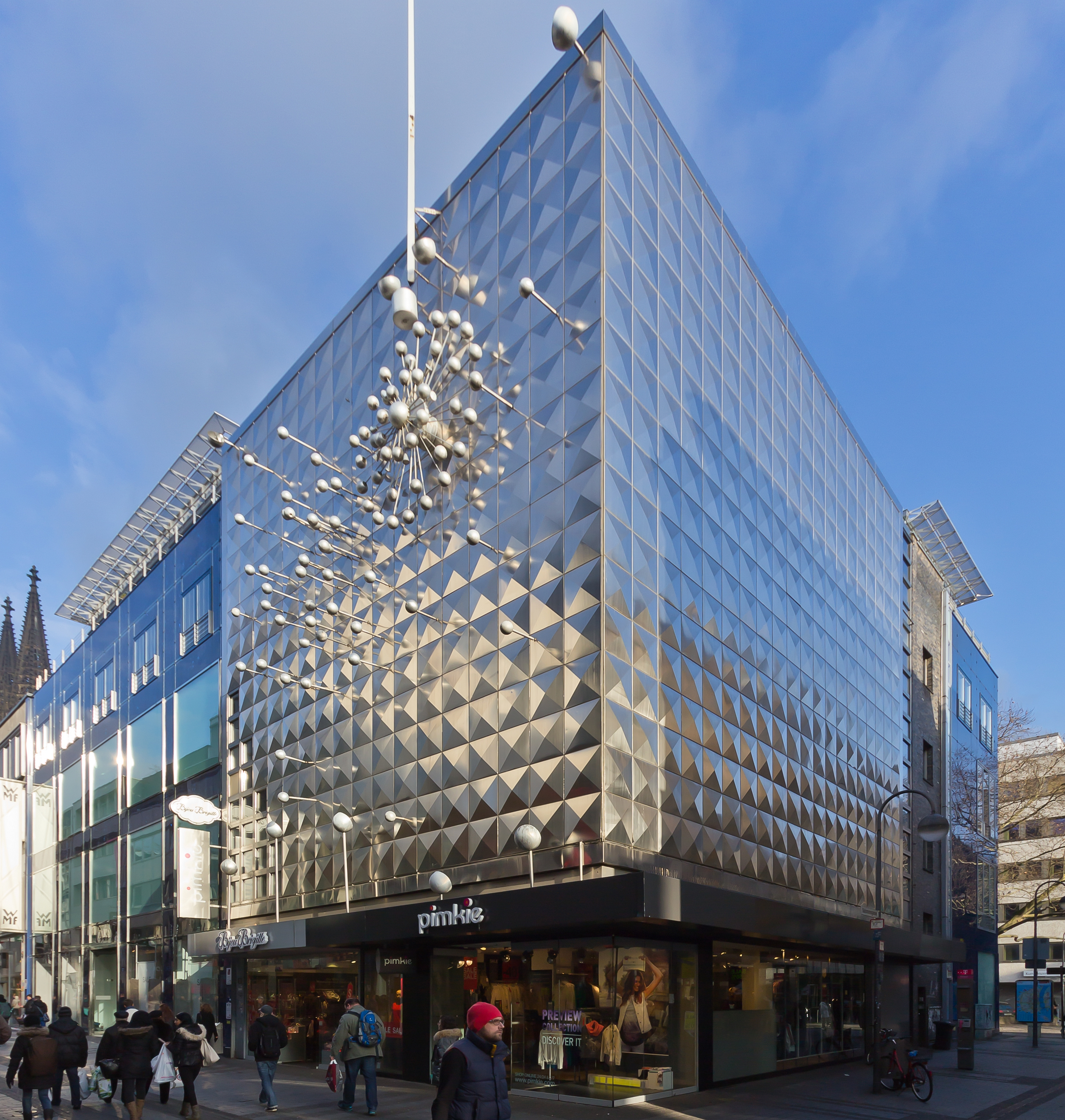
Licht und Bewegung, Cologne, Germany

Piene's works are in more than 200 museum and public collections around the world, among them the Museum of Modern Art in New York, the Walker Art Center in Minneapolis, the National Museum of Modern Art in Tokyo, the Stedelijk Museum in Amsterdam, the Centre Georges Pompidou in Paris, the Harvard Art Museums, and the List Visual Arts Center at MIT.

== Recognition ==
The University of Maryland, Baltimore County awarded Piene an honorary Doctor of Fine Arts in 1994. In 1996, he received the Sculpture Prize of the American Academy of Arts and Letters, New York. In 2003, he became the recipient of the Leonardo da Vinci World Award of Arts in recognition of his artistic and innovative accomplishments. After his death, he was praised by Germany’s minister of culture, Monika Grütters, who said that "many of his highly aesthetic works in public space were also a signal against the inhospitality of our cities".

== Art market ==
Sotheby's established a first record for works by Otto Piene when it sold Rauchbild, a 1961 oil and charcoal on canvas from the Lenz-Schoenberg collection, for £223,250 ($329,000) in February 2010. Only a few months later, Piene's Kleine Sonne (1963–64) was sold for £85,250 ($126,937) by the Lauffs Collection at Christie's London.

== See also ==
- Cai Guo-Qiang – Chinese artist who uses fireworks and burning gunpowder to create art

== Publications ==
- Ante Glibota, Otto Piene, monograph, Delight Edition, Paris-Hong Kong, 2011, 756 pages, English- German edition, ISBN 978-988-19532-2-3
- The Light Silo, with introductive text of Ante Glibota, poems by Elizabeth Goldring and original drawings of Otto Piene, Delight Editions, Paris-Hong Kong, English German edition, 168 pages, 2014, ISBN 978-988-19552-3-4
- Les Nuits d'Héliogabale Ante Glibota (text) Otto Piene (original lithographs), Fernando Arrabal (poems), rare book edition in French, English &German, 2014, Delight Editions, Paris-Hong Kong, ISBN 978-988-19552-0-3
- O.Piene, H.Mack, G.Uecker, ZERO in Europa, First and last common talk with the founders after the end of the group, in: Lettre International, 94, 2011, S. 42–49
- Das Ohr am Tatort. Heinz-Norbert Jocks im Gespräch mit Gotthard Graubner, Heinz Mack, Roman Opalka, Otto Piene und Günther Uecker, hrsg. von Anna Lenz und Ulrike Honich. Hatje Cantz, Ostfildern 2009, ISBN 978-3-7757-2509-5.
- ZERO, Internationale Künstler Avantgarde, exhibition catalog published by Museum Kunst Palast and Cantz, with essays by Jean-Hubert Martin, Valerie Hilling, Catherine Millet and Mattijs Visser, Düsseldorf/Ostfildern 2006, ISBN 3-9809060-4-3
- Artempo, Where Time Becomes Art, exhibition catalog published by Musei Civici Veneziani, with essays by Jean-Hubert Martin, Heinz-Norbert Jocks, Massimo Cacciari, Giandomenico Romanelli and Mattijs Visser, MER Paper Kunsthalle Ghent 2007, ISBN 978-90-76979-47-2
- ZERO in NY, exhibition catalog edited by Mattijs Visser, published by the ZERO foundation and Sperone Westwater, New York/Düsseldorf/Ghent 2008, ISBN 978-90-76979-73-1
- Busch, Julia M., A Decade of Sculpture: the New Media in the 1960s (The Art Alliance Press: Philadelphia; Associated University Presses: London, 1974) ISBN 0-87982-007-1
- Radford, Georgia and Warren Radford, Sculpture in the Sun, Hawaii's Art for Open Spaces, University of Hawaii Press, 1978, 95.
- Claus, Jürgen, "Otto Piene", in: Liebe die Kunst. Eine Autobiografie in einundzwanzig Begegenungen, Kerber Verlag/ZKM, ISBN 978-3-86678-788-9
- “COUNTDOWN TO ZERO” This book is the documentation of Personal Structures Art Projects #10. Published by European Cultural Centre.
