= Douglas Davis (artist) =

American artist (1933–2014)

- Born: April 11, 1933; Washington, D.C., U.S.
- Died: January 16, 2014 (aged 80); Queens, New York, U.S.
- Known for: Video Art, Performance Art, Satellite Art, art criticism
- Movement: Video Art

Douglas Matthew Davis, Jr. (April 11, 1933 – January 16, 2014) was an American artist, critic, teacher, and writer for among other publications Newsweek.

== Artistic career ==
In 1977, at the opening of documenta 6, alongside Nam June Paik and Joseph Beuys, Douglas Davis took part in one of the first international satellite telecasts with his live performance The Last Nine Minutes. Davis received grants for his work by the Rockefeller Foundation, the National Endowment for the Arts & the Trust for Mutual Understanding, among other institutions.

=== Early internet works ===
His exploration of interactivity involving various media continued throughout the 1980s and 1990s. He is the author of one of the earliest art pieces on the World Wide Web, The World's First Collaborative Sentence (1994). His early work is featured on his website, The World's First Collaborative Sentence (1994), with elements from his exhibition InterActions 1967-1981. They include critical essays by Susan Hoeltzel, Michael Govan, David Ross, and Nam June Paik. Commissioned by the Lehman College Art Gallery, the Sentence was given by its collectors, Barbara and Eugene M. Schwartz, to the Whitney Museum of American Art. In 1997, P.S.1/The Institute of Contemporary Art joined with several other museums to host MetaBody (The World's First Collaborative Visions of the Beautiful), commissioned by George Waterman III. In 1997, Davis launched Terrible Beauty, an evolving global multi-media theater piece. Its "chapters" have been performed before audiences in New York, Dublin, San Francisco, and Berlin.

=== Teaching and writing ===
External videos
- Booknotes interview with Davis on The Five Myths of Television Power, or Why the Medium Is Not the Message, May 30, 1993, C-SPAN

Davis taught advanced media at more than 25 universities and art colleges and served as consultant in this field for several corporations & foundations. Davis published the book Art and the Future in several countries in 1973. ArtCulture: Essays on the Post-Modern (1977), is a book of theoretical essays. The Five Myths of TV Power (or, Why the Medium is Not the Message), 1993, focuses on the crucial importance of the viewer, the "human" element in media theory.

=== Personal life ===
Davis lived and worked in New York City until his death on January 16, 2014. He is survived by three daughters, and three granddaughters. His wife of over 30 years, Jane Bell Davis, died in 2005.

== Exhibitions ==
- The Anagrammatic Body, Neue Galerie, Graz, Austria, 1999
- The Net. Condition, Center for Art and Media, Karlsruhe, Germany, 1999
- The American Century, Part II, Whitney Museum, 1999
- Governor's Conference on the Arts and Technology, Information Technology Center, New York (installation), 1998
- P.S. 1/Institute of Contemporary Art, New York (website), 1997
- WithDrawing, Ronald Feldman Fine Arts, New York, 1996
- X-Art Foundation, New York, 1996
- Kwangju Biennale, Korea, 1995
- Museum Sztuki, Lodz, Poland, 1995 (retrospective)
- InterActions (1967–1981), Art Gallery, Lehman College, New York City, 1994
- Discours Amoureux, Galerie St. Gervais, Geneva, 1994
- TranceSex, Amanda Obering Gallery, Los Angeles, 1993
- Ronald Feldman Fine Arts (one-man), 1992, 1985, 1984, 1981, 1980, 1977
- Centro de Arte y Communicacion—Harrod's en Arte, Buenos Aires, 1991
- Kunstverein, Cologne, Germany, 1989
- Solomon R. Guggenheim Museum, 1986, 1988
- Whitney Museum of American Art, (Biennial 1985), 1981, 1977, 1972
- Venice Biennale, 1976, 1978, 1986
- The New Museum, New York City, 1983, 1984
- The Museum of Modern Art, 1983,
- The Hirshhorn Museum & Sculpture Garden, 1983, 1984
- Metropolitan Museum of Art, 1982 (traveling exhibition)
- Wadsworth Atheneum, 1982–1983
- Centre Pompidou, Paris, 1981

== Publications ==
- Essays on the Post-Modern. New York: Harper & Row, 1977. ISBN 978-0-06-431000-0
- The Museum Transformed: Design and Culture in the Post-Pompidou Age. New York: Abbeville Press Publishers, 1990. ISBN 1-55859-064-1
- The Five Myths of Television Power, Or, Why the Medium is Not the Message. Riverside, New Jersey, U.S.A.: Simon & Schuster, 1993. ISBN 978-0-671-73963-8
