= Lowry Burgess =

American artist (1940 - 2020)

Lowry Burgess (1940 – January 28, 2020) was a conceptual and environmental artist and educator. He also was a professor at Carnegie Mellon University, where he was a Distinguished Fellow in the STUDIO for Creative Inquiry. Burgess also served on the Advisory Council of METI (Messaging Extraterrestrial Intelligence).

== Education ==
Burgess was educated at the Pennsylvania Academy of the Fine Arts. He continued his studies at the University of Pennsylvania and at the Instituto Allende in San Miguel de Allende, Mexico.

== Achievements ==
After the destruction of the Buddhas in Bamiyan, Afghanistan, Burgess authored the "Toronto Manifesto, The Right to Human Memory" in 2001. His 1989 piece entitled “Boundless Cubic Lunar Aperture” became the seventh piece of art taken into space by NASA (after the 6 pieces of art in the Moon Museum of 1969).

He received awards from the American Academy of Arts and Letters, the National Institute of Arts and Letters, the Guggenheim Foundation, the Rockefeller Foundation, the National Endowment for the Arts, the Massachusetts Artists Foundation, the Kellogg Foundation, and the Berkmann Fund. His artwork can be found in museums and archives.

== Death ==
Burgess died on January 28 2020, at his home in Melbourne, Florida.
