= Cyberarts =

Cyberarts or cyberart refers to the class of art produced with the help of computer software and hardware, often with an interactive or multimedia aspect.

== Overview ==
The term "cyberarts" is vague and relatively new; nevertheless, much of the work described by this term is rarely described any other way. For instance, a common type of cyberart which is produced programmatically by applying a set of design rules to a natural or preexisting process. A program could produce a few million such 'works of art' in a minute.

The word "CyberArts" is claimed as a registered trademark by Miller Freeman Inc., promoter of a series of multi-media technology conferences known as CyberArts International during the early 1990s.

"Recent works of bioart propose to connect the viewer, transformed into a user, with different biological organisms by pirating their biometric data using digital interfaces. These immersive aesthetic propositions are based on a plural conception of the human body, forged in the crucible of cybernetics. Their new modes of communication explore the alternative path of an ecological continuum where the user enters a becoming-cyborg, far from the classic representations of human-machine coupling. They encourage us to reconsider the notion of bioart, in favor of cyberart."

== See also ==
- Digital art, computer art, Internet art, electronic art, new media art, Virtual art
- electronica, techno
- Ars Electronica
- Boston Cyberarts Festival
- CyberArts International
