= Ars Electronica =

Austrian cultural, educational and scientific institute

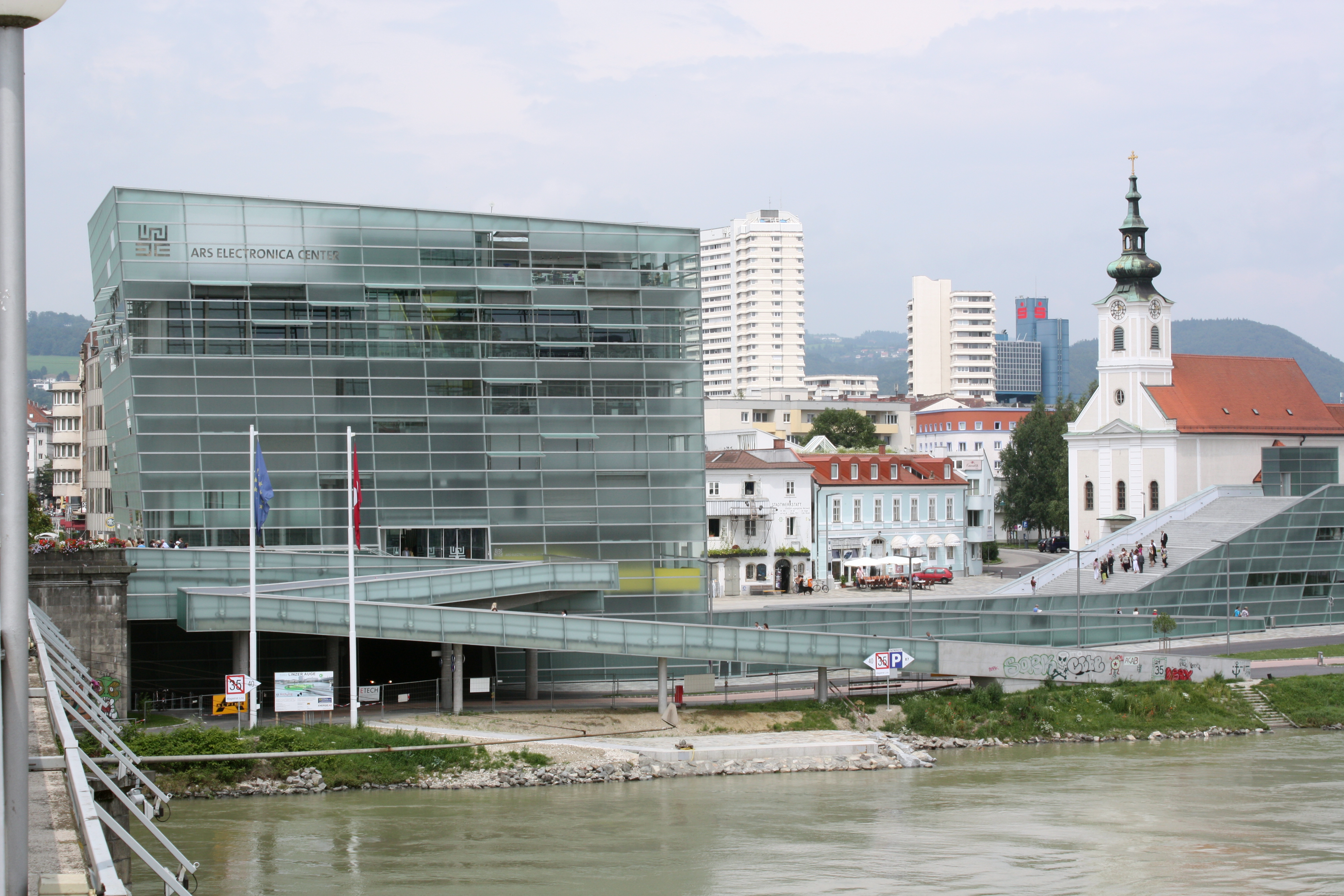
Ars Electronica Center by the Danube

Ars Electronica Linz GmbH is an Austrian cultural, educational and scientific institute active in the field of new media art, founded in Linz in 1979. It is based at the Ars Electronica Center (AEC), which houses the Museum of the Future, in the city of Linz.

Ars Electronica's activities focus on the interlinkages between art, technology and society. It runs an annual festival, and manages a multidisciplinary media arts R&D facility known as the Futurelab. It also confers the Prix Ars Electronica awards.

== History ==
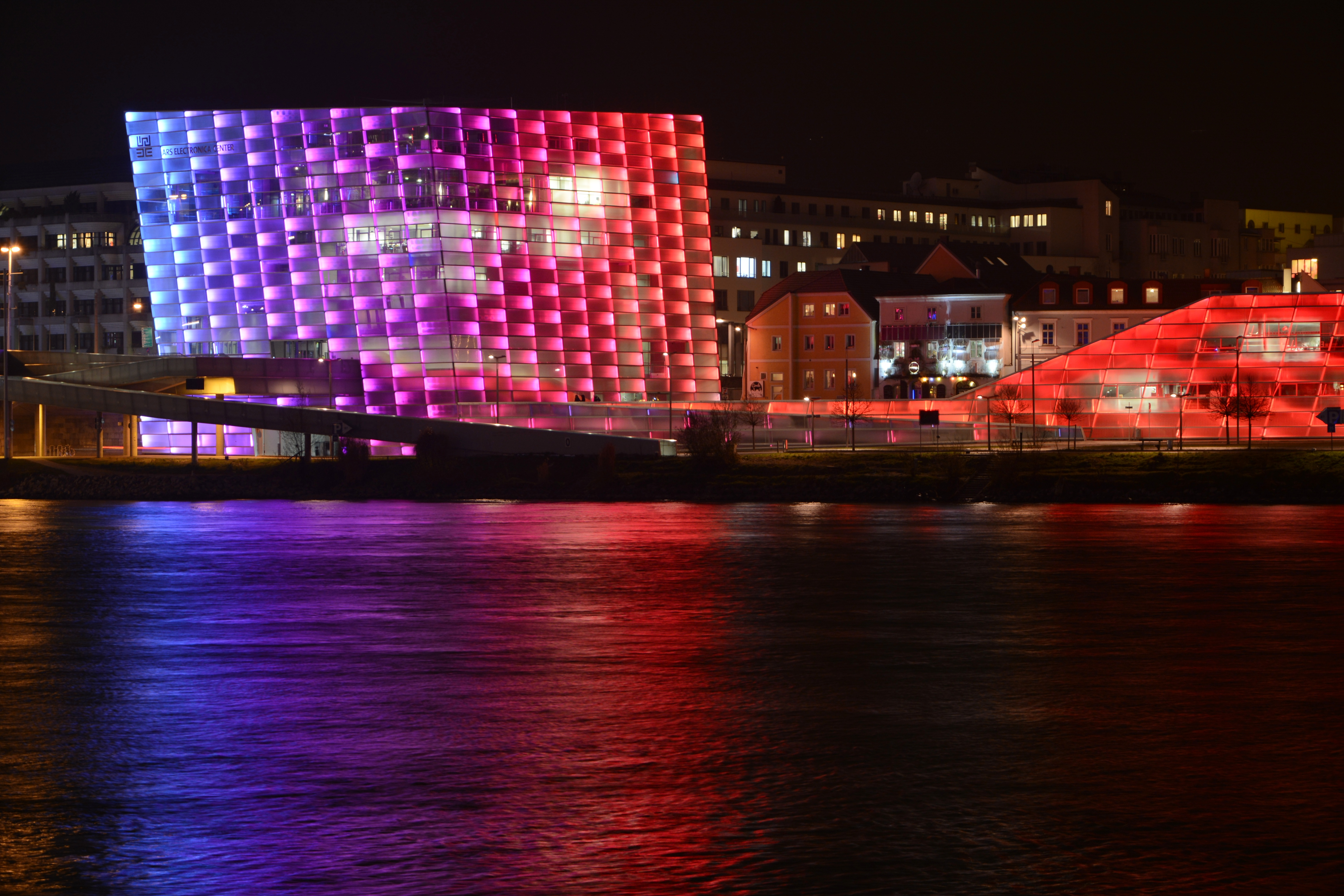
Night view of the center

Ars Electronica began with its first festival in September 1979. Its founders were Hannes Leopoldseder, Hubert Bognermayr, Herbert W. Franke, and Ulrich Rützel. The festival was held biennially at first, and annually since 1986. The Prix Ars Electronica was inaugurated in 1987 and has been awarded every year since then. Ars Electronica Linz GmbH was incorporated as a limited company in 1995. The Ars Electronica Center, together with the Futurelab, opened in 1996, and was remodeled in 2009.

Funding is provided by the City of Linz, the Province of Upper Austria and the Republic of Austria, in addition to private partners. Since 2014, the organization has been headed by artistic director Gerfried Stocker and financial director Diethard Schwarzmair.

=== Museum exhibits ===
The top of the AEC is called the Sky Media Loft, which is mainly used as a coffee house or bar of the museum. It can also be rented out for meetings or events. The bar has occasionally been used as the studio for the newscast of the local TV branch of the Austrian national TV organization ORF. The specialty of the Sky Media Loft is the marvelous view over the Nibelungenbrücke and the main place of Linz at the other side of the Danube which functions as background of the newscasts.

The second floor is where people can interact with exhibits. There are Musicbottles containing different types of music or Pingpongplus which is a table tennis game on a desk with virtual water on its surface.

The first floor has displays about the world that had been hidden from our eyes. In the "Hidden Worlds" various machines are translating voice and words into virtual symbols or colors, and everyday life articles can be moved on a screen if they are touched.

The little room between the first and the ground floor one of the main attractions is offered. The flight simulator "Humphrey" uses virtual reality goggles to give users a simulated view of the flight and the person taking the trip is connected to the computer by cables fixed all over the body. It is possible to fly everywhere and to see the movements of the hands, feet, and the landscape if the visitor raises the head or looks down.

The entrance or the so-called "Login Gateway" of the museum is on the ground floor and leads the newcomer directly to the Telegarden, where a robot is looking after a flower patch. Every ticket is provided with a bar code that gives information about the time the visitor entered the museum. After the visit, the ticket can be put into a computer near the exit and it gives statistic information about the things that happened in the world during the span of the stay in the AEC. The list that is printed out gives information about how many people died or were born during that time or how many accidents have been caused by drunken drivers.

The last floor is called Virtual Reality and it can be found in the basement of the building. The CAVE is another attraction of the museum. The cube with 3 meters side length is used as a screen to project the virtual world. There are always groups of about 10 that dive into a world where physical laws do not have any meaning. Additionally, the 3D spectacles give the impression of a bodyful environment.

== Museum 2009–present ==
The new Ars Electronica Center, which was designed by Treusch architecture ZT GmbH, opened its doors on 2 January 2009 after roughly two years of construction work and an approximate cost of 30 million euros. It now has 3000 square meters for exhibitions, 100 m^{2} for research and development, 400 m^{2} for workshops and conferences, 650 m^{2} for catering and another 1000 m^{2} of public space for various types of events.

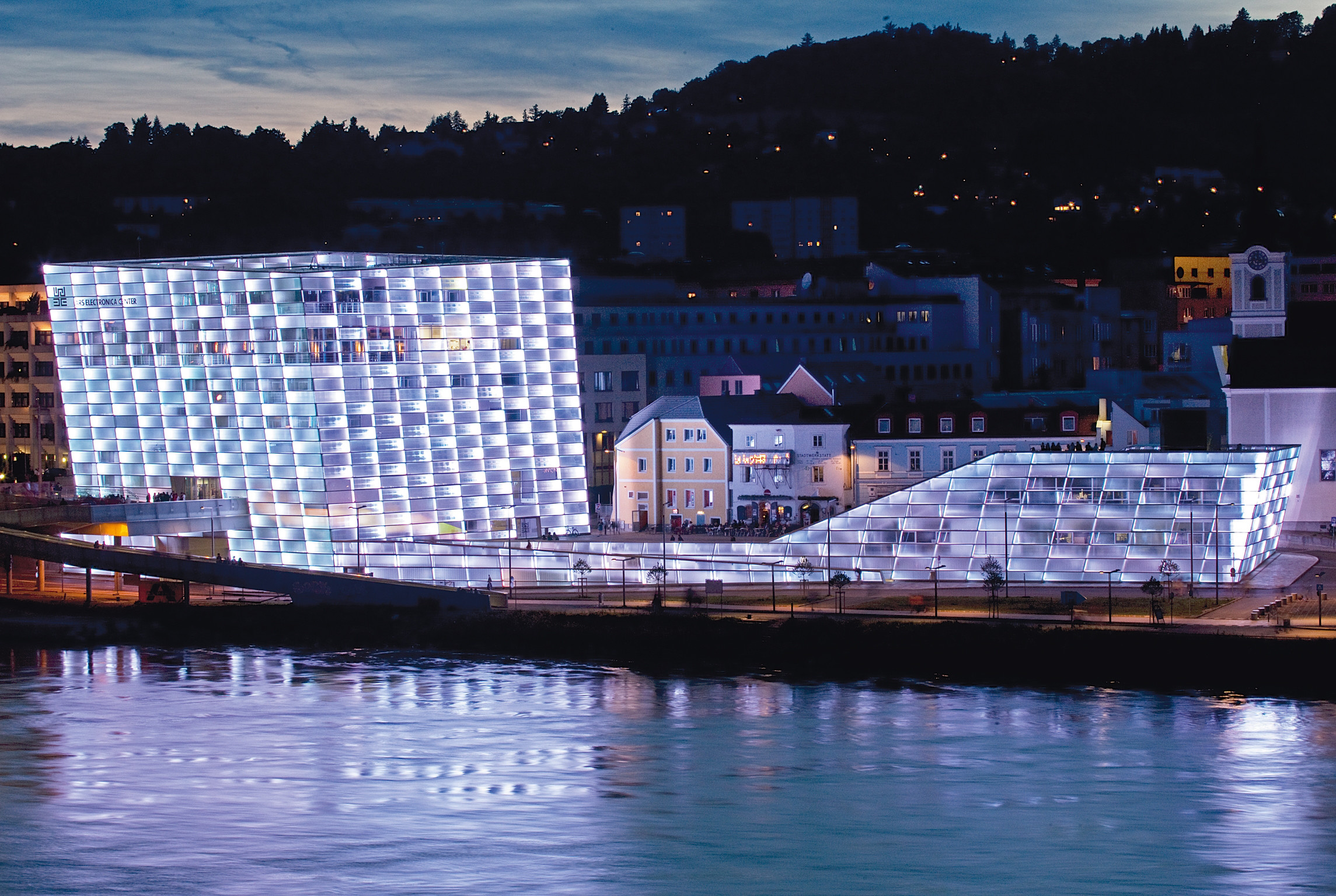
Ars Electronica Center in Linz, Austria is an ESO outreach partner organization.

The new AEC consists of the original building, a new "twin-tower", the main exhibition hall called Main Gallery and the new space for the Ars Electronica Futurelab. The whole building is covered with a 5000-square-meter glass skin that consists of 1100 glass panels. Each panel is equipped with an LED bar that allows it to change its color. Therefore, the whole building acts as a giant display. Artists can create their own visualizations which will be shown on various occasions, especially during the Ars Electronica Festival.

The restaurant is located on the third floor of the new building and is called CUBUS, referring to the building's cubic shape.

=== Museum exhibits ===
With the new building came a new thematic orientation inside of Ars Electronica. Life sciences, global developments (e.g. climate change, population growth, environmental pollution) and the exploration of the universe are just a view of various new topics. The museum can be separated into the following areas:

==== Main Gallery ====
The Main Gallery with approximately 1000 square meters houses the main exhibition called New Views of Humankind, which focuses on topics like biotechnology, robotics, rapid prototyping and the human body. It is separated into the following four so-called "labs":

- Brain-Lab focuses on the human brain, perception and advances in medicine.
- Bio-Lab focuses on biotechnology and its applications.
- Fab-Lab deals with new possibilities offered by 3D printers and rapid prototyping.
- Robo-Lab deals with robotica as well as different prothetic systems.

Main Gallery contains a special area for children which is not thematically connected to the main exhibition.

==== Geo City ====
Geo City focuses on global developments caused by humankind, like growth in population and the extraction of natural resources. Those global developments are connected with possible local reactions, which is visualized in an interactive city information system called Sim-Linz.

==== Artists, Creators, Engineers ====
This is the area for temporary exhibitions on the first and second floor of the original building and focuses on the interdisciplinary aspects of Ars Electronica and its contributors.

==== Deep Space ====
The Deep Space is a multifunctional presentation room that offers a wide range of possibilities. It consists of two walls (front and floor) with dimensions of 16 × 9 meters which serve as screens for eight Galaxy NH-12 projectors by Barco. The projects range from high-resolution videos to scientific (3D) visualizations like a flight out from the Solar System to the whole known universe and artistic projects.

== FutureLab ==
The same building holds the Ars Electronica FutureLab, a place for researching and trying out new cyberarts technologies. See also the Prix Ars Electronica, a yearly award ceremony given out by Ars Electronica at their cyberarts festival. Since 2004, one of the awards at the Prix Ars Electronica brings a young innovator or team of innovators to the FutureLab for a summer to develop a budding idea or technology in electronic media.

== Festival ==
Ars Electronica Festival
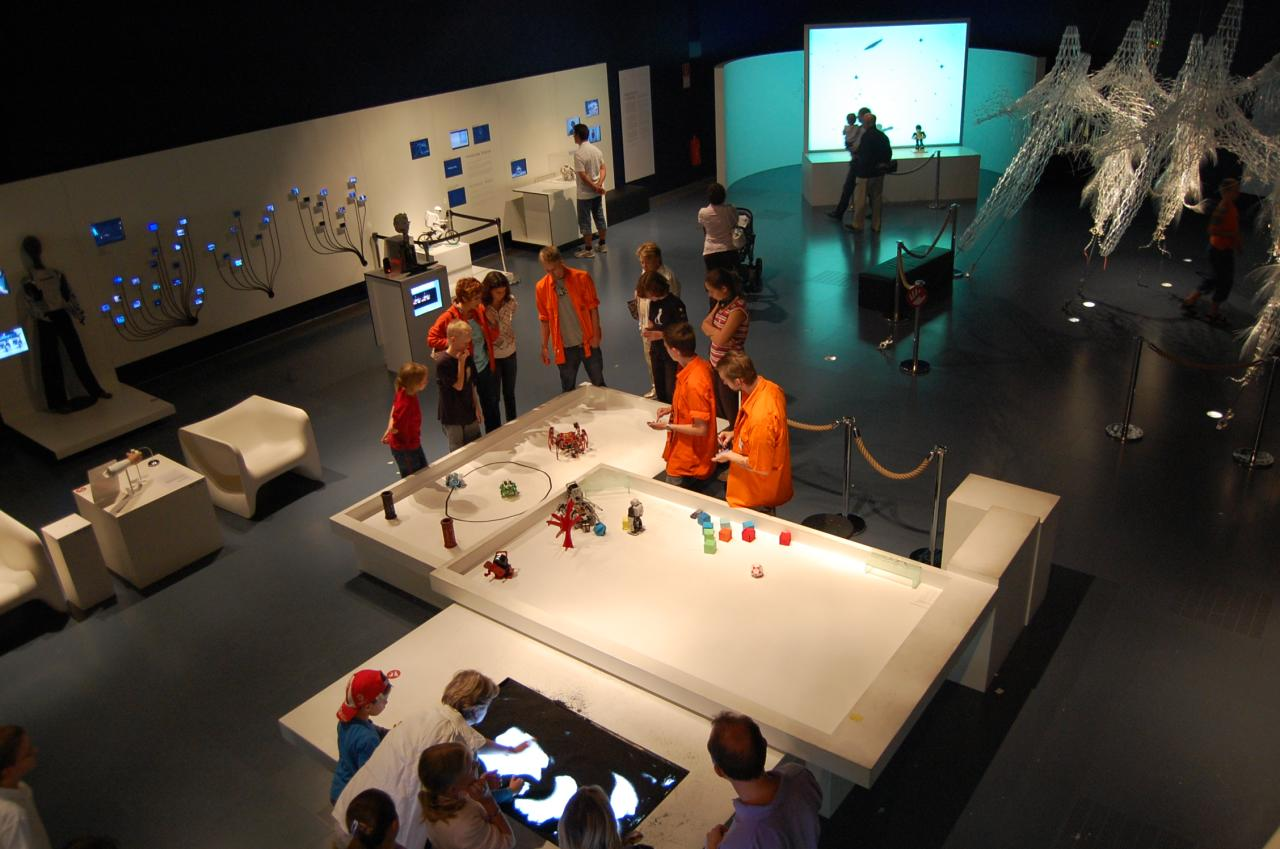
- Ars Electronica, 2009
- Genre: Electronic music, art
- Location: Austria
- Years active: 1979–present
- Founders: Ars Electronica
- Website: Ars Electronica website

The annual Ars Electronica Festival is a gathering of artists, scientists and technologists, intended as "a setting for experimentation, evaluation and reinvention". The festival has always exerted a public presence in Linz, mounting large-scale open-air projects and holding lectures, discussions and workshops in a wide range of public venues.

Each year the festival is devoted to a specific theme. The festival in 2014, had as its theme "C... What it Takes to Change", i.e. ways in which social change and innovation can be promoted. It attracted 579 participants and about 85,000 visitors.

=== Features at the 2014 festival ===
==== Device art ====
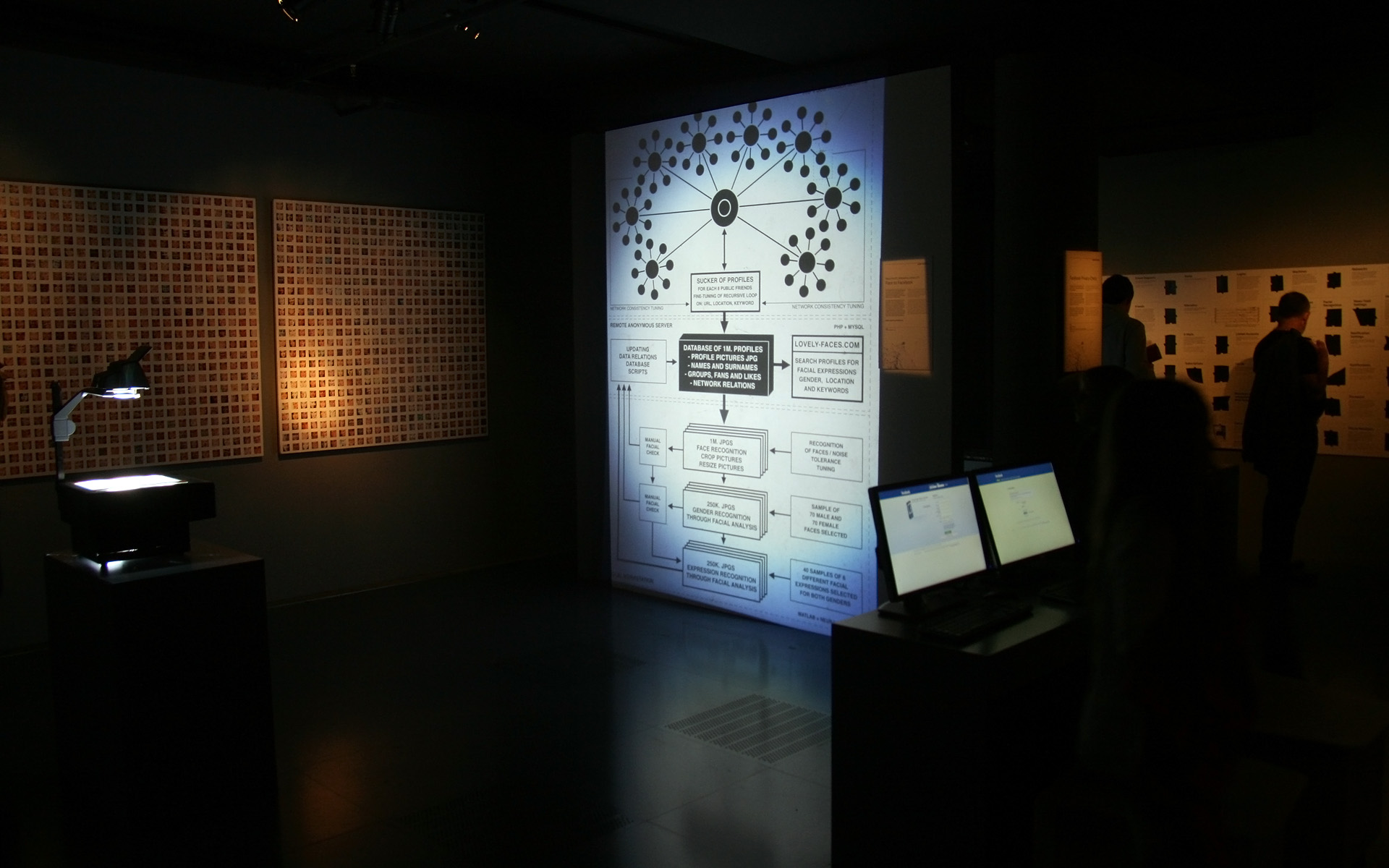
"Außer Kontrolle" (Out of Control), exhibit at the center during Ars Electronica 2012

A form of concept art, device art has been described as "a rebellion of form, taking everyday objects and inverting them to tell you something different". Among the examples exhibited at the 2014 festival were:

- "Otamatone" – a musical instrument shaped like a musical note.
- "Infinite Screen – Everything We See Could also Be Otherwise" – an intermedial artwork cycle by artists duo Arotin And Serghei.
- "Food Simulator", in which a pressure sensor in the user's mouth simulates the sensation of chewing food.
- "Lenticular Bicycle" – an old fashioned bicycle with a screen carousel mounted above the handlebars, known as "Sustainable Cinema No. 2" and created by Scott Hessels.
- A robot that performs street begging, made from recycled computer parts, with a voice and robotic hands.
- "Touchy", a "human camera", devised by the Hong Kong-based artist Eric Suiss.

==== Smart atoms (spaxels) ====
A version called "Smart atoms: spaxels version" was developed by Ars Electronica Futurelab and shown at the 2014 festival.

== Prix Ars Electronica ==
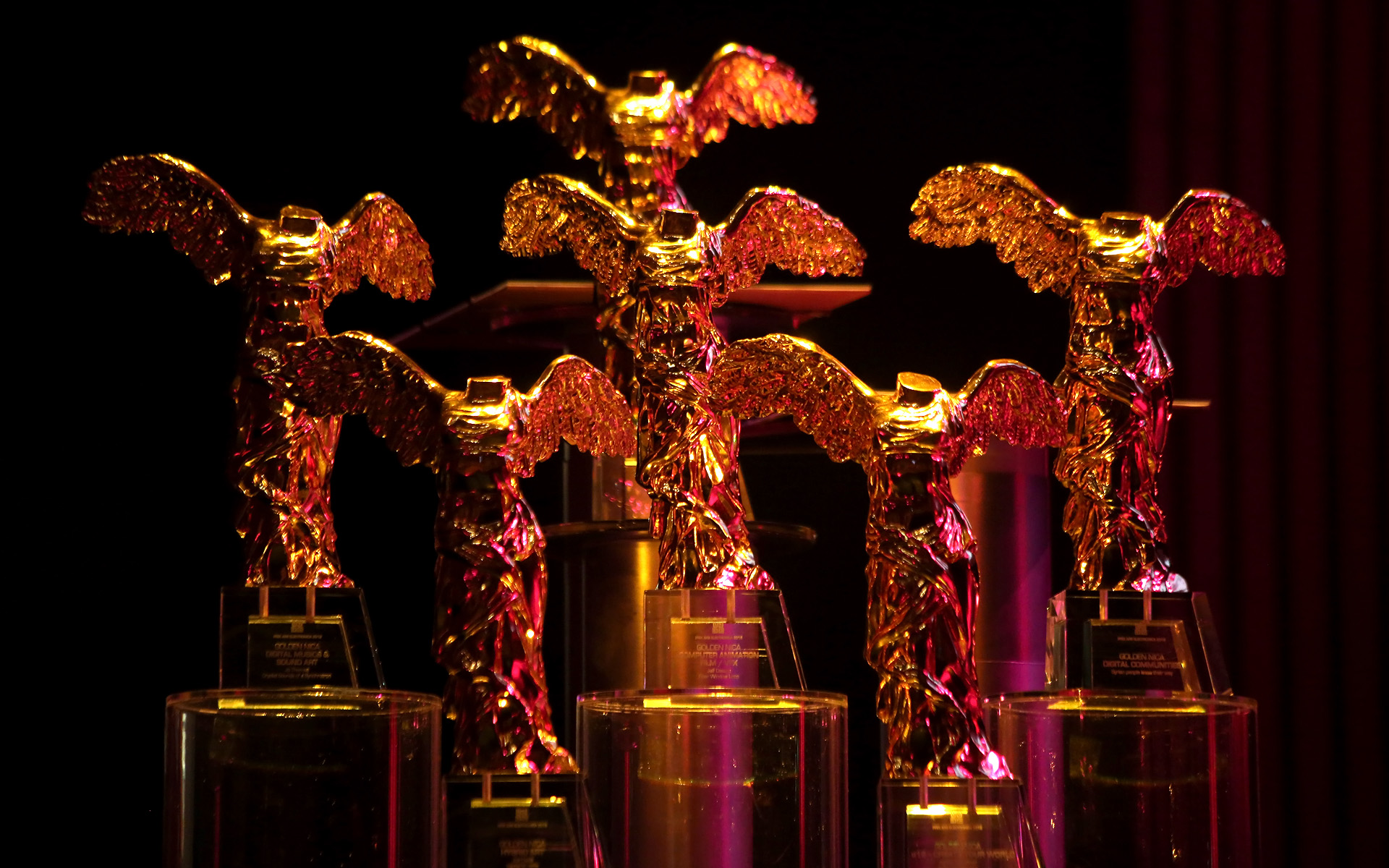
Golden Nica statuettes

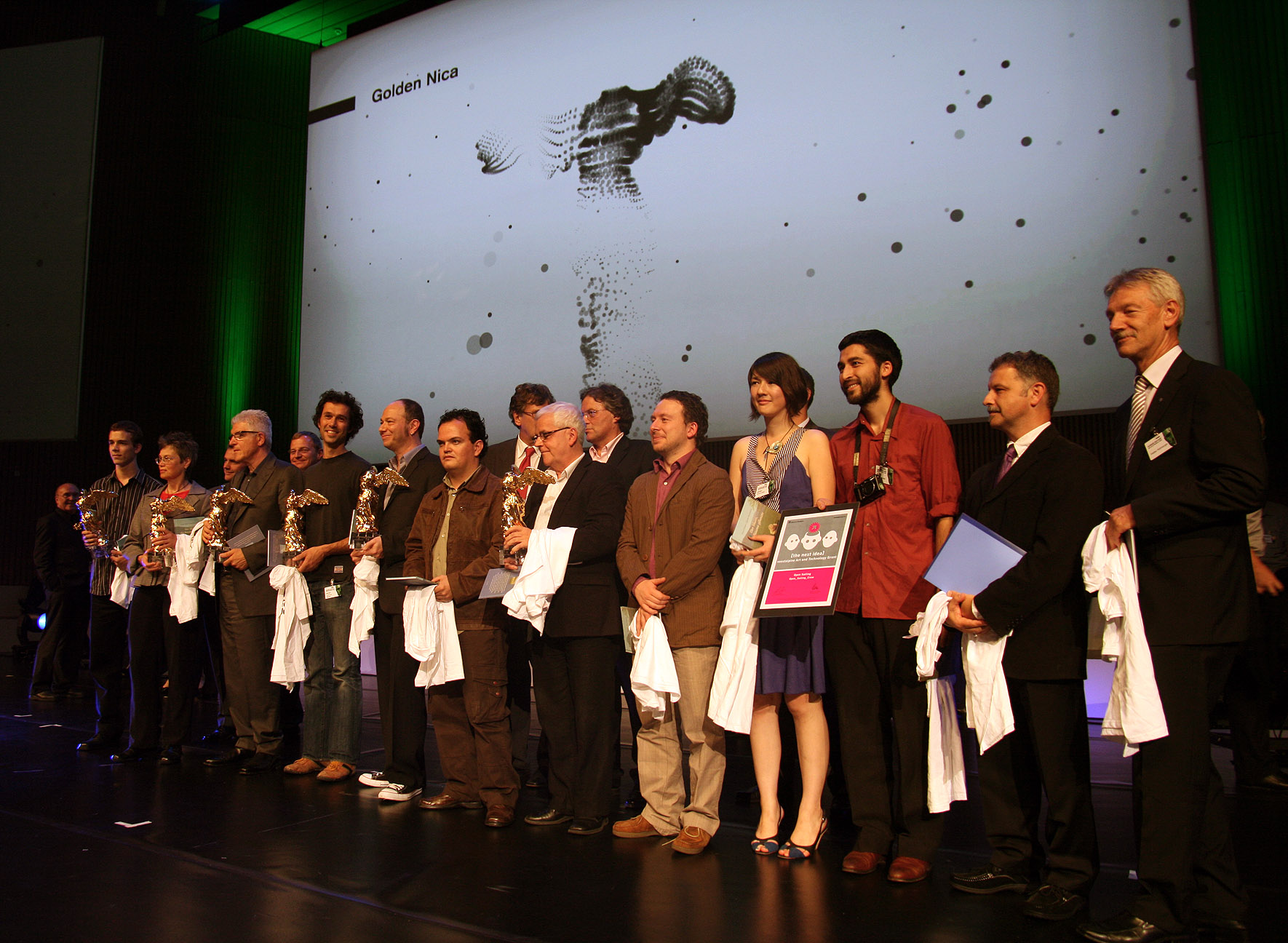
Prize winners in 2009

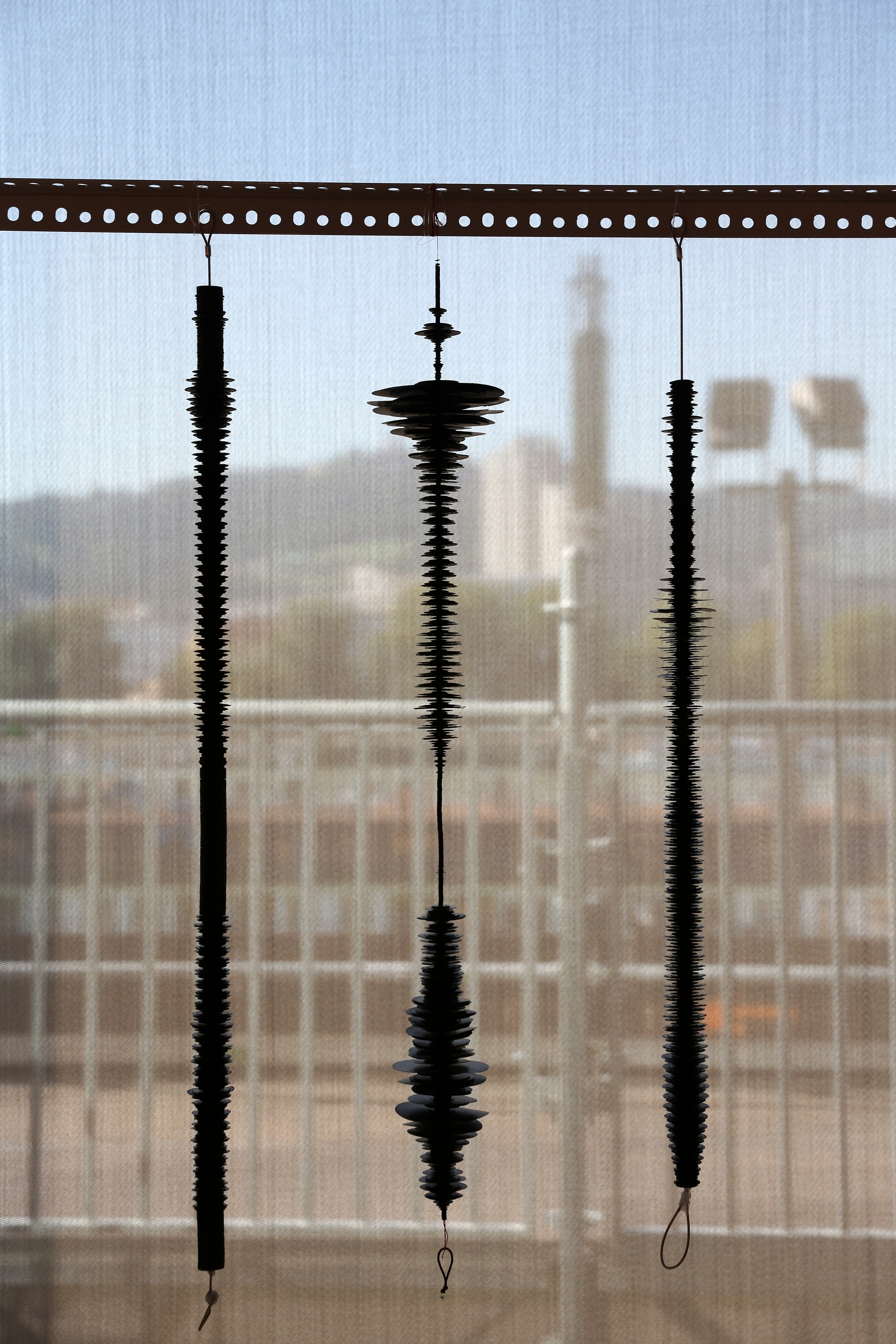
Wave Form Media, three-dimensional representations of sound waves, at Ars Electronica 2013

The Prix Ars Electronica is an annual award made in several categories, "honoring creativity and innovativeness in the use of digital media". Award winners are selected by a five-person international expert jury, who may themselves propose candidates. The prize may be awarded to individuals or to teams or organizations, and may be awarded for a specific work of art or for another form of innovation. Grover (2008) has described the top-ranking award, the Golden Nica, as "the Oscar of digital art".

The prize was first awarded in 1987, and there have been several changes in the categories since then. In 2014, there were 2,703 entries from 77 countries. All entries remain on display in an online archive, the Prix Ars Electronica Showcase, containing over 55,000 items.

=== Award categories ===
Awards of the Golden Nica (worth 10,000 euros), Awards of Distinction, and Honorary Mentions are made in the following categories:

- Computer animation / Film / VFX (First presented in 1987)
- U19 Create Your World (First presented in 1998)
- Visionary Pioneers of Media Art
- Interactive Art (Note: To be awarded biennially from 2014. (First presented in 1990))
- Digital Music & Sound Art
- Hybrid Art (First presented in 2007)
- Digital Communities (First presented in 2004)
- Artificial Intelligence & Life Art (First presented in 2019)

Note:

There is also a grant scheme to honor and support ideas of exceptional promise. It is known as "[the next idea] voestalpine Art and Technology Grant".

=== Some notable award winners ===
- 1987: "Luxo Jr.", dir. John Lasseter of Pixar (Golden Nica – Computer Animation).
- 1990: "Videoplace", by Myron Krueger (Golden Nica – Interactive Art)
- 1992 "Home of the Brain", by Monika Fleischmann & Wolfgang Strauß (Golden Nica – Interactive Art)
- 1994: "Jurassic Park", by Dennis Muren, Mark Dippé and Steve Williams (Golden Nica – Computer Animation)
- 1999: "The Difference Engine #3", by Lynn Hershman (Golden Nica – Interactive Art)
- 2004: Wikipedia (Golden Nica– Digital Communities)
- 2005: Processing, a programming language and environment designed for the electronic arts (Golden Nica – Net Vision)
- 2007: SymbioticA, University of Western Australia Art and Science Collaborative Research Laboratory (Golden Nica – Hybrid Art)
- 2008: The Reactable by Sergi Jordà and others (Golden Nica – Digital Music)
- 2009: WikiLeaks (Award of Distinction – Digital Communities)

== Ars Electronica Center ==
The Ars Electronica Center (AEC) is housed in a modern complex of buildings by the Danube. It acts as Ars Electronica's permanent base and showcase. The majority of the space is used for public exhibitions and events, with an emphasis on interactivity and participation. Major themes are life sciences, environmental issues, and preparation for impending technological developments with likely impacts on society.

There is also provision for conferences, workshops, and R&D. The center was enhanced and expanded in 2009, coincident with Linz's term as European Capital of Culture. It is the most-visited museum in Linz.

== Ars Electronica Futurelab ==
The Futurelab, housed at the Ars Electronica Center, is a center of expertise for multidisciplinary research and development of new cyberarts technologies. It is staffed by about 35 permanent team members, and offers residencies to established and emerging artists and researchers.

The Futurelab has produced infrastructure and content for the Center and Festival. More recently it has engaged in art&science projects with universities and the private sector.

=== Spaxels ===
The spaxels ("space pixels") have been shown publicly as a world premiere in 2012 by Ars Electronica Futurelab. Spaxels are the single elements that form a drone display. Automatically controlled drones fitted with LEDs (= spaxels), fly in formation to create apparent three-dimensional objects against the night sky. Spaxel ref. Wiktionary

== Comment ==
Trent Nathaniel Grover has included an appendix about Ars Electronica in his book Dream of the Techno-Shaman (2008). He describes the institute's activities as "a unique platform for exploring, discussing, tracking, and analyzing the interrelation between art, technology, and society". Such work, he argues, affirms the place of the human being at the center of techno-cultural processes, as "beneficiaries, victims, and, above all, creators and appliers of new technology". Noting that the rapid pace of technological innovation has profound implications for culture and society, he presents the role of Ars Electronica as working to integrate developments in technology with art and society to the benefit of all, and contrasts this perspective with the Modernist call for "art for art's sake".

Grover concludes by hoping that Ars Electronica "will be able to maintain its ongoing quest for innovation and expansion so that we can all benefit from and further involve ourselves in the integration of art, technology, and society".

== Publications ==
Grover (2008) has described the published work of Ars Electronica as "a compelling snapshot of codependent technological and artistic development with expansive and lasting social and cultural impact."

- Cyberarts 98: .net, Interactive Art, Computer Animation/Visual Effects, Computer Music, U19/Cybergeneration. Edition 98 (German and English Edition). Published by Springer (1998). ISBN 9783211831359.
- Ars Electronica: Facing the Future: A Survey of Two Decades (Electronic Culture: History, Theory, and Practice). Published by The MIT Press (1999). ISBN 9780262041768.
- Digital Avant-Garde: Celebrating 25 Years of Ars Electronica. Published by Ars Electronica, Linz (2004)
- Ars Electronica 2008: A New Cultural Economy – The Limits of Intellectual Property. Published by Hatje Cantz (2008). ISBN 9783775722247.
- Ars Electronica 2013, edited by Hannes Leopoldseder, Christine Schöpf, Gerfried Stocker. Published by Hatje Cantz(2014). ISBN 9783775736305.

== Gallery ==
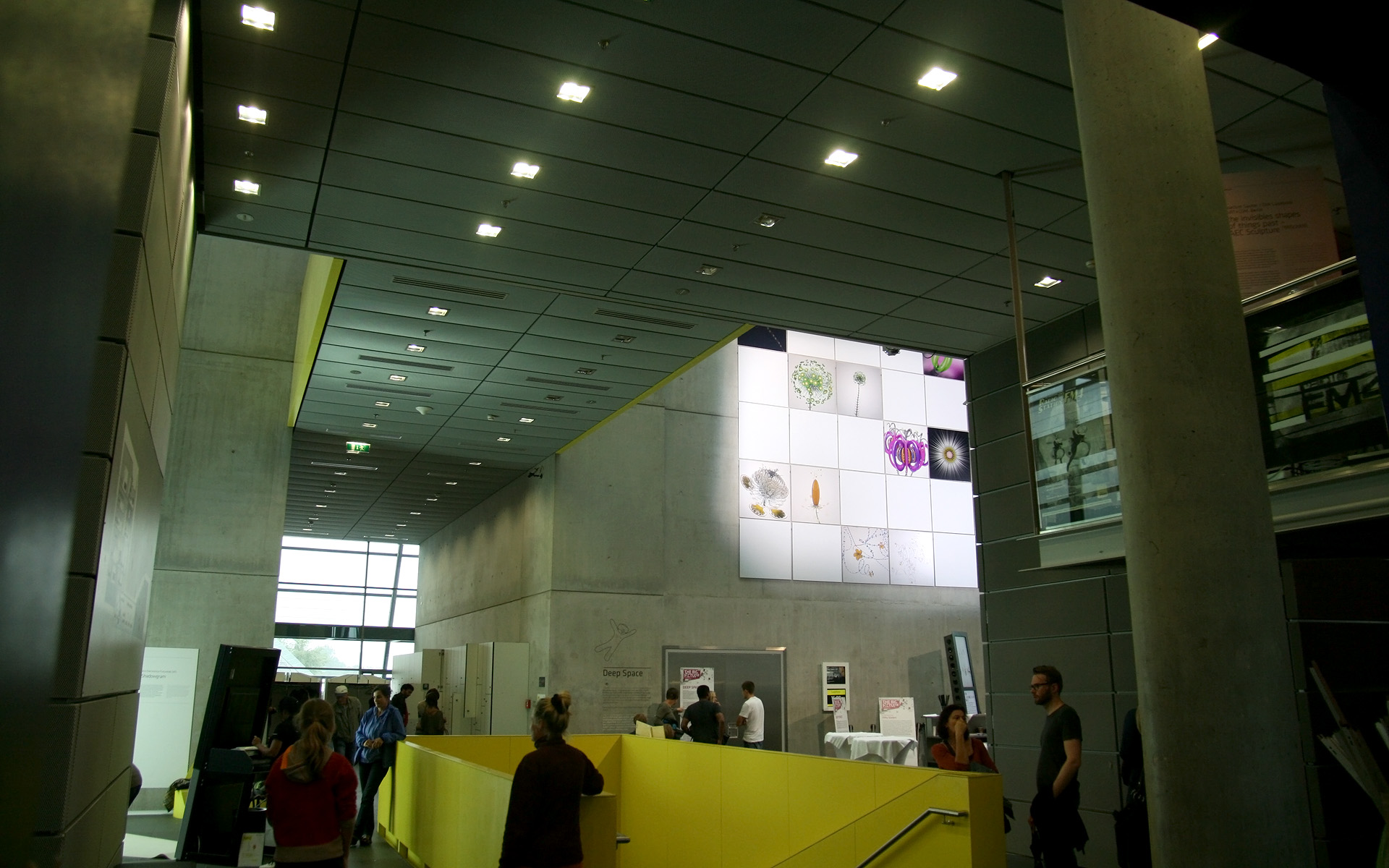
The center during the 2012 festival

Margot's Other Cat, by Arthur Ganson, exhibit in Museum of the Future, 2009

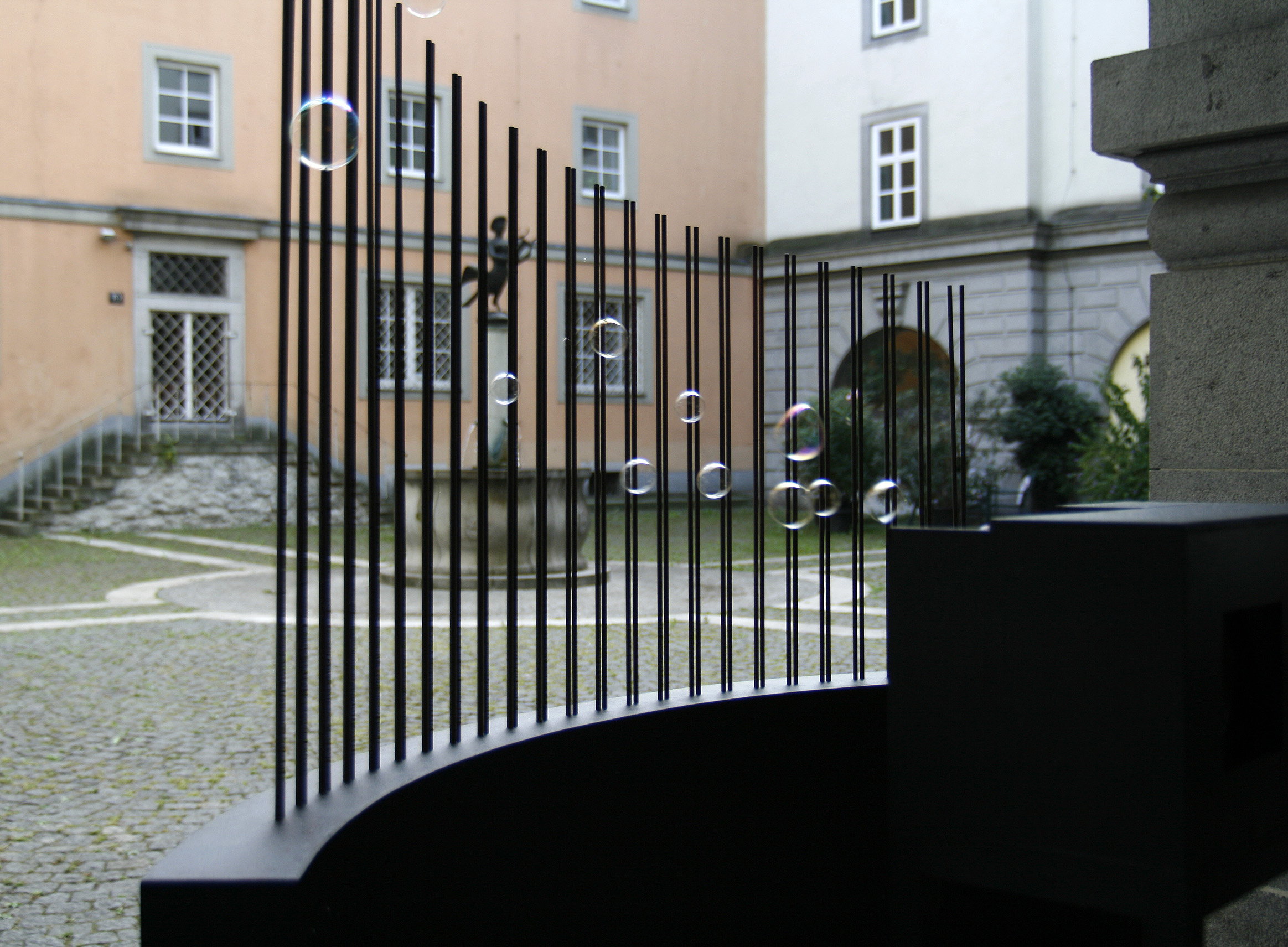
Ephemeral Melody, a musical instrument created at the University of Tokyo, on show at the 2008 festival

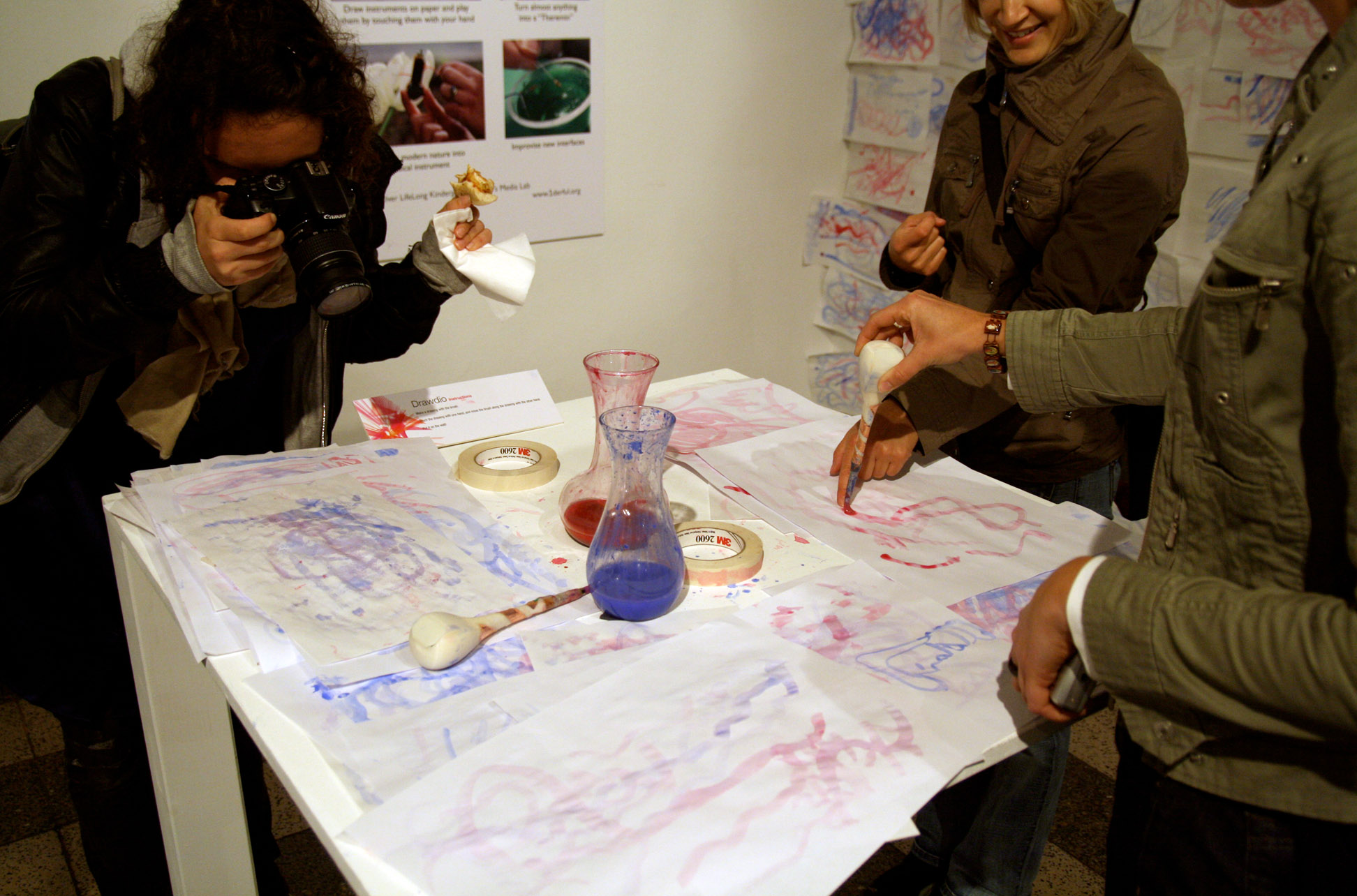
IMPETUS, by MIT Media Lab, at the 2009 festival

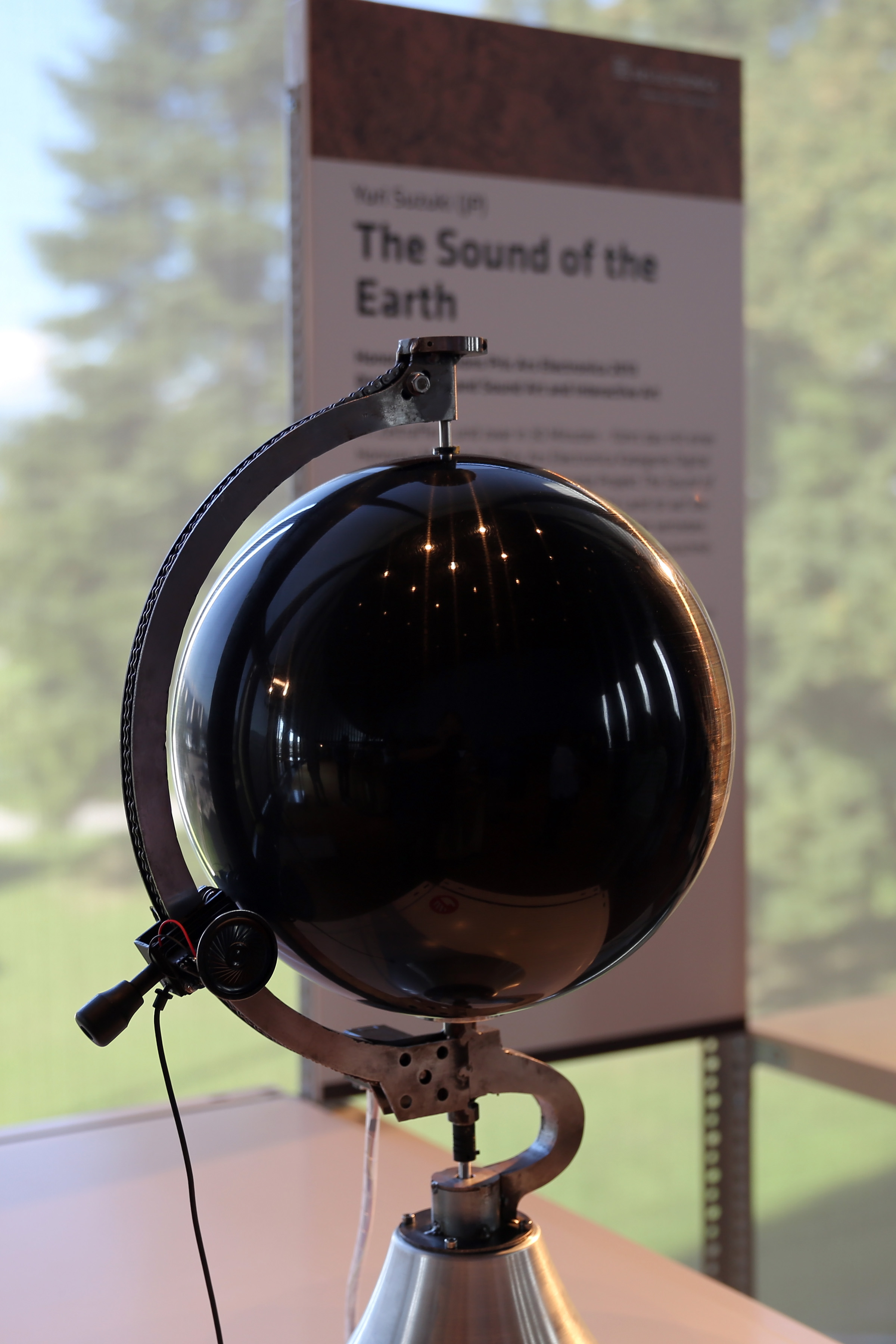
"The Sound of the Earth", 2013 festival

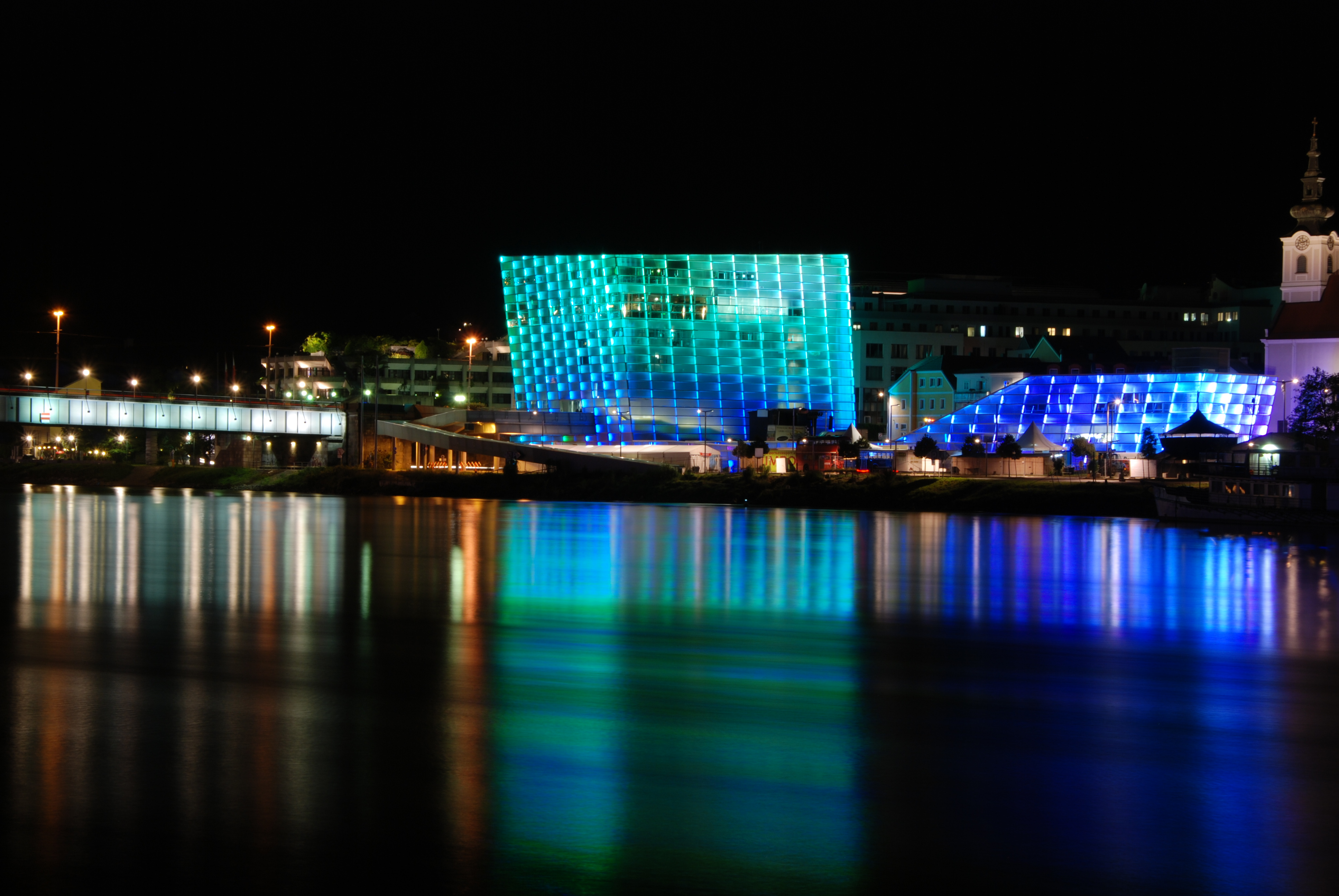
The Ars Electronica Center at night

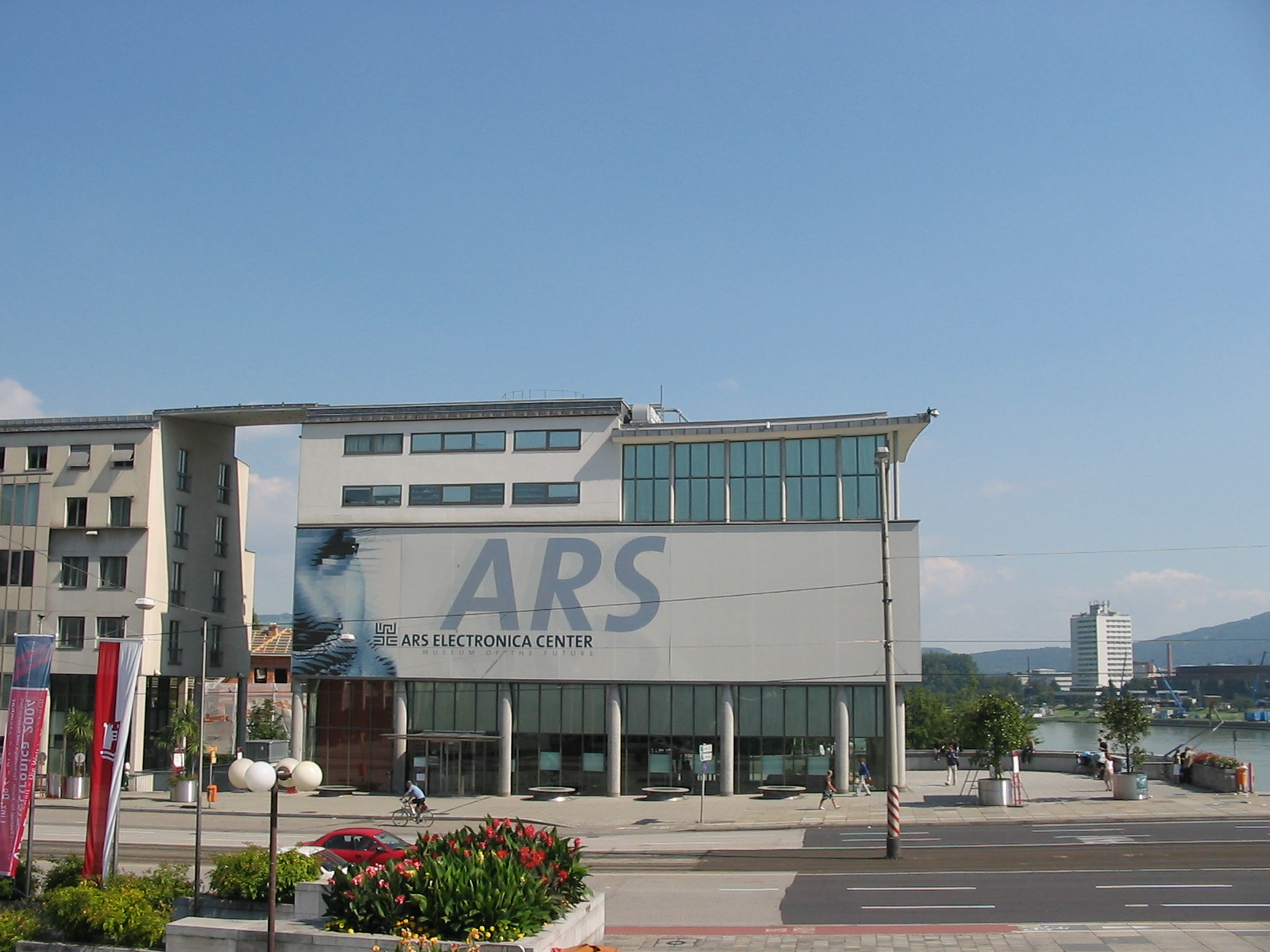
Ars Electronica Center before the reconstruction in the daytime

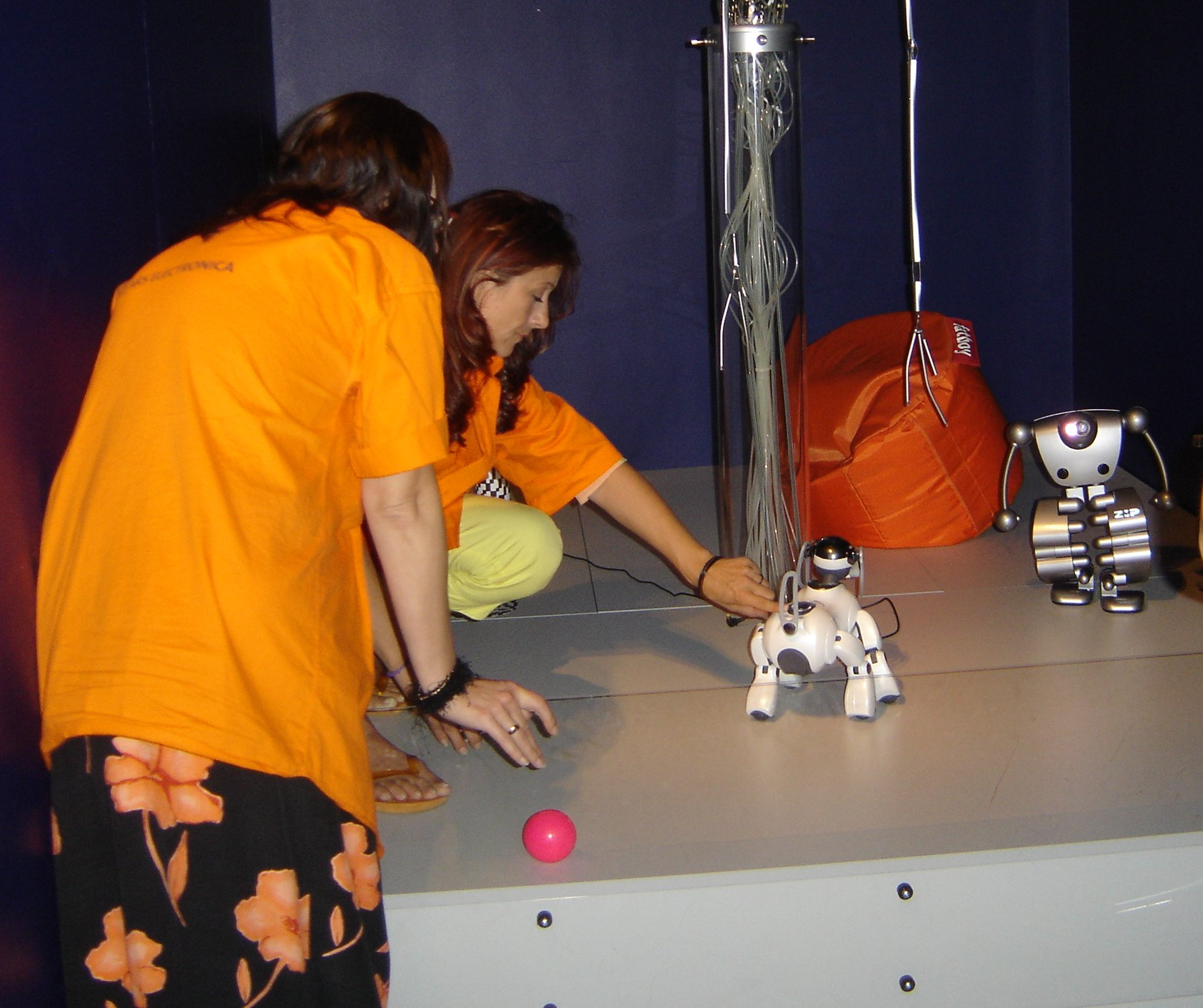
Members of the center staff demonstrate some entertainment robots.

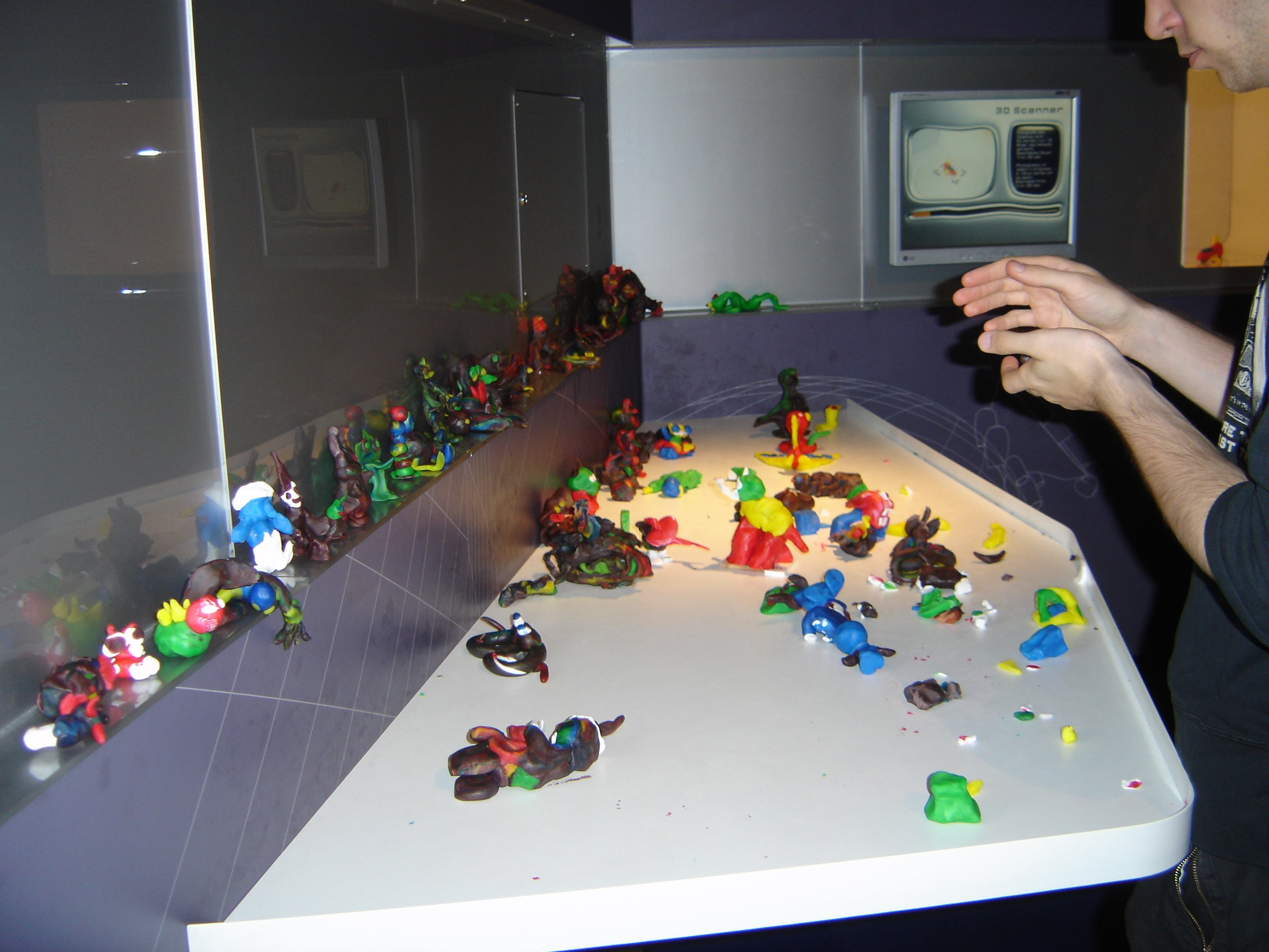
An AEC visitor models a clay figure that they can then insert into a 3D scanner, for use in multiple virtual worlds.

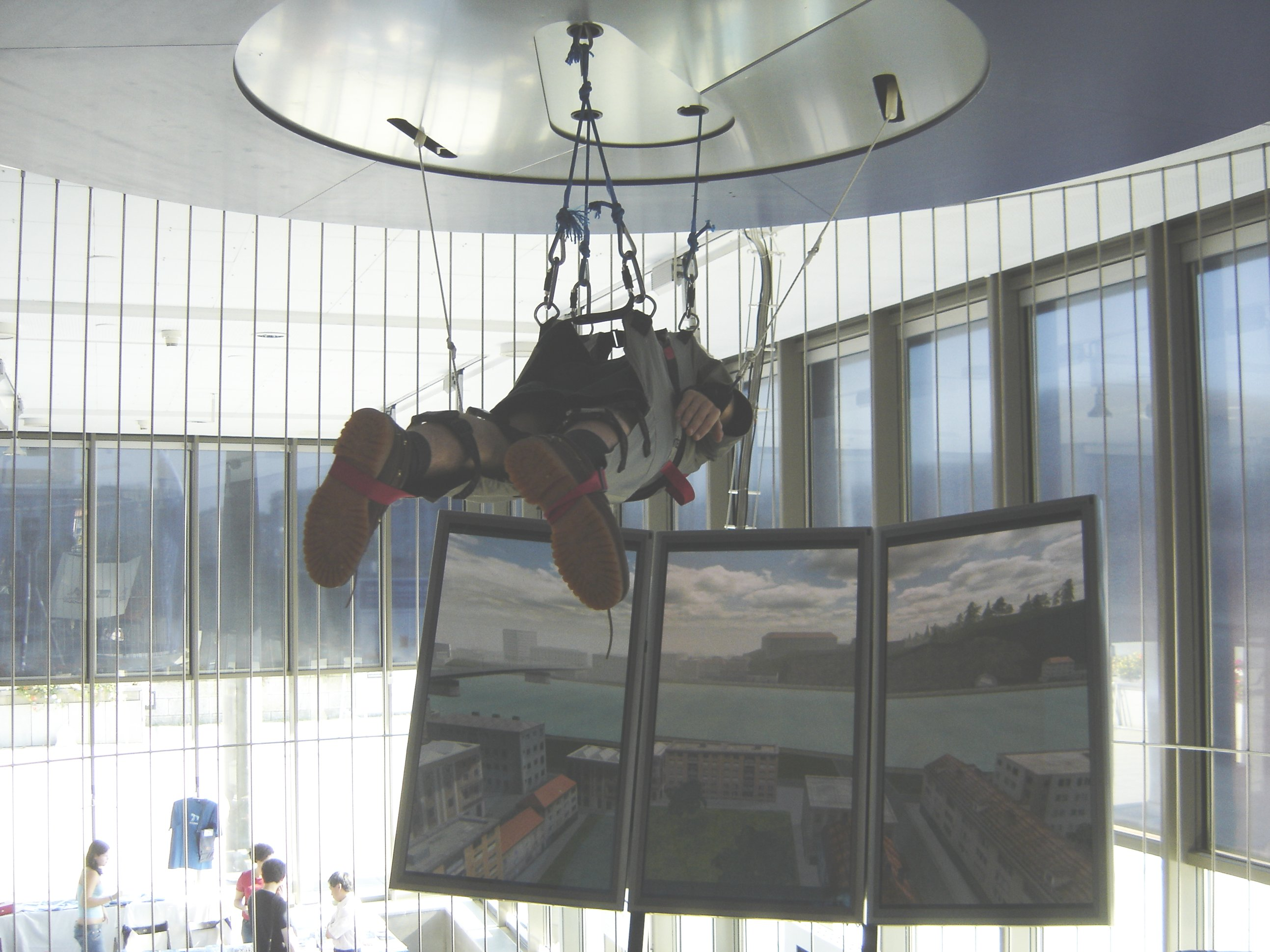
A visitor is suspended from the ceiling to navigate in a virtual reality.

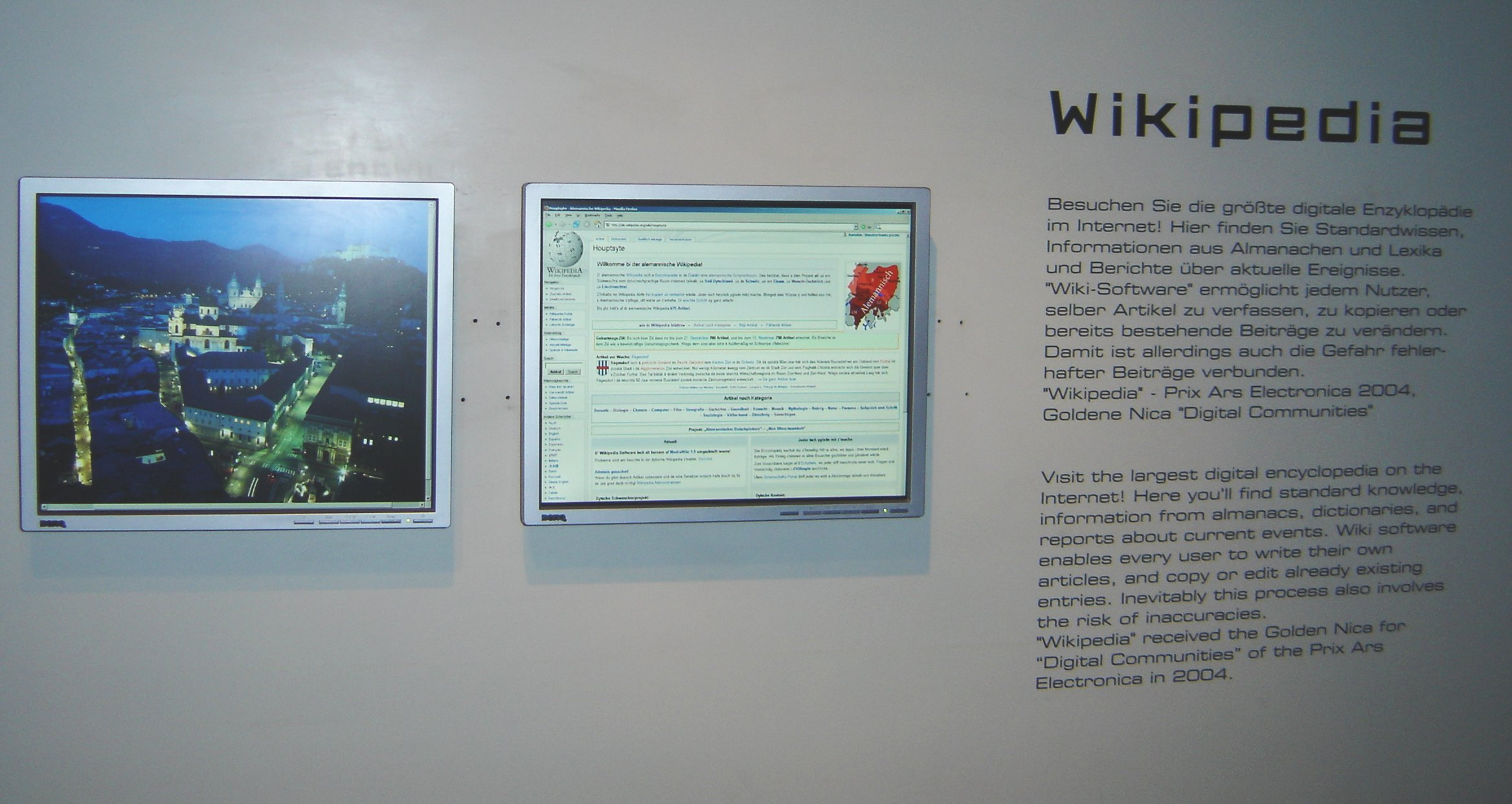
The Wikipedia exhibit shows random articles from Wikipedia in all languages (right screen) and also allows the visitor to navigate Wikipedia interactively (left screen).

== See also ==
- List of electronic music festivals
- Computer art
- Digital art
- Electronic art
- Cyberarts
- CyberArts International
- Ars Technica

== Bibliography ==
- Van Uffelen, Chris. Contemporary Museums – Architecture, History, Collections, Braun Publishing, 2010, ISBN 978-3-03768-067-4, pages 144–145.
