= Videoplace =

In the mid-1970s, Myron Krueger established an artificial reality laboratory called the Videoplace. His idea with the Videoplace was the creation of an artificial reality that surrounded the users, and responded to their movements and actions, without being encumbered by the use of goggles or gloves. The work done in the lab would form the basis of his much cited 1983 book Artificial Reality. The Videoplace (or VIDEOPLACE as Krueger would have it), was the culmination of several iterations of artificial reality systems: GLOWFLOW, METAPLAY, and PSYCHIC SPACE; each offering improvements over the previous installation until VIDEOPLACE was a full blown artificial reality lab at the University of Connecticut.

The Videoplace used projectors, video cameras, special purpose hardware, and onscreen silhouettes of the users to place the users within an interactive environment. Users in separate rooms in the lab were able to interact with one another through this technology. The movements of the users recorded on video were analyzed and transferred to the silhouette representations of the users in the Artificial Reality environment. By the users being able to visually see the results of their actions on screen, through the use of the crude but effective colored silhouettes, the users had a sense of presence while interacting with onscreen objects and other users even though there was no direct tactile feedback available. Because the GUI elements were presented to the user independent of context, they were considered an example of a perpetual user interface. The sense of presence was enough that users pulled away when their silhouettes intersected with those of other users. (Kalawsky 1993; Rheingold 1992). The Videoplace is now on permanent display at the State Museum of Natural History located at the University of Connecticut. (Sturman and Zeltzer 1994).
