= Artificial Reality =

Book series by Mryon W. Krueger

Artificial Reality is a book series by Myron W. Krueger about interactive immersive environments (or virtual realities), based on video recognition techniques, that put a user in full, unencumbered contact with the digital world. He started this work in the late 1960s and is considered to be a key figure in the early innovation of virtual reality. For 16 years Krueger was creating a computer system that connected the actions of a user to the real-time response of visual and auditory displays. Artificial Reality was published in 1983 and updated in Artificial Reality II in 1991 (both published by Addison-Wesley). Artificial Reality II was to explore the concept of 'Videoplace', which is when a users body is implemented into a computer created world full of color, sound, and visuals. Whilst the first iteration of the series Artificial Reality has laid the ground work for different branches of computer-generated worlds like Virtual Reality and Augmented Reality. Visualization is key for all artificial realities to efficiently use data; resulting in being able to utilize human sensory systems that create these artificial realities.
