= CyberArts International =

Series of technology conferences

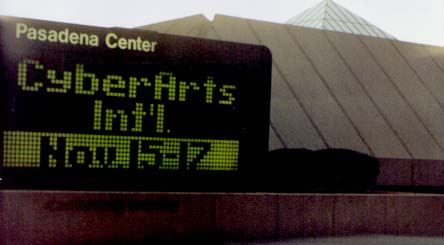
Marquee outside the Pasadena Center during the November 1991 CyberArts International exposition.

CyberArts International was a series of conferences dealing with emerging technologies that took place during years 1990, 1991, and 1992 in Los Angeles and Pasadena, California. The gatherings brought together artists and developers in all types of new media, including software engineers, electronic musicians, and graphic artists to explore what was a new field at the time, digital media collaborations.

A fourth, reunion, exposition was held in San Francisco in September 2001 but saw its attendance undercut by the transportation difficulties which followed the September 11 terrorist attacks.

The conferences dealt with the interrelationship between computer technology, visual design, music and sound, education, and entertainment.

== History ==
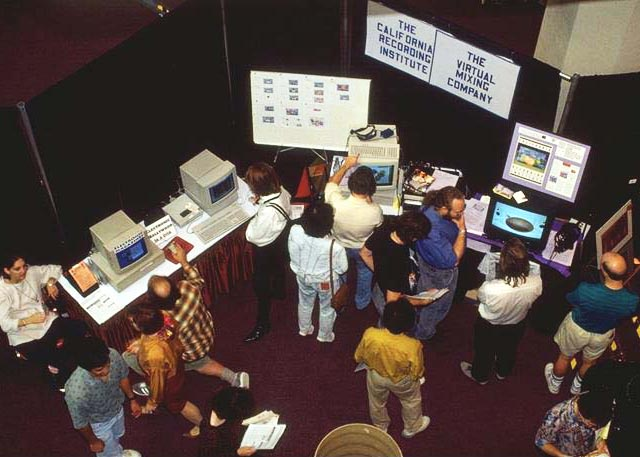
A CyberArts International exposition

=== Background ===
CyberArts International was a series of three annual conferences and exhibitions held in Southern California from 1990 to 1992, focusing upon emerging technologies and techniques for artists working to build interactivity or in the multimedia field. The expositions were originally developed by Dominic Milano, editor of Keyboard Magazine, who served as conference chair, in collaboration with Robert B. Gelman, event producer and Director of Business Development for Miller Freeman Expositions

=== The notion of cyberarts ===
The term cyberarts is a portmanteau combining the root word of cybernetics, dealing with the study of control systems in machines and human nervous systems, and the word for the broad creative fields dealing with the creation of objects of form, beauty, and expression. Inspiration for the CyberArts International conferences revolved around the artistic implications of the rapidly changing technologies related to computers, input devices, digital storage, networking, and reproduction — parallel technologies that were revolutionizing the traditional visual and sonic arts and making possible new forms of artistic expression.

As one enthusiast noted, these new and changing computer tools served to "enhance the creative process by making it easy to experiment with color schemes, sound layers, scene transitions, 3D models, photo retouching, and animated characters."

=== Convention structure ===
The motivating concept behind the CyberArts International conventions was a desire to bring together artists working in the various new media and the firms producing tools for such work, blending artistic exhibition with trade show. During the day the gatherings featured interactive exhibitions and aisles of traditional exhibit booths found at any ordinary trade show. There were in addition numerous interactive art installations, including some that could be ridden like amusement park rides and others which were for their time cutting edge demonstrations of interactive games. Iconic technologies of the future such as CD-ROMs and virtual reality were demonstrated to participants at these tech expositions.

The CyberArts International festivals also featured lectures and workshops dealing with the process of creation of new media art forms, allowing discussion about the rationale and implications of such work. There was also spontaneous collaborative art and performance in real-time.

=== Events ===
Each convention heard keynote speakers who expounded on the relationship of technology to the arts.

Three annual conferences were held from 1990 to 1992. These were covered by local and national media, including the Los Angeles Times, Macworld, PC World, and Amusement Today, which reported on various aspects of the eclectic events. Media accounts likened the concerts associated with the conferences to a "Techno-Woodstock" or a "visionary party."

CyberArts International X, a 10-year reunion commemorating the original CyberArts International events was hosted at The Exploratorium in San Francisco on September 15 and 16, 2001. All of the original participants were invited to return and update one another on the developments of the decade past, and a few new art/technology innovations were to be unveiled. The September 11 terrorist attacks intervened, dramatically impacting the American air transportation system and preventing the participation of some scheduled conference participants.

== Event dates ==
Convention	Location	Date	Notes
CyberArts International 1990	Biltmore Hotel, Los Angeles	September 7-9, 1990	Keynote by Ted Nelson.
CyberArts International 1991	Pasadena Convention Center	November 15-17, 1991	Keynote by Trip Hawkins.
CyberArts International 1992	Pasadena Convention Center	Oct. 29-Nov. 1, 1992	Keynote by Stewart Brand.
CyberArts International X	The Exploratorium, San Francisco	September 15-16, 2001	Keynote by Fiorella Terenzi (via teleconference).

== See also ==
- Boston Cyberarts Festival
- Ars Electronica
