= Boston Cyberarts Festival =

Digital art festival in Boston, Massachusetts, USA

- Location: Boston, Massachusetts, United States
- Founded: 1999
- Awards received: Commonwealth Award (Massachusetts Cultural Council)
- Hosted by: Boston Cyberarts Inc
- Website: http://www.bostoncyberarts.com

The Boston Cyberarts Festival used to be the largest festival of digital art, performance and film created using new technology in the USA. Around 22,000 people attended the festival in 2007, where they witnessed the work of over 200 artists from all over the world.

The festival took place once every two years in Boston, Massachusetts, USA, usually spanning the last week of April and the first week of May. The festival was first held on 1 – 15 May 1999, and the last festival took place on 22 April – 8 May 2011. The Festivals were organized by Boston Cyberarts Inc., a non-profit arts organization.

As of 2013, the director of Cyberarts is George Fifield, who was one of the original cofounders of the organization. Boston Cyberarts, Inc. continues to exist as a non-profit arts organization, but has redirected its energies to promoting the arts and technology year-round, rather than biennially. The most visible continuing effort is the Boston Cyberarts Gallery, which used to be the Axiom Center for New and Experimental Media. The gallery was and is located in the Jamaica Plain neighborhood of Boston, in the Green Street station building on the MBTA Orange Line rapid transit line.

The online presence of the past Boston Cyberarts Festivals, including online exhibits, is archived and still accessible free of charge.

== Location ==
The festival was located in Boston, Massachusetts. The festival typically included a central headquarters where visitors could obtain information about the events and attend the opening night party. Massachusetts had arguably the densest population of digital artists in the US, making Boston the high-technology cultural center of the country. The festival's events were held in Boston's art galleries, museums, universities, and public spaces. For those unable to attend the festival physically, there were virtual festival events held on the internet.

=== First event ===
Around 22,000 people attended the Festival in 2007, where they witnessed the work of over 200 artists from all over the world. Events and exhibitions took place at 81 Festival events organized by over 60 arts organizations in Boston. The events featured:

- Visual art
- Animation
- Video
- Music
- Film
- Dance
- Installations
- Lectures
- Conferences; and
- Discussions

Boston Cyberarts Inc. also presented its exhibitions and performances during the Festival. For example, at the Computer Museum, they presented the exhibition 'Mind into Matter', co-curated by Festival director George Fifield and Francine Koslow Miller. This was the first international survey of digital sculpture. Over 100 events took place, organized by 60 cultural and educational institutions, including museum and gallery exhibitions and visual arts programming.

== Art ==
The artwork at the festival has been produced using computers; often alongside more traditional mediums such as paint, photography, film, musical instruments or dance and performance.

The festival celebrates international art and the wealth of artistic talent in its home region of Massachusetts, United States.

== Awards ==
In 2007, the Boston Cyberarts Festival received the following awards:

- The Commonwealth Award. This is the State's highest honor in the arts, humanities and sciences. This award recognizes an individual or group that has created economic activity, created jobs or generated income through arts and culture. The Awards are given every two years by the Massachusetts Cultural Council (MCC), and are chosen by a committee of cultural and business leaders from a pool of nominations received from across the State.

== See also ==
- CyberArts International
