= Myron W. Krueger =

American computer artist

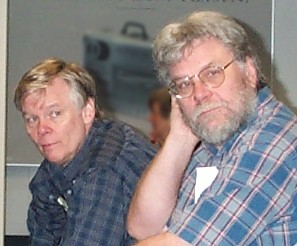
Myron Krueger (left) and Dan Sandin, at Ars Electronica '99

Myron Krueger (born 1942 in Gary, Indiana) is an American computer artist who developed early interactive works. He is also considered to be one of the first generation virtual reality and augmented reality researchers.

While earning a Ph.D. in Computer Science at the University of Wisconsin–Madison, Krueger worked on a number of early interactive computer artworks. In 1969, he collaborated with Dan Sandin, Jerry Erdman and Richard Venezky on a computer-controlled environment called "glowflow," a computer-controlled light sound environment that responded to the people within it. Krueger went on to develop Metaplay, an integration of visuals, sounds, and responsive techniques into a single framework. In this, the computer was used to create a unique real-time relationship between the participants in the gallery and the artist in another building. In 1971, his "Psychic space" used a sensory floor to perceive the participants' movements around the environment. A later project, "Videoplace," was funded by the National Endowment for the arts and a two-way exhibit was shown at the Milwaukee Art Museum in 1975.

From 1974 to 1978 M. Krueger performed computer graphics research at the Space Science and Engineering Center of the University of Wisconsin–Madison in exchange for institutional support for his "Videoplace" work. In 1978, joined the computer science faculty at the University of Connecticut, where he taught courses in hardware, software, computer graphics and artificial intelligence.

"Videoplace" has been exhibited widely in both art and science contexts in the United States and Canada, and it was also shown in Japan. It was included in the SIGGRAPH Art Show in 1985 and 1990. "Videoplace" was also the featured exhibit at SIGCHI (Computer-Human Interaction Conference) in 1985 and 1989, and at the 1990 Ars Electronica Festival. Instead of taking the virtual reality track of head-mounted display and data glove (which would come later in the 1980s), he investigated projections onto walls.

Small Planet, at Mediartech '98, Florence, Italy

Krueger later used the hardware from Videoplace for another piece, Small Planet. In this work, participants are able to fly over a small, computer-generated, 3D planet. Flying is done by holding one's arms out, like a child pretending to fly, and leaning left or right and moving up or down. Small Planet was shown at SIGGRAPH '93, Interaction '97 (Ogaki, Japan), Mediartech '98 (Florence, Italy).

He envisioned the art of interactivity, as opposed to art that happens to be interactive. That is, the idea that exploring the space of interactions between humans and computers was interesting. The focus was on the possibilities of interaction itself, rather than on an art project, which happens to have some response to the user. Though his work was somewhat unheralded in mainstream VR thinking for many years as it moved down a path that culminated in the "goggles 'n gloves" archetype, his legacy has experienced greater interest as more recent technological approaches (such as CAVE and Powerwall implementations) move toward the unencumbered interaction approaches championed by Krueger.

== Bibliography ==
Myron Krueger. Artificial Reality, Addison-Wesley, 1983. ISBN 0-201-04765-9
Myron Krueger. Artificial Reality 2, Addison-Wesley Professional, 1991. ISBN 0-201-52260-8
