= Miller Freeman =

American publisher

- Parent company: United News and Media (1985–2000)
- Status: Operational
- Founded: 1902
- Founder: Miller Freeman
- Successor: VNU (US exhibition); The Channel Company (UK IT division and portion of US IT division); RELX Group (Europe and trade book); Informa (US gaming and most of US IT division; UK, and Asia)
- Country of origin: United States
- Headquarters location: San Francisco
- Publication types: Books, magazines

Miller Freeman, Inc., is a San Francisco–based publisher of trade books and business magazines, as well as a manager of trade and industry expositions. It was an innovative force in business technology and communications in the 1990s until its breakup in 2000. A substantial part of the company was owned by UBM which is now owned by Informa.

== History ==
The company was founded in 1902 by Miller Freeman, a fishing industry magnate, Republican party activist, and the founder and leader of Washington State's Anti-Japanese League. Many of its publications were trade and marketing periodicals distributed free to qualified subscribers in specific industries.

Miller Freeman was acquired by United Newspapers in January 1985, but continued to be run by Marshall Freeman, the founder's grandson, until 2000. In 1991, Miller Freeman Publications merged with Gralla Publications to create Miller Freeman, Inc. Gralla's operations comprised twenty magazines and many trade shows serving markets in the travel, retail, and merchandising arenas. In 1992, Miller Freeman acquired M&T Publishing, Inc. and its four magazines in the software development and networking markets.

During the Internet economic boom of the middle and late 1990s, the company moved aggressively to acquire many technology publications centered on the Internet and telecommunications industries, including the Blenheim Group, producers of the PC EXPO trade show (1996). The company was also notable for publishing Game Developer. In 1999 United News and Media spent $900 million to acquire CMP Media, a leading publisher of high-tech magazines, to complement its Miller Freeman holdings.

Subsequent to the acquisition of CMP Media, Miller Freeman later sold CMP UK and France (including rights to CRN in those countries) to VNU, a media holding company based in the Netherlands (later became part of Incisive Media and currently part of The Channel Company, which itself was founded as part of management buyout of UBM Channel, formerly CMP Channel Group).

Some of Miller Freeman, including the book division, was merged into their CMP equivalents, retaining the CMP rather than the Miller Freeman name. The music book division was renamed Backbeat Books which later sold to Hal Leonard. (music magazine division was renamed Music Player Network which later divested with the rest of CMP Entertainment Media to NewBay Media and today is a part of Future US).

Final logo of Miller Freeman, Inc. used until its dissolution in 2000

In 2000, as part of United News and Media's divestiture of assets, the part of Miller Freeman Inc. which had not been merged into CMP was acquired by VNU for a reported price of $650 million (€695 million). The slightly smaller European portion of Miller Freeman was sold to Reed Elsevier with a few other smaller sales. At the time of divestiture, Miller Freeman assets included 81 magazines, 59 trade shows and related conferences and exhibitions, and various Web sites in five major categories: real estate and construction, sports & apparel, jewelry and gifts, travel and Latin America. Subsequent to divestiture the remaining United News and Media was renamed United Business Media, which retained Miller Freeman's United Kingdom and Asia divisions.

VNU merged much of the purchased Miller Freeman assets into VNU Expositions but VNU subsequently divested themselves of a few former Miller Freeman assets.

Miller Freeman, Inc. trademark was formerly owned by UBM, a subsidiary of Informa, but the trademark was abandoned in 2001.

== Impact ==
Miller Freeman was an innovator in Internet business media and business technology tradeshows. Alan Peterson, former Director of Miller Freeman's electronic EOEM division, is quoted as saying, "The value-driven culture at Miller Freeman had a profound impression on me. The entrepreneurship that took place at headquarters during the Internet boom was nothing less than electrifying. I had what I would call unbridled opportunism there. That means going into markets, not being constrained and jumping on opportunities."

== See also ==
- CyberArts International
