= List of Guggenheim Fellowships awarded in 1999 =

List of Guggenheim Fellowships awarded in 1999.

== U.S. and Canadian Fellows ==
- Chris Aiken, Choreographer and Dancer, Minneapolis; Teaching Specialist in Theatre Arts and Dance, University of Minnesota: Choreography.
- Jonathan Ames, Writer, New York City: Fiction.
- Barbara Watson Andaya, Professor of Asian Studies, University of Hawaii: A gendered history of early modern Southeast Asia.
- C. Edson Armi, Professor of History of Art, University of California, Santa Barbara: The first Romanesque architecture.
- Jon Robin Baitz, Playwright, New York City; Co-Director, Dramatic Writing Program, Juilliard School: Play writing.
- Peter Balakian, Professor of English, Colgate University: A family memoir.
- Lillian Ball, Artist, New York City: Visual art.
- Mary C. Beckerle, Professor of Biology, University of Utah: The molecular mechanism of cell movement.
- Robin Behn, Poet, Tuscaloosa, Alabama; Associate Professor of English, University of Alabama: Poetry.
- Andrea Belag, Artist, New York City; Instructor in Drawing, School of Visual Arts: Painting.
- David Beratan, Professor of Chemistry, University of Pittsburgh: Energy transduction schemes in biology.
- Janet Catherine Berlo, Susan B. Anthony Professor of Gender and Women's Studies and Professor of Art History, University of Rochester: Graphic arts of the 19th-century Plains Indians.
- Derek Bermel, Composer, Brooklyn, New York: Music composition.
- Ben S. Bernanke, Howard Harrison and Gabrielle Snyder Beck Professor of Economics and Public Affairs, Princeton University: Economic policy and the Great Depression.
- David Biale, Koret Professor of Jewish History and Director, Richard S. Dinner Center for Jewish Studies, Graduate Theological Union, Berkeley, California: Blood as a symbol and a substance in Western culture.
- Roger Bilham, Professor of Geological Sciences and Associate Director, Cooperative Institute for Research in the Environmental Sciences(CIRES), University of Colorado, Boulder: Global urbanization and seismic risk.
- Sheila S. Blair, Independent Scholar, Richmond, New Hampshire: A survey of Islamic calligraphy.
- Caroline H. Bledsoe, Professor of Anthropology, Northwestern University: Body contingency and linearity in the history of Western obstetrics.
- Andrea Blum, Artist, New York City; Associate Professor of Art, Hunter College, City University of New York: Sculpture and public art.
- David Bottoms, Poet, Marietta, Georgia; Professor of English, Georgia State University: Poetry.
- Rogers Brubaker, Professor of Sociology, University of California, Los Angeles: Ethnicity and nationalism in a Transylvanian town.
- Stephen G. Brush, Distinguished University Professor of the History of Science, University of Maryland, College Park: A comparative study of theory evaluation in different sciences.
- Steven M. Burke, Composer, Hopewell Junction, New York: Music composition.
- Jacqueline Carey, Writer, Missoula, Montana: Fiction.
- Susan Carey, Professor of Psychology, New York University: The origin of concepts.
- George Chaconas, Professor of Biochemistry and MRC Distinguished Scientist, University of Western Ontario: Molecular biological studies of the Lyme disease spirochete.
- Gordon H. Chang, Associate Professor of History, Stanford University: America's relationship with Asia.
- Jay Clayton, Professor of English and Director of Graduate Studies, Vanderbilt University: Contemporary culture and the 19th-century heritage.
- Daniel A. Cohen, Associate Professor of History, Florida International University: Rebecca Reed and the burning of the Charlestown convent.
- Bernard Cooper, Writer, Los Angeles; Member of the Core Faculty in Fiction and Creative Non-Fiction, Antioch University: A memoir.
- Leda Cosmides, Associate Professor of Psychology, University of California, Santa Barbara: Reason and the evolution of the imagination (in collaboration with John Tooby).
- James Cracraft, Professor of History and University Scholar, University of Illinois at Chicago: The Petrine revolution in Russian culture.
- Blondell Cummings, Choreographer and Performer, New York City: Choreography.
- Andrew Cyrille, Composer, Montclair, New Jersey; Member of the Faculty in Music, New School for Social Research: Music composition.
- Frederick T. Davies, Jr., Professor of Horticulture and of Molecular and Environmental Plant Sciences, Texas A&M University: Mycorrhizal fungi as biofertilizers in Peruvian potato farming systems.
- Dick Davis, Professor of Near Eastern Languages and Cultures, Ohio State University: Translation and literary hybridity.
- Robert C. Davis, Associate Professor of History, The Ohio State University: Italian responses to enslavement by Barbary Coast corsairs, 1500-1800.
- Victoria de Grazia, Professor of History, Columbia University: American market culture in 20th-century Europe.
- Percy Alec Deift, Professor of Mathematics, Courant Institute, New York University: Riemann-Hilbert problems in pure and applied mathematics.
- Paul DeMarinis, Artist, San Francisco; Lecturer in Sound Art, San Francisco Art Institute: Sound installation.
- Junot Díaz, Writer, New York City; Assistant Professor of Creative Writing, Syracuse University: Fiction.
- Patsy S. Dickinson, Professor of Biology, Bowdoin College: Long-term control of neural networks and neuronal properties.
- Tamar Diesendruck, Composer, Somerville, Massachusetts; Fellow, Bunting Institute, Radcliffe College: Music composition.
- Marita Dingus, Artist, Auburn, Washington: Sculpture.
- Emmanuel Dongala, Writer, Great Barrington, Massachusetts; Member of the Faculty in Literature and Chemistry, Simon's Rock College of Bard College: Fiction.
- Christopher B. Donnan, Professor of Anthropology, University of California, Los Angeles: Ceramic portraits of ancient Peru.
- Linda Dowling, Independent Scholar, Princeton, New Jersey: Charles Eliot Norton and the art of civil life.
- Laura Lee Downs, Associate Professor of History, University of Michigan: French children's summer camps, 1880-1960.
- Ellen Carol DuBois, Professor of History, University of California, Los Angeles: Women's enfranchisement worldwide.
- Alessandro Duranti, Professor of Anthropology, University of California, Los Angeles: Walter Capps' campaign for the United States Congress.
- Barry Eichengreen, John L. Simpson Professor of Economics and Professor of Political Science, University of California, Berkeley: The European economy since 1945.
- G. Barney Ellison, Professor of Chemistry and Biochemistry, University of Colorado, Boulder: Atmospheric processing of organic aerosols.
- Nader Engheta, Professor of Electrical Engineering, University of Pennsylvania: Fractional paradigm of classical electrodynamics.
- Will Eno, Playwright, Brooklyn, New York: Play writing.
- Eve Ensler, Playwright, New York City: Play writing.
- Kathleen M. Erndle, Associate Professor of Religion, Florida State University: Women, goddess possession, and power in Kangra Hinduism.
- Jason Eskenazi, Photographer, Bayside, New York: Photography.
- Andrew G. Ewing, Professor of Chemistry, J. Lloyd Huck Professor in Natural Sciences, and Adjunct Professor of Neuroscience and Anatomy, Pennsylvania State University: Single-cell membrane structure following exocytosis.
- Carole Fabricant, Professor of English, University of California, Riverside: Anglo-Irish representations of colonial Ireland.
- B. H. Fairchild, Poet, Claremont, California; Professor of English, California State University, San Bernardino: Poetry.
- Aaron L. Fogelson, Professor of Mathematics, University of Utah: The processes of platelet aggregation and coagulation.
- John Foran, Professor of Sociology, University of California, Santa Barbara: The origins of Third World social revolutions.
- David Frick, Professor of Slavic Languages and Literatures, University of California, Berkeley: Peoples, confessions, and languages in 17th-century Vilnius.
- Peter Fritzsche, Professor of History, University of Illinois at Urbana-Champaign: Nostalgia and memory.
- Kit Galloway, Video Artist, Santa Monica, California; Co-Director, Electronic Cafe International, Santa Monica: Video (in collaboration with Sherrie Rabinowitz).
- Andrew Garrison, Film Maker, Louisville, Kentucky; Visiting Lecturer in Film, University of Texas at Austin: Film making.
- Daniel Gilbert, Professor of Psychology, Harvard University: The psychology of affective forecasting.
- Scott F. Gilbert, Professor of Biology, Swarthmore College: The development and evolution of turtle shells.
- Glenda Elizabeth Gilmore, Associate Professor of History, Yale University: Americans and race from World War I to the Brown decision.
- Warren Ginsberg, Professor of English, University at Albany, State University of New York: Chaucer's Italian tradition.
- Robb W. Glenny, Associate Professor of Medicine and of Physiology and Biophysics, University of Washington School of Medicine: Efficient pulmonary gas exchange.
- Lydia Goehr, Professor of Philosophy, Columbia University: The concept of musicality in modernist opera.
- David Goldes, Photographer, Minneapolis; Professor of Media Arts, Minneapolis College of Art and Design: Photography.
- Cameron Gordon, Sid W. Richardson Foundation Regents Professor of Mathematics, University of Texas at Austin: Studies in three-dimensional manifolds.
- Kenneth R. Graves, Photographer, State College, Pennsylvania; Professor of Art, Pennsylvania State University: Photography.
- James E. Haber, Professor of Biology, Brandeis University: The mechanisms of recombination and DNA repair.
- Matt Harle, Artist, Brooklyn, New York: Sculpture.
- Neil Harris, Preston and Sterling Morton Professor of History, University of Chicago: A history of the American urban newspaper building.
- Jeffrey W. Harrison, Poet, Andover, Massachusetts; Roger Murray Writer-in-Residence, Phillips Academy, Andover: Poetry.
- Regina Harrison, Professor of Comparative Literature and Spanish and Director, Comparative Literature Program, University of Maryland, College Park: Cultural translation in colonial Spanish-Quechua literature.
- Kathryn Hellerstein, Lecturer in Yiddish Language and Literature, University of Pennsylvania: Women poets in Yiddish.
- Paul Hendrickson, Staff Writer, The Washington Post; Visiting Lecturer in English, University of Pennsylvania: The legacy of racism in Mississippi sheriffs' families.
- Michael Herzfeld, Professor of Anthropology, Harvard University: Past and present in modern Rome.
- Julia Heyward, Multi-media Artist, New York City; Visiting Instructor in Video Production, Pratt Institute: Multi-media art.
- Tin-Lun Ho, Professor of Physics, Ohio State University: The new physics of quantum gases of alkali atoms.
- Robert Hooper, Artist, Kildeer, Illinois: Painting.
- Jean E. Howard, Professor of English and Director, Institute for Research on Women and Gender, Columbia University: The social role of the London commercial theater in the early 17th century.
- Terence T. L. Hwa, Associate Professor of Physics, University of California, San Diego: Statistical mechanics of biopolymer association.
- Tina L. Ingraham, Artist, Brunswick, Maine: Painting.
- Mikhail Iossel, Writer, Schenectady, New York; Writer-in-Residence, Union College: Fiction.
- Robert Grant Irving, Independent Scholar, West Hartford, Connecticut; Associate Fellow, Berkeley College, Yale University: A life of Sir Herbert Baker, architect.
- Peter Iverson, Professor of History, Arizona State University: A history of the Navajos.
- David Jablonski, Professor of Geophysical Sciences, University of Chicago: A synthetic study of macroevolution.
- Ron Jenkins, Professor of Performing Arts, Emerson College: The theatrical artistry of Dario Fo.
- Ha Jin, Writer, Lawrenceville, Georgia; Associate Professor of English, Emory University: Fiction.
- Caroline A. Jones, Associate Professor of Art History, Boston University: Clement Greenberg and American art.
- William E. Jones, Film Maker, Los Angeles; Member of the Faculty, California Institute of the Arts: Film making.
- Shirley Kaneda, Artist, New York City: Painting.
- Leo Katz, Professor of Law, University of Pennsylvania Law School: The perverse logic of law and morality.
- Carol Keller, Artist, Boston, Massachusetts; Assistant Professor of Art, Boston University: Visual art.
- Jeffrey Knapp, Associate Professor of English, University of California, Berkeley: Church, nation, and theater in Renaissance England.
- Paul Koonce, Composer, Princeton, New Jersey; Assistant Professor of Music, Princeton University: Music composition.
- Carol Lansing, professor of history, University of California, Santa Barbara: The popolo minuto in medieval Bologna.
- Liz Larner, Artist, Los Angeles; Member of the MFA Faculty, Art Center College of Design, Pasadena: Sculpture.
- James M. Lattimer, professor of physics and astronomy, State University of New York at Stony Brook: The equation of state and neutrino opacities in dense matter.
- Tanya Leullieux (La Tania), Choreographer, Willits, California; artistic director, choreographer, and dancer, La Tania Flamenco Music and Dance: Choreography.
- Yanguang Li, assistant professor of mathematics, University of Missouri; American Mathematical Society Centennial Fellow, Institute for Advanced Study, Princeton: Chaos in partial differential equations.
- Ken Lum, Artist, Vancouver, Canada; professor of fine arts, University of British Columbia: Visual art.
- Joseph H. Lynch, professor of history, Ohio State University: Deathbed conversion to the monastic life, 850-1250.
- Sabine G. MacCormack, Mary Ann and Charles R. Walgreen, Jr., Professor for the Study of Human Understanding, Professor of Classical Studies, and professor of history, University of Michigan: Historical writing in Spain and Peru, 1500-1650.
- Ivan G. Marcus, Frederick P. Rose Professor of Jewish History, professor of history, and of religious studies, Yale University: The relationship of medieval Jews and Christians.
- Ingram Marshall, Composer, Hamden, Connecticut: Music composition.
- Emily Martin, Professor of Anthropology, Princeton University: A cultural analysis of mental terrain in the United States.
- Lisa L. Martin, Professor of Government, Harvard University: Institutional effects on state behavior.
- John Mason, Director, Yoruba Theological Archministry, Brooklyn, New York: Memorial wall-paintings for misspent inner city youth.
- Sara F. Matthews Grieco, Professor of History and Coordinator, Women's and Gender Studies, Syracuse University in Florence, Italy: Printed pictures and the construction of identity in Italy, 1450-1650.
- Peter I. Mészáros, Professor of Astronomy and Astrophysics, Pennsylvania State University: Gamma-ray bursts and their afterglows.
- Linne R. Mooney, Associate Professor of English, University of Maine: Professional scribes in medieval England.
- Ketan Mulmuley, Professor of Computer Science, University of Chicago: Studies in geometric complexity theory.
- Robert S. Nelson, Professor of Art History, University of Chicago: Hagia Sophia as medieval church and modern monument.
- Richard G. Newhauser, Professor of English and Medieval Studies, Trinity University, San Antonio, Texas: The sin of avarice in medieval and Renaissance thought.
- William Royall Newman, Professor of History and Philosophy of Science, Indiana University: Daniel Sennert and early modern matter-theory.
- Josip Novakovich, Writer, Cincinnati, Ohio; Associate Professor of English and Comparative Literature, University of Cincinnati: Fiction.
- Stephen Nowicki, Anne T. and Robert M. Bass Associate Professor of Zoology, Duke University: Nutrition and song-learning in birds.
- Geoffrey O'Brien, Writer, New York City; Editor-in-Chief, Library of America, New York City: Popular music in 20th-century American life.
- Alex O'Neal, Artist, Brooklyn, New York: Painting.
- Steve Orlen, Poet, Tucson, Arizona; Professor of English, University of Arizona; Member of the Faculty, Warren Wilson College MFA Program for Writers: Poetry.
- Katharine Park, Samuel Zemurray, Jr. and Doris Zemurray Stone-Radcliffe Professor of the History of Science and Women's Studies, Harvard University: The early history of human dissection.
- Robert ParkeHarrison, Photographer, Worcester, Massachusetts; Assistant Professor of Art, College of the Holy Cross: Photography.
- Pat Passlof, Artist, New York City; Professor of Art, College of Staten Island, City University of New York: Painting.
- Leighton Pierce, Film Maker, Iowa City; Professor of Film and Video Production, University of Iowa: Film making.
- Claudia Roth Pierpont, Writer, New York City; Contributor, The New Yorker: A biography of Lincoln Kirstein.
- David J. Pine, Professor of Chemical Engineering and Professor of Materials, University of California, Santa Barbara: The dynamics of mesoscopic glassy materials.
- Russell Pinkston, Composer, Austin, Texas; Associate Professor of Composition and Director, Electronic Music Studios, University of Texas at Austin: Music composition.
- Melissa Ann Pinney, Photographer, Evanston, Illinois; Adjunct Instructor in Photography, Columbia College Chicago: Photography.
- Robert A. Pollak, Hernreich Distinguished Professor of Economics, College of Arts and Sciences and the John M. Olin School of Business, Washington University in St. Louis: Family bargaining.
- Sherrie Rabinowitz, Video Artist, Santa Monica, California; Co-Director, Electronic Cafe International, Santa Monica: Video (in collaboration with Kit Galloway).
- Peter Railton, Professor of Philosophy, University of Michigan: Objectivity and value.
- Archie Rand, Artist, Brooklyn, New York; Professor of Visual Arts and Director of Painting and Drawing, Columbia University: Painting.
- Susan Rethorst, Choreographer, Amsterdam, the Netherlands; Instructor in Choreography, Amsterdam School of the Arts: Choreography.
- Michael Riordan, Assistant to the director, Stanford Linear Accelerator Center, California; Adjunct Professor of Physics, University of California, Santa Cruz: The rise and fall of the Superconducting Super Collider.
- Tyson R. Roberts, Research Associate, Smithsonian Tropical Research Institute(STRI), Panama, and Biodiversity Research and Training Program(BRTP), National Center for Genetic Engineering and Biotechnology, Bangkok, Thailand: Freshwater fishes of tropical Asia.
- Hanneline Røgeberg, Artist, Hoboken, New Jersey; Assistant Professor of Painting, Mason Gross School of the Arts, Rutgers University: Painting.
- Peter A. Rogerson, Professor of Geography, University at Buffalo, State University of New York: Statistical methods for the surveillance of geographic patterns.
- Kurt Rohde, Composer, San Francisco; Artistic Director, Chamber Music Partnership, San Francisco: Music composition.
- Pam Ronald, Associate Professor of Plant Pathology, University of California, Davis: Bacterial factors affecting plant host signal transduction.
- Kristin Ross, Professor of Comparative Literature, New York University: French cultural memory and the May 1968 upheavals.
- Ira Sadoff, Poet, Hallowell, Maine; Dana Professor of Poetry, Colby College: Poetry.
- Roberto H. Schonmann, Professor of Mathematics, University of California, Los Angeles: Percolation and related processes on graphs.
- Seth Schwartz, Associate Professor of History, Jewish Theological Seminary: Imperialism and Jewish society, 200 BCE - 634 CE.
- Carol Shields, Writer, Winnipeg, Canada; Chancellor, University of Winnipeg; Professor of English, University of Manitoba: Fiction.
- Uri Shulevitz, Artist and Writer, New York City: Sephardic folktales for young readers.
- Montgomery Slatkin, Professor of Integrative Biology, University of California, Berkeley: Population genetics of human genetic diseases.
- Steven B. Smith, Photographer, Providence, Rhode Island; Adjunct Professor of Photography, Rhode Island School of Design: Photography.
- C. Christopher Soufas, Jr., Professor of Spanish, Tulane University: Spanish literature in modernist Europe.
- Joel Spruck, Professor of Mathematics, Johns Hopkins University: Nonlinear problems in geometry.
- Richard Stamelman, Professor of Romance Languages and Literatures, Williams College: The literature and culture of perfume.
- Duncan G. Steel, Professor of Electrical Engineering and Computer Science, and professor of physics, University of Michigan: Semiconductor nanostructures for quantum information.
- Christopher Sullivan, Film Animator, Chicago; Associate Professor of Film Making, School of the Art Institute of Chicago: Film animation.
- Katherine H. Tachau, Professor of History, University of Iowa: The creation of the Bibles moralisées in 13th-century Paris.
- Éva Tardos, Professor of Computer Science, Cornell University: Approximation-algorithms for network problems.
- Maria Tatar, Professor of German, Harvard University: "Bluebeard" in folklore, fiction, and film noir.
- Roger Tibbetts, Artist, Dayville, Connecticut; Associate Professor of Painting, Massachusetts College of Art: Painting and sculpture.
- John Tooby, Professor of Anthropology, University of California, Santa Barbara: Reason and the evolution of the imagination (in collaboration with Leda Cosmides).
- Alan M. Wald, Professor of English and American Culture, University of Michigan: The American literary left in the mid-20th century.
- Mack Walker, Professor of History, Johns Hopkins University: The Halle enlightenment, 1685-1725.
- Alice Wexler, Research Scholar, Center for the Study of Women, University of California, Los Angeles: Chorea and community in East Hampton, New York.
- Susan Wheeler, Poet, New York City; Member of the MFA Faculty in Creative Writing, New School for Social Research: Poetry.
- Brian White, Professor of Mathematics, Stanford University: Minimal surfaces and mean-curvature flow.
- Bruce Winstein, Samuel K. Allison Distinguished Service Professor of Physics, University of Chicago: Polarization measurement of cosmic microwave background radiation.
- Brian Wood, Photographer and Artist, New York City; Lecturer in Photography, Yale University: Photography and graphic art.
- Martha Woodmansee, Professor of English, Case Western Reserve University: Germany's contribution to the Western concept of intellectual property.
- Randall Woolf, Composer, Brooklyn, New York: Music composition.
- James D. Wuest, Professor of Chemistry, University of Montreal: Molecular tectonics.
- Wu Hung, Harrie A. Vanderstappen Distinguished Service Professor of Art History, University of Chicago: Ruins in Chinese visual culture.
- Andrei Y. Yakovlev, Professor and Director of Biostatistics, Huntsman Cancer Institute, University of Utah: Oligodendrocyte development in cell culture.
- Reginald Yates, Choreographer, Tampa, Florida; Artist-in-Residence, Juilliard School: Choreography.
- Eric Zencey, Writer, East Calais, Vermont: The Wollemi pines.
- Xin Zhou, Associate Professor of Mathematics, Duke University: Oscillatory Riemann-Hilbert problems.

== Latin American and Caribbean Fellows ==
- Carlos Aguirre, Assistant Professor of Latin American History, University of Oregon: A social, political, and cultural history of imprisonment in modern Peru.
- Alfredo Benavidez Bedoya, Artist, Buenos Aires, Argentina; Rector, High School of Fine Arts 'Ernesto de la Cárcova', Buenos Aires: Graphic art.
- Esteban Buch, Writer and Musicologist, Paris, France: Opera, zoophilia, and dictatorship.
- Gloria Camiruaga, Video Artist, Santiago, Chile: Film making.
- Marisa Carrasco, Associate Professor of Psychology and Neural Sciences, New York University: Effects of spatial attention on visual perception.
- María C. Chavarría, Assistant Professor of Spanish, Indiana University-Purdue University Indianapolis: Ethnolinguistic dictionary of Ese eja and Spanish.
- Gabri Christa, Choreographer, Staten Island, New York and Curaçao; Artistic Director, CREATE!, Il Piccolo Teatro, Brooklyn, New York: Choreography.
- Hildegardo Córdova Aguilar, Professor of Geography and Executive Director, Research Center for Applied Geography (CIGA), Pontifical Catholic University of Peru, Lima: The environmental sustainability of medium-sized cities in Peru.
- René Davids, Associate Professor of Architecture, University of California, Berkeley: The hillside elevator as a generator of social and urban form in Valparaíso.
- Roberto Escudero, Professor of Physics, Institute of Materials Research, National Autonomous University of Mexico (UNAM): Electron tunneling in magnetic systems.
- Jorge Febles Dueñas, Research Professor, Center for Anthropology, Havana, Cuba: The application of new information and communication technologies to archaeology.
- Pablo A. Ferrari, Professor of Mathematics, University of São Paulo, Brazil: Space-time behavior, quasi-stationarity, and random environment for interacting particle systems.
- Paz Alicia Garciadiego, Screenwriter, Mexico City: Screen writing.
- Roberto Gargarella, Professor of Constitutional Law and Legal Philosophy, Universidad Torcuato di Tella, Buenos Aires, Argentina: The philosophical bases of South American constitutionalism, 1810-1860.
- Jorge Daniel Gelman, Professor of History, University of Buenos Aires, Argentina: The state and the agrarian question in Buenos Aires in the first half of the 19th century.
- Guillermo Giucci, Adjunct Professor of Brazilian Literature, State University of Rio de Janeiro, Brazil: A cultural biography of Gilberto Freyre.
- Flavio Grynszpan, Assistant Professor, The Scripps Research Institute, La Jolla, California: Towards the design and synthesis of artificial enzymes.
- Nibaldo C. Inestrosa, Professor of Molecular Neurobiology, Catholic University of Chile, Santiago: A study of the interaction of cholinesterases with the amyloid-β peptide.
- Leopoldo Infante, Associate Professor of Astrophysics, Catholic University of Chile, Santiago: Formation and evolution of structure in the universe.
- Noemi Lapzeson, Choreographer, Teacher, and Artistic Director, Vertical Danse-Company Noemi Lapzeson, Geneva, Switzerland: Choreography.
- Pedro Lemebel, Writer, Santiago, Chile; Radio Commentator, Radio Tierra Purísima, Santiago: Chronicles of a sinner.
- Enrique P. Lessa, Professor of Evolution, University of the Republic, Montevideo, Uruguay: Geographic genetic structure in the Rio Negro tuco-tuco.
- João Gilberto Noll, Writer, Porto Alegre, Brazil; Columnist, Folha de S.Paulo: Fiction.
- Osvaldo L. Podhajcer, Professor of Biochemistry and Molecular Biology, University of Buenos Aires, Argentina; Head, Gene Therapy Laboratory, Fundacion Campomar, Buenos Aires: Molecular mechanisms associated with human melanoma progression.
- Rosângela Rennó, Artist, Rio de Janeiro, Brazil: Multimedia and installation art.
- Mario Sagradini, Artist, Montevideo, Uruguay: Installation art.
- Arthur Simms, Artist, Long Island City, New York; Preparator, Museum of Modern Art, New York City: Sculpture.
- Heinz R. Sonntag, Professor of Sociology and Senior Researcher, Center for Development Studies, Central University of Venezuela, Caracas: Exclusion, poverty, integration, and cohesion in comparative perspective.
- Javier Téllez, Artist, Long Island City, New York: Installation art.
- Teresa Toledo Cabrera, Independent Researcher and Specialist in Latin American Film Documentation, Madrid, Spain: A dictionary of Latin American film directors.
- Henrique E. Toma, Professor of Chemistry, Institute of Chemistry, University of São Paulo, Brazil: Supramolecular complexes and devices.
- Sergio Vega, Artist, New York City: Installation art.
- Julia Vicioso, Architect, Rome, Italy: The role of the Columbus family palace in the development of colonial Latin American architecture.
- Mariana Villanueva, Composer, Morelos, Mexico: Music composition.

== See also ==
- Guggenheim Fellowship
