= Technoromanticism (book) =

1999 book by Richard Coyne

Technoromanticism: Digital Narrative, Holism, and the Romance of the Real
- Author: Richard Coyne
- Language: English
- Genre: Philosophy
- Publisher: MIT Press
- Publication date: 1999
- Publication place: United States

Technoromanticism: Digital Narrative, Holism, and the Romance of the Real is a philosophical book written by Richard Coyne, published in 1999.

In Technoromanticism, Coyne shows how narratives about the computer, and high technology in general, are grounded in Enlightenment and romantic traditions. Because of these narratives grounding, discourse about technology is subject to very similar critiques of the Enlightenment and romanticism.

== Plan ==
The plan of the book is divided into three parts: unity, multiplicity, and ineffability. In the introduction, the reader is given a summary glimpse of technoromanticism as an attempt to establish political unity through information, as an attempt to achieve techno-idealism through empirical realism, and as an attempt to achieve a digital utopia. Throughout the work he points out the shortcomings of such endeavors.

== Unity ==
In the first part of the book, Coyne shows how IT narratives attempt to transcend the material realm. He discusses how romanticism in a neoplatonic guise provides the allure and seduction of cyberspace and technologies devoted to creating it. (p. 63)

== Multiplicity ==
In the second part of the book, Coyne discusses how the philosophy of empiricism is foundational to the modeling of space and time for computers.

== Ineffability ==
What a computer represents is done through coding and code consists of a symbolic language that can be used to model the world around us. However, for Lacan, what is real is what cannot be symbolized or represented. Thus, for Coyne, the computer strongly suggests the idea that there is a fundamental disconnection from reality through the lens of high technology.

== Bibliography ==
- Richard Coyne, Technoromanticism, (Cambridge, Massachusetts: The MIT Press, 1999).
