= Andrew Ewing =

Andrew Ewing may refer to:

- Andrew Ewing (politician) (1813–1864), American politician, member of the U.S. House of Representatives for Tennessee
- Andrew G. Ewing (born 1957), American chemist
- A. J. Ewing (Andrew Joseph Ewing, born 2004), American baseball outfielder

== See also ==
- Andrew Orr-Ewing (born 1965), British chemist
