= Sherrie Rabinowitz =

- Born: January 6, 1950
- Died: April 8, 2013 (aged 63)
- Known for: Video Art
- Partner: Kit Galloway

Sherrie Rabinowitz (1950–2013) was an American video artist and a pioneer in satellite-based telecommunications art. She worked exclusively with Kit Galloway under the moniker Mobile Image from 1977 onwards. She co-founded the Electronic Café International (ECI), a performance space and real café housed in the 18th Street Arts Center in Santa Monica, California, with Galloway. She died in 2013, from complications due to multiple sclerosis.

== Career ==
=== Optic Nerve ===
She studied at University of California Berkeley and was involved in the collective Optic Nerve, which created underground video and guerrilla television. Optic Nerve was one of the few San Francisco video collectives with women members in the 1970s. As part of Optic Nerve she collaborated with the architecture and performance collective Ant Farm which was also based out of San Francisco. These projects include: Media Burn (1975), The Eternal Frame (1975), and Pier 40 Fire Clean Up (1978).

=== Mobile Image ===
From the mid-1970s onwards, Kit Galloway and Sherrie Rabinowitz created numerous art works which could be categorized as communication aesthetics, telecollaborative art, telematic art, cyber art, and digital theatre. One example of their work is the 1977 Satellite Arts Project: A Space with No Boundaries, which created composite images of two dancers in California and two dancers in Maryland, and was supported by NASA. Another example is their 1980 satellite relay project Hole-in-Space which connected public spaces in New York and Los Angeles with live audio and life-sized video. Rabinowitz coined the phrase "We must create at the same scale that we can destroy" which would become the headline of Mobile Image's manifesto for their Electronic Cafe Network Project (1984) commissioned for the 1984 Los Angeles Summer Olympics Art Festival.
