= Asian Americans (film series) =

2020 PBS documentary series

Asian Americans is a five-hour PBS documentary film series made by ITVS, WETA, and the Center for Asian American Media. The series focus on the history of Asian and Asian American people in the United States and first aired on May 11, 2020. It received a Peabody Award in 2021.

== Crew ==
The series lead producer was Renee Tajima-Peña who described the series as being about "not about how Asians became American, but how Asians have helped shape America." The series' music was composed by Vivek Maddala. Narration throughout the series was done by Asian American actors Daniel Dae Kim and Tamlyn Tomita.

== Summary ==
No.	Title	Original release date	Running time
1	"Breaking Ground"	May 11, 2020	54 minutes 11 seconds (PBS)
In an era of exclusion and U.S. empire, new immigrants arrive from China, India, Japan, the Philippines and beyond. Barred by anti-Asian laws they become America's first "undocumented immigrants," yet they build railroads, dazzle on the silver screen, and take their fight for equality to the U.S. Supreme Court.
2	"A Question of Loyalty"	May 12, 2020	54 minutes 1 second (PBS)
An American-born generation straddles their country of birth and their parents' homelands.
3	"Good Americans"	May 12, 2020	54 minutes 11 seconds (PBS)
During the Cold War years, Asian Americans are simultaneously heralded as a Model Minority and targeted as the perpetual foreigner. It is also a time of bold ambition, as Asian Americans aspire for the first time to national political office and a coming culture-quake simmers beneath the surface.
4	"Generation Rising"	May 12, 2020	54 minutes 11 seconds (PBS)
During a time of war and social tumult, a young generation fights for equality in the fields, on campuses and in the culture, and claim a new identity: Asian Americans. The war's aftermath brings new immigrants and refugees who expand the population and the definition of Asian America.
5	"Breaking Through"	May 12, 2020	53 minutes 11 seconds (PBS)
At the turn of the new millennium, the national conversation turns to immigration, race, and economic disparity. As the U.S becomes more diverse, yet more divided, a new generation of Asian Americans tackle the question, how do we as a nation move forward together?

== Content ==
=== Episode 1: Breaking Ground ===
First aired on May 11, 2020, Episode One focused on the early immigration of Asian people from China, India, Japan, and the Philippines starting in the 19th and 20th century.

The episode opens with the story of an Igorot boy named Antero who served as an interpreter and house boy for anthropologist Albert Jencks. In 1904, Antero accompanied Jencks to the world fair in St. Louis to be a part of the Philippine exhibit. The United States, through its imperialism, had annexed part the Philippines and highlighted this by having a Philippine exhibit at the 1904 fair. Fair managers instructed the various Igorot people to perform dances and dog-eating for the crowds, even though the consumption of dog was not common and was for ceremonial purposes. The exhibit was used to enforce the ideas of a racial hierarchy and portrayed the Igorot people as savages. A descendant of Antero, Mia Abeya, speaks of her grandfather and his goal of earning enough money and status to live the American dream.

Golden Spike photo

The episode then describes how Asian immigrants were drawn to California by the 1848 Gold Rush but wound up working on the transcontinental railroad. Chinese workers were seen as a reliable and cheap source of labor and became essential as they made up nearly 90% of the western railroad company's construction crew. Chinese Associations would recover Chinese railway workers' remains from avalanches or other construction accidents to be repatriated back to China. Historian Gordon H. Chang stated that nearly 12,000 people's remains could be sent back to China at one time. When the transcontinental railroad was completed on May 10, 1869, the photo taken to commemorate the accomplishment omits any trace of Chinese workers.

The number of Chinese laborers in 1870 was crucial for the development of California but led to an increasing belief that they were a threat to White American laborers. The anti-Chinese sentiment included attacks on Chinatowns, burnings of businesses, and lynchings. The anti-Chinese sentiment was codified into law when the United States congress passed the Chinese Exclusion Act in 1882, which was the first time a group of people were banned from entering the United States solely on the basis of race and nationality.

The Chinese Exclusion Act, the documentary states, set the stage for the use and enforcement of immigration documents and the laws used to arrest and deport people found in the country unlawfully. Historian Erika Lee said the Chinese were, in essence, "the first illegal immigrants, the first undocumented immigrants."

Several court cases that impacted Asian and Asian Americans status in the United States are detailed in the episode. Chinese couple Joseph Tape and Mary Tape sued on behalf of their daughter, Mamie Tape, to go to a white school in the court case Tape v. Hurley. Alisa Kim, a descendant of the Tapes, speaks on her ancestors pasts in the episode. Yick Wo v Hopkins set the precedent of equal protection under the law regardless of race. In the Supreme Court case United States v. Wong Kim Ark, Wong Kim Ark won the right of citizenship for anyone born in the United States.

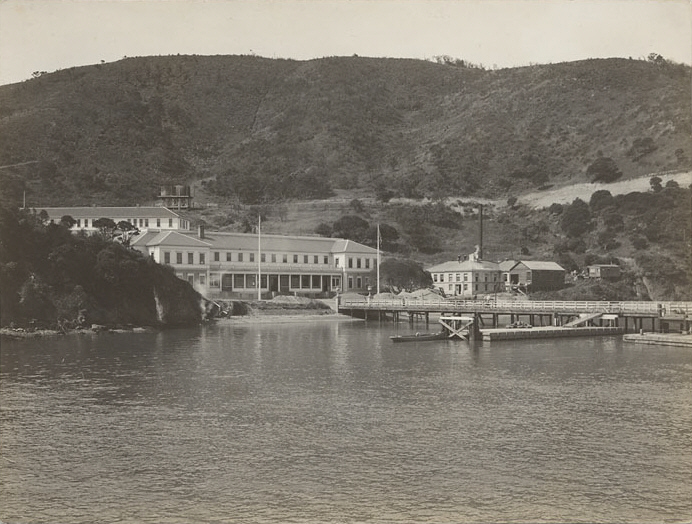
Angel Island Immigration Station

While there were legal victories, the documentary describes how Asians continued to face discrimination and hardship. Angel Island Immigration Station near San Francisco was used to detain predominantly Asian immigrants. Connie Young Yu describes her grandmother's experiences in Angel Island, which was complicated due to her grandfather's death. The documentary also mentions how in the early 20th century only white people and Black people could apply for naturalized citizenship and so Asian immigrants had to appeal for citizenship through these mechanism. Most noteworthy of this incident mentioned was the court case United States v. Bhagat Singh Thind, where Thind attempted to argue he was in fact Aryan and thus could apply for naturalization. The consequences of United States v. Bhagat Singh Thind being ruled against Thind meant that all Indians in the United States could have their land and businesses taken away or be denaturalized.

Writer Vivek Bald appeared in the episode to talk about Moksad Ali, an Indian peddler salesman, and his African-American wife, Ella Ali's experiences as an interracial couple. Moksad Ali's descendants also are shown in the episode and speak on his experience as peddler salesman and one of the earliest peddlers to settle in New Orleans. The documentary details how Indian people, such as Moksad Ali, often settled near or in African-American communities due to the fact they were still seen as dark-skinned people in a highly segregated South. However, Moksad and Ella Ali are buried in an all-white cemetery, an example of how Asian identity complicated the understanding of race.

Episode One also touches on how the second-generation of Asian Americans worked toward assimilation and acceptance. The experiences of Anna May Wong and Sessue Hayakawa are described in the documentary as examples of Asian individuals finding great success in the United States yet still hitting the bamboo ceiling, due to the fact they were often hired to only portray villains or other negative stereotypes. The documentary describes how The Good Earth epitomized Hollywood racism and showcased how white actors in yellowface were rewarded and prioritized rather than casting Asian actors as the protagonists.

Episode One concludes with a summary of how Asian and Asian Americans have challenged the idea of citizenship, social belonging, and what it means to be American.

People featured in Episode One are: Candy Gourlay, Nayan Shah, Connie Young Yu, Gordan Chang, Mae Ngai, Erika Lee, Vivek Bald (writer), Sharmila Sen (writer), Shirley Lim (historian), Nancy Wang Yuen, and Elaine Cho

=== Episode 2: A Question of Loyalty ===
First aired on May 12, 2020. Episode Two mainly focuses on the experiences of the Uno and Ina families in the era of Japanese internment camps in the United States.

Episode 2 begins with film director Satsuki Ina describing finding her mother's identification number given to her in the Japanese internment camps and the narrator asking the audience "What does it mean to be a loyal American?" Roberta Uno, a descendant of George Uno - a Japanese immigrant - speaks on how her grandfather immigrated but was unable to own land or become a citizen. Uno speaks of her own family's experience with racism and how anti-Asian sentiments continued, including from other immigrants. The discrimination manifested in segregated neighborhoods, exclusion from organizations such as the Boy Scouts of America, and fewer work opportunities. Roberta Uno's uncle Buddy Uno is one such example where he could only find work as a mainstream reporter in Japan. Buddy Uno, who was also a Japanese Military correspondent, wrote positively of the Japanese military in the Sino-Japanese War. Buddy Uno would later become a propagandist for the Japanese during the war.

Historian Brian Niiya speaks in the episode on the differences between the Japanese Issei and Nisei generations. Niiya describes how Nisei generations "because they had been treated so badly in the United States and I think there was a greater openness to overlook some of the atrocities that the Japanese were committing."

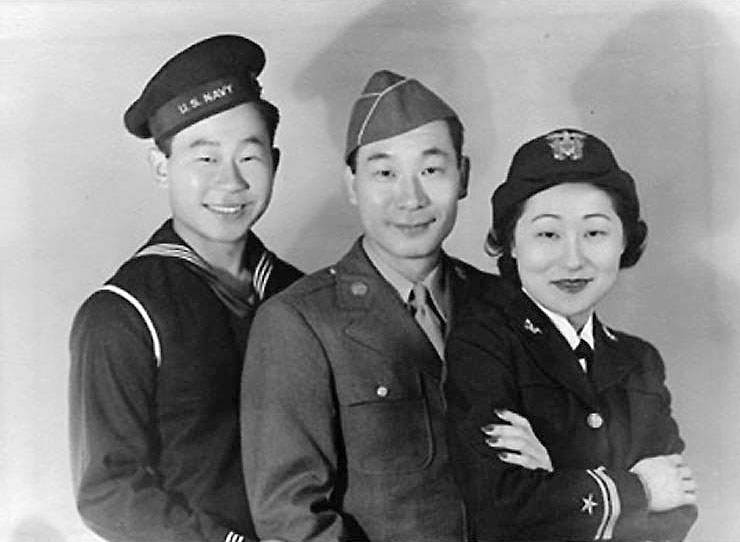
Ahn siblings in uniform (from left to right, Ralph, Philip, and Susan Ahn)

While Buddy Uno was successful overseas, his connection to the Japanese military made his father - George Uno - a target of the Federal Bureau of Investigation to detain and investigate after the Attack on Pearl Harbor in 1941. George Uno was detained in Griffith park. The United States imposed a curfew on all Japanese People and regulated how far they could travel. The episode talks about how Earl Warren became a driving force behind the internment of over one hundred thousand Japanese Americans without any charges or due process.

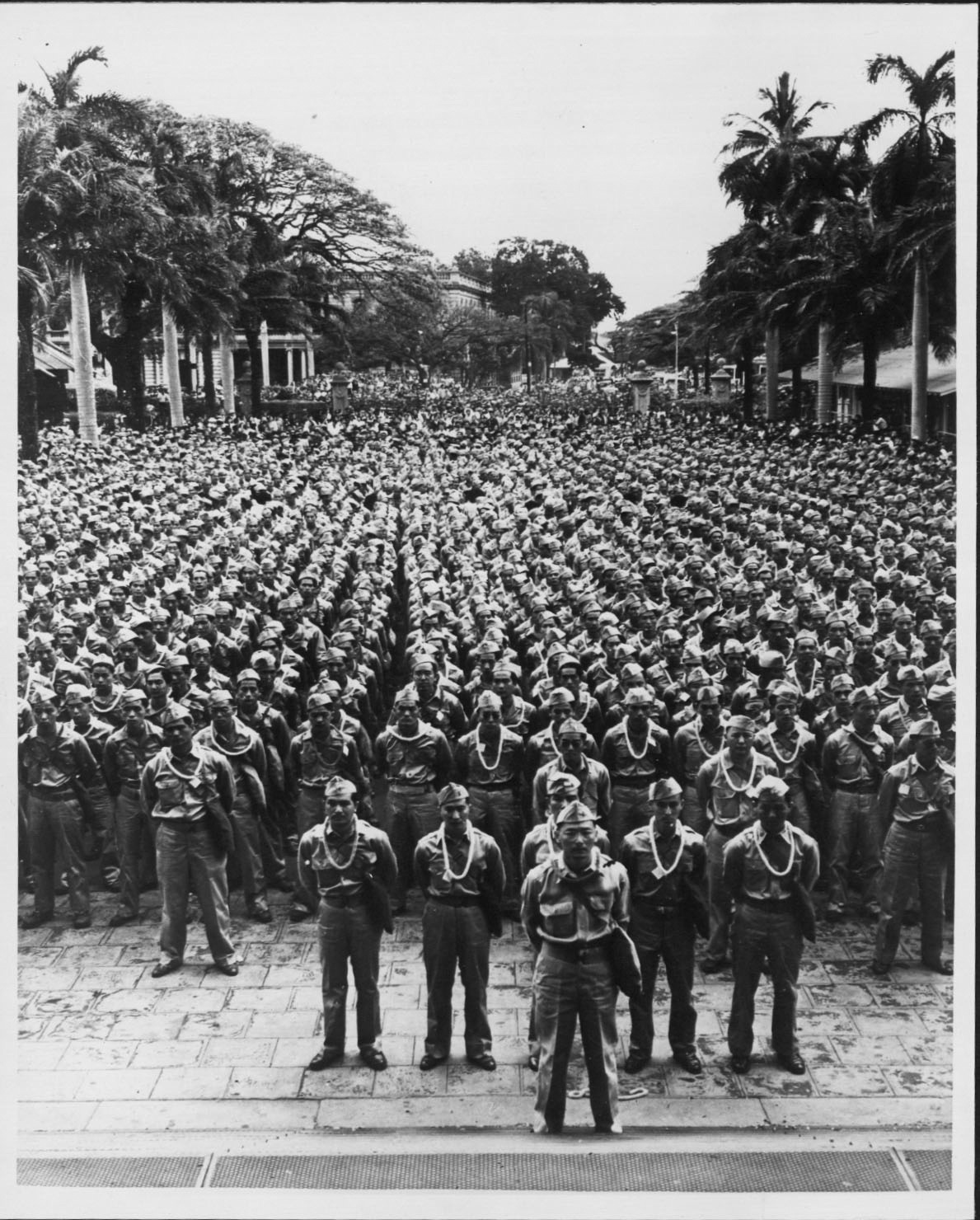
The Japanese-American 442nd Regimental Combat Team (1943)

In an effort to avoid the anti-Japanese hate and discrimination, Chinese and Korean Americans wore buttons or other identifiers to communicate to the public they were not Japanese. The episode also describes how some Chinese and Korean Americans fully supported America's war effort since it would mean Japanese Imperialism in China, Korea, and the Philippines may be put to an end. Susan Ahn Cuddy, the first-Asian woman to enlist in the U.S. Navy and its first female gunnery officer, joined the navy as a way to honor her Korean activist father, Ahn Chang Ho "Dosan" and the country of Korea. Philip Ahn, Susan's brother, also honors Korea and his parents by taking pride in playing villainous Japanese roles in Hollywood films as a way to create more anti-Japanese sentiment.

On February 19, 1942, President Roosevelt signed Executive Order 9066 which authorized the incarceration of around 110,000 Japanese people, two-thirds of them were born in the United States and were citizens. Dr. Ina described how the imprisonment by The United States government was racially motivated due to the fact they imprisoned anyone who they deemed as having 1/16th Japanese blood. Historian Jane Hong describes the different types of internment camps and how family separation was not uncommon. Imprisoned Japanese had to answer a loyalty questionnaire.

The episode describes how Japanese enlisted in the U.S. military from the internment camps. Three of the Uno brothers joined the U.S. military. Howard and Stanley Uno joined as intelligence officers while Ernest Uno was in the 442nd Infantry Regiment. The three Uno brothers vowed to kill their brother Buddy Uno because he was considered a traitor. In 1944, Buddy Uno was stationed in a Japanese prisoner of war camp and met with photojournalist Carl Mydans. Mydans would later describe him as a tortured soul. Buddy Uno never returned to the U.S. and died of Tuberculosis. His descendants speak of him as someone who did his best to survive.

George Uno and his youngest son, Edison Uno, were released from the internment camps in 1947. Edison went on to be an activist for previously incarcerated Japanese and his work, along with others such as Yuji Ichioka, would culminate in the Civil Liberties Act of 1988 signed by President Reagan.

The episode concludes with a call to action to prevent the practice of family separation and internment of people from ever happening again.

People featured in Episode Two are: Satsuki ina (American film director), Roberta Uno (descendant of George Uno), Brian Niiya (historian), Amy Uno, Jane Hong (historian), Christine Cuddy (daughter of Susan Ahn Cuddy), and Emiko Uno (daughter of Buddy Uno).

=== Episode 3: Good Americans ===
Episode 3 aired on May 12, 2020. Episode Three focuses on the continued discrimination against Asians and Asian Americans, the struggle of assimilation, and the rise of Asian Americans in politics all in the context of the Cold War.

The episode begins with reminding the audience that many Asian Americans fought for freedom in WWII and expected equality at home. The G.I. bill offered an opportunity for Asian American veterans to gain access to new educational opportunities. Historian Alex Fabros, Jr. speaks about his Filipino father's hopes of rising to the middle class and how some Asian veterans were even able to become American citizens because they served in the war. Erika Lee describes how the economic success of Japanese and Chinese after the war buttressed the idea of the model minority. One such example of Asians being heralded as the model minority is Toy Len Goon, who won the title of American Mother of the Year in 1952. However, the episode makes it known that being seen as the model minority did not free Asian Americans from discrimination or racial politics of the U.S. Helen Zia speaks about how her parents were barred from buying houses in certain communities and were the only Asian-American family in Levittown when it was first built. Historian Erika Lee describes how the use of the model minority was used in an attempt to delegitimize the critique from African-Americans, communists, labor activists and other marginalized groups.

Mao Zedong and the Chinese Communist Party's rise to power in China in 1949 and China's involvement in the Korean War positioned China as an American enemy. The politics of Communist China ignited a whole new wave of suspicion of Asian Americans' loyalty, only instead of the Japanese it was now the Chinese. A descendant of two Chinese immigrants, Winifred C. Chin states in the episode that "In the U.S., Asians are always perpetual foreigners." Chin's father was a paper son and wrote poetry for the China Daily News, which made him a target of FBI. Due to the paper son phenomenon, the FBI offered Chinese communities the chance to regularize their immigration status in exchange for disclosing any instance of fraudulent immigration paperwork, later to be called the Confession Program. Chin's father and other paper son and daughters were suspicious of such government programs and many chose not to disclose. Screenwriter David Henry Hwang said that the accusations made against the Chinese revealed no large plot of subversive activities and that these programs and tactics were government terrorism in order to intimidate a community. According to Hwang, these tactics fell into the realm of McCarthyism.

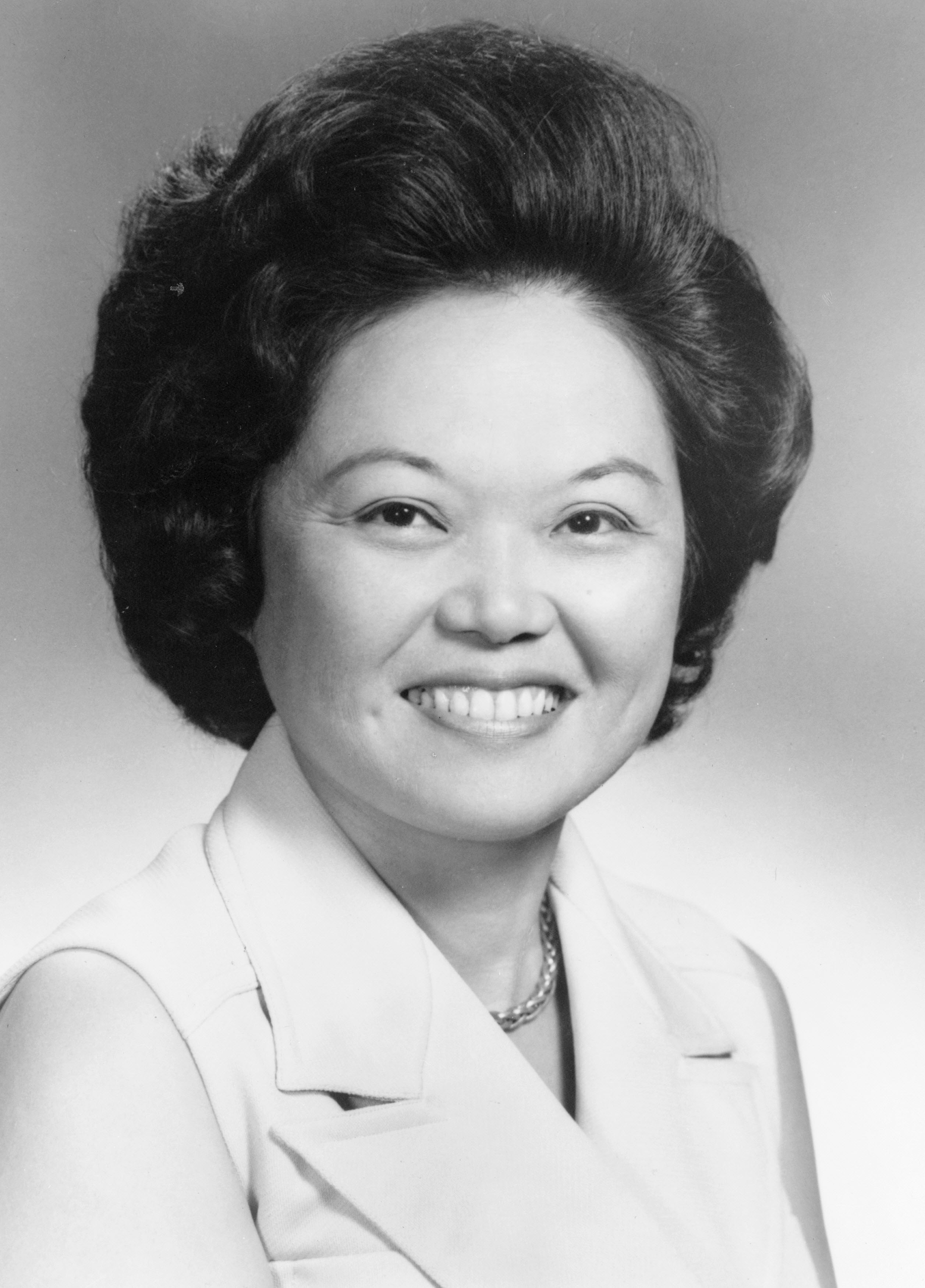
Photograph of Patsy Mink

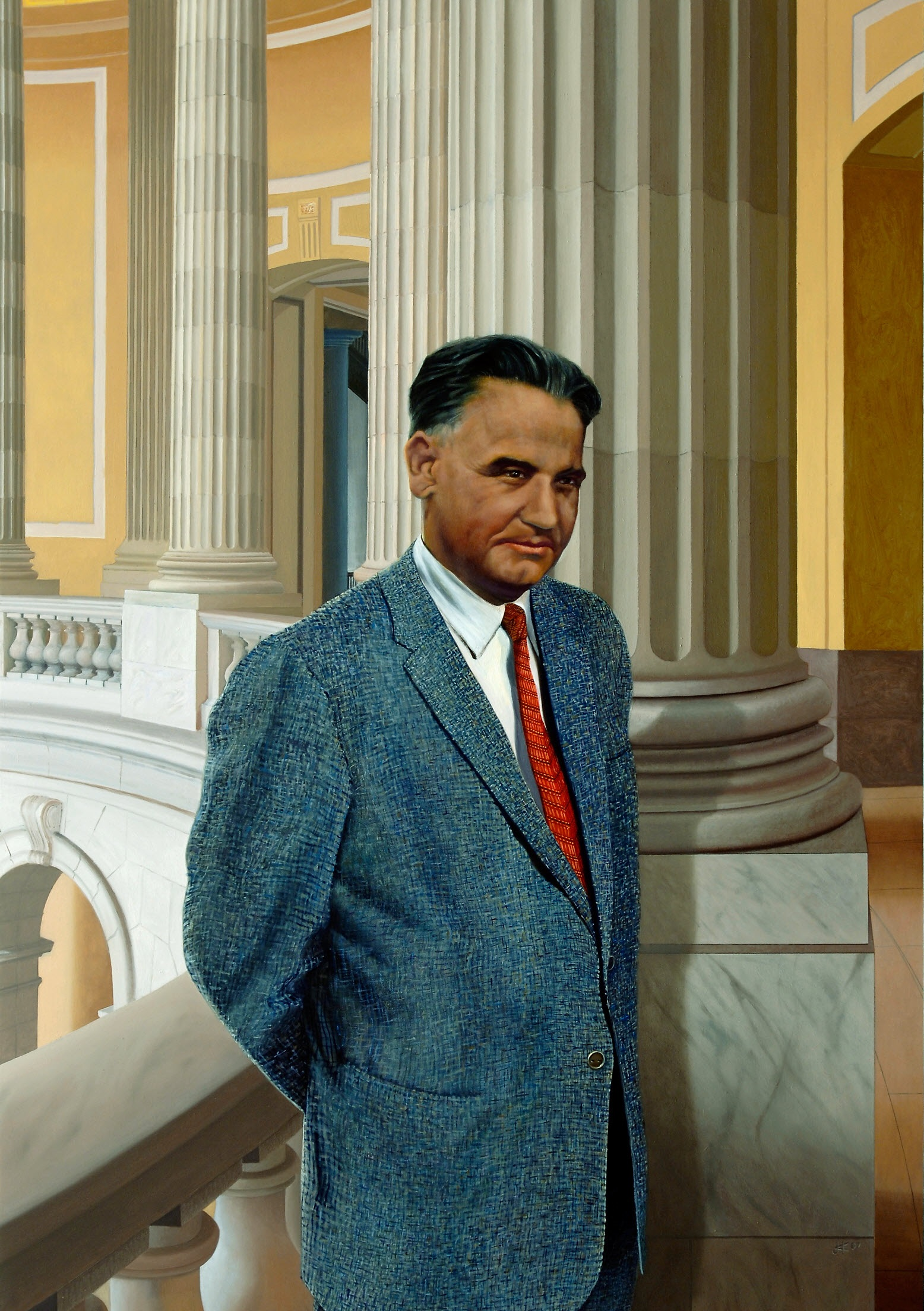
Painting of Dalip Singh Saund

The episode also details how Asian Americans started entering into more political roles across the country. Historian Ellen Wu describes how in 1950 Asians were the majority of Hawaii's population due to the past recruitment of Asian laborers for sugar plantations. Journalist Jeff Chang describes how large strikes on the island from various ethnic groups in the 1940 led to a shift in political power in favor of the working class majority. Patsy Mink campaigned for Democrats and is one example in the episode of Asian-Americans engaging more in politics. The election of Dalip Singh Saund of California in 1956 preceded the many elections to come in Hawaii after it became a state. Some noteworthy candidates who had run in these elections are Daniel Inouye, Hiram Fong, and Patsy Mink. Mink lost against Inouye due to both sexism and lack of support from the Democratic Party. In 1964, Mink runs again for Congress without the support of the Democratic Party and wins. Senator Tammy Duckworth spoke about Mink's contribution to both Asian Americans and women.

The civil rights movement improved the lives of Asians in unexpected ways, such as the repeal of immigration exclusion acts. The Hart-Celler Immigration Act of 1965 removed de facto discrimination against Southern and Eastern Europeans, Asians, as well as other non-Northwestern European ethnic groups from American immigration policy. By the early 21st century nearly 80% of immigrants were from Latin America or Asia.

The episode concludes with Randall Park and Jeff Chang talking about Bruce Lee and how Lee represented the first Asian hero in film and, alongside the Asian Americans aforementioned, a pivot of Asian representation in the U.S.

People featured in Episode Three are: Erika Lee, David Henry Hwang (playwright), Ellen Wu (historian) Jeff Chang, Judy Tzu-Chun Wu (historian), Helen Zia, Jane Hong (historian), Tammy Duckworth, Randall Park.

=== Episode 4: Generation Rising ===
Episode 4 aired on May 12, 2020. Episode Four primarily focuses on Asian Americans protesting and advocating in the fields, classrooms, and workforce.

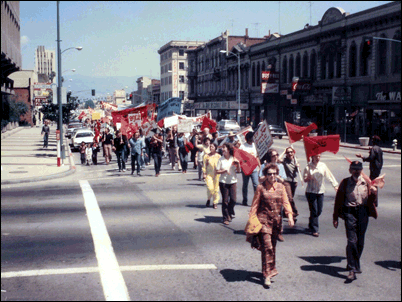
Image of members of the United Farm Workers marching down a street

Historian Alex Fabros, Jr.'s talks about his experience as a migrant farm worker. Fabros and Historian Alex Edillor spoke on how Filipino migrants began the grape strikes of the 1960s for better working conditions. Larry Itliong organized the Filipino migrant workers into the organization Agricultural Workers Organizing Committee (AWOC) and started the Delano Grape Strike of 1965. Growers brought in Mexican migrant workers in an attempt to break the strike. Cesar Chavez and Dolores Huerta, in collaboration with Larry Itliong, created a unified union between Filipino and Mexican migrant workers called the United Farm Workers. Alex Fabros, Jr. described this labor movement as the West coast's civil rights movement. The United Farm Workers' strike brought attention to the harsh conditions and nationwide support from college students, civil right leaders, and politicians. Growers were forced to sign the Union's demand due to intense global and economical pressure.

The episode shifts to discuss the Vietnam War. Alex Fabros, Jr. was drafted in the Vietnam War and, like Scott Shimabukuro and Mike Nakayama, describes the overt racism in the ranks and the internal reckoning he had with being an Asian-American fighting against the Vietnamese. Asian American women were also involved in the Vietnam War. Lily Lee Adams speaks on her experience as a military nurse and the prevalent sexual harassment she faced on and off base. Scott Shimabukuro and Mike Nakayama would later speak on their experiences at the Winter Soldier Investigation in 1971.

After the death of Martin Luther King Jr., student activists demanded Black studies curriculum. The call for Black studies inspired Asian Americans to also demand Asian-American studies in the classroom. Black and Brown students called for solidarity with people of colonized lands, dubbed the third world. Students of Color at San Francisco State, a school with predominantly white students, began demanding better representation in the classroom, including but not limited to hiring more minority faculty and expanding curriculum to relate to their lives and concerns. Laureen Chew and Penny Nakatsu describe their experience as San Francisco State students and members of the Third World Liberation Front (TWLF). The TWLF wanted an educational institution that served the people. Asian, Latino, Native American, and Black students joined forces to advocate for a School of Ethnic Studies. The Third World Liberation Front Strike of 1968 aimed to disrupt campus life in order to hasten the creation of a School for Ethnic Studies. S.I. Hayakawa threatened to arrest the students if they rioted and many students were arrested and confronted by police. However, after five months of protests, the San Francisco State administration finally agreed to establish a School of Ethnic Studies.

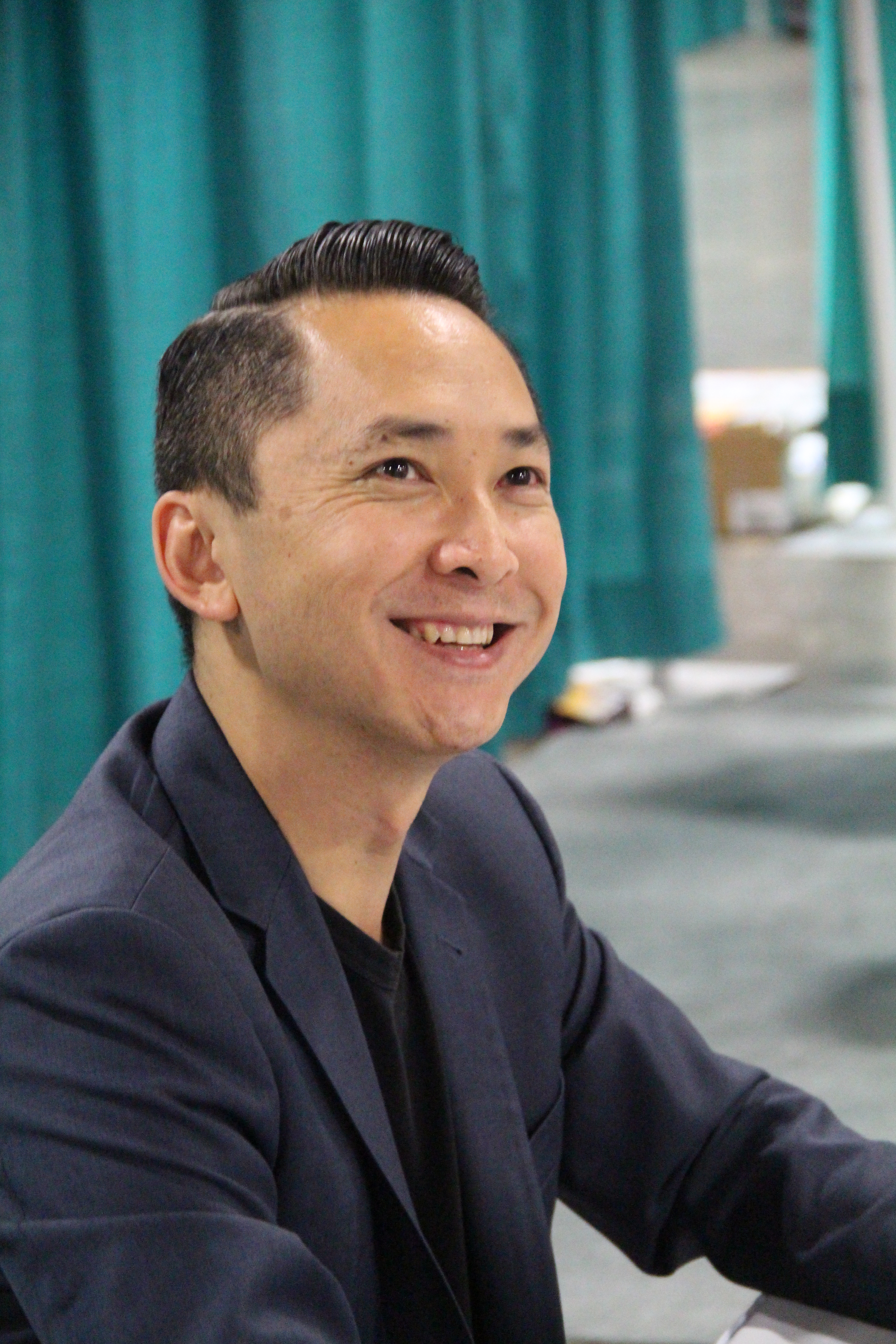
Photograph of Viet Thanh Nguyen (2015)

The solidarity between various Asian ethnicities at this strike brought forth the term Asian-American. The Asian American culture could be seen throughout mediums. Nobuko Miyamoto was a member of the band Yellow Pearl alongside Chris Kando Iijima and Charlie Chin, who sung about the Asian-American experience. Leland Wong's graphic design work featured in this episode alongside poet Lawson Inada and filmmaker Robert Nakamura.

After the Vietnam War ends, many refugees from Southeast Asia remain. Pulitzer Prize writer Viet Thanh Nguyen speaks on his family's experience as Vietnamese refugees and how narratives against the Vietnamese, such as the various Vietnam War movies, perpetuate violence against them even after the war. Filmmaker Ham Tran describes his experience as an immigrant from Vietnam to Southern California. Viet Thanh Nguyen said that his college professors showed him the necessity of "Asian American Studies as an activist practice"

The episode concludes by demonstrating Asian-American studies', and ethnic studies', growth since the Third World Liberation Front Strike. The political activism created opportunities for new educators to emerge, such as Laureen Chew, Daniel Phil Gonzales, and Alex Fabros, Jr.. Asian-American studies has even taken root in San Quentin State Prison through the San Quentin ROOTS program. And asks, what is next for Asian-Americans?

People featured in this episode: Alex Fabros, Jr., Alex Edillor (Delano historian), Scott Shimabukuro, Gordon H. Chang, Nobuko Miyamoto (folksinger), Brenda Sunoo (activist), Jan Sunoo (activist), Viet Thanh Nguyen, and Ham Tran

=== Episode 5: Breaking Through ===
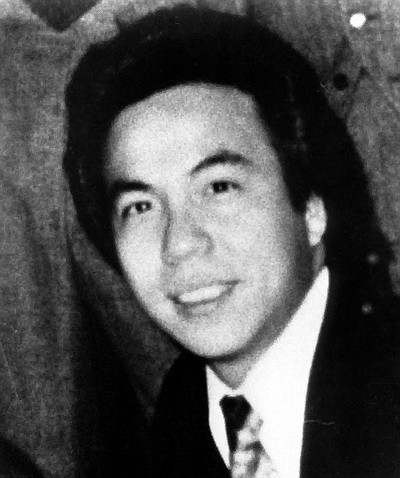
Photograph of Vincent Chin

Episode 5 aired on May 12, 2020. Episode Five focuses on contextualizing the tension and interrelated struggle Asian American community face between and with other marginalized communities.

The episode opens with clips of Hari Kondabolu and Margaret Cho's stand-up comedy. The episode contextualizes the murder of Vincent Chin within the 1979 oil crisis and a decline in the American car business which was blamed on Japanese car manufacturers. The murder of Vincent Chin, and the fact his assailants received no jail time, galvanized Mee Moua, Helen Zia, and other Asian-Americans to take the streets in protest. Civil rights organizations and individuals such as Jesse Jackson rallied behind the Asian-American community and Lily Chin, Vincent's mother. The murder of Vincent Chin would be the first federal civil rights trial for an Asian American.

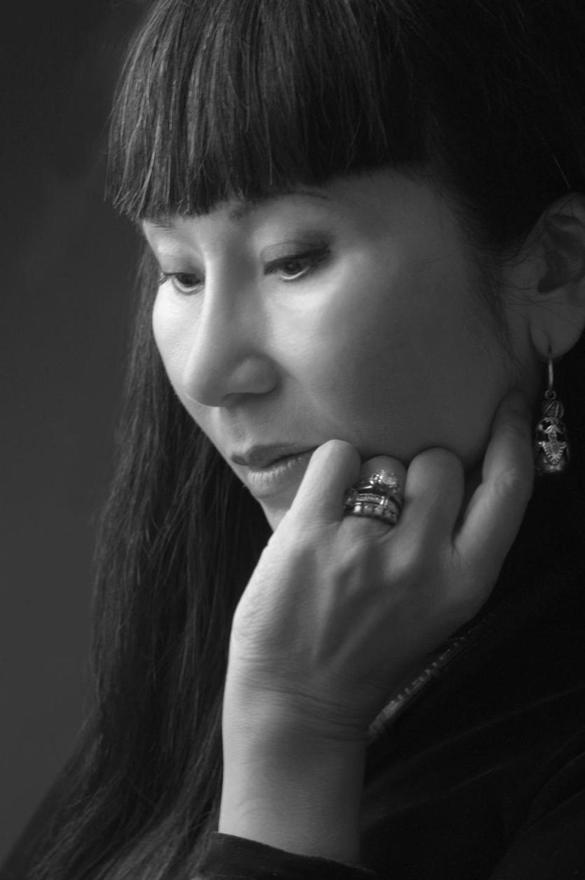
Photograph of Amy Tan, author of The Joy Luck Club

The episode details how in the 1980s the Asian population flips from majority U.S. born to foreign born. One example of the influx of Asian immigrants is Koreatown in Los Angeles. Writer and historian Brenda Stevenson speaks on how African-Americans continue to face discrimination in L.A. and how the beating of Rodney King in 1991 galvanized many in South L.A. to get back into the street. However, Angela Oh states that many of the new immigrants did not fully understand or appreciate the sacrifices of African Americans during the civil rights movement. Furthermore, people in the Asian community sided with Latasha's killer, even though, as Jeff Chang argues, the killing of Latasha Harlins was very similar to the killing of Vincent Chin. The killing of Latasha Harlins and the acquittal of the police who beat Rodney King were catalysts for the 1992 L.A. Riot. Jeff Chang also described how the riots were, for him, symbolic of the Rainbow Coalition dream going up in smoke. Korean immigrants were forced to restart their lives after many business were destroyed. On May 2, 1992, a peace rally is held in Koreatown with an estimated 30,000 attendees. The episode states that new Korean-American leaders worked with African-American leadership to continue forward together, rather than adversaries.

The rise in Asian-American in mainstream culture could be seen when the episode highlights media such as All American Girl, American Desi, and The Joy Luck Club. Jerry Yang reflects on his journey with co-creating Yahoo!. Historian Annalee Saxenian speaks on how many of the large startups of the 1990s and early 21st century were Asian Americans. Journalist K. Oanh Ha spoke on the disparities between Asian-Americans in technology sector, some being startups CEOs and others and others doing low paying piece work.

Tereza Lee speaks on her and her family experience of being undocumented in the United States. Tereza Lee's school director, Ann Monaco, appealed Tereza's immigration status to Senator Dick Durbin, who would later go onto draft the DREAM Act, which was bipartisan at that time. Tereza Lee became the first DREAMer.

However, immigration policy would shift from creating a pathway for undocumented individuals to detaining and deporting them after the September 11th attacks. Hari Kondabolu describes how after 9/11 many people were being beaten up or harassed due to their brown skin, including Indian and Sikh people. The murder of Balbir Singh Sodhi is one such instance mentioned in the episode. Norman Mineta reflects on discussions he heard in the White House that hoped the rise in Arab hate would not escalate into repeating the discrimination that Mineta and other Japanese faced in 1942 with internment camps. Kondabolu said that even though there were not overt concentration camps that there was still quiet and quick deportations, such as the case of Ansar Mahmood. The episode brings to light how the call from immigration rights activists united various groups together to protest the passage of the DREAM Act and other immigrant protections, echoing past coalitions of solidarity between marginalized groups in the United States.

The episode concludes with a firm assertion that Asian-Americans, their history, and their experiences will always have a place in the United States and deserve to be heard and retold.

People featured in this episode: Hari Kondabolu, Margaret Cho, Mee Moua, Viet Thanh Nguyen, Jeff Chang, Angela Oh, Alex Ko, Jerry Yang, Randall Park, K. Oanh Ha (journalist), Annalee Saxenian (historian), Tereza Lee (pianist), Norman Mineta

== Impact ==
The series was made free to the public after the May 16, 2021 Atlanta spa shootings.

The docu-series has been referenced as potential source material for curriculum by proponents and Illinois lawmakers of the Teaching Equitable Asian American Community History Act (TEAACH), which requires all public elementary schools and high schools to have a unit dedicated to Asian American history. The TEAACH act was passed after an increase in attacks and xenophobia against Asians during the COVID-19 pandemic.

== Awards ==
The series won a Peabody Award in 2021.
