= Anne M. Andrews =

American neuroscientist

- Education: Pennsylvania State University, American University, National Institute of Mental Health
- Known for: Study of the serotonin system, Nanoscience, Neuroscience
- Scientific career
- Fields: Neuroscience, Chemistry, Nanoscience
- Workplaces: University of California, Los Angeles
- Doctoral advisor: Dr. Dennis L Murphy

Anne M. Andrews is an American academic, the Richard Metzner Endowed Chair in Clinical Neuropharmacology, Professor of Chemistry & Biochemistry, and Professor of Psychiatry & Behavioral Sciences at the University of California, Los Angeles. Andrews is known for her work on the study of the serotonin system with a special focus on how the serotonin transporter modulates complex behaviors including anxiety, mood, stress responsiveness, and learning and memory.

== Career ==
Andrews' research has advanced both basic and translational research questions in chemical neuroscience. She leads an interdisciplinary research team at UCLA engaged in the development of nanomaterial based in vivo biosensors for neurotransmitters. In addition to the design of new tools for neuroscience, her research team has used genetic and pharmacologic animal models to interrogate the molecular basis of function in the serotonin system and how this system interacts with other neurotransmitter networks. Such studies are intended to extend understanding of anxiety disorders and neurodegenerative disorders, including Parkinson's disease and Alzheimer's disease.

Andrews' research career has focused on the neurochemistry of the brain's serotonin system. One of her goals is the design of sensors which would be broadly applicable to all neurotransmitters, and other biologically relevant small molecules. Andrews is a recipient of an NIH Director's Transformative Research Award in support of her research efforts to develop such sensors which would enable interrogating how information is encoded across diverse pathways associated with chemical neurotransmission. Andrews was one of the earliest advocates for the BRAIN Initiative and has been a longstanding advocate for importance of supporting research at the nexus of nanoscience and neuroscience to support research advances in fields including chemical connectomics.

== Education, research, and service ==
Andrews grew up in Pittsburgh and discovered her passion for science, and most especially chemistry, during her middle school science classes. She would go on to receive her B.S. in Chemistry Pennsylvania State University where during her time as a student she was an intern in the Toxicology and Forensic Pathology Departments at the Pittsburgh Coroner's Office. It was in this environment that Andrews has shared that she received a more nuanced exposure to bioanalytical chemistry, instrumentation, chromatography, and handling biological samples. Andrews would subsequently work as an analytical chemist at Hazleton Laboratories in Vienna, VA.

In support of her expanding research interests in the biomedical sciences, Andrews pursued and received her Ph.D. in Chemistry from the American University where her thesis research was performed in the laboratory of Dr. Dennis L. Murphy at the National Institute of Mental Health (NIHM). Andrews was as an NIH Predoctoral Fellow and U.S. Department of Education Fellow during her graduate studies. After receiving her doctorate, Andrews continued her research at the NIMH as a postdoctoral fellow and subsequently was a senior staff fellow until 1998. During her time at the NIMH, Andrews was a leader in the earliest studies on animal models of serotonin transporter deficiencies. She also discovered and profiled a novel serotonin neurotoxin, 2'NH2-MPTP. Prior to joining the faculty at UCLA, Andrews was a faculty member in the Department of Chemistry at her undergraduate alma mater Pennsylvania State University.

In the areas of service, Andrews is Associate Editor for the ACS Chemical Neuroscience journal. Andrews is President-elect of the International Society for Serotonin Research and a member of the American College of Neuropsychopharmacology, the Society for Neuroscience, the American Chemical Society, and the Society for Electroanalytical Chemistry. At UCLA, Andrews is a member of the California Nanosystems Institute, the Semel Institute for Neuroscience & Human Behavior, and the Hatos Center for Neuropharmacology. Andrews was involved with the team proposal for the BRAIN Initiative and has also elaborated independently on the opportunities and potential associated with advancing such research frontiers, including for the study of chemical connectomics.

== Notable publications ==
- Andrews AM, Murphy DL (March 1993). "Sustained depletion of cortical and hippocampal serotonin and norepinephrine but not striatal dopamine by 1-methyl-4-(2'-aminophenyl)-1,2,3,6-tetrahydropyridine (2'-NH2-MPTP): a comparative study with 2'-CH3-MPTP and MPTP". Journal of Neurochemistry. 60 (3): 1167–70. doi:10.1111/j.1471-4159.1993.tb03271.x. PMID 8094744.
- Andrews AM, Murphy DL (December 1993). "Fluoxetine and desipramine selectively attenuate 2'-NH2-MPTP-induced depletions in serotonin and norepinephrine". European Journal of Pharmacology. 250 (2): 215–21. doi:10.1016/0014-2999(93)90384-T. PMID 8112382.
- Bengel D, Heils A, Petri S, Seemann M, Glatz K, Andrews A, Murphy DL, Lesch KP (March 1997). "Gene structure and 5'-flanking regulatory region of the murine serotonin transporter". Brain Research. Molecular Brain Research. 44 (2): 286–92. doi:10.1016/S0169-328X(96)00234-3. PMID 9073170.
- Perez XA, Andrews AM (February 2005). "Chronoamperometry to determine differential reductions in uptake in brain synaptosomes from serotonin transporter knockout mice". Analytical Chemistry. 77 (3): 818–26. doi:10.1021/ac049103g. PMID 15679349.
- Omiatek DM, Bressler AJ, Cans AS, Andrews AM, Heien ML, Ewing AG (2013). "The real catecholamine content of secretory vesicles in the CNS revealed by electrochemical cytometry". Scientific Reports. 3 1447. Bibcode:2013NatSR...3.1447O. doi:10.1038/srep01447. PMC 3596796. PMID 23486177.
- Andrews AM, Weiss PS (October 2012). "Nano in the brain: nano-neuroscience". ACS Nano. 6 (10): 8463–4. Bibcode:2012ACSNa...6.8463A. doi:10.1021/nn304724q. PMID 23088783.
- Perez XA, Bressler AJ, Andrews AM, Michael AC, Borland LM (2007). Michael AC, Borland LM (eds.). Determining Serotonin and Dopamine Uptake Rates in Synaptosomes Using High-Speed Chronoamperometry. Frontiers in Neuroengineering. CRC Press/Taylor & Francis. ISBN 9780849340758. PMID 21204396.
- Andrews AM (May 2013). "The BRAIN Initiative: toward a chemical connectome". ACS Chemical Neuroscience. 4 (5): 645. doi:10.1021/cn4001044. PMC 3656756. PMID 23862750.
- Alivisatos AP, Andrews AM, Boyden ES, Chun M, Church GM, Deisseroth K, Donoghue JP, Fraser SE, Lippincott-Schwartz J, Looger LL, Masmanidis S, McEuen PL, Nurmikko AV, Park H, Peterka DS, Reid C, Roukes ML, Scherer A, Schnitzer M, Sejnowski TJ, Shepard KL, Tsao D, Turrigiano G, Weiss PS, Xu C, Yuste R, Zhuang X (March 2013). "Nanotools for neuroscience and brain activity mapping". ACS Nano. 7 (3): 1850–66. Bibcode:2013ACSNa...7.1850A. doi:10.1021/nn4012847. PMC 3665747. PMID 23514423.

== Awards ==
- National Institute of Health Director's Transformative Research Award, 2017
- Elected member, American College of Neuropyschopharmacology
- Fellow, Collegium Internationale Neuropsychopharmacologicum
- Fellows Award for Research Excellence, National Institute of Health
- Outstanding Young Analytical Chemist Award, Eli Lilly
- Research Award, American Parkinson Disease Association
- Councillor, Serotonin Club
- Independent Investigator Award, NARSAD
- Postdoctoral Intramural Research Training Award, National Institutes of Health
- Predoctoral Intramural Research Training Award, National Institutes of Health
- Fellowship, United States Department of Education
- Member, Sigma Xi Scientific Research Society
