= Communication aesthetics =

Communication Aesthetics is a theory devised by Mario Costa and Fred Forest at Mercato San Severino in Italy in 1983. It is a theory of aesthetics calling for artistic practice engaging with and working through the developments, evolutions and paradigms of late twentieth century communications technologies. Observing the emerging supremacy of networks over subjects, it called for an artistic approach that was both adapted to, and invested in this changing techno-social arena.

== Background ==
At the occasion of Artmedia, on Video Art organized by Mario Costa, Professor of Aesthetics at the University of Salerno, Fred Forest had been invited to enact a performance and installation involving the Italian National Television Broadcaster (RAI). The ensuing encounter revealed their mutual enthusiasm and interest in the evolution of the place of art in society given then developing communications technologies. Following an evening of intense discussion they wrote and signed a manifesto with Argentinian artist Horacio Zabala acting as witness. From the next day onwards, they established a list of artists whose practises reflected the artistic movement they had thus established. As a result, Roy Ascott, Antoni Muntadas, Stéphan Barron, Marc Denjean, Natan Karczmar, Jean-Claude Anglade, Mit Mitropoulos, Christian Sevette, Robert X Adrian, Jean-Marc Philippe, Wolfgang Ziemer Chrobatzek, Tom Klinkowstein, Eric Gidney, Ugo la Petria, Horacio Zabala, Daniel Dewaele and Piotr Kowalski expressed their alignment with the informal international group. Derrick de Kerckhove, director of the Marshall McLuhan Program in Culture and Technology at the University of Toronto, in direct communication with Fred Forest and Mario Costa, then set up a Canadian group titled “Strategic Arts” responding to the same concepts and objectives and in which Norman White was involved.

Communication Aesthetics is currently intact, though for geographical reasons it is today broken up into three distinct spheres of thought, action and intercession:

- Mario Costa holds positions and furthers action within the universities of Salerno and Naples in Italy
- while Fred Forest is active in France as professor at the University of Nice Sophia Antipolis and currently the National Art School of Cergy, Sorbonne Paris 1
- and Derrick de Kerckhove upholds the North American connection as Director of the Marshall McLuhan programme at the University of Toronto.

== Theory ==
In an article first published in French in 1985 and available online in English, Fred Forest outlines the purpose of Communication Aesthetics:

“Electrical, electronic and computer technology have now brought us firmly into communication society. This technology is at the heart of changes which have come about in social reorganization over a century, thus modifying not only our physical environment but also our mental system of representation. Electricity, electronics and computers today provide artists with new instruments of creation. The way our surroundings are being transformed in this direction a little more each day, together with our continually evolving adjustment with an ever-changing reality, is doubtless what is most important. This is why we must constantly reconsider our perceptions in order to apprehend the world in which we live.”

In short, Communication Aesthetics claims that a concomitant evolution in technologies of communication and strategies in art would have democratized (and thus demystified) the means of artistic production thus replacing the purpose of art as material production with the purpose of art as social interaction: “the artist now intervenes directly on reality, that is to say the carries out his symbolic and aesthetic activity using different means from those he has used up to now.” But Communication Aesthetics pushing this position further, by calling for an interactive intervention on reality, one that plays with the spectator in both meanings of the phrase.

This play is in turn a form of power play as it questions the labelling and limitations of figures of authority. The political ramifications of Communication Aesthetics are openly acknowledged by the founders, indeed they are called for: “In turn, the artist becomes a " social operative ", he becomes a social performer. The scaling down and the provocation of power, and its recuperation as a form of play, belong to the field of art. The responsible artist knows this power as his, and confronts the surrounding world with it.”

The socio-political position-taking goes further still, as the artists call for the recognition of the formative as well as informative nature of technology, and particularly information technologies: “It must be admitted once and for all that the history and genesis of the configurations of the imaginary are indelibly engraved in the "technologies" upon which our perception is utterly dependent - and thus today engraved in the "technologies" of communication.” It is this analysis of the formal and functional aspects of communication that Communication Aesthetics calls for.

Communication Aesthetics pushes the psycho-physiological implications of technological innovations further still, elaborating on their concomitant modification of our concepts of Space and Time. Just as the auto mobile changed our approach and experience of home and locality, so too Communication Aesthetics posited that IT innovations would change our approach to human interaction. “The hooking-up of computers to each other, and also to other machines, is a fore-runner of the opening out of the telecommunications network and the abolition of certain constraints of distance.” And, once again, it is for the artist to understand and harness these modifications and constraints so as to engage with these evolutions in the name of communication: “We can but remark that all these transformations brought about by media systems are, without our knowing it, reorganising our whole system of aesthetic representation.”

Lastly, Communication Aesthetics engages with another more problematic implication of technological innovations, the increasing intangibility of perception and sensuality resulting from the rise of the virtual. Indeed, far from encouraging this lapse into asociality or asensuality, Communication Aesthetics seeks to frame these emerging problems rather than shy away from them. Once again, Communication Aesthetics seeks to lay claim to societal relevance and influence by allying communications innovations and artistic innovations on the levels both formally and functionally.

"The goal of Communication artists is certainly not to produce first level meanings, but above all to make us aware as to how, in the end, the generalised practice of Communication interreacts on the whole of our sensory system. This evolution is about to put into place the data for a " new awareness " at the edge of our perception, and then, along with new " ways of feeling ", it will open up new aesthetic paths."

== Examples ==
- 1972 " Talk out", Douglas Davis, Everson Museum, Syracuse
- 1973 "Archéologie électronique du présent", Fred Forest, Galerie Germain, Paris
- 1974 "Manhattan is an Island", Ira Schneider
- 1975 "Teleshock/Telexchange", Fred Forest TV France 2
- 1975-1977 "Aesthetic Research in Telecommunications: Satellite Arts Project", Kit Galloway and Sherry Rabinowitz, NASA's Goddard Space Flight Center, Maryland and the Educational Television Center, Menlo Park, California
- 1977 " Satellite Telecast", Douglas Davis. Nam June Paik, Ducumenta 6, 1977
- 1980 " Hole in Space", Kit Galloway and Sherry Rabinowitz, New York/ Los Angeles
- 1980 "Art Box", Robert Adrian X, réseau international de 35 artistes crée avec Gottfried Bach d'IP Sharp
- 1982 "Levittown", Tom Klinkowstein, Centre Culturel Hooggt, Utrecht
- 1984 "Electronic Cafe '84", a 6-week civic networking project during the Los Angeles Olympic Arts Festival (prototype for Electronic Café International (ECI)), Kit Galloway and Sherrie Rabinowitz, Los Angeles
- 1985 "La plissure du texte", Roy Ascott, Electra, Musee Art Moderne Ville de Paris
- 1985 "Sundown", Mit Mitropoulos
- 1985 "Contes et clips modulaires", les "Immatériaux", Centre Georges Pompidou, Paris
- 1989 "Hommage to Mondrian", Fred Forest, Tecnettronica, Naples avec Mario Costa
- 1989 Electronic Café International (ECI), Kit Galloway and Sherrie Rabinowitz, Santa Monica, California
- 1999, "Techno* Mariage", Sophie Lavaud/Fred Forest, Issy les Moulineaux

== Publications ==
- "Après l'Esthétique de l'Objet, l'Esthétique de la Communication ", Fred Forest, T.E.L. (Temps, Économie, Littérature), Paris, 27 janvier 1983
- "For an aesthetics of communication", Fred Forest, + - 0, N° 43, Bruxelles, October 1985
- "L'estetica dela communicazione", Mario Costa, Castelvicchi, Roma 1998
- " Les Transinteractifs," Actes du colloque sur la Transinteractivité, Centre culturel Canadien, 4-5 novembre, 1988; éd. D. de Kerckhove et Christian Sevette, Paris: SNVE 1990.
- Catalogue "Territoire des réseaux", Annick Bureaud, Galerie Pierre Nouvion + Imagina, Monaco 1996
- Of sociological art to the aesthetic of the communication, Mario Costa, Catalogue rétrospective Fred Forest, Paço das artes, São Paulo 2005
- "From the sociological art to the aesthetic of the communication, a mass humanism," Pierre Restany November 1994
- "Utopian Art in Reverse", Michaël Leruth, Routlegen December 2006
