= Ian Frazier bibliography =

A list of the published works of Ian Frazier, American writer.

== Books ==
=== Humor ===
- Frazier, Ian (1986). Dating your mom. New York: Farrar, Straus and Giroux.
- — (1996). Coyote v. Acme.
- — (2000). Lamentations of the father. Original version. Louisville, Ky.: Westminster John Knox Press.
- — (2008). Lamentations of the father. New York: Farrar, Straus and Giroux.
- — (2010). Humor me : an anthology of funny contemporary writing (plus some great old stuff, too). Ecco.
- — (2012). The cursing mommy's book of days. New York: Farrar, Straus and Giroux.
- — (2021). Cranial fracking. New York: Farrar, Straus and Giroux.

=== Non-fiction ===
- Frazier, Ian (1987). Nobody better, better than nobody. New York: Farrar, Straus and Giroux.
- — (1989). Great Plains. New York: Farrar, Straus and Giroux.
- — (1994). Family. New York: Farrar, Straus and Giroux.
- — (2000). On the rez. New York: Farrar, Straus and Giroux.
- — (2002). The fish's eye : essays about angling and the outdoors. New York: Farrar, Straus and Giroux.
- — (2005). Gone to New York : adventures in the city.
- — (2010). Travels in Siberia. New York: Farrar, Straus and Giroux.
- — (2016). Hogs Wild : Selected Reporting Pieces.
- — (2024). Paradise Bronx : The Life and Times of New York's Greatest Borough.
- — (2026). The Snakes That Ate Florida: Reporting, Essays, and Criticism.

=== Translations ===
- Kharms, Daniil (1998). It happened like this : stories and poems. Translated by Ian Frazier; pictures by Katya Arnold.

== Essays and reporting ==
- Frazier, Ian (February 26, 1990). "Coyote v. Acme". Shouts & Murmurs. The New Yorker.
- — (December 8, 2008). "The rap". Our Local Correspondents. The New Yorker. 84 (40): 72–81.
- — (August 3, 2009). "Travels in Siberia – I : the ultimate road trip". A Reporter at Large. The New Yorker: 36–49.
- — (September 20, 2010). "Parade of the night". Talk of the Town. Dept. of Hoopla. The New Yorker. 86 (28): 48, 50.
- — (November 7, 2011). "History Lesson". The Talk of the Town. Archive Dept. The New Yorker. 87 (35): 28.
- — (November 7, 2011). "Messages from Dr. Abravenel". Shouts & Murmurs. The New Yorker. 87 (35): 38–39.
- — (January 2, 2012). "99% Chance". Shouts & Murmurs. The New Yorker. 87 (42): 37.
- — (January 16, 2012). "Knights vs. Cyclones". The Talk of the Town. Matchup. The New Yorker. 87 (44): 20–21.
- — (January 30, 2012). "Evening Urgant". The Talk of the Town. Visiting Dignitary. The New Yorker. 87 (46): 18–19. Russian TV host Ivan Urgant.
- — (February 11–18, 2013). "The Toll". Our Local Correspondents. The New Yorker. 89 (1): 38–44. Hurricane Sandy and Staten Island.
- — (February 25, 2013). "Disclos'd". Shouts & Murmurs. The New Yorker. 89 (2): 36–37.
- — (March 4, 2013). "Tree person". The Talk of the Town. Ink. The New Yorker. 89 (3): 20–21.
- — (March 25, 2013). "Bare earth". The Talk of the Town. Last Rites. The New Yorker. 89 (6): 43.
- — (July 8–15, 2013). "School's out". The Talk of the Town. Up Life's Ladder. The New Yorker. 89 (20): 28, 30.
- — (September 30, 2013). "Community guns". The Talk of the Town. Red Hook Postcard. The New Yorker. 89 (30): 22–23.
- — (October 28, 2013). "Hidden city : New York has more homeless than it has in decades. What should the next mayor do?". Our Local Correspondents. The New Yorker. 89 (34): 38–49.
- — (December 23–30, 2013). "The Mountain". The Talk of the Town. Snowy Day Dept. The New Yorker. 89 (42): 38, 43. Salt stockpiles, Staten Island.
- — (March 24, 2014). "On Texas". Shouts & Murmurs. The New Yorker. 90 (5): 47.
- — (April 14, 2014). "Bus ride". The Talk of the Town. Here to There. The New Yorker. 90 (8): 22–23.
- — (April 14, 2014). "Blue bloods : the horseshoe crab is half-a-billion years old, but its existence may be threatened". Annals of Conservation. The New Yorker. 90 (8): 52–61.
- — (June 2, 2014). "Buildings and books". The Talk of the Town. Comment. The New Yorker. 90 (15): 23–24.
- — (June 2, 2014). "Do not cross". The Talk of the Town. Streetscape. The New Yorker. 90 (15): 26–27.
- — (July 28, 2014). "Deniers". Shouts & Murmurs. The New Yorker. 90 (21): 30.
- — (September 1, 2014). "Only you". The Talk of the Town. Where There's Smoke. The New Yorker. 90 (25): 22.
- — (February 16, 2015). "Russophilia". The Talk of the Town. Wild Nights Dept. The New Yorker. 91 (1): 22–23.
- — (March 16, 2015). "Of younger days". Shouts & Murmurs. The New Yorker. 91 (4): 33.
- — (March 23, 2015). "Forever young". The Talk of the Town. In the Ring. The New Yorker. 91 (5): 36–37.
- — (May 25, 2015). "Lack of Center". The Talk of the Town. Poesy Dept. The New Yorker. 91 (14): 25–26.
- — (June 29, 2015). "Security". The Talk of the Town. Newark Postcard. The New Yorker. 91 (18): 18–19.
- — (August 3, 2015). "Amo, Amas". The Talk of the Town. Dept. of Education. The New Yorker. 91 (22): 21.
- — (December 7, 2015). "Bronx dreams : a community project to change the world with art". Onward and Upward with the Arts. The New Yorker. 91 (39): 38–44.
- — (January 25, 2016). "Connected". The Talk of the Town. Brave New World Dept. The New Yorker. 91 (45): 21–22.
- — (March 7, 2016). "Marina's will". The Talk of the Town. Perseverance Dept. The New Yorker. 92 (4): 20. Marina Litvinenko.
- — (March 21, 2016). "Still looking". Shouts & Murmurs. The New Yorker. 92 (6): 45.
- — (August 8–15, 2016). "Outdone". Shouts & Murmurs. The New Yorker. 92 (24): 33.
- — (January 2, 2017). "Incident review". Shouts & Murmurs. The New Yorker. 92 (43): 29.
- — (February 27, 2017). "Why mummies?". Shouts & Murmurs. The New Yorker. 93 (2): 33.
- — (May 8, 2017). "Hindsight". The Talk of the Town. Letter from Oregon. The New Yorker. 93 (12): 17–18.
- — (June 3, 2019). "Creative". Shouts & Murmurs. The New Yorker. 95 (15): 25.
- — (December 30, 2019). "Coyote v. Acme". Shouts & Murmurs. The New Yorker. 95 (42): 10–11.
- — (April 5, 2021). "Guns down : with the number of shooting deaths rising, Shaina Harrison is teaching kids to turn anger into advocacy". Our Local Correspondents. The New Yorker. 97 (7): 40–47.
- — (July 22, 2024). "Paradise Bronx." Our Local Correspondents. The New Yorker 100 (21): 38–49.

== Poems ==
Title	Year	First published	Reprinted/collected
Greetings, friends! [2013]	2013	Frazier, Ian (December 23–30, 2013). "Greetings, friends!". The New Yorker. 89 (42): 103.	
Greetings, friends! [2014]	2014	Frazier, Ian (December 22–29, 2014). "Greetings, friends!". The New Yorker. 90 (41): 127.	
Greetings, friends! [2016]	2016	Frazier, Ian (December 19–26, 2016). "Greetings, friends!". The New Yorker. 92 (42): 91.	
Greetings, friends! [2020]	2020	Frazier, Ian (December 28, 2020). "Greetings, friends!". The New Yorker. 96 (42): 34–35.	
