= Lisa Martin (political scientist) =

American political scientist

Lisa L. Martin
- Education: California Institute of Technology (BS); Harvard University (PhD)
- Awards: Guggenheim Fellowship
- Scientific career
- Fields: Political science
- Workplaces: University of California, San Diego; Harvard University; University of Wisconsin, Madison
- Thesis: Coercive cooperation: Explaining multilateral economic sanctions (1989)
- Doctoral advisor: Robert Keohane
- Doctoral students: Virginia Page Fortna

Lisa Martin is an American political scientist. She is a professor of political science at the University of Wisconsin, Madison. She studies political institutions in international relations, including economic sanctions and cooperation between states. Martin was the first female editor of International Organization, where she also currently serves as a senior advisor to the journal's editorial board. In 2021, she was elected as president of the American Political Science Association for 2022-2023.

== Education and early career ==
Martin received a BS in biology from the California Institute of Technology in 1983. She then studied Government at Harvard University, earning a PhD in 1989. From 1989 until 1992, Martin was a member of the political science faculty at the University of California, San Diego. From 1992 until 1996, she was the John L. Loeb Associate Professor of the Social Sciences at Harvard University, and then from 1996 until 2008 she was the Clarence Dillon Professor of International Affairs there. In 2008 she moved to the University of Wisconsin, Madison.

== Career ==
Martin is an author or editor of seven books. Her first book, the 1992 publication Coercive Cooperation: Explaining Multilateral Economic Sanctions, studies the necessary conditions for international economic sanctions to be successful. Kenneth A. Rodman wrote that Coercive Cooperation was "an important book that ought to be consulted by all serious students of international cooperation and economic statecraft", summarizing its central conclusions as demonstrating "that institutions matter and that leadership cannot be exercised 'on the cheap.'" The text criticizes a game theory view of sanctions, stating that sanctions proponents characterize success so broadly (applying it to a range of outcomes from "renegotiation" to "influencing global public opinion), that the terminology of "winning" or "losing" stretches those concepts too far.

Martin's second book, Democratic Commitments: Legislatures and International Cooperation, was published in 2000. Contrary to the orthodoxy that international affairs are too anarchic to be meaningfully affected by the internal politics of democratic states, Martin demonstrated that the legislatures of stable democracies can increase the credibility of the commitments made by states to one another, which fosters international cooperation. Michael Tierney summarized the contribution of Democratic Commitments by writing: "when you finish reading this book, you will be convinced that legislatures have a surprisingly large and measurable impact on the probability of interstate cooperation involving established democracies". Comparing Martin's first and second books, Tierney wrote that "while Coercive Cooperation sought to identify the systemic sources of credibility, Democratic Commitments explores the domestic institutional sources of credibility."

Martin is also an author or an editor of two textbooks, including International Institutions: An International Organization Reader, and the editor of several volumes on international affairs, such as the Oxford Handbook of the Politics of International Trade. She has also published several widely cited articles, such as "The Promise of Institutionalist Theory" in International Security with Robert Keohane, and "Theories and Empirical Studies of International Institutions" in International Organization with Beth A. Simmons.

A 2019 citation analysis by the political scientists Hannah June Kim and Bernard Grofman listed Martin as one of the top 40 most cited women working as a political scientist at an American university. Martin has been a member of the editorial board of several major political science journals, including the American Journal of Political Science and the Journal of Politics. She was the first female editor of International Organization, where she also currently serves as a senior advisor to the journal's editorial board.

Martin was named a John Simon Guggenheim Memorial Foundation Fellow in 1999. In 2021, she was elected as president of the American Political Science Association for 2022-2023.

== Selected works ==
- Coercive Cooperation: Explaining Multilateral Economic Sanctions (1992)
- Democratic Commitments: Legislatures and International Cooperation (2000)
- Oxford Handbook of the Politics of International Trade (2015)

== Selected awards ==
- John Simon Guggenheim Memorial Foundation Fellow (1999)
- American Academy of Arts and Sciences (2025)
