= Alessandro Duranti =

Italian linguistic anthropologist

- Born: September 17, 1950 (age 76); Rome, Italy
- Title: Distinguished Professor of Anthropology
- Awards: John Simon Guggenheim Memorial Foundation

Academic background
- Education: University of Rome "La Sapienza"; University of Southern California

Academic work
- Discipline: Linguistic Anthropology
- Institutions: University of California, Los Angeles

Alessandro Duranti (born September 17, 1950) is Distinguished Research Professor of Anthropology and served as Dean of Social Sciences at UCLA from 2009 to 2016. He is a Fellow of the American Academy of Arts and Sciences.

== Education ==
Duranti was trained in linguistics at the Sapienza University of Rome (laurea, 1974), where he studied general linguistics and ethnolinguistics with Giorgio Raimondo Cardona (1943–1988), and at the University of Southern California (PhD, 1981), where he specialized in Bantu languages under Larry Hyman while working with Elinor Ochs on the conversational foundations of Italian word order patterns. His dissertation, The Fono: A Samoan Speech Event, based on 13 months of fieldwork in Falefā, on the island of 'Upolu in Samoa, focused on the language and social organization of the meeting of the local 'council' (fono) that he analyzed by extending Dell Hymes' Speech Event Model to include speechmaking across speakers and situations.

== Overview ==
Duranti fully embraced an anthropological perspective on language through his collaboration with Elinor Ochs during and after their fieldwork in (then Western) Samoa in 1978–79, 1981, and 1988. In 1980–81, Duranti was a postdoctoral fellow at the Australian National University where he was part of a Working Group on Language and Context under the direction of Roger Keesing. In 1980–81, the core group, which met regularly throughout the year, included Elinor Ochs, John B. Haviland, Penelope Brown, Steven Levinson, and Robert Van Valin, Jr. In 1983–84, Duranti was a postdoctoral fellow at the Laboratory of Comparative Human Cognition (LCHC) at the University of California, San Diego, directed by Michael Cole. After teaching at the University of Rome, Pitzer College, and the University of California at San Diego, Duranti joined the Anthropology Department at the University of California, Los Angeles in 1988. In the early 1990s, he carried out fieldwork among Samoan immigrants in Southern California to study, in collaboration with Elinor Ochs, on how second generation Samoan children were being socialized in the context of a bicultural, bilingual environment.

In 1994, Duranti published From Grammar to Politics: Linguistic Anthropology in a Western Samoan Village (University of California Press), where he proposed an ethnopragmatic approach, an integration of ethnography and grammatical analysis to study Samoan ways of speaking in political arenas and in more informal interactions. Duranti claimed that how speakers encode agency has a key role in constituting what he called "the moral flow of discourse." This was the beginning of his interest in how agency is expressed and enacted in different languages, a topic that he has since explored in a number of publications. In 1995–96, using a combination of participant-observation and videography, Duranti documented the political campaign for the U.S. Congress of Walter Capps, then Professor of Religious Studies at the University of California, Santa Barbara. In support of writing about this project, in 1999 he received a John Simon Guggenheim Memorial Foundation Fellowship.

Since the late 1980s, Duranti has had an active role in editing journals and books. In 1987 (in collaboration with Bambi Schieffelin) Duranti founded the journal IPrA Papers in Pragmatics. In 1990–1994, he was an associate editor of American Ethnologist and in 1999–2001 he was editor of the Journal of Linguistic Anthropology. In 1992, he co-edited with Charles Goodwin Rethinking Context: Language as an Interactive Phenomenon, a collection of essays that continues to be widely read and cited as one of the key references on the study of the relationship between language and context. After publishing Linguistic Anthropology (1997) a treatise on the field of linguistic anthropology for the Cambridge University Press series in linguistics, Duranti dedicated himself to editing a number of collections to make recent research on language and culture accessible to a wider range of students and scholars (Duranti 2001a, 2001b, 2004). He is currently editing the book series Oxford Studies in the Anthropology of Language, to which he has himself recently contributed by editing Rethinking Politeness with Henri Bergson, a collection of essays that revisit some of the common assumptions about politeness by engaging with an early little known lecture on politeness by Henri Bergson.”

In 2002, Duranti started a collaboration with legendary jazz guitarist Kenny Burrell, with the goal of documenting jazz culture and teaching jazz aesthetics to students in the social sciences. One product of their collaboration was a course on the culture of jazz aesthetics, where jazz musicians were invited to play and talk about their music. The video recording of their class, student concerts, and other events in which jazz is taught, played, and discussed at the university and elsewhere has produced hundreds of hours of audio visual documentation of the contemporary jazz scene in Los Angeles.

Duranti's 2015 book The Anthropology of Intentions: Language in a World of Others, builds on his long-held interest in on the limits of focusing on speakers' intentions for understanding language as action. His earlier critique of speech act theory is here expanded to a broader discussion of intentionality and intersubjectivity inspired by Edmund Husserl's writings and supported by examples drawn from three of his research projects: his ethnographic study of Samoan ways of speaking, the audio-visual documentation of the 1995–96 political campaign of Walter Capps for the U.S. Congress, and a study of the culture of jazz aesthetics and improvisation. Duranti demonstrates how "cognitive, emotional, and embodied dispositions [are] always embedded in an intersubjective world of experience." Duranti introduces into anthropological theory the novel concept of the intentional continuum to describe "a range of graded ways of being disposed or mentally (and sensorially) connected with some entity in the world." In his review of the book, the developmental psychologist Martin J. Packer demonstrates how the intentional continuum is a necessary expansion to the standard theory of mind found in John Searle:

The standard components of theory of mind—beliefs, desires, and goals—capture only a small part of this continuum. Searle's (1983) attempt to reduce all points on the continuum to the fundamental Intentional states of belief and desire seems less than satisfying…When we understand another person's actions, or grasp the meaning of their words, we are paying attention to one part or another of this continuum, "seeing as" in ways that have been shaped by the culture in which we live.

In her review of the book, the anthropologist and linguist Jane H. Hill writes that "Duranti aims here to move away from homogeneous characterizations of whole cultures as inattentive or attentive to mens rea toward richer and more deeply contextualized accounts of exactly when, by whom, and how such attention is given or withheld." Duranti's book is the subject of a 2017 Book Symposium in HAU: Journal of Ethnographic Theory, which includes response from Eve Danziger, Shaun Gallagher and the authors of the other featured book, The Concept of Action, N.J Enfield and Jack Sidnell.

Combining his interest in intentionality, intersubjectivity, and improvisation, Duranti has been more recently writing about cooperation and the conditions that trigger what he calls “interactional glitches,” involuntary missteps that interfere with the smooth completion of a joint task.

== Selected publications ==
- 1979 – (with E. Byarushengo and L.M. Hyman) Haya Grammatical Structure. Los Angeles: Department of Linguistics, University of Southern California.
- 1981 – The Samoan Fono: a sociolinguistic study – Canberra: The Australian National University, Pacific Linguistics Monograph B80
- 1992a – Etnografia del parlare quotidiano – Rome: La Nuova Italia Scientifica/Carocci Editore.
- 1992b – (Ed. with Charles Goodwin) Rethinking Context: Language as an Interactive Phenomenon. Cambridge: Cambridge University Press.
- 1994 – From Grammar to Politics: Linguistic Anthropology in a Western Samoan Village – Berkeley & Los Angeles: University of California Press.
- 1997 – Linguistic Anthropology. Cambridge:Cambridge University Press [Italian translation: Antropologia del Linguaggio. Roma: Meltemi; Spanish translation: Antropología Lingüistica. Madrid: Cambridge University Press]
- 2001 – (Ed.) Key Terms in Language and Culture. Malden, Mass.: Blackwell
- 2001 – (Ed.) Linguistic Anthropology: A Reader – Malden, Mass: Blackwell.
- 2004 – (Ed.) A Companion to Linguistic Anthropology – Malden, Mass: Blackwell
- 2007 – Etnopragmatica. La forza nel parlare. Rome: Carocci Editore
- 2009 – (Ed.) Linguistic Anthropology: A Reader. Second Edition – Malden, Mass: Wiley-Blackwell.
- 2012 – (with E. Ochs and B.B. Schieffelin) (Eds.) Handbook of Language Socialization. – Malden, Mass: Wiley-Blackwell.
- 2015 – The Anthropology of Intentions: Language in a World of Others – Cambridge, UK: Cambridge University Press.
- 2022 – (Ed.) Rethinking Politeness with Henri Bergson. Oxford: Oxford University Press.
- 2024 – (with R. George and R. Conley Riner) (Eds.) A New Companion to Linguistic Anthropology. Malden, Mass: Wiley-Blackwell.
