= Brian Wood (artist) =

American visual artist

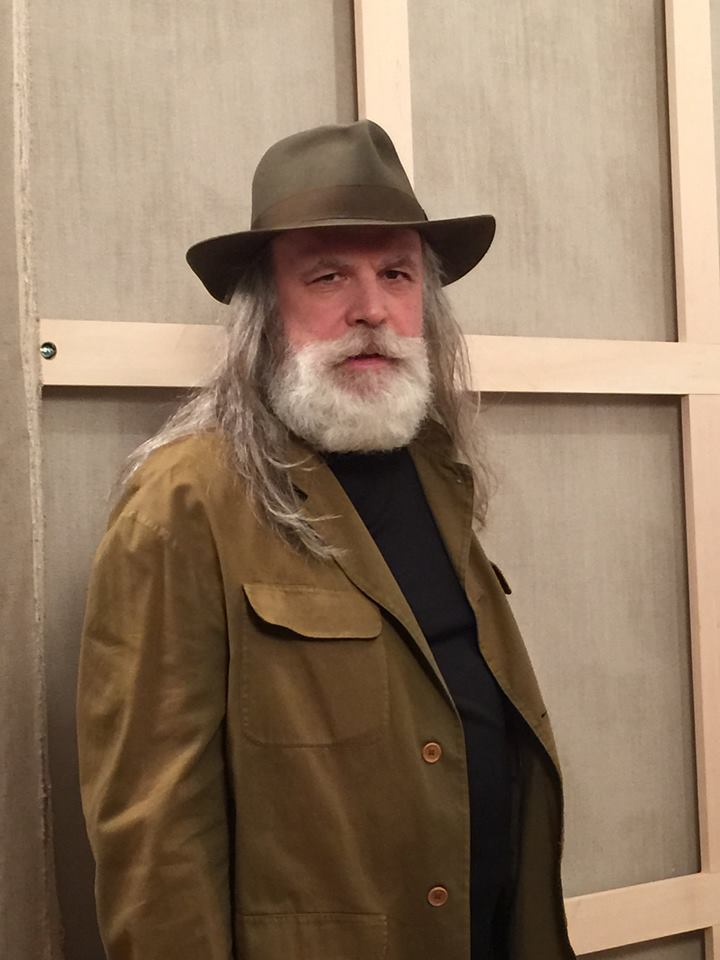
- Wood in his New York City studio, 2015
- Born: 1948 (age 77–78); Saskatoon, Saskatchewan, Canada
- Education: University of Saskatchewan B.A. Hunter College, New York M.A.
- Known for: Visual artist, Photography, Painting, Drawing and Printmaking
- Website: https://www.brianwoodstudio.com/

Brian Wood (born 1948) is a visual artist working in painting, drawing and printmaking and formerly with photography and film in upstate New York and New York City.

== Biography ==
Brian Wood was born in Saskatoon, Saskatchewan, Canada and grew up on a family farm in northern Saskatchewan (Brancepeth). He received a B.A. from the University of Saskatchewan in 1969 in physics and literature. Shortly after receiving his degree he moved to New York City and made paintings.

== Early career ==
During the next few years, he traveled and worked in Europe, spending much of his time in Greece. Wood made his first painting commission for Lord Byron's Chambers in Albany in London in 1972 and exhibited his prints at Redfern Gallery, London. Returning to New York, Wood earned his M.A. with concentrations in painting and filmmaking in 1975 at Hunter College. While studying he worked as a studio assistant to the painters Adolph Gottlieb and Ralph Humphrey. At Hunter he met Hollis Frampton and began working in film. He also met Michael Snow and crewed on Snow's film Rameau's Nephew (based on Denis Diderot's 1762 text Le Neveu de Rameau]. Wood made his first films Clearview and Fixt in 1974-1975. Clearview was first screened at Film Forum in New York in 1975.

Wood's early work was influenced by Hollis Frampton and Michael Snow, and like them, he continued his explorations in multiple media. In 1976 Wood began working with constructed multiple photographs. His very early photographic pieces, "Facing", 1976 (Collection: Metropolitan Museum of Art, NYC) and "Array", 1977 (Collection: Museum of Modern Art, NYC) were first exhibited in 1978 at the Whitney Museum (Downtown), New York. Galerie Marielle Mailhot in Montreal gave Wood his first solo show of photographs in 1979, soon followed by several solo museum exhibitions in Canada. Ydessa Hendeles mounted another solo exhibition in Toronto in 1980. The Canada Council awarded Arts Grants to Brian Wood in 1978, 1979, 1980 and 1982.

== Artistic career ==
John Szarkowski, Chief Curator of Photography, began collecting Wood's work for the Museum of Modern Art, New York in 1979, installing his photo-construction "Array", 1977 in the permanent galleries where it remained on permanent exhibition into the 1990s. "Array" and other works remain in the permanent collection. MoMA exhibited Wood's work in the 1982 traveling exhibition "Twentieth Century Photographs from the Collection of the Museum of Modern Art", "Big Pictures by Contemporary Photographers" in 1983 and "Color Photographs: Recent Acquisitions" in 1984. MoMA included Wood's work in the publication The Museum of Modern Art: The History and the Collection, with introduction by Sam Hunter, Abrams, 1984. Multiple Images: Photographs since 1965 from the Collection," published in 1993 also included Wood and his work appears in MoMA's 2002 book Walker Evans & Company by curator Peter Galassi.

During the 1980s Wood exhibited paintings, drawings and photographs in many gallery and museum exhibitions in the United States and internationally. In 1984 he was awarded a National Endowment for the Arts Fellowship. The Brooklyn Museum showed his work in the group show "Color in the Summer" in 1984. His work entered museum collections including the Brooklyn Museum, the Canadian Museum of Contemporary Photography, Ottawa, Museum of Contemporary Art, Montreal, Montreal Museum of Fine Arts, Art Gallery of Hamilton, and many others.

Brian Wood was awarded a Guggenheim Foundation Fellowship in 1999 in photography and graphics, recognizing his work in printmaking and photography.

Photographer James Casebere writes

Wood's works are biological, anatomical, spiritual and erotic. ... All this work seems to result from a deep internal investigation of the brain via the trauma of the body. And this mind body unity at the core of Wood's work reveals a cataclysmic trauma of spiritual proportions.

Wood's 2014 exhibition Enceinte, includes graphite drawings, ink/photo hybrids, and one early photograph.

== Collections ==
Wood's works are in the permanent collections of:

- the Museum of Modern Art,
- the Metropolitan Museum of Art,
- the Brooklyn Museum,
- the New York Public Library, New York
- the Corcoran Gallery of Art, Washington, D.C.;
- the Los Angeles County Museum of Art;
- the Museum of Fine Arts, Houston;
- the Davis Museum, Wellesley;
- the Tampa Museum of Art, Florida;
- the Museum Ludwig, Cologne;
- the Museum of Decorative Arts and the Museum of Modern Art, Prague;
- the National Gallery of Canada,
- the Canadian Museum of Contemporary Photography,
- the Artbank, Ottawa,
- the Art Gallery of Hamilton, Ontario;
- the Mendel Art Gallery, Saskatoon, Saskatchewan;
- the Kamloops Art Gallery, Kamloops, British Columbia;
- the Concordia Art Gallery,
- the Montreal Museum of Fine Arts, and
- the Museum of Contemporary Art, Montreal.

== Additional sources ==
- Yochelson, Bonnie. "25 Years/25 Artists" Julie Saul Gallery, New York, 2011
- Hawkey, Christian. "Stacked Graphene (A Lattice for Brian Wood)." Sordoni Art Gallery, Wilkes University, Pennsylvania, 2010.
- Esplund, Lance. "The Pencil of Nature." The Wall Street Journal, 8/2010.
