= Technoromanticism =

Human evolution

Technoromanticism is a term that describes how some people believe that modern technology can inspire creativity, bring back the idea of a "genius," and create a sense of unity. This is similar to the artistic and philosophical movement of the 18th and 19th centuries known as Romanticism, but by technological means. The term was first used in a 1999 book called Technoromanticism which showed how ideas from Romanticism were present in discussions about digital technology at that time.

== Concept ==
Stéphan Barron was the first to develop the concept of Technoromanticism between 1991 and 1996 for his doctoral thesis at the University Paris VIII. The main theme of his research is what he calls “Technoromantisme/Technoromanticism”, a neologism which he created and which has been adopted by other English-speaking researchers. Technoromanticism is the theory of links between art and new technologies, within the context of the threats posed to nature by technoscience and economic development. Technoromanticism also seeks to analyse the return of the human body within technological arts, formulating the hypothesis that a technological society needs a corporeal rebalancing of perceptions. Delayed for editorial reasons, his book Technoromantisme was published by l'Harmattan in 2003.

Technoromanticism attributes to technology the capacity to redeem humankind from its problems and bring about techno-utopias. According to this thesis, technoromanticism is idealistic. It also looks backwards, seeing in advanced technologies the opportunity to return to craft values, analogous to William Morris’ romance with Medieval guilds. It appeals to narratives of wholeness, against rationalism which is putatively reductive. Moves to invoke digital networks as a means of returning human society and the world to an organic whole could be regarded as technoromantic, as well as digital technology’s supposed religiously redemptive aspects.

The term “technoromanticism” influenced by its opposition technorationalism, targeted by critical theorists such as Theodor W. Adorno and Herbert Marcuse. One motivation for describing certain aspects of digital culture as ‘’technoromantic’’ is to signal that what many people claim about advanced networked computing is old fashioned and embedded in traditional ways of thinking, however innovative the technology. The term also buys into debates within the design methods movement about Rationalism and Romanticism, or in philosophy between objectivism and subjectivism, particularly as articulated by the philosopher Richard J. Bernstein. The term also encourages critique of commentators who seem to claim they are adopting postmodern ways of thinking when in fact they are referencing romanticism, or lapsing into what George Lakoff and Mark Johnson describe negatively as “armchair phenomenology.”

Contemporary scholar Kat Kitay argues "Today, we exist in a sea of technological complexity in which Romanticism is reborn: individualism in influencers, melancholy in doomscrolling, love in devices, fear in AI." This emergent movement uses among many other processes, ornate 3D-printed facades. The adherents of technoromanticism attribute an omnipotent, redemptive power to technology, which is supposed to solve all of humanities problems, as well as improving, democratising and simplifying work.

== Criticism ==
Technoromanticism is therefore mainly a pejorative term for a naïve attitude to what digital technologies are and may accomplish. As such the label may misrepresent the profound aspects of the philosophical movement of Romanticism as advanced by Schlegel and Schelling, and on whom many radical twentieth century thinkers have drawn, particularly Martin Heidegger. There are those who deliberately label their activity as technoromantic, such as the artist Stéphan Barron, who has adopted the word in a positive way to categorise his art.

The most potent opposition to technoromanticism is advanced from the positions of embodiment, situated cognition, Pragmatism, Phenomenology, and the strategies of Deconstruction as outlined in the context of digital computing by Winograd and Flores, Clark, Dreyfus and Coyne.
