= C. Edson Armi =

American architectural historian

- Awards: Guggenheim Fellowship (1999)

Academic background
- Education: Columbia University (BA, PhD)

Academic work
- Discipline: Art history
- Sub-discipline: History of architecture
- Institutions: University of California, Santa Barbara; University of Chicago; University of North Carolina at Chapel Hill

C. Edson Armi is an American historian of architecture. Armi is professor emeritus at the University of California, Santa Barbara.

== Biography ==
Armi received his B.A. from Columbia College in 1967, and his Ph.D. from Columbia University in 1973. His research spans Romanesque architecture and sculpture, Gothic art, and 20th century American car designs. He began his career at the University of Chicago as an assistant professor in 1974 before moving to the University of North Carolina at Chapel Hill as an associate professor in 1977. In 1992, Armi joined the faculty of the University of California, Santa Barbara.

In 1999, Armi received a Guggenheim Fellowship to work on a book on Romanesque building construction that was published in 2004.
