= Kit Galloway and Sherrie Rabinowitz =

American artist duo

Kit Galloway (born 1948) and Sherrie Rabinowitz (1950–2013) met in 1975 and worked collaboratively under the name Mobile Image. They co-founded the Electronic Café International (ECI), a cafe, networking centre, performance and workshop space and art hub in Santa Monica, California. Until Rabinowitz's death, they created numerous art works which could be categorized as communication aesthetics, telematic art, and digital theatre.
