= Ian Frazier =

American writer and humorist (born 1951)

Ian "Sandy" Frazier
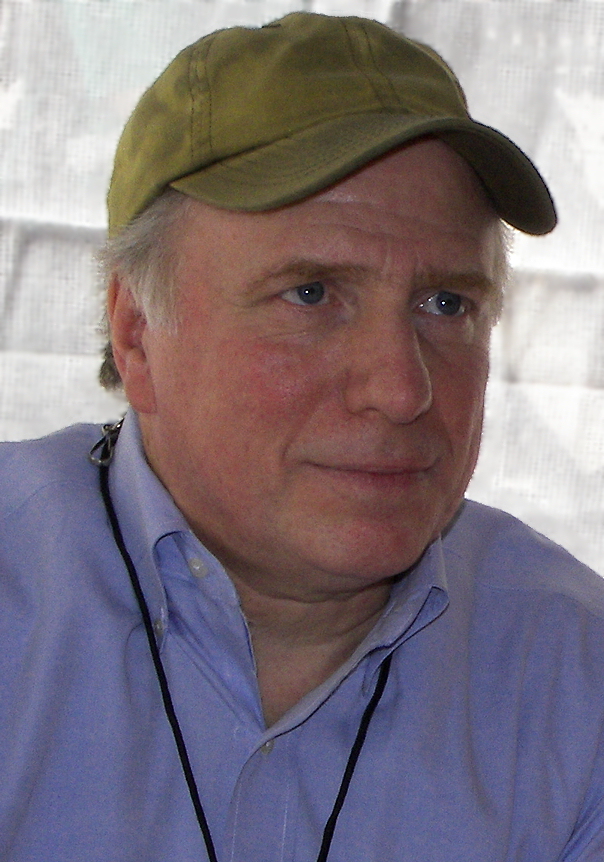
- Frazier in 2010
- Born: Ian Frazier; 1951 (age 74–75); Cleveland, Ohio
- Education: Harvard University
- Occupations: Non-fiction writer, humorist
- Spouse: Jacqueline Carey
- Writing career
- Period: 1974–present
- Notable works: Great Plains (1989); Coyote v. Acme (1990); Travels in Siberia (2010)

Ian Frazier (born 1951 in Cleveland, Ohio) is an American writer and humorist. His works include Great Plains and Coyote v. Acme, the latter of which served as the basis for the film Coyote vs. Acme (2026).

== Biography ==
Frazier grew up in Hudson, Ohio. His father, David Frazier, was a chemist, who worked for Sohio. His mother, Peggy, was a teacher, as well as an amateur actor and director, who performed in and directed plays in local Ohio theaters. He graduated from Western Reserve Academy in 1969 and from Harvard University in 1973.

== Writing career ==
Frazier wrote the 1989 non-fiction history Great Plains and 2010's non-fiction travelogue Travels in Siberia. He works as a writer and humorist for The New Yorker.

The New York Times critic James Gorman described Frazier's 1996 humor collection Coyote v. Acme as the occasion for "irrepressible laughter in the reader". In the title piece, Wile E. Coyote is suing Acme Corporation, the manufacturer of products such as explosives and rocket-propelled devices purchased by the coyote to aid in hunting the Road Runner; these products always backfire disastrously. The story served as the basis for the film Coyote vs. Acme, which was shelved in 2023 by Warner Bros. Discovery. In March 2025, American independent film distributor Ketchup Entertainment acquired the worldwide distribution rights to the film; it released theatrically on August 28, 2026.

Gorman rates Frazier's first collection, 1986's Dating Your Mom, as "one of the best collections of humor ever published".

== Personal life ==
His wife Jacqueline Carey and their daughter Cora are also writers.

== Awards ==
- 1989: Whiting Award
- 1997: Thurber Prize for American Humor, for essay collection Coyote v. Acme
- 2009: Thurber Prize for American Humor, for essay collection Lamentations of the Father
