= Richard Coyne =

Professor at the University of Edinburgh

Richard Coyne is a professor at the University of Edinburgh and author of several books on the implications of information technology and design, published by MIT Press, Routledge, and Bloomsbury Academic. His work is strongly influenced by the writings of the philosopher Hans-Georg Gadamer on hermeneutics and interpretation theory, particularly as developed by Coyne's colleague Adrian Snodgrass in the 1990s, and with whom he co-authored the book Interpretation in Architecture: Design as a Way of Thinking.

He is Professor of Architectural Computing and was Head of the School of Arts, Culture and Environment (which covered the disciplines of architecture, history of art and music) until its merger with Edinburgh College of Art. Coyne is an architect by training and brings a design-oriented and spatial understanding to his research and writing on digital themes.

== Works ==
1. Coyne, Richard. 2019.Peirce for Architects. London: Routledge, 135 pages.
2. Coyne, Richard. 2018.Network Nature: The Place of Nature in the Digital Age. London: Bloomsbury Academic, 245 pages.
3. Coyne, Richard. 2016. Mood and Mobility: Navigating the Emotional Spaces of Digital Social Networks. Cambridge, MA: MIT Press, 378 pages.
4. Coyne, Richard. 2011. Derrida for Architects, London: Routledge.
5. Coyne, Richard. 2010. The Tuning of Place: Sociable Spaces and Pervasive Digital Media. Cambridge, MA: MIT Press, 330 pages.
6. Snodgrass, Adrian, and Richard Coyne. 2006. Interpretation in Architecture: Design as a Way of Thinking. London: Routledge, 332 pages.
7. Coyne, Richard. 2005. Cornucopia Limited: Design and Dissent on the Internet. Cambridge, Massachusetts: MIT Press, 284 pages.
8. Coyne, R.D. 1999. Technoromanticism: Digital Narrative, Holism and the Romance of the Real, Cambridge, Massachusetts: MIT Press, 398 pages.
9. Coyne, R.D. 1995. Designing Information Technology in the Postmodern Age: From Method to Metaphor, MIT Press, Cambridge, Massachusetts, 399 pages.
10. Coyne, R. D., Rosenman, M. A., Radford, A. D., Balachandran, M. and Gero, J.S. 1994. Knowledge- Based Design Systems, Japanese edition published by Ohm-Sha, Tokyo, 522 pages (First edition by Addison Wesley, Reading Massachusetts, 1990, 576 pages).
11. Coyne, R. D. 1988. Logic Models of Design, Pitman, London, 317 pages.
