= Stéphan Barron =

French artist

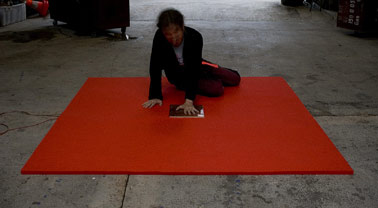
CONTACT, Planetary artwork by Stéphan Barron. "Two seemingly unconnected copper plates in two different locations. When a someone places a hand on the first plate, the second will begin to warm up".

Stéphan Barron is a contemporary artist. He has developed the ideas of Planetary Art and Technoromanticism through his artworks since the 1980s. Planetary Art is an art form which takes the Earth in its planetary dimension as its basis for artistic creation. Technoromanticism is the theory of links between art and new technologies within the context of the threats posed to nature by technoscience and economic development. Technoromanticism also seeks to analyse the return of the human body within technological arts, formulating the hypothesis that a technological society needs a corporeal rebalancing of perceptions.

According to art critic Pierre Restany, "Stéphan Barron occupies, in Europe, a prominent place in the search for a spatio-temporal definition of the video image."

== Selected works and projects ==
All artworks are documented in Barron's HDR on the Technoromanticism website.

=== Planetary artwork ===
==== Thaon/New York ====
Satellite audio transmission and slow-scan TV between the medieval church of Thaon in Normandy, France, and The Cloisters in New York City - June 1987. Only satellite transmission by a European artist, this artwork anticipates global or planetary art which developed later with the internet.

==== Orient Express ====
Stéphan Barron rode the Orient Express from Paris to Budapest and every hour took a Polaroid of what he saw. In Budapest the 25 Polaroids of that one-way trip were scanned on computer and sent to Paris by modem. The same process was used from Budapest to Paris, and the 25 digitised Polaroids of the return trip were sent from Paris to Budapest - Institut Français, Budapest October 1987 - New version, exhibition at OSTRALE / DRESDEN - sept. 2010.

==== Berlin / Peking ====
Seven television sets showing images from the Berlin Wall and Berliners facing seven television sets showing images from China and the Great Wall.

==== Alice ====
Transtlantic installation for the transinteractifs - Paris / Toronto - November 1988

==== Lines (Traits) ====
Stephan Barron and Sylvia Hansmann followed the Greenwich Meridian by car from the English Channel to the Mediterranean Sea and from Villers-sur-Mer to Castillon de la Plana. With their car fax they regularly sent images and texts about their trip to other faxes located in eight different European locations (among them was Ars Electronica) - 1989.

==== Autoportrait ====
In the exhibition space, a robot arrow indicated where Stephan Barron could be found. Stephan Barron built this telephone-operated robot in collaboration with the engineer Jerome Gilbert, a specialist in home automation - 1991.

==== Les plantes de mon jardin ====
Every day, Stephan Barron sent images of the plants in his tiny garden from Hérouville in France by fax to Prague - Spala Galery, Prague - 1991.

==== À perte d’entendre ====
Linked by walkie-talkie to the Brandenburg Gate, Stephan Barron walked away from it eight successive times in eight different directions. Each time he lost audio contact, he there and then took a Polaroid picture. The project was carried out at the Brandenburg Gate, symbol of the immaterial border between east and west - Sakchewsky Galery, Berlin - 1991.

==== Le bleu du ciel ====
Two computers, one located in Tourcoing and the other in Toulon, were connected by telephone. They calculated in real time the average of the colours in the northern and southern skies. The same planetary interactive installation was shown between Paris and Munich in 1995 (Unesco Award) - Tourcoing School of Art - 1994.

==== Le jour et la nuit (Night and day) ====
Two computers, one in Brazil, one in Australia, averaged the images of the skies of the two countries - Arte tecnologia, São Paulo - 1995.

==== Ozon ====
Measurements taken of ozone produced by motor car pollution in the city of Lille, and measurements taken of ultraviolet radiation coming through the ozone layer were transformed into sounds via the Internet that were projected onto the streets of Roubaix and in the garden of the Old Treasury Building in Adelaide - Adelaide International Festival - 1996.

==== Eurotunnel ====
Stéphan Barron and Sylvia Hansmann travel by boat across the English Channel directly above the path of the Channel Tunnel; at regular intervals they throw buoys equipped with beacons linked to satellites. This marking out of the Channel's path is eventually dispersed by the wind and ocean currents - Project.

==== Com-post ====
Online artwork - Web surfers send in their texts by e-mail. Poetry, texts expressing love and hate or utopian views, all forms are accepted. All are then composed! http://www.com_post.org - 2000

==== Fusil ====
Online artwork on guns - 2003 - http://www.fusil.biz

==== corpo@corpo ====
One of the first artworks using cell phone: MMS, SMS, email and digital photograph - Biennale de Venezia 2005.

==== wyfy® ====
Video and performance - Biennale de Lyon 2007, FRUC.

==== Le Nouveau Voyage ====
110 years after his ancestor's epic journey, Stéphan Barron takes the same route as seen by satellite. This work is presented as a performance-projection but can also be experienced more personally with mobile phone and the internet. Le FRUC - April 2009.

==== o-o-o ====
Live performance and sound installation transforms in real time using singing voices measures of ozone from the GOME satellite spinning around earth and measures of ozone produced by city pollution in the exhibition center. Le FRUC - 2008.

==== Contact ====
Two seemingly unconnected copper plates in two different locations. When someone places a hand on the first plate, the second will begin to warm up. FRUC & ECAP congress 2008.

==== Monochromes ====
Monochromes draw the viewers into a pure perception of colour without the presence of a physical art work. One experiences the depth of pure colour - the colour within. 2012.

==== Thermochromes ====
The thermochromes are hand imprints created with paint that disappears at human body temperature. They follow Stéphan Barron's installation contact.

==== 3Dedalus ====
3D print sculpture of a Daedalean labyrinth. This cubic labyrinth is formed by stacking 25 QR codes tracing the path of Leopold Bloom, hero of James Joyce's Ulysses through the streets of Dublin. 2014.

=== Photography ===
==== Prières ====
Installation of 14 digital photograph sized 120x160 in FRUC Artcenter, Montpellier - July 2003

=== Video Art ===
==== Baltic ====
Videotape (18 min) + Sound of the stones and clash of primitive materials: earth, straw, grass and sky. Key words: Carnac, Zen garden, land-art, ready-made. Music: Deficit Des Années Anterieures - 1985

==== New York ====
Videotape (4 min 30 sec) + New York, machine, mechanical constraints with muffled sounds. New York, energy, foaming and perpetual movement. New York, black and white mixing - Music: Vivenza -1985 -1986

==== Orient express ====
Video performance-installation - 1987, Paris/Budapest. Shown in Stockholm in 1988

==== Wall ====
Video environment made of 4 walls of 4 times 4 TV monitors. On the videos: close-up views of city walls. Meditation, concentration, expansion - 1987. Shown in Vidéoformes 04/87 Clermont-Ferrand, Opéra de Lille 09/87, Sigma de Bordeaux 11/87, Vidéo Art Plastique d’Hérouville 11/87, CAC de St Quentin en Yvelynes 01/88

==== C'est d'autres tiroirs ====
Installation at Centre Culturel de Cherbourg - 1988

==== Nine 2 Five ====
Video Installation vidéo - Caen and Vire - Octobre 1987/Mai 1988

==== Dans la chaleur des concept ====
Stephan Barron puts a TV set showing fire in the middle of the Icking forest near Munich. Fire symbolizes the domination of man over nature (a reference to Prometheus) and the possible danger of technology for man's survival - 1988.

==== Signs of the times ====
Seven pieces of blue novelatto marble measuring 0.7 x 1 m engraved with the principal symbols of video - 1993

==== In the space of a day ====
Video process and installation about the space we go through in a day. - 1994

==== Thaon / New York ====
Video on the 1987 satellite transmission - 1990

==== Dans la chaleur des concepts ====
Video on the 1988 installation - 1990

==== Traits ====
Video on the artwork from 1989 - Voice from Pierre Restany - 1990

==== Hommage au «Chaos» ====
Video - 1993

==== Les plantes de mon jardin ====
Video on the project - 1994

==== Transmission ====
This video is made with the images of the slow-scan transmission Thaon / New York edited on the original sound transmission by the radio WNYC New York. The film is a succession of slow meditative images. These almost abstract images are like many black and white paintings slowly revealed. This film is an hypnotic artwork. - 2008

==== A perte d'entendre ====
Linked by walkie-talkie to the Brandenburg Gate, Stéphan Barron walked away from it 8 successive times in 8 different directions. Each time he lost audio contact, he there and then took a Polaroid picture. The video is made with the 8 images and the sound from 91 - 2008

==== Le Nouveau Voyage ====
Video on the planetary artwork «Le Nouveau Voyage» - 2009

==== Dvdremix ====
Limited Edition of historical and new remixed video artwork by Stéphan Barron starting 2010 .
