= Gordon H. Chang =

American historian

- Born: 1948 (age 77–78); British Hong Kong

Academic background
- Education: Princeton University (BA); Stanford University (PhD)

Gordon Hsiao-shu Chang (simplified Chinese: 张少书; traditional Chinese: 張少書; pinyin: Zhāng Shàoshū; born 1948) is a Hong Kong-born American historian and writer in the United States. He is a professor and vice provost at Stanford University.

== Early life and education ==
Born in British Hong Kong, Chang earned a degree in history from Princeton and his PhD in history from Stanford.

== Career ==
In 1991, Chang joined Stanford University. Chang is the Olive H. Palmer Professor in the Humanities and a professor of American history at Stanford University. Chang's academic interests lie in the connection between race and ethnicity in America and American foreign relations. Chang has written on Asian-American history and US–East Asian interactions, and he also researches the fields of US diplomacy, the US-Soviet Cold War, modern China and international security.

In 1990, Chang published his first book Friends and Enemies: The United States, China and the Soviet Union, 1948–1972. In 1997, Chang's second book was Morning Glory, Evening Shadow: Yamato Ichihashi and His Wartime Writing, 1942–1945, about a Japanese American history professor at Stanford University who was interned during the war. Chang's other books include Asian Americans and Politics: An Exploration (2001), Chinese American Voices: From the Gold Rush to the Present (2006), Asian American Art: A History, 1850–1970 (2008), Fateful Ties: A History of America's Preoccupation with China (2015), Ghosts of Gold Mountain: The Epic Story of the Chinese Who Built the Transcontinental Railroad (2019), The Chinese and the Iron Road Building the Transcontinental Railroad (2019), and War, Race, and Culture: Journeys in Trans-Pacific and Asian American Histories (2025).

In 2015, Chang was inducted as a member of Committee of 100, a leadership organization of Chinese Americans in business, government, academia and the arts whose stated aim is "to encourage constructive relations between the peoples of the United States and Greater China."

In 2019, Chang became a senior associate vice provost for undergraduate education at Stanford University.

In 2024, Chang co-founded the Asian American Research Center at Stanford (AARCS) with Stephen Sano and Jeanne Tsai and became the center's inaugural director.

In 2024, Chang was inducted as a member of the American Academy of Arts & Sciences.

== Works ==
- 1990 Friends and Enemies: The United States, China, and Soviet Union, 1948–1972.
- 2019 Ghosts of Gold Mountain: The Epic Stories of the Chinese Who Built the Transcontinental Railroad.

== Awards ==
- 1987 Louis Pelzer Memorial Award (Organization of American Historians).
- 1991 Stuart L. Bernath Book Prize Bernath Book Prize (Society for Historians of American Foreign Relations).
- 1999 Guggenheim Fellowship Award.

== See also ==
- Committee of 100
- List of Guggenheim Fellowships awarded in 1999
- Yuji Ichioka

== Sources ==
- "US–China media brief". University of California, Los Angeles, Asian-American Center. 2009.
