= Jacqueline Carey (novelist, born 1954) =

American novelist and short story writer

- Born: 1954 (age 71–72); Cambridge, Massachusetts, U.S.
- Education: Swarthmore College
- Occupations: Novelist, story writer
- Spouse: Ian Frazier
- Children: 2
- Writing career
- Years active: 1986–present
- Website: therealjacquelinecarey.com

Jacqueline Carey (born 1954 in Cambridge, Massachusetts) is an American novelist and short story writer. Carey grew up in Connecticut and graduated from Swarthmore College in 1977. She lived in New York City for many years but published her first story in The New Yorker in 1986 after a move to Montana. In 2000, she wrote a mystery column for Salon.com. She now lives in New Jersey, with her husband, writer Ian Frazier.

Carey won a Guggenheim Fellowship in 1999 to write The Crossley Baby.

== Books ==
- Good Gossip (short stories, 1992)
- The Other Family (novel, 1996)
- Wedding Pictures (illustrated book, pictures by Kathy Osborn, 1997)
- The Crossley Baby (novel, 2002)
- It's A Crime (novel, 2008)
