= Teresa Toledo =

Cuban film scholar (born 1946)

- Born: 1946 (age 79–80); Havana, Cuba
- Occupation: Historian
- Awards: Guggenheim Fellowship (1999)

Academic background
- Education: School of Dramatic Arts; Alliance française; University of Havana

Academic work
- Sub-discipline: Latin American film
- Institutions: Instituto Cubano del Arte e Industria Cinematográficos

Teresa Toledo Cabrera (born 1946) is a Cuban film scholar. She worked for decades at the Instituto Cubano del Arte e Industria Cinematográficos before moving to Spain due to the Special Period recession. She has written or edited four books and is a 1999 Guggenheim Fellow.

== Biography ==
Teresa Toledo Cabrera was born in 1946 in Havana. (Note: Sources differ; the Enciclopedia Digital del Audiovisual Cubano says she was born on 5 February, while the John Simon Guggenheim Memorial Foundation says 2 May.) She was educated at the School of Dramatic Arts and an Alliance française. She later studied history at the University of Havana, where she obtained her licentiate in 1977.

In 1963, Toledo joined the Instituto Cubano del Arte e Industria Cinematográficos, working as an archivist and as the principal specialist for the Latin American film section, which she herself started. She also started chairing the Cuban Film Center's documentation center in 1978. She left Cuba due to the country's economic crisis in the Special Period, and permanently settled in Madrid in July 1996. Moving to Spain, she became a researcher at the Filmoteca Española, as well as a programmer at the Casa de América.

Toledo studies Latin American cinema. She is author of 10 años del nuevo cine latinoamericano (1990) In 1999, she was awarded a Guggenheim Fellowship to work on a dictionary of Latin American film directors. In collaboration with the San Sebastián International Film Festival, she was editor of Utopías y realidades: el cine latinoamericano de los noventa (2001), Construyendo el cine (latinoamericano) (2002), and Imágenes en libertad (2003). She and Argentine filmmaker Nicolás Saad co-edited Miradas: el cine argentino de los noventa, published by the Spanish Agency for International Cooperation in 2000.
