= Andrea Belag =

American painter (born 1951)

- Born: 1951 (age 74–75); New York City, US
- Education: New York Studio School of Drawing, Painting and Sculpture
- Known for: Contemporary Abstract Paintings
- Notable work: Brooklyn Transitions; MTA Arts & Design
- Awards: John Simon Guggenheim Memorial Foundation Fellowship

Andrea Belag is a contemporary abstract painter. Belag studied the New York Studio School of Drawing, Painting and Sculpture after attending Boston University and Bard College. She was a Faculty Member at the School of Visual Arts, in New York from 1995 to 2021.

Belag creates abstract artworks that are influenced by Zen gardens, nature, and contemporary art. In 2017, she completed Brooklyn Transitions, a commission located at Avenue U in Brooklyn for the MTA Arts & Design. 30 permanent glass artworks were installed on both the northbound and southbound platforms. Belag was awarded a commission by the New York Cultural Council to do a site-specific art installation for Fire Station EC268 LC137 in Far Rockaway, Queens for 2026.

== Biography ==
Belag was born in Manhattan. She attended New York Studio of Drawing, Painting & Sculpture after attending Boston University and Bard College. She taught painting and drawing at School of Visual Arts, Princeton University, State University at Purchase, and the Maryland Institute College of Art.

She curated exhibitions for the Jersey City Art Museum, Kansas City Art Institute, Morgan Lehman Gallery, as well as co-curating The Feminine in Abstract Painting at The Milton Resnick & Pat Passlof Foundation.

== Work ==
Belag is known for her abstract oil paintings and works on paper that have emotional impact through color, light, performative gesture and spatial complexity.

Belag's work has been exhibited in Pera Museum, Istanbul, Turkey; Mead Museum, Amherst; Newark Museum, NJ; New Jersey State Museum, NJ; Heinz Holtmann, Cologne, Germany; Sprengel Museum, Hanover, Germany and Jeddah Collection, United States Embassy, Saudi Arabia.

Julian Kreimer stated, "In Belag's work, that rightness comes in the form of Beauty with a capital B, beauty in the capacious sense of possessing a profound sense of authenticity that comes from something that feels legitimate to the artist who made it first, and transmitting that profound sense of order and connection, mysteriously, to the viewer."

In 2023, Belag spoke to Paul Laster of Whitehot Magazine of Contemporary Art and commented, "I love transparency and the touch of materials, so I have created a way of painting where I make this possible. I use mostly transparent pigments and fine linen, and I paint wet into wet. The marks are on one layer of the painted surface with very little overlap or pentimento. Color makes space and light come through the paint and emotion comes through as well. There is fear and desire in painting, and that's addictive."

== Collections ==
- Art in Embassies, United States Embassy, Jeddah, Saudi Arabia
- Hudson Valley Center for Contemporary Art, Jewish Museum, New York
- Newark Museum, New Jersey
- New Jersey State Museum, Trenton, New Jersey
- Morris Museum of Arts and Sciences, Morristown, New Jersey
- Mead Museum, Amherst College, Amherst, Massachusetts
- Sprengel Museum, Hanover, Germany

== Selected solo exhibitions ==
- SHFAP, Ghostwriter, New York, New York (2016)
- Phillip Slein, Beachcomber, St. Louis, MO (2018)
- Morgan Lehman Gallery, Inheritance, New York City (2020)
- Bienvenu Steinberg & J, Currents, New York City (2023)
- New Collectors Gallery, NY., "Under the Pergola", 2022

== Awards and honors ==
- 1984 – NJ State Council of the Arts Fellowship
- 1987 – National Endowment for the Arts Fellowship
- 1999 – Guggenheim Foundation Fellowship
- 2002, 2001, & 1994 – Yaddo Residency
- 2003 – Rockefeller Foundation Residency in Bellagio, Italy
- 2022 – Purchase Prize, American Academy of Arts and Letters
