= Electronic Café International =

Performance space in Santa Monica, California, USA

Coordinates: 34.023893°N 118.477713°W

Electronic Café International (ECI), established in 1988 by Kit Galloway and Sherrie Rabinowitz, is a performance space and real café housed in the 18th Street Arts Center in Santa Monica, California.

== Creation ==
The couple had realized after their experience with Electronic Café '84 that the next logical step was to establish a continuous venue for telepresence media events. For the next 10 years, the ECI lab was the site of electronic networking instigations that contributed significantly to the canon of collaborative telecommunications arts. Phrases and terms such as 'interactive dramaturgy,' 'metadesign environments,' 'telephone opera,' 'teleconcert,' 'tele-immersive,' 'telepresent' and 'telepresence' emerged during 1989 to 2000, as the participating artists, their critics, reviewers and theorists about their work attempted to describe and define the phenomena being created in the globally networked environment of Electronic Café International. ECI's broad-ranging programs included works such as localized celebrations of New Year's Eve or Earth Day expanded to global scale and extended 24 hours, when Electronic Café International and its affiliates in Europe, Asia, South America and Australia shared their celebrations with affiliated ECI patrons across the ECI network. New music was composed for networked performance by composers such as Mark Coniglio, Max Mathews, Pauline Oliveros, David Rosenboom, and Morton Subotnick. At ECI, poets, dancers, and dramatic performance artists explored the attributes of telepresence.

Since ECI opened in 1989, imitations of Galloway and Rabinowitz's concept of Electronic Café International have proliferated all over the planet.
