= Andrew G. Ewing =

American chemist

Andrew Graham Ewing (born 19 January 1957) is an American chemist.

== Education ==
Ewing obtained a degree in chemistry from St. Lawrence University in 1979, and a doctorate in the subject at Indiana University Bloomington in 1983. He joined the Pennsylvania State University faculty in 1984, and held the J. Lloyd Huck Chair in Natural Sciences from 1999 until 2010. He held the named professorship until 2010, when he moved to Sweden to continue his teaching career at Göteborg.

== Honors and awards ==
In 2007, he was awarded a Marie Curie Chair at the University of Gothenburg.

While in the USA, Ewing was awarded the following honours.

- NSF Presidential Young Investigator Award (1987),
- Alfred P. Sloan Research Fellowship (1989),
- Camille and Henry Dreyfus Teacher-Scholar Award (1989),
- The Penn State Faculty Scholar Medal in Physical Sciences and Engineering (1994),
- The Penn State Graduate Faculty Teaching Award (1997),
- The John Simon Guggenheim Memorial Foundation Fellow¬ship (1999),
- Award for Outstanding Achievements in the Field of Capillary Electrophoresis (1999),
- A. A. Benedetti-Pichler Award, American Microchemical Society (2000),
- Distinguished Alumni Citation, Saint Lawrence University (2001),
- Special Creativity Extension, National Science Foundation (2001–02),
- Elected Fellow of American Association for Advancement of Science (2004),
- Eastern Analytical Symposium Award for Outstanding Achievements in the Fields of Analytical Chemistry (2006),
- American Chemical Society Analytical Division Award for Chemical Instrumentation (2006),

Since coming to Sweden, he has been awarded the following honours.

- European Union Marie Curie Chair (2007-2010),
- Fellow, Royal Society of Chemistry, FRSC (2009),
- European Research Council (ERC) Advanced Grant (2011),
- Appointed Wallenberg Scholar (2011),
- Elected to Swedish Academy of Sciences (Academician), Chemistry Class, (2012),
- Charles N Reilley Award in Electroanalytical Chemistry (2013),
- American Chemical Society Analytical Division Award in Electrochemistry (2013),
- Elected to the Gothenburg Academy of Arts and Sciences (2013),
- Honorary Professor, Nanjing University of Science and Technology (2014-2019),
- Norblad-Ekstrand Medal of the Swedish Chemical Society (2014),
- Honorary Professor, University of Science and Technology Beijing (2014),
- Society for Analytical Chemists of Pittsburgh Award in Analytical Chemistry (2015),
- International Association of Advanced Materials European Advanced Materials Award (2017),
- Appointed Wallenberg Scholar, 2nd (2017),
- European Research Council (ERC) Advanced Grant (2018),
- Ralph N Adams Award in Bioanalytical Chemistry (2021),

== Career and research ==
Andrew Ewing is currently Professor of Chemistry and Molecular Biology at the University of Gothenburg, Sweden. He is a Knut and Alice Wallenberg Scholar (2011-2023), an elected member of the Royal Swedish Academy of Sciences, class 4 (chemistry), Nobel Class (2012) and the Gothenburg Academy of Arts and Sciences (2013).

His research focusses on the neuronal process of exocytosis pioneering small-volume chemical measurements at single nerve cells and the contents of individual nanometer vesicles in cells as well as mass spectrometry imaging of cells and organelles. He has collaborated to train 57 PhD students and 30 postdocs and currently has 7 of each in his research group with 4 MS students. With approximately 380 publications, he has an H index of 86 and his works have been cited over 24000 times

During the pandemic he has focussed on advocacy for limiting the spread of COVID-19 owing to the effects on mortality and health. He is a member of the World Health Network Experts and Advisors team. He specialises in following and interpreting the wealth of literature on the short- and long-term effects of covid on the brain and what this means for the future of humanity.

Ewing has given many talks on both his laboratory research and on covid effects on the brain.
