= New media art =

Artworks designed and produced by means of electronic media technologies

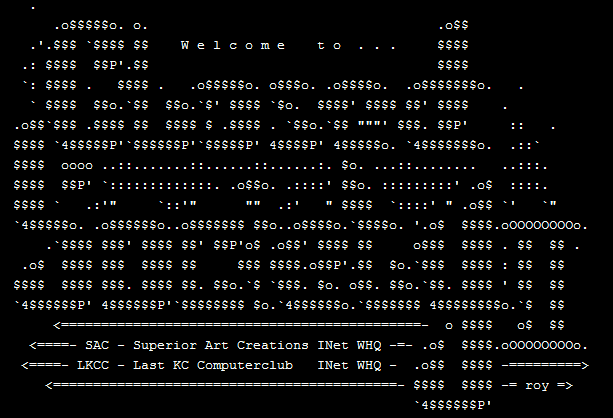
Newskool ASCII Screenshot with the words “Closed Society II”

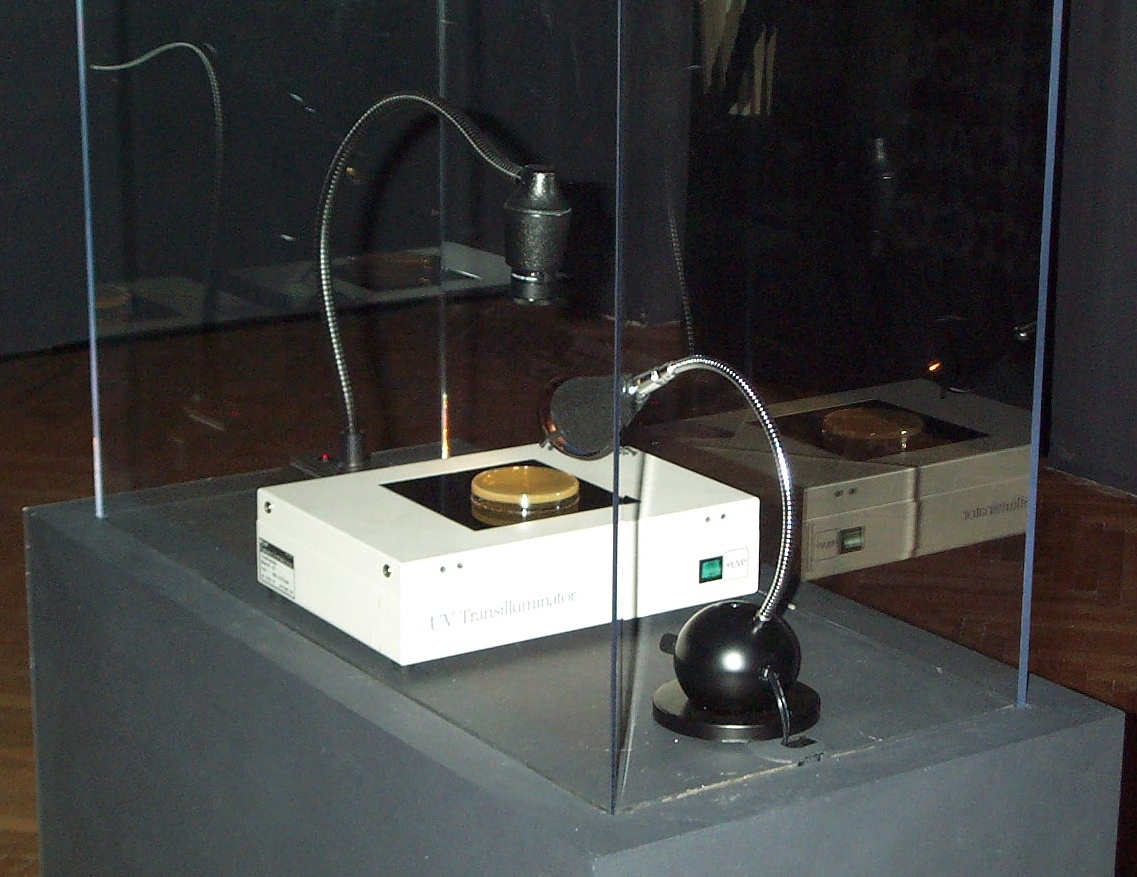
Eduardo Kac's installation "Genesis" Ars Electronica 1999

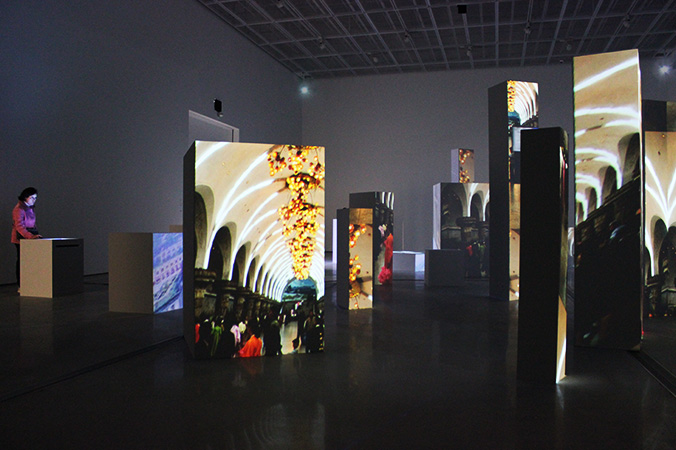
10.000 moving cities, Marc Lee, 2013, National Museum of Modern and Contemporary Art Seoul, Korea

New media art includes artworks designed and produced by means of electronic media technologies. It comprises virtual art, computer graphics, computer animation, digital art, interactive art, sound art, Internet art, video games, robotics, 3D printing, immersive installation and cyborg art. The term defines itself by the thereby created artwork, which differentiates itself from that deriving from conventional visual arts such as architecture, painting or sculpture.

New media art has origins in the worlds of science, art, and performance. Some common themes found in new media art include databases, political and social activism, Afrofuturism, feminism, and identity. The incorporation of new technology into the work is another recurring feature. The emphasis on medium is a defining feature of much contemporary art, and many art schools and major universities now offer majors in "New Genres" or "New Media", while a growing number of graduate programs have emerged internationally.

New media art may involve degrees of interaction between artwork and observer or between the artist and the public, as is the case in performance art. Several theorists and curators have noted that such forms of interaction do not distinguish new media art but rather serve as a common ground that has parallels in other strands of contemporary art practice. Such insights emphasize the forms of cultural practice that arise concurrently with emerging technological platforms, and question the focus on technological media per se. New media art involves complex curation and preservation practices that make collecting, installing, and exhibiting the works harder than most other mediums. Many cultural centers and museums have been established to cater to the advanced needs of new media art.

== History ==
The origins of new media art can be traced to the moving image inventions of the 19th century such as the phenakistiscope (1833), the praxinoscope (1877) and Eadweard Muybridge's zoopraxiscope (1879). From the 1900s through the 1960s, various forms of kinetic and light art, from Thomas Wilfred's 'Lumia' (1919) and 'Clavilux' light organs to Jean Tinguely's self-destructing sculpture Homage to New York (1960) can be seen as progenitors of new media art.

Steve Dixon in his book Digital Performance: New Technologies in Theatre, Dance and Performance Art argues that the early twentieth century avant-garde art movement Futurism was the birthplace of the merging of technology and performance art. Some early examples of performance artists who experimented with then state-of-the-art lighting, film, and projection include dancers Loïe Fuller and Valentine de Saint-Point. Cartoonist Winsor McCay performed in sync with an animated Gertie the Dinosaur on tour in 1914. By the 1920s many Cabaret acts began incorporating film projection into performances.

Robert Rauschenberg's piece Broadcast (1959), composed of three interactive re-tunable radios and a painting, is considered one of the first examples of interactive art. German artist Wolf Vostell experimented with television sets in his (1958) installation TV De-collages. Vostell's work influenced Nam June Paik, who created sculptural installations featuring hundreds of television sets that displayed distorted and abstract footage.

Beginning in Chicago during the 1970s, there was a surge of artists experimenting with video art and combining recent computer technology with their traditional mediums, including sculpture, photography, and graphic design. Many of the artists involved were grad students at The School of the Art Institute of Chicago, including Kate Horsfield and Lyn Blumenthal, who co-founded the Video Data Bank in 1976. Another artists involved was Donna Cox, she collaborated with mathematician George Francis and computer scientist Ray Idaszak on the project Venus in Time which depicted mathematical data as 3D digital sculptures named for their similarities to Paleolithic Venus statues. In 1982 artist Ellen Sandor and her team called (art)n Laboratory created the medium called PHSCologram, which stands for photography, holography, sculpture, and computer graphics. Her visualization of the AIDS virus was depicted on the cover of IEEE Computer Graphics and Applications in November 1988. At the University of Illinois in 1989, members of the Electronic Visualization Laboratory Carolina Cruz-Neira, Thomas DeFanti, and Daniel J. Sandin collaborated to create what is known as CAVE or Cave Automatic Virtual Environment an early virtual reality immersion using rear projection.

In 1983, Roy Ascott introduced the concept of "distributed authorship" in his worldwide telematic project La Plissure du Texte for Frank Popper's "Electra" at the Musée d'Art Moderne de la Ville de Paris. The development of computer graphics at the end of the 1980s and real time technologies in the 1990s combined with the spreading of the Web and the Internet favored the emergence of new and various forms of interactive art by Ken Feingold, Lynn Hershman Leeson, David Rokeby, Ken Rinaldo, Perry Hoberman, Tamas Waliczky; telematic art by Roy Ascott, Paul Sermon, Michael Bielický; Internet art by Vuk Ćosić, Jodi; virtual and immersive art by Jeffrey Shaw, Maurice Benayoun, Monika Fleischmann, and large scale urban installation by Rafael Lozano-Hemmer. In Geneva, the Centre pour l'Image Contemporaine or CIC coproduced with Centre Georges Pompidou from Paris and the Museum Ludwig in Cologne the first internet video archive of new media art.

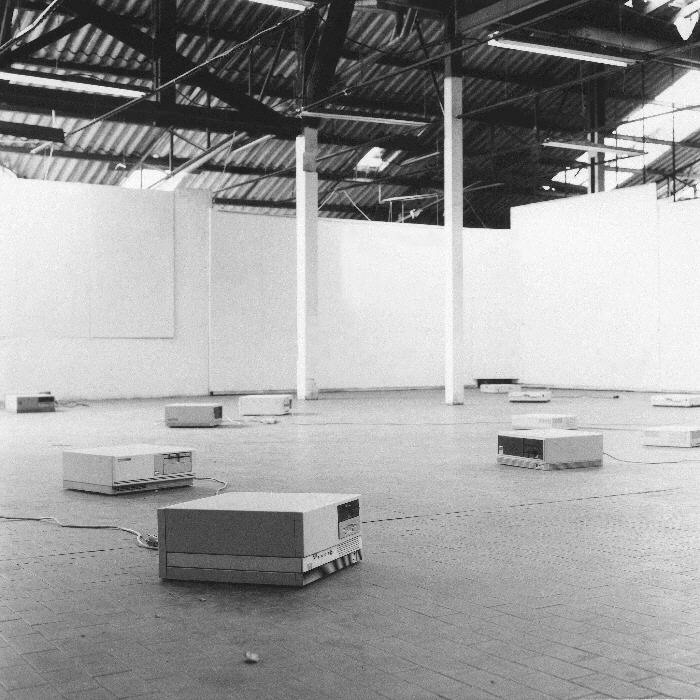
Maurizio Bolognini, Sealed Computers (Nice, France, 1992–1998). This installation uses computer codes to create endless flows of random images that nobody would see. (Images are continuously generated but they are prevented from becoming a physical artwork).

Simultaneously advances in biotechnology have also allowed artists like Eduardo Kac to begin exploring DNA and genetics as a new art medium.

Influences on new media art have been the theories developed around interaction, hypertext, databases, and networks. Important thinkers in this regard have been Vannevar Bush and Theodor Nelson, whereas comparable ideas can be found in the literary works of Jorge Luis Borges, Italo Calvino, and Julio Cortázar.

== Themes ==
In the book New Media Art, Mark Tribe and Reena Jana named several themes that contemporary new media art addresses, including computer art, collaboration, identity, appropriation, open sourcing, telepresence, surveillance, corporate parody, as well as intervention and hacktivism. In the book Postdigitale, Maurizio Bolognini suggested that new media artists have one common denominator, which is a self-referential relationship with the new technologies, the result of finding oneself inside an epoch-making transformation determined by technological development.

New media art does not appear as a set of homogeneous practices, but as a complex field converging around three main elements: 1) the art system, 2) scientific and industrial research, and 3) political-cultural media activism. There are significant differences between scientist-artists, activist-artists and technological artists closer to the art system, who not only have different training and technocultures, but have different artistic production. This should be taken into account in examining the several themes addressed by new media art.

Non-linearity can be seen as an important topic to new media art by artists developing interactive, generative, collaborative, immersive artworks like Jeffrey Shaw or Maurice Benayoun who explored the term as an approach to looking at varying forms of digital projects where the content relies on the user's experience. This is a key concept since people acquired the notion that they were conditioned to view everything in a linear and clear-cut fashion. Now, art is stepping out of that form and allowing for people to build their own experiences with the piece. Non-linearity describes a project that escape from the conventional linear narrative coming from novels, theater plays and movies. Non-linear art usually requires audience participation or at least, the fact that the "visitor" is taken into consideration by the representation, altering the displayed content. The participatory aspect of new media art, which for some artists has become integral, emerged from Allan Kaprow's Happenings and became with Internet, a significant component of contemporary art.

Ideological struggle between corporates, government bodies and public interest and development of the inter-connectivity and interactivity of the internet, shaped the modern web and significantly inspired the emergence of new media art.

=== Databases ===
One of the key themes in new media art is to create visual views of databases. Pioneers in this area include Lisa Strausfeld, Martin Wattenberg and Alberto Frigo. From 2004 to 2014 George Legrady's piece "Making Visible the Invisible" displayed the normally unseen library metadata of items recently checked out at the Seattle Public Library on six LCD monitors behind the circulation desk. Database aesthetics holds at least two attractions to new media artists: formally, as a new variation on non-linear narratives; and politically as a means to subvert what is fast becoming a form of control and authority.

=== Political and social activism ===
Many new media art projects also work with themes like politics and social consciousness, allowing for social activism through the interactive nature of the media. New media art includes "explorations of code and user interface; interrogations of archives, databases, and networks; production via automated scraping, filtering, cloning, and recombinatory techniques; applications of user-generated content (UGC) layers; crowdsourcing ideas on social- media platforms; narrowcasting digital selves on "free" websites that claim copyright; and provocative performances that implicate audiences as participants".

=== Afrofuturism ===
Afrofuturism is an interdisciplinary genre that explores the African diaspora experience, predominantly in the United States, by deconstructing the past and imagining the future through the themes of technology, science fiction, and fantasy. Musician Sun Ra, believed to be one of the founders of Afrofuturism, thought a blend of technology and music could help humanity overcome the ills of society. His band, The Sun Ra Arkestra, combined traditional Jazz with sound and performance art and were among the first musicians to perform with a synthesizer. The twenty-first century has seen a resurgence of Afrofuturism aesthetics and themes with artists and cooperation's like Jessi Jumanji and Black Quantum Futurism and art educational centers like Black Space in Durham, North Carolina.

=== Feminism and the female experience ===
Japanese artist Mariko Mori's multimedia installation piece Wave UFO (1999–2003) sought to examine the science and perceptions behind the study of consciousness and neuroscience. Exploring the ways that these fields undertake research in a materially reductionist manner. Mori's work emphasized the need for these fields to become more holistic and incorporate insights and understanding of the world from philosophy and the humanities. Swiss artist Pipilotti Rist's (2008) immersive video installation Pour Your Body Out explores the dichotomy of beauty and the grotesque in the natural world and their relation to the female experience. The large-scale 360-degree installation featured breast-shaped projectors and circular pink pillows that invited viewers to relax and immerse themselves in the vibrant colors, psychedelic music, and partake in meditation and yoga. American filmmaker and artist Lynn Hershman Leeson explores in her films the themes of identity, technology and the erasure of women's roles and contributions to technology. Her (1999) film Conceiving Ada depicts a computer scientist and new media artist named Emmy as she attempts and succeeds at creating a way to communicate through cyberspace with Ada Lovelace, an Englishwoman who created the first computer program in the 1840s via a form of artificial intelligence.

=== Identity ===
With its roots in outsider art, New Media has been an ideal medium for an artist to explore the topics of identity and representation. In Canada, Indigenous multidisciplinary artists like Cheryl L'Hirondelle and Kent Monkman have incorporated themes about gender, identity, activism, and colonization in their work. Monkman, a Cree artist, performs and appears as their alter ego Miss Chief Eagle Testickle, in film, photography, painting, installation, and performance art. Monkman describes Miss Chief as a representation of a two-spirit or non-binary persona that does not fall under the traditional description of drag.

== Future of new media art ==
The emergence of 3D printing has introduced a new bridge to new media art, joining the virtual and the physical worlds. The rise of this technology has allowed artists to blend the computational base of new media art with the traditional physical form of sculpture. A pioneer in this field was artist Jonty Hurwitz who created the first known anamorphosis sculpture using this technique.

== Longevity ==
As the technologies used to deliver works of new media art such as film, tapes, web browsers, software and operating systems become obsolete, New Media art faces serious issues around the challenge to preserve artwork beyond the time of its contemporary production. Currently, research projects into New media art preservation are underway to improve the preservation and documentation of the fragile media arts heritage (see DOCAM – Documentation and Conservation of the Media Arts Heritage).

Methods of preservation exist, including the translation of a work from an obsolete medium into a related new medium, the digital archiving of media (see the Rhizome ArtBase, which holds over 2000 works, and the Internet Archive), and the use of emulators to preserve work dependent on obsolete software or operating system environments.

Around the mid-90s, the issue of storing works in digital form became a concern. Digital art such as moving images, multimedia, interactive programs, and computer-generated art has different properties than physical artwork such as oil paintings and sculptures. Unlike analog technologies, a digital file can be recopied onto a new medium without any deterioration of content. One of the problems with preserving digital art is that the formats continuously change over time. Former examples of transitions include that from 8-inch floppy disks to 5.25-inch floppies, 3-inch diskettes to CD-ROMs, and DVDs to flash drives. On the horizon is the obsolescence of flash drives and portable hard drives, as data is increasingly held in online cloud storage.

Museums and galleries thrive off of being able to accommodate the presentation and preservation of physical artwork. New media art challenges the original methods of the art world when it comes to documentation, its approach to collection and preservation. Technology continues to advance, and the nature and structure of art organizations and institutions will remain in jeopardy. The traditional roles of curators and artist are continually changing, and a shift to new collaborative models of production and presentation is needed.

=== Preservation ===
See also Conservation and restoration of new media art

New media art encompasses various mediums all which require their own preservation approaches. Due to the vast technical aspects involved no established digital preservation guidelines fully encompass the spectrum of new media art. New media art falls under the category of "complex digital object" in the Digital Curation Centre's digital curation lifecycle model which involves specialized or totally unique preservation techniques. Complex digital objects preservation has an emphasis on the inherent connection of the components of the piece.

== Education ==
In New Media programs, students are able to get acquainted with the new forms of creation and communication. New Media students learn to identify what is or isn't "new" about certain technologies. Science and the market will present new tools and platforms for artists and designers. Students learn how to sort through new technological platforms and place them in a larger context of sensation, communication, production, and consumption.

When obtaining a bachelor's degree in New Media, students will primarily work through practice of building experiences that utilize new and old technologies and narrative. Through the construction of projects in various media, they acquire technical skills, practice vocabularies of critique and analysis, and gain familiarity with historical and contemporary precedents.

In the United States, many Bachelor's and Master's level programs exist with concentrations on Media Art, New Media, Media Design, Digital Media and Interactive Arts.

== Theorists and historians ==
Notable art theorists and historians working in this field include:

- Roy Ascott
- Maurice Benayoun
- Christine Buci-Glucksmann
- Jack Burnham
- Mario Costa
- Edmond Couchot
- Fred Forest
- Oliver Grau
- Margot Lovejoy
- Lev Manovich
- Robert C. Morgan
- Dominique Moulon
- Christiane Paul
- Catherine Perret
- Frank Popper
- Edward A. Shanken

== Types ==
The term New Media Art is generally applied to disciplines such as:

- Artistic computer game modification
- ASCII art
- Bio Art
- Cyberformance
- Computer art
- Critical making
- Digital art
- Demoscene
- Digital poetry
- Electronic art
- Experimental musical instrument building
- Evolutionary art
- Fax art
- Generative art
- Glitch art
- Hypertext
- Information art
- Interactive art
- Kinetic art
- Light art
- Motion graphics
- Net art
- Performance art
- Radio art
- Robotic art
- Screenlife
- Software art
- Sound art
- Systems art
- Telematic art
- Video art
- Video games
- Virtual art

== Cultural centres ==
- Australian Network for Art and Technology
- Center for Art and Media Karlsruhe
- Centre pour l'Image Contemporaine
- Daniel Langlois Foundation
- Eyebeam Art and Technology Center
- FACT Liverpool
- Foundation for Art and Creative Technology
- Gray Area Foundation for the Arts
- Harvestworks
- InterAccess
- Los Angeles Center for Digital Art (LACDA)
- Netherlands Media Art Institute
- NTT InterCommunication Center
- Rhizome (organization)
- RIXC
- School for Poetic Computation (SFPC)
- School of the Art Institute of Chicago
- Squeaky Wheel: Film and Media Arts Center
- V2 Institute for the Unstable Media
- WORM

== See also ==
- ART/MEDIA
- Artmedia
- Aspect magazine
- Culture jamming
- Digital media
- Digital puppetry
- Electronic Language International Festival
- Electronic literature
- Expanded Cinema
- Experiments in Art and Technology
- Interactive film
- Interactive media
- Intermedia
- LA Freewaves
- Net.art
- New media art festivals
- New media artist
- New media art journals
- New media art preservation
- Remix culture
- VJing
