= Artmedia =

Scientific project concerning media

Artmedia was one of the first scientific projects concerning the relationship between art, technology, philosophy and aesthetics. It was founded in 1985 at the University of Salerno. For over two decades, until 2009, dozens of projects, studies, exhibitions and conferences on new technologies made Artmedia a reference point for many internationally renowned scholars and artists, and contributed to the growing cultural interest in the aesthetics of media, the aesthetics of networks, and their ethical and anthropological implications.

== Beginnings and international events ==
Since the late 1970s, a permanent Seminar of the Aesthetics of Media and Communication has been directed by its founder Mario Costa at the University of Salerno. The basic principles of the aesthetics of technological communication were identified and conceptualized in 1983. A conference on "Technological Imaginary", held in 1984 at the Museo del Sannio in Benevento, discussed the issue of the new relationship between art and technology and the consequent need to re-evaluate aesthetics, warning that "all our future existence will be played at the crossroads between technology and imagination".

The comprehensive relationship between art and technoscience, technology, and philosophy has also been the theoretical subject of the ten international "Artmedia" conferences which were held in Salerno and Paris between 1985 and 2008. Particularly relevant were conferences held in Paris between 2002 and 2008, which took place at the Ecole Normale Supérieure, the Bibliotheque Nationale de France (BNF) and the Institut National d'Histoire de l 'Art (INHA), with the partnership of the Société Française d'Esthétique, the Université du Québec à Montréal, the University of Toronto, the Universidade de São Paulo, the Université de Paris 1 Sorbonne, and the U.S. magazine Leonardo.

== Continuous debate between artists and theorists ==
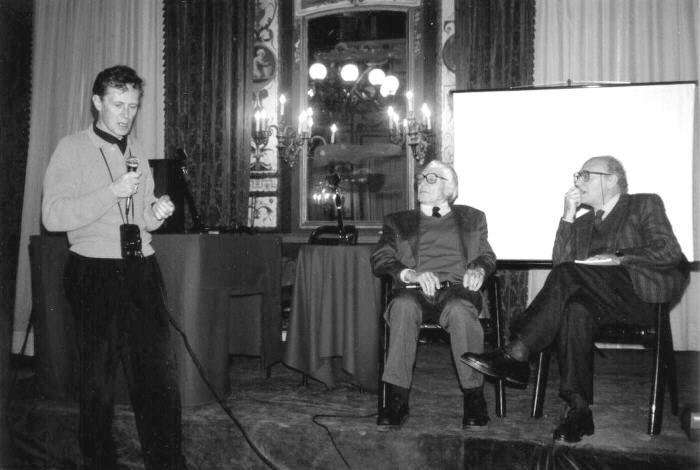
Derrick de Kerckhove, René Berger and Mario Costa, Artmedia IV (1992)

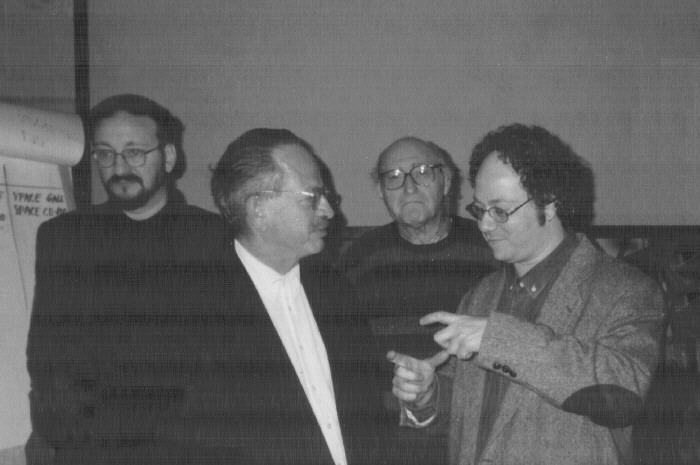
Maurizio Bolognini, Richard Kriesche, Mario Costa and Eduardo Kac, Artmedia VII (1999)

Artmedia wanted to gather theorists and artists from all over the world and encourage both joint and complementary work, beginning with the need to give attention to theoretical and artistic practices and developing both together. These also contributed towards spreading the spirit of the project, both in a number of festivals and shows, and through their own artworks and research.

Theorists who worked with Artmedia and participated in its activities included Bernard Stiegler, René Berger, Abraham Moles, Derrick De Kerckhove, Pierre Levy, Gillo Dorfles, Paul Virilio, Frank Popper, Roger Malina, Daniel Charles, José Jiménez, Anne Cauquelin, Edgar Morin, Thierry de Duve, Catherine Millet, Filiberto Menna, Andreas Broeckmann, Rudolf zur Lippe, Edmond Couchot, Dominique Chateau, Yannick Geffroy, Philippe Queau, Arlindo Machado, Tetsuo Kogawa, and Bernard Teyssedre.

Artists included Fred Forest, Roy Ascott, Takahiko Iimura, Maurizio Bolognini, Tom Klinkowstein, Tom Sherman, Eduardo Kac, Enzo Minarelli, James Dashow, Peter D'Agostino, Mit Mitropoulos, Shawn Brixey, Bruno Di Bello, Antoni Muntadas, Orlan, Kit Galloway, David Rokeby, Miguel Chevalier, Norman White, Richard Kriesche, Olivier Auber, Caterina Davinio and Casey Reas.

The questions raised in various projects promoted by Artmedia, in a continuous dialogue between artists and theorists, led to discussions on topics including Aesthetics of Communication and the anthropology of the future (1985), Global aesthetic communication (1986), Electronic performativity and the art system (1990), Neo-technological arts between aesthetics and communication (1992), Aesthetic research and technology (1995), Developments in aesthetics: change or mutation? (1999), From the Aesthetics of Communication to Net art (2002), and Ethics, aesthetics and techno-communication. The future of meaning (2008).

All Artmedia symposiums have been followed by many publications. For the two held in Paris, a complete video recording is also available, and can be viewed at the Institut National de l'Audiovisuel.

An assessment of 25 years of Artmedia activity was made into a seminar on The aesthetic object of the future, held at the University of Salerno in 2009. The Artmedia project produced a large number of publications and documents that are being catalogued, with a view to their proper placement and use.

== Key areas of investigation ==
- Electronic music
- Photochemical versus digital photography
- Aesthetics of radio
- Electroacoustic poetry
- Electronic writing and poetry
- Video art
- Generative art and software art
- Computer art
- Aesthetics of networks
- Net art
- Aesthetics of virtual
- Telerobotics and remote interactivity
- Aesthetics of (technological) flux versus aesthetics of form

== Proceedings and catalogs ==
Artmedia I (1985)

- Mario Costa (ed.) (1985), Artmedia, Salerno: Opera Universitaria di Salerno (Catalog, pp. 206).

Artmedia II (1986)

- Mario Costa (ed.) (1986), Artmedia, II Convegno Internazionale di Estetica della comunicazione, Salerno: Università di Salerno (Catalog, pp. 80).

Artmedia III (1990)

- Mario Costa (ed.) (1990), Artmedia. Terzo Convegno Internazionale di Estetica dei Media e della Comunicazione. Catalogo, Salerno: Università degli Studi di Salerno (Catalog, pp. 80).
- Mario Costa (ed.) (1990), Artmedia. Terzo Convegno Internazionale di Estetica dei Media e della Comunicazione. Atti, Salerno: Università degli Studi di Salerno (Proceedings, pp. 96).

Artmedia IV (1992)

- Mario Costa (ed.) (1992), Nuovi media e sperimentazione d’artista, Naples: Edizioni Scientifiche Italiane (including Artmedia IV Proceedings, pp. 1–156).

Artmedia V (1995)

- Università degli Studi di Salerno, Comune di Salerno (1995), Quinto Convegno Internazionale di Estetica dei Media e della Comunicazione, Salerno (maquette).

Artmedia VI (1997)

- Università degli Studi di Salerno, Fondazione Filiberto Menna (1997), Artmedia VI, Salerno (maquette).

Artmedia VII (1999)

- Mario Costa (ed.) (1999), Artmedia VII, Settimo Convegno Internazionale di Estetica dei Media e della Comunicazione, Salerno: Università degli Studi di Salerno (Catalog, pp. 60).

Artmedia VIII (2002)

- Dossier Artmedia VIII, in "Ligeia", Paris, 2002, pp. 21–245 (CNRF journal, including Artmedia VIII Proceedings).
- Mario Costa (ed.) (2004), New Technologies: Roy Ascott, Maurizio Bolognini, Fred Forest, Richard Kriesche, Mit Mitropoulos, Salerno: Artmedia, Museo del Sannio (Catalog, pp. 64).

Artmedia IX (2005)

- Mario Costa (ed.) (2005), Phenomenology of New Tech Arts, Salerno: Università di Salerno (Catalog, pp. 56).

Artmedia X (2008)

- Mario Costa, Fred Forest (eds) (2011), Ethique, esthétique, communication technologique dans l'art contemporain ou le destin du sens, Paris: Institut National Audiovisuel, Editions L'Harmattan (including Artmedia X Proceedings).
