= Dominique Moulon =

French art historian and critic (born 1962)

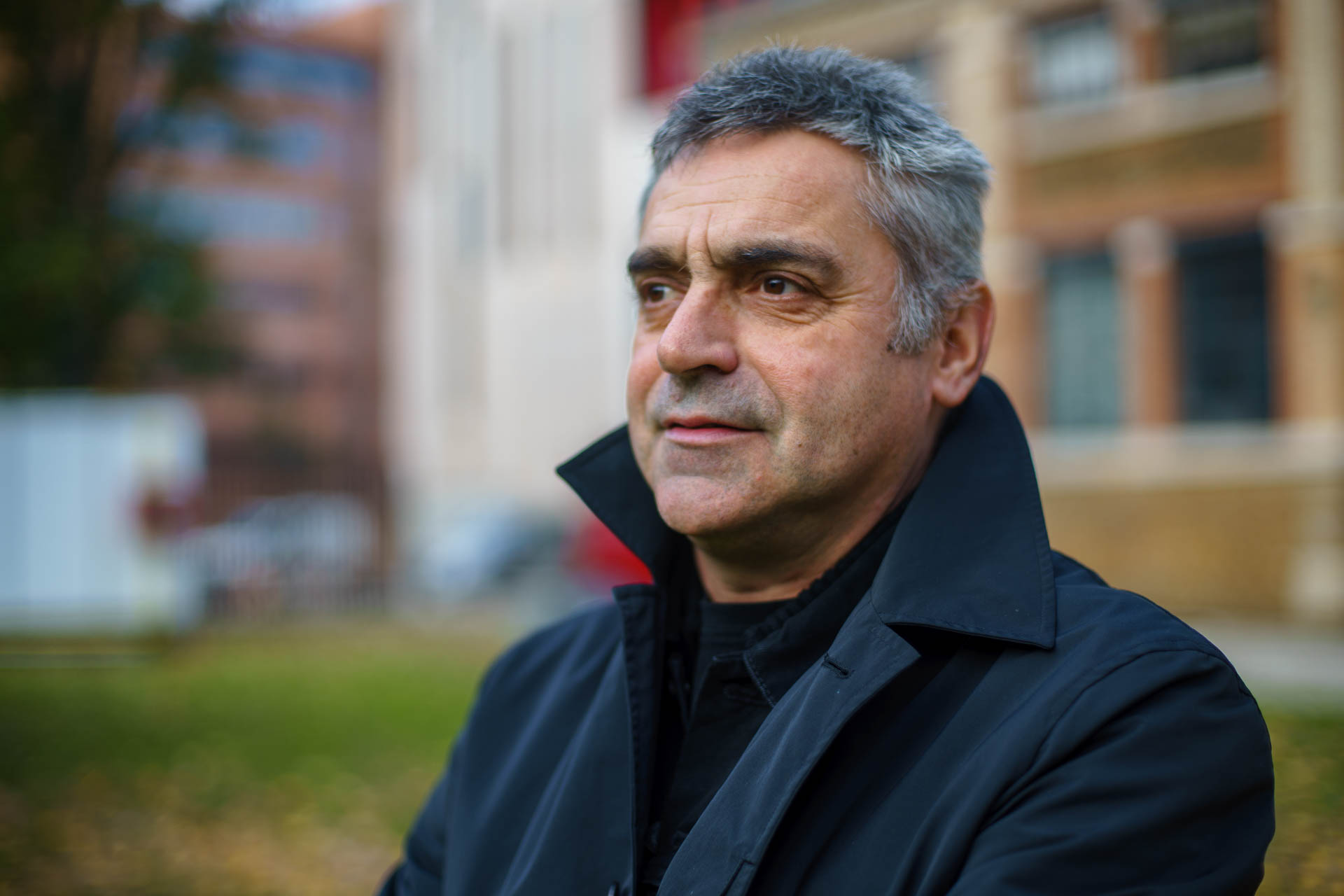
- Photographed by Stéphane Bissières in 2016 at EPSAA School in Paris.
- Born: 1962 (age 63–64); Bourges, France
- Known for: Digital art, New media art

Dominique Moulon (born 1962) is a historian of art and technology, art critic and curator, specializing in French digital art. He is the author of the books Art contemporain nouveaux médias, Art Beyond Digital and Masterpieces of the 21st Century.

== Background ==
Dominique Moulon began his activities as an art historian of new media art and computer art by obtaining a Diplôme National Supérieur d’Expression Plastique in 1987 from the Ecole Nationale Supérieure d’Art in Bourges France. In 1993 he obtained a Diplôme d’Etudes Approfondies en esthétique, sciences et technologies des arts from the University of Paris VIII. He obtained a PhD in Arts and sciences of the art from the University of Paris 1 Pantheon-Sorbonne in 2017 and is a research associate at the ACTE Institute.

In 2002 he completed an extensive research project called Outils et Création Numérique, which in detail conveyed the techniques computer artists were using in France. He paid close attention to interactivity and developed a philosophical investigation of the real and the virtual, and its multisensory nature by stressing an aesthetics of technology. This work was conducted for the Recherche et Innovation department of the Délégation aux Arts Plastiques of the Ministère de la Culture et de la Communication. Here Moulon began his work documenting the historical record of the relationship between technology and digital forms of art, extending the historic work of Frank Popper, Jack Burnham and Gene Youngblood. Key to his initial thinking and activities as an aesthetician, cultural theorist, curator, teacher, and art critic was his encounter with the work of Pierre Restany, Jean-Louis Boissier, Roy Ascott, Edmond Couchot, Christine Buci-Glucksmann and Fred Forest.

Working with the Délégation au Développement et aux Affaires Internationales, in 2004 he created a website to share his research at nouveauxmedias.net. In 2008 he initiated the English version of this website on newmediaart.eu. He also created mediaartdesign.net in 2011 and artinthedigitalage.net in 2018 to continue sharing his research on the relationship between art, technology and society. He was responsible for the digital art section of the French paper magazine "Images Magazine" from 2003 to 2010 and has contributed to the French Magazine “Art press” since 2013. He taught at the Parsons School of Design in Paris from 2014 to 2021 and has been was a regular visiting instructor from 2007 to 2022 at the School of the Art Institute of Chicago.

He has also curated exhibitions, such as L'art et le numérique en résonance at the art center of Mason Populaire in Montreuil, France, Variation Media Art Fair and Zero Autonomy at Cité International des Art in Paris, Human Learning (2020), Decision Making (2022), Endless Variations (2024) at the Canadian Cultural Center in Paris, by focusing on the using of digital in art to highlight societal issues.

Interested in the role of technology in art, Dominique Moulon focuses on the artistic uses of Generative Artificial Intelligence through several exhibitions in the mid-2020s. These include a group exhibition as part of the AI Action Summit 2025 at the Grand Palais in Paris, as well as the solo exhibitions Memo Akten: Boundaries during the 2024 Venice Biennale and Louis Paul Caron: Facing the Challenge at the French Pavilion of the 2026 Malta Biennale.

== Exhibitions ==
- Du savoir-rêve: Aurèce Vettier, Artverse Gallery, Paris, April 7 - May 13, 2026.
- Louis Paul Caron: Facing the Challenge, French Pavilion, Malta Biennial, Valletta, March 14 - May 29, 2026.
- Code + Matter, Nemo Biennial, Galerie Joseph, Paris, October 21–26, 2025.
- Colors of Korea, with Haeyoung-Yoomine Kim, Boram Jung and Valentina Buzzi, Korean Cultural Center, Paris, from October 24, 2025, to August 29, 2026.
- Memory Coexistence, with Maria Grazia Mattei, Yuelai Ruan and Susa Pop, MEET Digital Culture Center, Milan, from October 2 to November 2, 2025.
- AI Action Summit, Grand Palais, Paris, February 10–11, 2025.
- Michelangelo Penso: Magnetic nanoparticles Genesis, Galleria Alberta Pane, Paris, February 1 - March 29, 2025.
- Memo Akten: Boundaries, Santa Maria della Visitazione, Venice, April 20 - November 24, 2024.
- Reactivations, Danae, Paris, February 28 - March 28, 2024.
- Noise Media Art Fair, Kadıköy Kent Museum, Istanbul, January 13–21, 2024.
- Multitude & Singularity, Le Bicolore - Maison du Danemark, Paris, December 8, 2023 - February 25, 2024.
- Endless Variations, with Alain Thibault and in collaboration with Catherine Bédard, Canadian Cultural Center, Paris, December 7, 2023 - Arpri 19, 2024.
- Another Perspective, [Senne], Brussels, April 20 – May 7, 2023.
- Computing Beauty, Gallery A.dition, Seoul, May 27 - September 27, 2022.
- Art Me!, Galerie Charlot, Paris, April 21 - July 30, 2022
- Decision Making: The Decisive Instant, with Alain Thibault and in collaboration with Catherine Bédard, Canadian Cultural Centre, Paris, December10th 2021 - April 15, 2022.
- Human Learning: Machines Teach Us, with Alain Thibault and in collaboration with Catherine Bédard, Canadian Cultural Centre, Paris, February 5 - August 28, 2020.

== Publications ==
- Multiplying Points of View, in Pascal Dombis: Post-Digital (monograph), Skira, Paris, 2025, p. 76-81, ISBN 9782370742650.
- Masterpieces of the 21st Century, 2021, Art in the Digital Age, 224 pages, ISBN 979-8-547-78536-8.
- Japan, Art and Innovation in Transphere 2016 - 2020, (exhibition catalog), Japan Foundation, Tokyo, 2021, p. 48-49, ISBN 978-4-87540-183-4.
- Art, Technology and Trends, in ats@50: Art and Technology Studies; 1969-2019, Eduardo Kac (edited by), School of the Art Institute, Chicago, 2019, p. 40-47, ISBN 978-0-578-51202-0.
- Capturing the invisible, in Mathilde Lavenne (exhibition catalog), Casa de Velázquez, Madrid, 2019, p. 2-3.
- Moulon, Dominique, Art Beyond Digital, Link Editions, Brescia 2018. Paperback, 352 pages, ISBN 9780244085926.
- On Combinations at Work, in Pascal Dombis (monograph), Supernova, Paris, 2018, p. 115-119, ISBN 978-2-490353-00-2.
- Exhibiting the Museum: The Hybrid Spaces of Workspace Unlimited, in Practicable: From Participation to Interaction in Contemporary Art, Samuel Bianchini & Erik Verhagen (edited by), The MIT Press, Leonardo Book Series, Cambridge, 2016, p. 543-549, ISBN 9780262034753.
- Moulon, Dominique. Art et numérique en résonance, Nouvelles éditions Scala, 2015, French, 158 pages, ISBN 978-2-35988-156-1.
- Conversation, in Bill Vorn and his hysterical machines: robotic art and culture, Ryszard W. Kluszczyński (Edited by), CCA Laznia, Gdansk, 2014, p. 52-73, ISBN 978-83-61646-05-1.
- Moulon, Dominique, Timothy Murray, Derrick de Kerckhove, Oliver Grau, Kristine Stiles, Jean-Baptiste Barrière, Jean-Pierre Balpe, Maurice Benayoun Open Art, Nouvelles éditions Scala, 2011, French, 196 pages, ISBN 978-2-35988-046-5.
- Fifty questions for Eduardo Kac, in Life, Light & Language (exhibition catalog), Centre des Arts, Enghien-les-Bains, 2011, p. 10-84, ISBN 978-2-916639-17-8.
- Moulon, Dominique. Art contemporain nouveaux médias, Nouvelles éditions Scala Collection: Sentiers d'Art, 2011, French, 128 pages, ISBN 2-35988-038-1 ISBN 978-2359880380.

== Conférences on Art & Technology ==
- The diversity of digital art ecosystems, Non-Fungible Conference, Lisbon, Portugal, June 4, 2026.
- (Dis)Obedient Code: When Refusal Becomes Form, Rethinking Digital Resistance Through Art & Tech Festivals, Gwangju Media Art Platform, Gwangju, November 27, 2025.
- Artist Talk with Cecilie Waagner Falkenstrøm & Dominique Moulon, Le Bicolore, Paris, October 10, 2025.
- The Digital Art Market: Challenges And Opportunities, International Marketplace for digital art, Biennale Elektra, Arsenal Contemporary Art, Montreal, Canada, 2024.
- #art #tech #society, MMMAD Festival, Madrid, Spain, 2024.
- AI and Art: the struggle, Bozar, Brussels, Belgium, 2023.
- Imagination versus Reality, Bozar, Brussels, Belgium, 2022.
- Reality versus Imagination, Bozar, Brussels, Belgium, 2022.
- Interconnections between Visual Art, Digital Art and NFTs, with Frederic Laffy, Masha Maskina, Albertine Meunier and Pau Waelder, CADAF, Online, 2021.
- Future potential of Virtual Reality, with Tina Sauerländer, Jay Kim and Olivier Fontenay, Symposium Making Lemonade, Online, 2021.
- Photography, computation & globalization, Theme Academic Forum, Photo Beijing, Online, 2020.
- The art of acting somewhere else, Symposium Adventures of Identity: From the Double to the Avatar, Institut d'Etudes Avancées, Paris, France, 2018.
- Machines, Intelligence and Creativity, Institute of Science and Technology for Humanity, Nanyang Technological University, Singapore, 2018.
- Creation and Contemporary Art: Digital art does not exist!, International Digital Arts Market, Phi Centre, Montreal, Canada, 2018.
- Coefficient of Digital, International Symposium on Electronic Art (ISEA), Manizales, Colombia, 2017.
- Digital Coefficient, International Symposium on Electronic Art (ISEA), Vancouver, Canada, 2015.
- Digital as Contemporary Art, Media Art Futures Conference, Centro Párraga, Murcia, Spain, 2015.
- Digital practices of contemporary art, Interface Culture, University of Arts, Linz, Austria, 2014.
- De la ville comme atelier pour un art de relations, Lumières de la ville, 5e Biennale Internationale Toronto Montréal Lille, laboratoire Hexagram CIAM, Université du Québec à Montreal, Canada, 2013.
- Art, Science Technology and Society, Cumulus Conference, Aalto University, Helsinki, Finland, 2012.
- Art, lumière et langages, Syncretic Transcodings, Laboratoire Hexagram CIAM, Université du Québec à Montreal, Canada, 2012.
- Forum des usages coopératifs, Ecole Nationale Supérieure des Télécommunications, Brest 2008.
- Art, médias, dispositifs, Le Fresnoy, Studio national des arts contemporains, Tourcoing 2008.
- The Upgrade @ Mal au Pixel, avec les membres du collectif HeHE, Paris 2008.
- Art, médias et dispositifs, Locus Sonus, Villa Arson, Nice 2008.
- Arts numériques & nouveaux médias, Le Fresnoy, Studio national des arts contemporains, Tourcoing 2007.
- The Upgrade @ Seconde Nature, avec les membres du laboratoire Locus Sonus, Aix-en-Provence 2007.
- Jeudi Multimédia, Médiathèque Assia Djebar, Blanquefort 2007.
- Digital Art in Europe Now, School of the Art Institute of Chicago, Chicago 2007.
- The Upgrade, avec les membres du collectif CHDH, Point Ephémère, Paris 2007.
- Les pratiques du numérique dans la création artistique, Pôle de Ressources Arts Plastiques, Rennes 2007.
- Marché International des Arts Numériques, Festival Elektra, Cinémathèque québécoise, Montréal 2007.
- Media Art in France, Département Intermedia, Académie des Beaux-Arts de Hongris, Budapest 2007.
- The Upgrade, avec Maurice Benayoun, Galerie Numeriscausa, Paris 2006.
- Les Arts Médiatiques en France, Manifestation d'Art Contemporain, Paris 2006.
- Art, Science, Technologie et Société, Le Fresnoy, Studio national des arts contemporains, Tourcoing 2006.
- The Upgrade, avec Antoine Schmitt, Ars Longa, Paris 2006.
- Le numérique et l'acte photographique aujourd'hui, Rencontres Internationales de la Photographie, Arles 2006.
- Forum des usages coopératifs, Ecole Nationale Supérieure des Télécommunications, Brest 2006.
- New Media Art in France, an overview, School of Visual Arts, New York City 2006.
- New Media Art in France, an overview, Art Institute, Chicago 2006.
- Ecrits Ecrans Publics, Les expressions multimédia dans la ville, Le Quartz, Brest 2006.
- Arts et technologies, Espace Culture Multimédia La Maison Populaire, Montreuil 2005.
- Arts, sciences et technologies, ECM / Cyber-base du Carré Amelot, La Rochelle 2005.
- Les Imagies - Nouvelles images, nouvelles pratiques, CNDP - CRDP, Montpellier 2005.
- Rencontres Internationales de Lure, Lurs 2005.
- Rencontres Espace Culture Multimédia, Friche la Belle de Mai, Marseille 2005.
- Les nouveaux médias dans l'art, Ecole de Communication Visuelle, Aix-en-Provence 2005.
- Digital art in France, School of Visual Arts, New York City 2005.
- Les arts numériques en France, Ecole Supérieure des Arts et Techniques, Paris 2005.
- La forge des outils numériques, Ecole Supérieure de l'Image, Poitiers 2003.
- Et voilà le travail - Image par image, Montreuil 2003.
- Espaces publics : quels lieux communs, Ferme du Buisson, Noisiel 2001.
- La photographie après la photographie, exposition Biozones, Forum Culturel de Blanc-Mesnil 2001.

== Jury References ==
- Aide à la Création Multimédia Expérimentale, Acadi, Paris 2008.
- Ecole de Communication Visuelle, Section Nouvelles Images, Bordeaux 2008.
- Aide à la Création Multimédia Expérimentale, Acadi, Paris 2008.
- Thèse "Impressions visuelles de l’art à la science" de Sylvie Huart, ATI, Université Paris VIII 2008.
- Aide à la Création Multimédia Expérimentale, Acadi, Paris 2007.
- Aide à la Création Multimédia Expérimentale, Acadi, Paris 2006.
- Diplôme de Communication Visuelle, Ecole Supérieure des Arts et Techniques, Paris 2005.
- Diplôme de Concepteur en Communication Visuelle, Ecole de Communication Visuelle, Bordeaux 2001.
