= Berger Foundation =

Berger Foundation or The Berger Foundation may refer to:

- H.N. and Frances C. Berger Foundation, an education and support foundation based in Palm Desert, California
- Jacques-Édouard Berger Foundation, an arts foundation in Switzerland
- Roland Berger Foundation, a human rights foundation in Munich, Germany
