= The Space Observatory (Observatoire de l'Espace) =

The Observatoire de l’Espace (Space Observatory) is a cultural laboratory created in 2000 by CNES (the French Space Agency) to promote a new vision of outer space, different from that of popular science. Space has a major influence on people's perceptions and imagination. The Observatoire de l’Espace introduces artists to the activities of the CNES and paves the way for any kind of space-inspired creations. Those creations strongly connected to space art are thereafter shared with the wider audience.

== Programmes ==
As a cultural laboratory, the Observatoire de l’Espace has a specific methodology: the goal is to share space-related items and innovations with artists, in order to inspire new creations. Two programmes have been developed following this process.

=== Avant-Poste (Vanguard) ===
This programme procures artists with access to Space through zero gravity flights, stratospheric air balloons or Space stations. By offering this kind of access to the physical characteristics of Space, the Observatoire de l'Espace promotes new visions of Space Adventure and a form of interaction with the cosmic environment which values collaboration over domination or extractivism. In 2026, an exhibition held at the Espace de l'art concret, in southern France, presented a selection of works created within this programme.

=== Archéologie de l'Espace (Space Archeology) ===
This programme is aimed at artists who seek a deeper understanding of the materiality of Space endeavours. Archives, photos, schematics of instruments and rovers or ground infrastructures form the base of their artistic work. This approach tries, by looking directly of artefacts produced throughout the history of Space exploration, to move beyond classic depictions of Space. In 2025, a selection of works from this programme was exhibited at La Friche, in Marseille, in a show titled La vie de l'Espace.

=== Former programmes (2005-2021) ===
==== Cultural studies of Space ====
For many years, the Observatoire de l’Espace has been developing a cultural story of outer space by building an inventory of everything created on Earth about outer space. It resulted in a wide classification: space instruments (for example satellite prototypes), audio and video items (documentaries, video archives...), works of art inspired by outer space, laboratories and other space related buildings, and all kinds of everyday life objects. The Observatoire de l’Espace is also welcoming researchers in human sciences and art history as well as building partnerships with research laboratories to foster works about Space in those fields. An academic blog called Humanités spatiales (Space humanities) was also created in 2015. This website is dedicated to analysis and dialogue for researchers who are interested in space activities and its cultural representations. All this work can be used by artists as a basis for new creations.

==== Spatial Creation and Imagination ====
The Observatoire de l’Espace fosters space-related artistic creation through its programme called "Création et Imaginaire spatial" (Spatial creation and imagination) which enables artists to benefit from an off-site residency. Various immersive ways to discover the space field are suggested to the artists: interviews with space experts, scientific data and documentation, access to places where spatial activities take place (laboratories, technical or industrial centers...), participation in scientists seminaries or even weightlessness flights aboard the Airbus Zero-G. Many creations arise from this programme: from literature to contemporary art and from performing arts to contemporary music. Many cultural events are organized by the Observatoire de l’Espace in order to present those creations but they are also displayed in many cultural places .

== Events ==
=== Exhibitions ===
The Observatoire de l'Espace curates and produces contemporary art exhibitions, frequently in association with other French contemporary art centers. These exhibitions feature artworks produced within the Observatoire de l'Espace's artistic programmes, newly created or selected from its contemporary art collection. Since 2024, exhibitions have taken place in various art centers such as the Centre Wallonie-Bruxelles in Paris, the Friche la Belle de Mai in Marseille, or the Espace de l'Art Concret in Mouans-Sartoux.

=== Sideration festival ===
The Sideration festival took place every year in March at the CNES’ headquarters in Paris from 2011 to 2019. It enabled a deep immersion in Space and imagination through an eclectic programme: theatre, music, video, cinema, visual arts, readings and even real or fictional science stories. Every year, the CNES’ headquarters became a large art-science stage where about 30 artists had the opportunity to exhibit their space related productions. Those creations were often the result of a strong collaboration with the artists through the « off-site » residency programme, the sharing of studies about space or through calls for submissions regarding the journal Espace(s).

=== Nuit Blanche (All-nighter) ===
The Observatoire de l’Espace regularly curates exhibitions for the Nuit Blanche which is an annual all night long, cultural, free arts festival. Since 2014, the Observatoire de l’Espace has called for artistic projects dealing with Space history. Selected archives are given to artists in order to widen their imagination or to be the core material of their creations. Archives and creations are both exhibited during the Nuit Blanche at the CNES’ headquarter.

== Publications ==
The journal Espace(s) discontinued, was an semi-annual journal dedicated to literature and a large variety of creations (typography, performing arts, comic strip, music, poetry...). It gathered texts dealing with a chosen theme linked with Space (Dreams, revolt, revolution, or Obsession and fascination). About thirty authors contributed to each issue. This collection is written under the format of laboratory books in order to mix up both literary and scientific universes. The works of the Spatial creation and imagination programme, made by the artists in residency, also have their place in the journal.

It has been replaced by another French written journal: Arts et Espace, entirely dedicated to visual arts that showcases productions from the artists in residence at the Observatoire de l'Espace.

Other publications cover long-term artistic projects, such as Télescope intérieur an art project by Brazilian-American artist Eduardo Kac performed at the ISS by French Astronaut Thomas Pesquet, or cultural research programmes with a trilogy retelling French Space exploration, and catalogs from exhibitions curated by the Observatoire de l'Espace.
