= Karczmar =

Karczmar is a Polish surname. Notable people with the surname include:

- Alex Karczmar (1917–2017), Polish-American neuroscientist and academic
- Natan Karczmar (born 1933), French cultural event promoter, book and magazine publisher, theater producer, photographer, and painter.

== See also ==
- Karczmarz
