= Karczmarz =

Karczmarz is a Polish surname. Notable people with the surname include:

- Kazimierz Karczmarz (1933–2011), Polish botanist and bryologist
- Rafał Karczmarz (born 1999), Polish speedway rider

== See also ==
- Karczmar
