= Maurizio Bolognini =

Italian artist

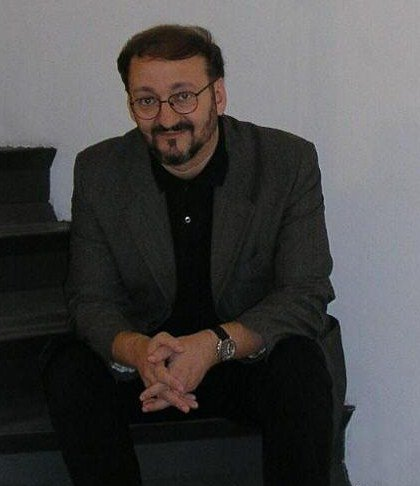
Maurizio Bolognini (2004)

Maurizio Bolognini (born 27 July 1952) is a post-conceptual media artist. His installations are mainly concerned with the aesthetics of machines, and are based on the minimal and abstract activation of technological processes that are beyond the artist's control, at the intersection of generative art, public art and e-democracy.

== Background ==
Maurizio Bolognini was born in Brescia, Italy. Before working as a media artist, he received degrees in Urban studies and Social science from the University of Birmingham, UK, and the Università Iuav di Venezia. He worked extensively as a researcher in the field of structured communication techniques (such as the real-time Delphi method), and electronic democracy, which he later used in some interactive installations. His research interests and a wide range of artworks have focused on three main dimensions of digital technologies:

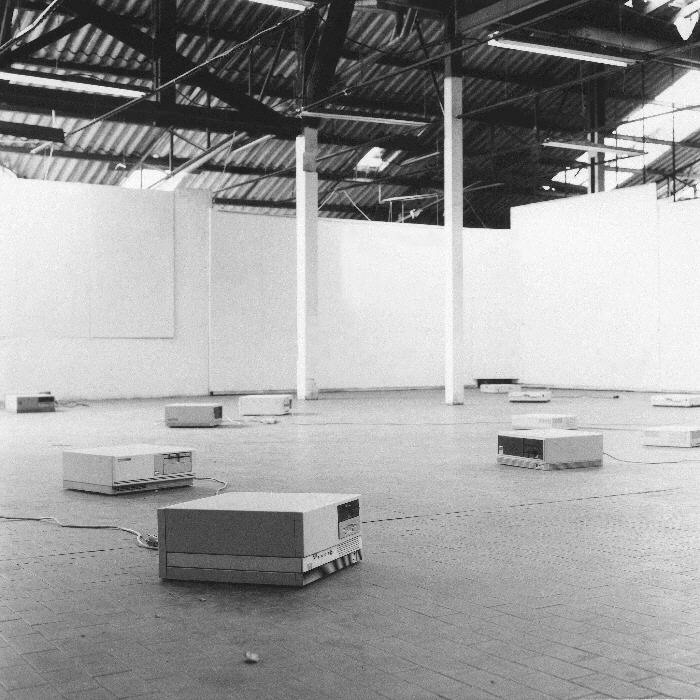
Sealed Computers (Nice, 1997). This installation uses computer codes to create endless flows of random images which will never be accessible for viewing.

- the possibility of delegating his artistic action to the infinite time of the machine, such as in his Programmed Machines. From the beginning (1988), this series introduced the concept of infinity into his work, and focused on "the experience of the disproportion (and disjunction) between artist and the artwork, which is made possible by computer-based technologies";
- the space-time flows of technological communication, and the interplay of geographical and electronic space, which gave rise to works such as Altavista (1996), Antipodes (1998), and Museophagia (1998–99), in which the use of web-based communication flows focused on their physical infrastructure and was often combined with actions taken over long distance travels;
- the introduction of new forms of interactivity based upon structured communication techniques and e-democracy, which he used in works such as the CIMs (Collective Intelligence Machines, since 2000) and ICB (Interactive Collective Blue, 2006).

Some of these works were developed through intense cooperation with Artmedia, the Laboratory of the Aesthetics of Media and Communication, University of Salerno, and the Laboratory Museum of Contemporary Art (MLAC), Sapienza University of Rome. In 2003, the MLAC published a monograph book on Bolognini's work. In 2004, Artmedia organised a show which was aimed to highlight a European tendency in new media art, based on the concept of the technological sublime. The show included works by Roy Ascott (English), Maurizio Bolognini (Italian), Fred Forest (French), Richard Kriesche (Austrian) and Mit Mitropoulos (Greek).

== Programmed Machines / Sealed Computers ==
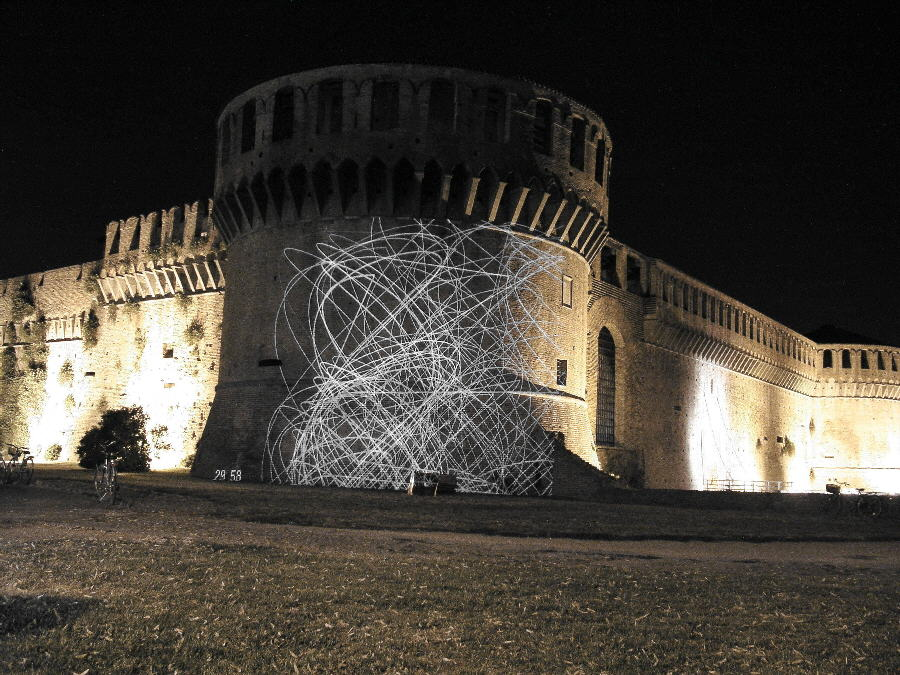
SMSMS-SMS Mediated Sublime/CIM series (computer, audience cell phones, video projector), Imola, Italy, 2006: an interactive installation that aims to involve the audience in the experience of the manipulation and consumption of the technological sublime.

In 1988, Bolognini began using personal computers to generate flows of continuously expanding random images. In the 1990s, he programmed hundreds of these computers and left them to run endlessly (most of these are still working now). About his Programmed Machines he wrote: "I do not consider myself an artist who creates certain images, and I am not merely a conceptual artist. I am one whose machines have actually traced more lines than anyone else, covering boundless surfaces. I am not interested in the formal quality of the images produced by my installations but rather in their flow, their limitlessness in space and time, and the possibility of creating parallel universes of information made up of kilometres of images and infinite trajectories. My installations serve to generate out-of-control infinities."

The Programmed Machines (and in particular the Sealed Computers, since 1992, whose monitor buses are closed with wax and whose graphic outputs cannot be displayed) are considered among his most significant works. These Machines were exhibited in many museums and art galleries, in Europe and the United States. In 2003, some Machines were exhibited in three simultaneous shows arranged at the Laboratory Museum of Contemporary Art in Rome, the CACTicino Center for Contemporary Art in Switzerland, and the Williamsburg Art & Historical Center in New York. In 2005, the Villa Croce Museum of Contemporary Art, Genoa, dedicated a retrospective and a monograph to these works.

Since 2000, Bolognini has concentrated on combining the Programmed Machines with communication devices, as in the Collective Intelligence Machines. These are interactive installations connecting some of his generative machines to the mobile telephone network, to allow a real-time Delphi-like interaction by members of the public. These installations delegate choices to both electronic devices and processes of communication and e-democracy with the aim of involving the audience in new forms of “generative, interactive and public art”.

Maurizio Bolognini's work has been considered relevant to the theory of the technological sublime and the aesthetics of flux (as opposed to the aesthetics of form), and has been seen as a further development of conceptual art within neo-technological art.

== See also ==
- Conceptual art
- Post-conceptual
- Generative art
- New Media Art
- Public art
- Systems art
- Electronic art
- Interactive art
