= Eduardo Kac =

Brazilian artist

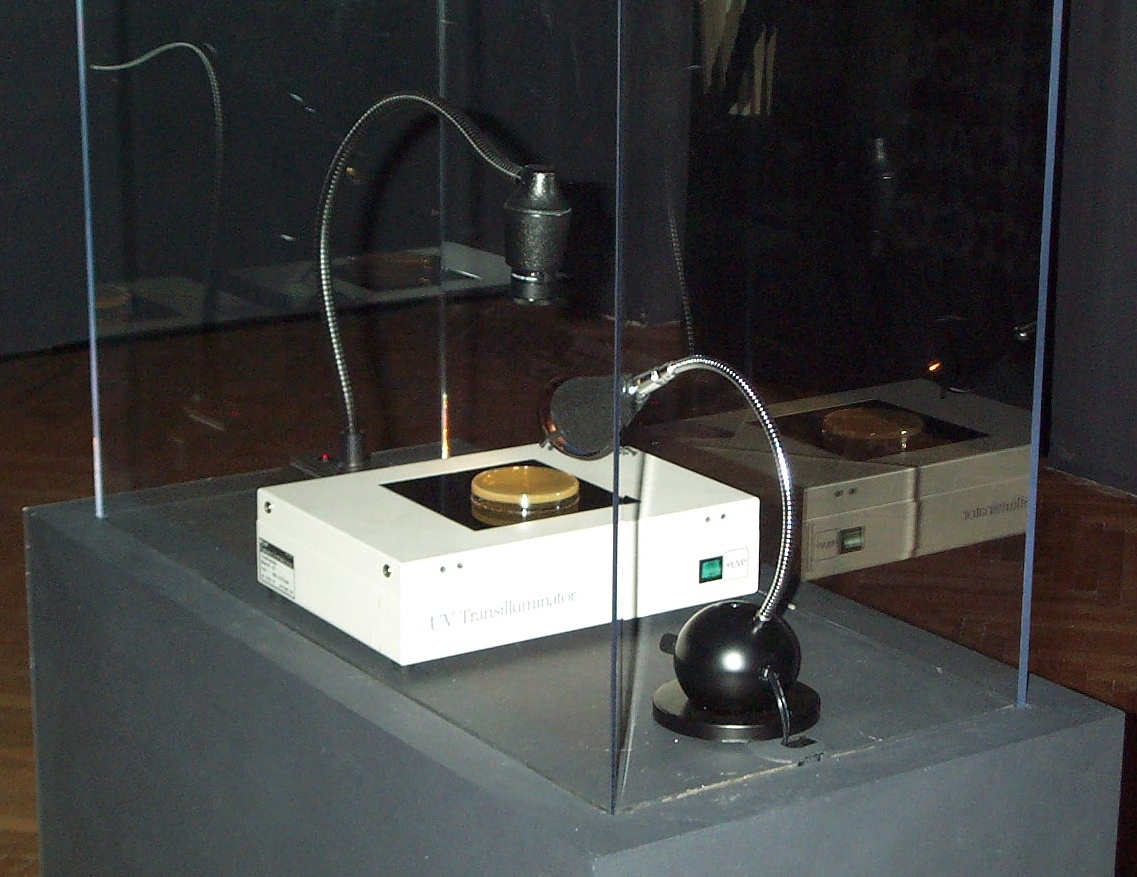
- Kac's installation Genesis, displayed at the 1999 Ars Electronica Festival
- Born: July 3, 1962 (age 64); Rio de Janeiro, Brazil
- Awards: Ars Electronica Golden Nica
- Website: www.ekac.org

Eduardo Kac (born July 3, 1962) is a Brazilian and American contemporary artist whose portfolio encompasses various forms of art including performance art, poetry, holography, interactive art, digital and online art, and BioArt. Recognized for his space art and transgenic works, Kac works with biotechnology to create organisms with new genetic attributes. His interdisciplinary approach has seen the use of diverse mediums, from fax and photocopying to fractals, RFID implants, virtual reality, networks, robotics, satellites, telerobotics, virtual reality and DNA synthesis.

== Life ==
Kac was born July 3, 1962, in Rio de Janeiro, Brazil. He became fluent in English as a child. He studied at the School of Communications of the Pontifical Catholic University of Rio de Janeiro, receiving a BA degree in 1985, and then at the School of the Art Institute of Chicago where he received an MFA degree in 1990. In 2003 he received a doctorate from the Planetary Collegium at the University of Wales, Great Britain. Kac is a professor of art at the School of the Art Institute of Chicago.

== Art career ==
Kac began his art career in 1980 as a performance artist in Rio de Janeiro, Brazil. In 1982 he created his first digital work and in 1983 he invented Holopoetry, exploring holography as an interactive art form. In 1985 he began creating animated poetic works on the French Minitel platform.

Throughout the 1980s Kac created telecommunications artworks, using media such as fax, television, and slow scan TV. In 1986 Kac created his first work of telepresence art, in which he used robots to bridge two or more physical locations. During the 1990s he continued to produce these works, expanding his practice with works of interspecies communications.

Kac coined the term "bio art". Kac also created various terms to describe his transdisciplinary art practice, including biorobotics (functional merger of robotics and biotechnology), "plantimal" (plant with animal genetic material or animal with plant genetic material), and transgenic art (the expression of genes from one species in another in an artwork).

Early notable works include "Genesis" (1999), where Kac translated a Genesis line into morse code and subsequently into DNA base pair and "GFP Bunny" (2000), where an albino rabbit was genetically altered with a jellyfish gene, causing it to emit a green glow under specific light conditions. This piece ignited extensive debates on the ethical implications of altering life forms for artistic purposes.

Kac's focus on space art encompasses decades-long effort to complete "Ágora" (1986–2023), a project designed for deep space. Over the years, he has collaborated with both NASA and SpaceX. His collaboration with French astronaut Thomas Pesquet in "Inner Telescope" (2017) led to the creation of a sculpture in space. Another of his artworks, "Adsum", made its journey to the International Space Station in 2022, in preparation for its final flight to the Moon. Kac has been an active participant in events promoting the convergence of art and space exploration, such as those organized by the Space Observatory, an office of France's National Center for Space Studies.

=== 1980s ===
In 1980 Kac launched the Movimento de Arte Pornô (Porn Art Movement) on Ipanema Beach, in Rio de Janeiro, with the stated goal of subverting the logic of normative pornography at the service of activism and imagination. Working under the extremely conservative political climate of Brazil under a military dictatorship, Kac and other Movement members, such as Glauco Mattoso, Leila Míccolis, and Hudinilson Jr., developed the new body-centered aesthetics collectively until 1982. Kac was also a performer with the Gang, the performance unit of the Movimento de Arte Pornô; the Gang performed in São Paulo, Rio de Janeiro, and other cities.

Beginning in 1982, Kac started to create digital works. In 1983 Kac invented holographic poetry (which he also called Holopoetry), the first of which was HOLO/OLHO, named after the Portuguese word for "eye". 23 holographic poems followed this first work, including Quando? (When?) (1987), a cylindrical work that could be read in two directions.

Around the same time, and drawing on his interest in experimental poetry forms, Kac began making animated poetry works with the French Minitel system that was then in use in Brazil. In 1985 he contributed one such work, Reabracadabra, to the Arte On Line exhibition, organized by the Livraria Nobel bookstore in São Paulo. Other Minitel animated poems by Kac include Recaos (1986), Tesão (1985/86) and D/eu/s (1986). In 1986, with Flavio Ferraz, Kac organized the Brasil High-Tech exhibition at the Galeria de Arte Centro Empresarial Rio in Rio de Janeiro.

From 1985 to as late as 1994, Kac did a number of telecommunications artworks that used Slow-scan television (SSTV), FAX, and live television, to create interactive exchanges between separate locations.

In 1986 Kac created his first telepresence artwork, using a robot to connect distant audiences. In 1988 he began work on his Ornitorrinco project, a telepresence artwork completed in Chicago, in 1989, in collaboration with Ed Bennett. The work brought together robotics, telecommunications technologies and interactivity to create a robot that was controlled remotely. The piece allowed viewers in one location to control the robot's camera and motion, creating a telepresent work and effecting the experience of viewers in the other location.

In 1989 Kac moved from Rio de Janeiro to Chicago, where he would complete his MFA at the Art Institute of Chicago the following year.

=== 1990s ===
In the 1990s, Kac continued creating telematic works, with Dialogical Drawing (1994) and Essay Concerning Human Understanding (1994) both using networks to explore the viewer experience of an artwork mediated between two sites in real time. In the latter case, the artwork joined a plant in New York city and a live canary in Kentucky in conversation. The inclusion of a bird and a plant as part of an interactive system is an early example of what Kac called interspecies communications.

In December 10,1990 Kac was work on a Telecommunications and an interactive Art call Interfaces. "Interfaces established a visual dialogue between the participants in a way that was purposefully similar to a verbal exchange between two people -- bringing the improvised and spontaneous feed-back loop of a personal conversation to the realm of video." Kac created Interfaces to have a conversation like is social media and Interfaces is visual dialogue displayed at The School of the Art Institute of Chicago between a group of artists in Chicago and another group of artists at Carnegie-Mellon University, Pittsburgh. "With telepresence, one subjects oneself to a remote robotic body and finds oneself inside that body, able to make decisions wirelessly through the network" from the two group artists it looks like they have conversations but instead of words they use pictures to share emotion by mixing the two pictures. as I'm look at telecommunication the technology coupon moving forward "telecommunicate technologies are no exception. In fact, one of the most important aesthetic implications of remoteness is making evident that multiple processes always filter or shape one's experience"

In 1996, Kac's space artwork Monogram was included in the DVD that flew to Saturn mounted to the side of the Cassini spacecraft.

In Teleporting An Unknown State (1994), Kac built a system that allowed a plant to survive in a gallery, illuminated not by direct sunlight but by the action of local or remote viewers of the work. In practice, local or remote viewers of the work selected from a set of webcams facing the sky of distant cities. A video projector above the plant relayed the webcam images to the plant, thus enabling it to do photosynthesis with light transmitted remotely. As a result, the system transmitted light values (frequency and amplitude) from distant skies to a local plant.

Kac coined the term "bio art" with his 1997 performance work Time Capsule. In Time Capsule, Kac implanted himself with an RFID chip originally designed for use in pets. A participant in Chicago then triggered the RFID scanned in the Brazilian gallery where Kac was performing, causing the scanner to display a unique code for the implant. Kac then registered himself on the pet database associated with the implant, becoming the first human to do so. Time Capsule was simultaneously live on television and the Internet.

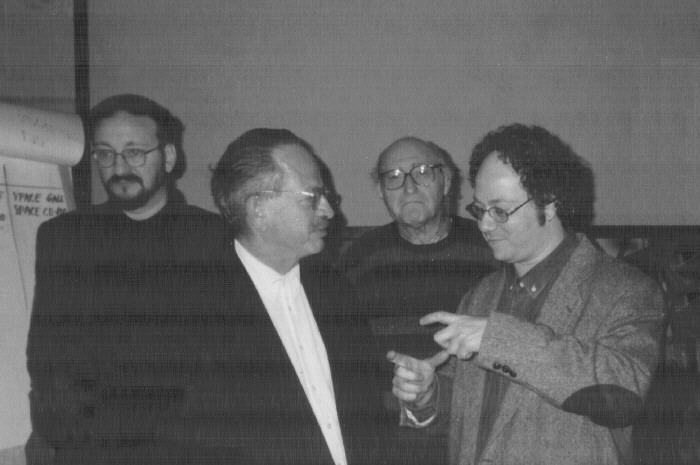
Maurizio Bolognini, Richard Kriesche, Mario Costa and Eduardo Kac, Artmedia VII (1999)

By the late 90s Kac defined himself either as a "transgenic artist" or a "bio artist", and was using biotechnology and genetics to create works that used scientific techniques and simultaneously critiqued them.

Kac's next transgenic artwork, created in 1998/99 and titled Genesis, involved him taking a quote from the Bible (Genesis 1:26 – "Let man have dominion over the fish of the sea, and over the fowl of the air, and over every living thing that moves upon the earth"), transferring it into Morse code, and finally, translating that Morse code (by a conversion principle specially developed by the artist for this work) into the base pairs of genetics. The new DNA sequence was introduced into bacteria. Participants were then able to shine ultraviolet lights onto the bacteria containing the new DNA, thus altering it. So when Kac translated it back to English, it said something completely different. Through this work, Kac encourages audiences to consider the new interconnectedness between biology, technology, and meaning.

=== 2000s ===
In one of his best known works, GFP Bunny, presented in 2000 in Avignon, France, Kac claimed to have commissioned a French laboratory to create a green-fluorescent rabbit; a rabbit born with a Green Fluorescent Protein (GFP) gene from a type of jellyfish. Kac named the rabbit Alba. Under a specific UV light, the rabbit fluoresces green. GFP Bunny proved to be hugely controversial, in part due to the unprecedented nature of the artwork, in part because of the general lack of familiarity with the safety of the process at the close of the twentieth century.

Kac's claimed that his original aim was for Alba to live with his family, but that prior to the scheduled release of Alba to Kac, the lab retracted their agreement and decided that Alba should remain in the lab. Kac responded by creating a series of works that called for her freedom. Other works would follow, focused on celebrating her life. In reality, Kac had only met Alba on his visit to the French lab. And while he had the consent of Houdebine to go in debate, the institution never agreed to public appearance of their GFP rabbits. When Kac's plea to get Alba was denied he went on to publish the artificially green photos, and declared it was his commission, and accused the institute of censorship.

GFP Bunny appeared in Big Bang Theory, Sherlock, and Simpsons, and in novels such as Oryx and Crake, by Margaret Atwood, and Next, by Michael Crichton.

His work Natural History of the Enigma (2003–2008) continued in the theme of bio art by merging his DNA with that of a petunia, creating a hybrid organism that Kac called a "plantimal". The plant, also given the name Edunia (from Eduardo and Petunia), mimicked the flow of blood through human veins by mixing Kac's DNA only with the plant's genetic components that made the veins in its leaves red.

=== 2010s ===
In 2017 Kac collaborated with French astronaut Thomas Pesquet to create an artwork in space called Inner Telescope, an artwork conceived for zero gravity and made aboard the International Space Station. Kac worked with the French Space Observatory office, from the French Space Agency, to have this work made in space by the astronaut Thomas Pesquet. Following Kac's instructions, Pesquet cut and folded two pieces of paper into a sculptural form. Floating in zero gravity, the form could be read as the three letters forming the French word for me, M-O-I, or a stylized human figure with the umbilical cord cut.

=== 2020s ===
Since 2019, Kac has been developing Adsum, an artwork for the Moon. Conceived in five phases, as of 2022 Kac had completed the first three milestones. Adsum is a glass artwork with four visual symbols internally laser-engraved in three dimensions and is meant to exist in the lunar environment. The four symbols that constitute the work are: an hourglass (representing time at a human scale), two circles (one large, representing the Earth; one small, representing the Moon), and the infinity symbol (representing time at a cosmic scale).

== Controversy ==
Eduardo Kac's work has frequently been an object of debate. One of the most prominent instances arose from his artwork "GFP Bunny" in 2000. The piece centered around Alba, an albino rabbit that was genetically engineered by incorporating the green fluorescent protein (GFP) from a jellyfish into her genome. This resulted in the rabbit possessing the ability to glow green under blue light. Some critics and animal rights activists raised concerns about the ethical implications of such genetic manipulation purely for the sake of art.

Kac's later project, "Inner Telescope", created inside the International Space Station (ISS), stirred debate of a different kind. The artwork, crafted from paper and designed to spell "Moi" (French for "me"), was a conceptual play on individual and collective self. The philosophical depth and utility of such an endeavor was questioned, particularly in the context of contemporary societal challenges. The project was also critiqued for potentially being an escape from the urgent issues on Earth, rather than addressing them head-on.

== Permanent collections ==
Kac's work is included in the permanent collections of the Museum of Modern Art, New York, Tate Modern, London, Institut Valencià d'Art Modern in Valencia, Spain, Reina Sophia Museum, Madrid, Spain, Les Abattoirs Toulouse, France, and the Victoria and Albert Museum, London. Several of Kac's artist's books are included in the library of the Metropolitan Museum of Art, New York.

== Awards ==
In 1998 he received the Leonardo Award for Excellence from ISAST. In 1999, he received the Inter Communication Center (Tokyo) Biennial Award in 1999.

In 2002 he received the Creative Capital Award in the discipline of Emerging Fields.

In 2008 he received the Golden Nica award at Ars Electronica for his project Natural History of the Enigma.

== Bibliography ==
Books by Eduardo Kac

- Luz & Letra: Ensaios De Arte, Literatura E Comunicação [Light & Letter: Essays on Art, Literature and Communication]. Rio de Janeiro: Contra Capa, 2004.
- Telepresence & Bio Art: Networking Humans, Rabbits, & Robots, Foreword James Elkins. Ann Arbor, Michigan: University of Michigan Press, 2005.
- Signs of Life: Bio Art and Beyond, MIT Press, Cambridge, 2007, ISBN 0-262-11293-0
- Media Poetry: an International Anthology (2nd edition), Bristol, United Kingdom, Intellect Books, 2007.

Catalogues and monographs of Eduardo Kac's exhibitions

- Eduardo Kac. Published on the occasion of Kac's mid-career survey, curated by Ángel Kalenberg. Valencia, Spain: Instituto Valenciano de Arte Moderno (IVAM) (in Spanish, English and Valencian), 2007. [Texts by Consuelo Císcar Casabán, Ángel Kalenberg, Didier Ottinger, Eleanor Heartney, Steve Tomasula, Gunalan Nadaranjan, Annick Bureaud, Eduardo Kac, Santiago Grisolía. Also includes a Critical Anthology, Chronology, and Bibliography]
- Kac, Eduardo. Hodibis Potax: Poetry Anthology [Oeuvres poétiques]. Ivry-sur-Seine, France: Édition Action Poétique (in French and English), 2007. [Published on the occasion of the solo exhibition Hodibis Potax, by Eduardo Kac, realized in the context of Biennale des Poètes en Val-de-Marne (Poetry Biennial, France), May 2007.]
- Eduardo Kac: Histoire Naturelle de L'Enigma et Autres Travaux / Eduardo Kac: Natural History of the Enigma and Other Works. Poitiers, France: Al Dante Éditions (in French and English), 2009. ["Ouvrage conçu & par les éditions Al Dante à l'occasion de l'exposition énonyme au centre d'art comtemporain Rurart... en partenariat avec l'espace Mendes France (centre de culture scientifique) de 8 octobre au 20 decembre 2009." / "Book edition designed by Al Dante on the occasion of the eponymous exhibition at Rurart Contemporary Art Center ... in partnership with Espace Mendes France (Center of Science and Culture,) from October 8 to December 20, 2009."] Additional publication information quoted from the title page of this catalogue.

Books about the art of Eduardo Kac

- Rossi, Elena Giulia (ed.). "Eduardo Kac : Move 36". Filigranes Éditions, Paris (in French and English), 2005, ISBN 2-35046-012-6.
- The Eighth Day: The Trangenic Art of Eduardo Kac, eds. Sheilah Britton and Dan Collins. Tempe, Arizona: The Institute for Studies in the Arts, Arizona State University, 2003. ISBN 0-9724291-0-7.
- Azoulay, Gérard (ed.). Télescope intérieur. Observatoire de l'espace/CNES (in French and English), 2021, ISBN 978-2-85440-046-5.
