= New media art journals =

Academic journals on the topic of new media art

New media art journals are academic journals covering the topic of new media art. They can be published in physical or online format and typically include original research, interviews, and information about books, events and exhibitions that incorporate technology in the arts.

== Austria ==
- Electronic Journal Literatur Primär is a German language online journal that offers essays and theoretical contributions on the themes of new media culture and communication.

== France ==
- Magazine des Cultures Digitales (MCD) is a print and digital magazine in French and in English. It was started in 2003 focusing on electronic music and gradually expanded to cover digital arts.

== Germany ==
- Netzspannung.org is a German online journal and platform for media art that is also in English that is by Fraunhofer MARS - Exploratory Media Lab and was initiated by Monika Fleischmann and Wolfgang Strauss. It covers media art research, tele-lectures, and eculture. It is supported by the Bundesministerium fuer Bildung und Forschung, the Fraunhofer Institute for Intelligent Analysis and Information Systems, and its MARS exploratory media lab. The platform has been online since September 2001. The "netzspannung.org/journal" is an editorial module of the netzspannung.org Internet platform.

== International ==
- Interartive functions as an online monthly journal and as a cultural association that carries out projects off-line.

== Spain ==
- a mínima is a printed magazine on present-day art and new media that documents the work of artists and researchers interested in the involvement of science and technology in art and culture (text in English and Spanish).
- Artnodes is an online academic journal on new media art and the intersections of art, science and technology. It publishes articles focused in their aesthetics, theories, histories and practices both in English, Spanish and Catalan.

== UK ==
- Hidrazone is an academic, online journal for new media art research based at Southampton Solent University. According to its mission statement, it 'provides a space for practitioners and writers in the field of digital and interactive arts' and 'seeks to encourage practical and theoretical research into a wide variety of digital art such as net art, interactive art, software art, digital painting, and computational video'. Its modus operandi is a use of theme-based editions.

== United States ==
- Leonardo is an international peer-reviewed journal on the use of contemporary science and technology in the arts and music, founded in 1968.
- Switch is the new media art journal of the CADRE Laboratory for New Media of the School of Art and Design at San Jose State University. It has been published online since 1995.
- e-flux is an information portal. Its 'about' informs us that is a New York-based information bureau dedicated to world wide distribution of information for contemporary visual arts institutions via the Internet. Established in January 1999.
- media-N is the online, peer reviewed and invitational journal of College Arts Association New Media Caucus. It has been published since fall 2005.
- Digitalartimag is an online new media art journal only in English with some news and interviews.
