= Derrick de Kerckhove =

Canadian author and professor (born 1944)

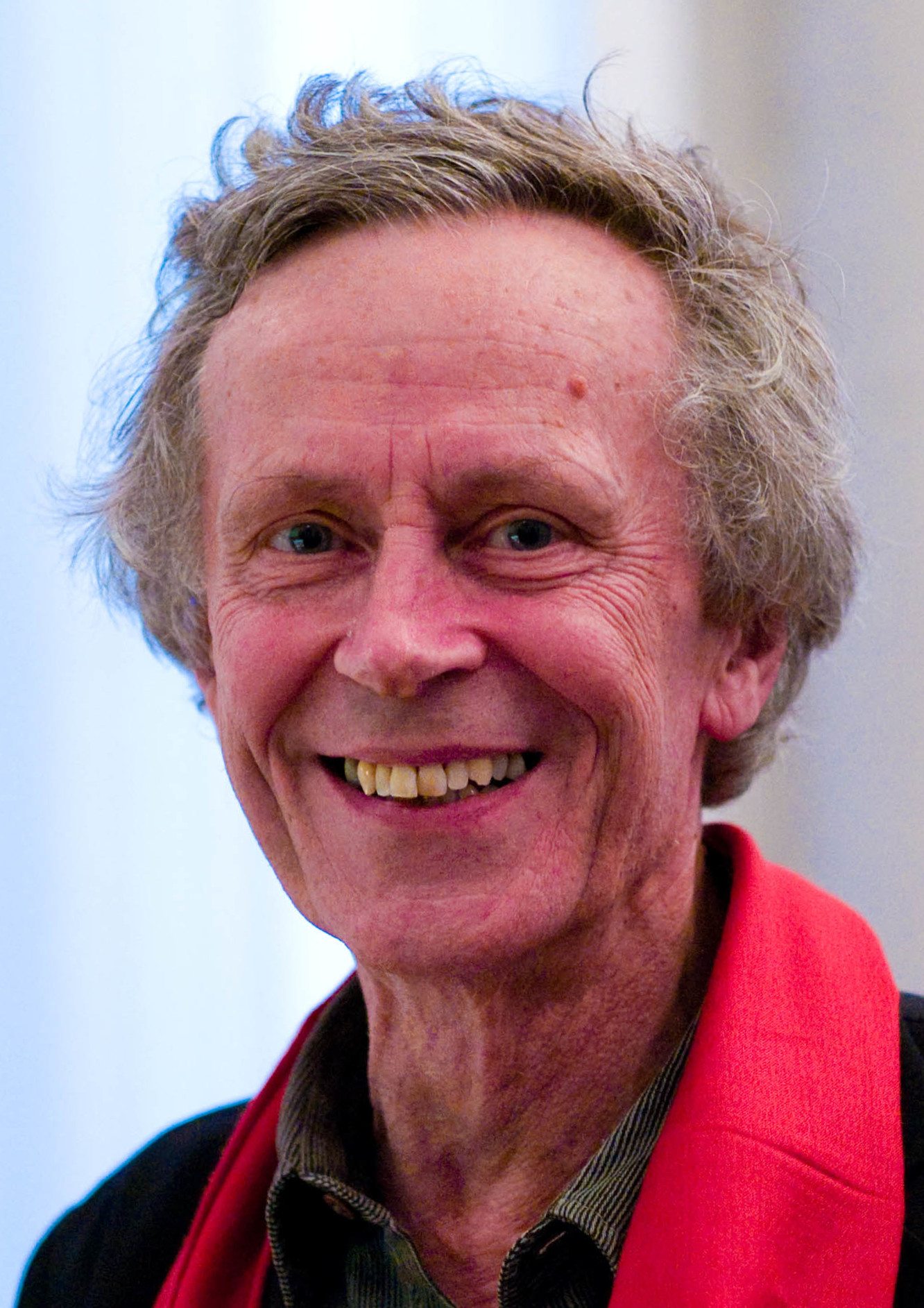
- de Kerckhove in 2018
- Born: 1944 (age 81–82)
- Education: University of Toronto (Ph.D., 1975); University of Tours (Doctorat du 3e cycle, Sociology of Art, 1979)
- Occupations: Author, professor, academic

Derrick de Kerckhove (born 1944) is the author of The Skin of Culture and Connected Intelligence and Professor in the Department of French at the University of Toronto, in Toronto, Ontario, Canada. He was the Director of the McLuhan Program in Culture and Technology from 1983 until 2008.

In January 2007, he returned to Italy for the project and Fellowship "Rientro dei cervelli", in the Faculty of Sociology at the University of Naples Federico II where he teaches "Sociologia della cultura digitale" and "Marketing e nuovi media". He was invited to return to the Library of Congress for another engagement in the Spring of 2008. He is research supervisor for the PhD Planetary Collegium M-node directed by Francesco Monico. Since 2008, he oversees global art projects for Solstizio, co-founded by the artist Giuseppe Stampone.

In July 2015, along with Fred Forest, Maurice Benayoun, Tom Klinkowstein and other artist, thinkers and philosophers, he participated in Natan Karczmar's seminar ArtComTec.

He is also Italian citizen.

== Background ==
De Kerckhove received his Ph.D in French Language and Literature from the University of Toronto in 1975 and a Doctorat du 3e cycle in Sociology of Art from the university of Tours (France) in 1979. He was an associate of the Centre for Culture and Technology from 1972 to 1980, and worked with Marshall McLuhan for over ten years as translator, assistant and co-author.

== Publications ==
He edited Understanding 1984 (UNESCO, 1984) and co-edited with Amilcare Iannucci, McLuhan e la metamorfosi dell'uomo (Bulzoni, 1984) two collections of essays on McLuhan, culture, technology and biology. He also co-edited with Charles Lumsden The Alphabet and the Brain (Springer Verlag, 1988), a book which scientifically assesses the impact of the Western alphabet on the physiology and the psychology of human cognition. Another publication, La civilisation vidéo-chrétienne appeared in France in December 1990 and in Italy the following year (Feltrinelli, 1991).

Brainframes: Technology, Mind and Business (Bosch & Keuning, 1991) addresses the differences between the effects of television, computers and hypermedia on corporate culture, business practices and economic markets. The Skin of Culture (Somerville Press, 1995) is a collection of essays on the new electronic reality which stayed on Canadian best-sellers lists for several months. It was translated into a dozen languages including Japanese, Chinese, Korean, Polish and Slovenian.

Connected Intelligence (Somerville, 1997) introduced his research on new media and cognition. His latest book, The Architecture of Intelligence, was first issued in Dutch in December 2000, and in English (June 2001), Italian and German in September 2001. It was later translated into Spanish, Portuguese and Japanese. He collaborated with Mark Federman on McLuhan for Managers: New Tools for New Thinking, published in September 2003. De Kerckhove is also contracted to work on a book about the history of stage performance from early Greek theatre to modern Opera, in collaboration with Francesco Monico.

== Other works ==
The Point of Being co-edited with Cristina Miranda de Almeida. This book explores the research question: what are the psycho-physiological dimensions of the ways people experience their presence in the world and the world's presence in them? There is in all chapters an invitation to experience a shift of perception. An embodied sensation of the world and a re-sensorialization of the environment are described to complement the visually-biased perspective with a renewed sense of humans’ relationship to their spatial and material surrounding. As such, this book presents the topological reunion of sensation and cognition, of sense and sensibility and of body, self and world. The perception of the "Point of Being", to which the various chapters of this book invite the reader, proposes an alternative to the "Point of View" inherited from the Renaissance; it offers a way to situate the sense of self through the physical, digital and electronic domains that shape physical, social, cultural, economic and spiritual conditions at the beginning of the twenty-first century. Nine authors explore different ways in which the paradigm of the Point of Being can bridge the interval, the discontinuity, between subjects and objects that began with the diffusion of the phonetic alphabet. The Point of Being is a signpost on that journey.

== Other works ==
- Since 2008 he oversees global art projects for Solstizio, co-founded by the Italian artist Giuseppe Stampone.
- The Augmented Mind, 40k, ebook edition (English | Italian), (2011)
