= René Berger =

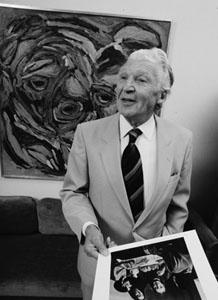
Berger between 1982 and 1992

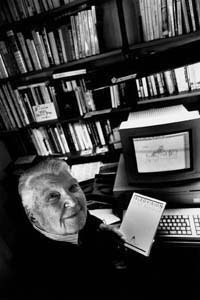
Berger between 1982 and 1992

René Berger (April 29, 1915 – January 29, 2009) was a Swiss writer, philosopher and a historian of art.

== Titles ==
- "Docteur ès lettres" of the University of Paris (Sorbonne)
- Honorary professor at the University of Lausanne and the École des Beaux-Arts.
- Former Director-Curator of the Musée des Beaux-Arts.
- Honorary President of the International Association of Art Critics (AICA) and the International Association for Video in the Arts and Culture (AIVAC).
- Founder of the cultural movement Pour l'Art.
- Originator-producer of the Colloquia of the International Video Festival of Locarno.
- Consulting expert to UNESCO and the Council of Europe.
- Member of the Kuratorium of the Zentrum für Kunst und Medientechnologie (ZKM Karlsruhe).
- Member of the Academy of the International Centre of Contemporary Art, Chateau de Beychevelle (GMF Group, France, Suntory Group, Japan).

== Select publications ==
- Découverte de la peinture (1958, reedited in 1969)
- Connaissance de la peinture (1963)
- Art et communication (1972)
- La mutation des signes (1972)
- La téléfission, alerte à la télévision (1976)
- L'effet des changements technologiques (1983)
- Jusqu'où ira votre ordinateur? L'imaginaire programmé (1987)
- Téléovision, le nouveau Golem (1991)
- L'origine du futur (1996)
- René Berger. L'art vidéo, François Bovier, Adeena Mey (eds.) (2014)

Several of those have been translated into English, German, Italian, Spanish, Portuguese, Hungarian, Romanian, Arabic and Japanese.

Berger made numerous contributions to magazines and reviews. He also produced radio and television programs. He participated regularly in many international conferences, congresses. juries, seminars and colloquia. Berger pursued research in new technologies as they relate to our emerging technoculture.

He won numerous international awards, among them the Golden Laser (Locarno, 1987) and the Picasso Medal (UNESCO, 1989).

Berger was the father of Jacques-Édouard Berger, who predeceased him in 1993 and in whose memory he established the Jacques-Édouard Berger Foundation.
