= Kazimierz Karczmarz =

Kazimierz Karczmarz (7 May 1933 – 20 July 2011) was a Polish botanist, bryologist, university teacher, long-time head of the Plant Systems Department of the Maria Curie-Skłodowska University, retired in 2003.

Between 1962 and 1971 he edited several exsiccatae, among others the series Musci Exsiccati Palatinatus Lublinensis - Polonia.

== Awards and decorations ==
- Knight's Cross of the Order of Polonia Restituta
- Gold Cross of Merit
- Medal of the Commission of National Education
- Hononary medals from Lublin Voivodship and Tarnobrzeg Voivodship
