= Centre for Culture and Technology (Toronto) =

Research centre at the University of Toronto

Coordinates: 43°39′52″N 79°23′23″W

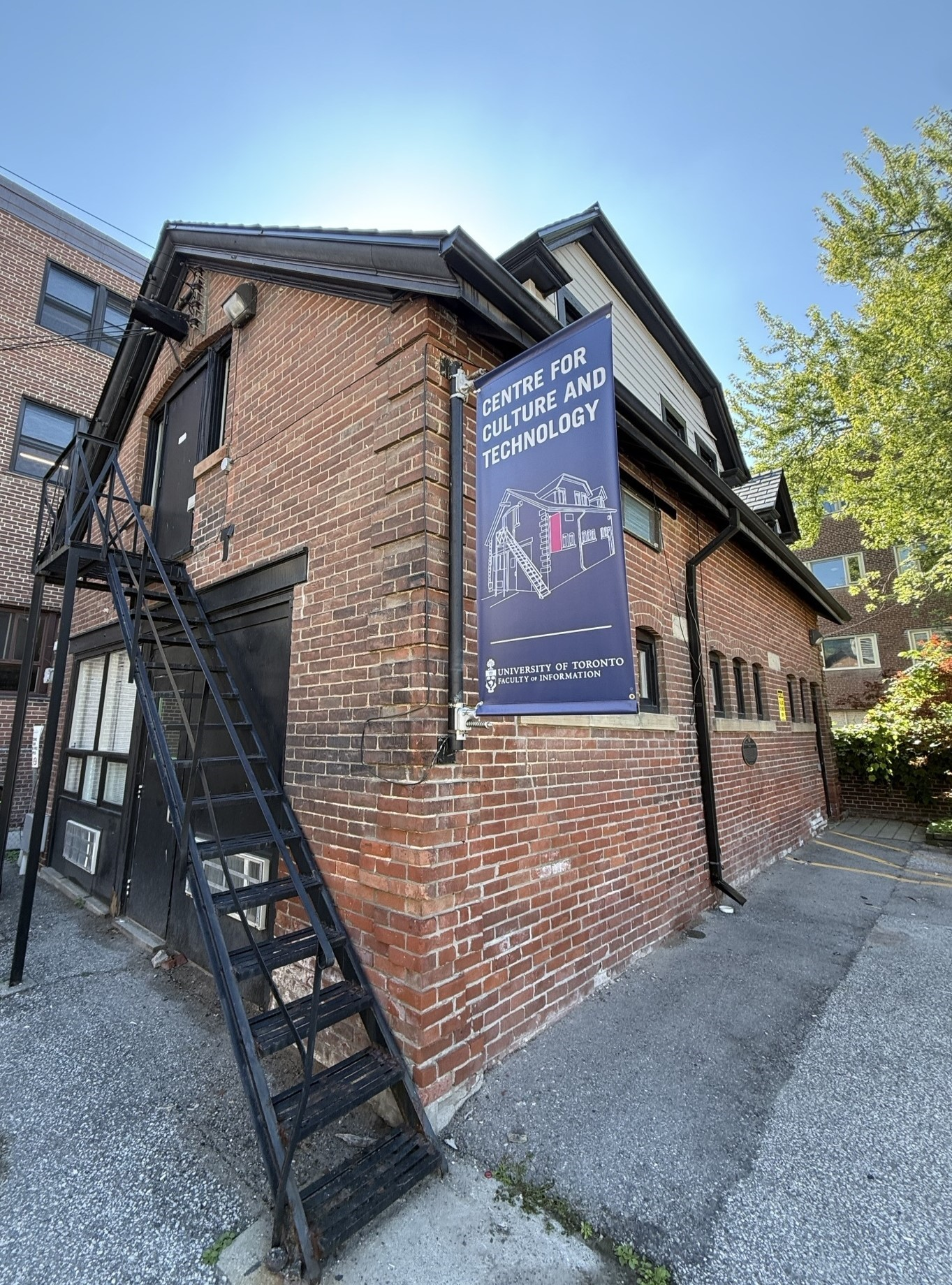
- The Coach House in Toronto
- Former names: McLuhan Centre for Culture and Technology
- Established: 1963; 63 years ago
- Parent institution: University of Toronto Faculty of Information
- Director: Scott C. Richmond
- Location: 39A Queens Park Crescent E, Toronto, Ontario, Canada
- Website: cultureandtech.utoronto.ca

The Centre for Culture and Technology is a research centre and extra-departmental unit of the University of Toronto Faculty of Information. In 1963, the centre started as a card pinned to the door of Marshall McLuhan's office in the English department of the Faculty of Arts and Science. In 1965, McLuhan draft Constitution for the centre read: "The Centre is established to advance the understanding of the origins and effects of technology" to "investigation into the psychic and social consequences of technologies." It hosted the former McLuhan Program in Culture and Technology which followed the Toronto school of communication theory.

== History ==
Initially the centre had no organized program for research or teaching, but gained in prestige from the worldwide popularity of Understanding Media (1964) and grew in McLuhan's last decade in Toronto, assisted by Derrick de Kerckhove and McLuhan's son Eric, who became a director of the McLuhan Program International.

In 1994, the McLuhan Program became a part of the University of Toronto's Faculty of Information. The program's curriculum is based on the works of Marshall McLuhan and other media theorists. The first director was literacy scholar and OISE Professor David R. Olsen. From 1983 until 2008, the McLuhan Program was under the direction of Derrick de Kerckhove who was McLuhan's student and translator. From 2008 through 2015 Professor Dominique Scheffel-Dunand of York University served as Director of the Program. In 2009, the faculty of information launched the Coach House Institute (CHI) as a clearly defined research unit under which the McLuhan Program in Culture and Technology now operates.

In 2011, at the time of his centenary, the Centre established a Marshall McLuhan Centenary Fellowship program in his honour, and each year appoints up to four fellows for a maximum of two years. In 2016 under the interim director, Seamus Ross (2015-2016), the institute received approval for its renaming as the McLuhan Centre for Culture and Technology in recognition of McLuhan's intellectual contributions. The McLuhan Program was subsumed under this centre. In 2017, Sarah Sharma, an Associate Professor of Media Theory, began a five-year term as director of the Centre (2017- ).

== Media experiments ==
Between the 1950s and the early 1960s, the centre conducted an experiment that compared the effectiveness of TV, radio, lectures and print in learning. The results were that the students retained more information from radio and television than they did from live lectures or printed material. The experiment was replicated by Roach, Aman, Appleton, Bellyea and Lips. And then by Williams, Paul and Ogilvie.

== See also ==
- Institute of Communication, Culture, Information and Technology
- List of academic units of the University of Toronto
