= Jacques-Édouard Berger =

Jacques-Édouard Berger (24 May 1945 – 10 November 1993) was a Swiss Egyptologist.

== Biography ==
Jacques-Édouard Berger was the son of the Swiss writer, philosopher, and art historian René Berger.

He received a BA from the University of Lausanne in 1969 and obtained an additional degree in Egyptology at the University of Geneva in 1973.

== Work ==
He held the positions of curator at the Cantonal Museum of Fine Arts in Lausanne and lecturer at the École Polytechnique Federale de Lausanne. He was a member of several international committees at the International Council of Museums and UNESCO.

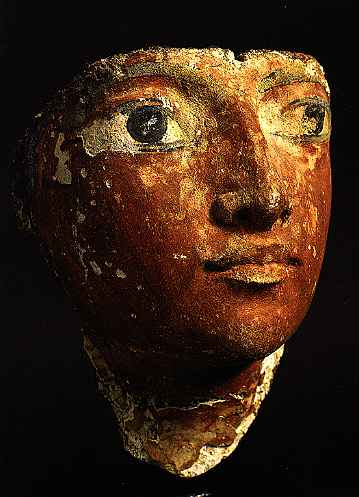
Sarcophagus mask (New Kingdom). J.-E. Berger Collection/MUDAC, Lausanne

== Jacques-Édouard Berger Foundation ==
The Jacques-Édouard Berger Foundation was created by a small group of relatives and friends in 1994, shortly after Berger's death. Its aim is to edit his entire works through a website named for him. The collection contains are more than 100,000 images (mainly slides), as well as recordings of Berger's lectures.

Since Berger's private collection has been placed at the Musée des arts décoratifs in Lausanne, Museum of Contemporary Design and Applied Arts (MUDAC), the Foundation was inaugurated with an exhibition there (November 17, 1995 – January 2, 1996).

== Publications ==
- L'œil et l'éternité : portraits romains d'Égypte, Flammarion, Paris, 1977
- El-Fayyum - I Segni dell'Uomo, Franco Maria Ricci, Milan, 1978 (French ed., 1985)
- Pierres d'Égypte, Éditions Pour l'Art, Lausanne, 1987
- Jacques-Édouard Berger, Un regard partagé, édition Fondation Jacques-Édouard Berger, 1995
- Philippe Germond, Le monde symbolique des amulettes égyptiennes, Édition des 5 Continents, Milan, 2005 (documents en provenance de la collection Jacques-Édouard Berger)
