= Natan Karczmar =

French artist (born 1933)

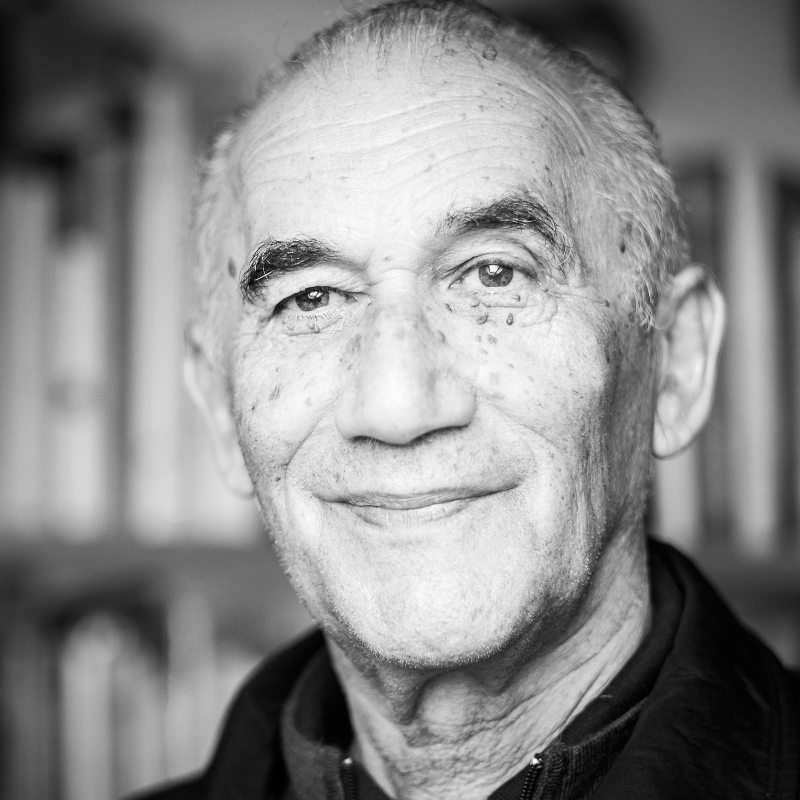
Natan Karczmar. Photography: Michael Wögerbauer

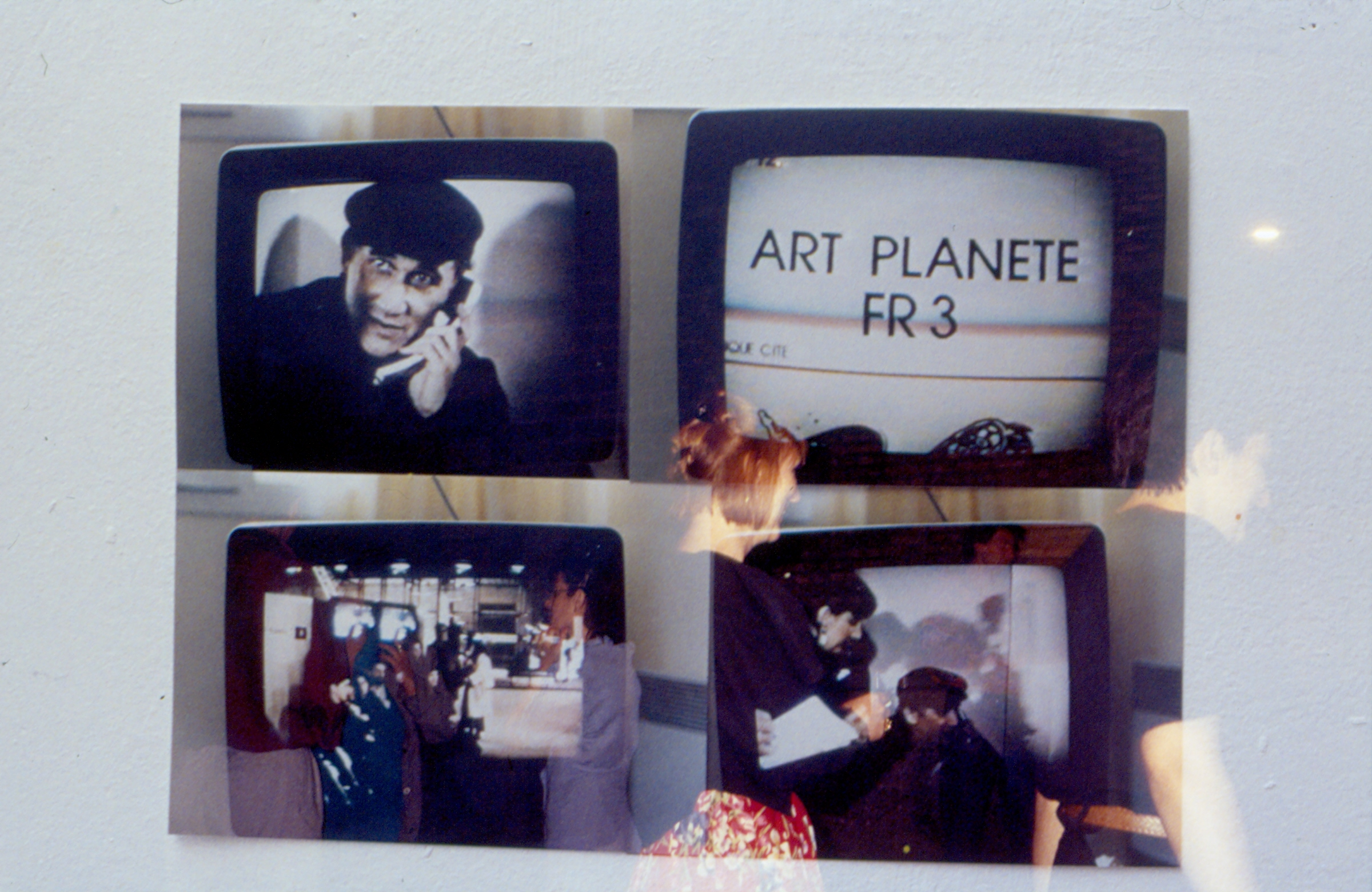
Natan Karczmar. Pavillon Art Planète. L'Europe des Créateurs. Grand Palais. Paris, 1989. Photography: Evgenia Demnievska

Natan Karczmar (born January 3, 1933) is a French cultural event promoter, book and magazine publisher, theater producer, photographer and painter.

Karczmar created many art installations, museum exhibitions and new types of cultural communication. He also published books and magazines that showcased the work of Canadian poets and sculptors. Karczmar also produced more than 100 plays in Montreal.

Karczmar organized numerous events in France and Israel to bring together artists and other creative people involved in communications and the arts.

== Career ==
=== 1950's – Israel and Canada ===
Between 1953 and 1954, Karczmar worked as a journalist for the French division of Kol Israel. Between 1952 and 1954, he also worked as a musical critic for the French daily L'Echo d'Israël.

In 1954, Karczmar organized an art film festival in Tel Aviv, Jerusalem, and Haifa. In 1956, after moving to Montreal, Quebec, he created the Canadian Museum of Film on Art and distributed its programs to forty Canadian cities.

In 1957, Karczmar started the theater of the Canadian Workshop Center at the Fine Art School of Montreal . He presented one hundred productions until 1964, combining theater, and one act plays, contemporary dance, poetry, and music. In 1958, he organized the Salon de la Jeune Peinture, sculpture and graphic arts.

=== 1960's – Canada ===
In 1960, Karczmar organized the Mexican Museum of Film on Art (Museo Mexicano de Peliculas sobre Arte), and in 1962, the American Institute of Film on Art.

While at the Canadian Workshop Center, Karczmar published several Cahiers d'Essai and created the Editions d'Essai. The published pieces included the poems J'ai choisi la mort by Guy Lafond, as well as Ballades du temps précieux by Pierre Perrault .

Karczmar also started the Editions Graph, which published albums by sculptors and printmakers from Quebec. They included Armand Vaillancourt, Albert Roussil, Anne Kahane, Marcel Braitstein, Roland Giguère, Léon Bellefleur, Stanley Lewis and André Montpetit. In 1967, Karczmar published the first book on Canadian sculpture at the Montreal World's Fair.

=== 1980s – Israel ===
In 1983, Karczmar organized "Installation Contact" (Mivne Maga) on Kings Square in Tel Aviv, then in Haifa at Beth Rotschild and at the Acco Theater Festival with many games of communication, including 24 telephones in a closed circuit.

In 1983, Karczmar started the Tel Aviv Street Theater showing his play The Sandclock (Noa's adventures). From 1982 to 1984, he also worked as an art critic for the weekly Réalités d'Israël

In 1984, Karczmar met Fred Forest who invited him to join the group of Aesthetics of Communication which gathers theoreticians and artists using various technologies to produce communication works, networks, performances and installations. Artists, theoreticians, philosophers, art critics and institutional officials that have contributed to Aesthetics of communication include : Philippe Quéau, Jean-Marc Philippe, Jacques Jaffelin, Michel Bret, Pierre Lévy, and countless others.

In 1984, Karczmar took part in the "L'immaginario tecnologico, Benevento, Museo del Sannio " curated by Mario Costa, and organized the Artcom Israel 1984 Symposium at the Israel Museum, Jerusalem, the Haifa Museum and Tzavta Center in Tel Aviv with Fred Forest and Antonio Muntadas as guest lecturers.

In 1989, Karczmar created the bimonthly Art Planet video magazine, which was distributed to 100 modern and contemporary art museums. Art Planet included the Interactive Museum, with remote visits to museum exhibitions using amplified telephone, video and slides. The first presentation of the Interactive Museum was in 1989 at the Art Planet Pavillon with the collaboration of the French FR3 broadcasting station, at the Grand Palais, in Paris, during L'Europe des Créateurs event. Interactive Museum events were also held in 1992 at the UNESCO International Council of Museums congress in Quebec.

=== 1990s – France ===
From 1992 until 1994, Karczmar directed the Art/Communication/New Technologies Seminar at Université Européenne de la Recherche, at the Ministère de la Recherche, in Paris.

In April 1996, Karczmar founded Artmag, the first Internet art magazine on Internet to present temporary museum and gallery exhibitions around the world.

=== 2000s ===
In 2007 Karczmar staged ArtComTec Seminars were held at the Chapelle des Recollets in Paris.

In July 2015 Karczmar directed ArtComTec videoconferencing seminars in the framework of ArtCamp at the Ladislav Sutnar Faculty of Design and Art University of West Bohemia, Plzen.

In 2007, with Jean-Pierre Faye and Anguéliki Garidis,, Karczmar organized the Centre Averroès-Maïmonides devoted to the Judeo-Muslim dialog and produces visioconferences between Paris and Israeli institutions having inter-community cultural activities.

== Artist ==
=== Painter and photographer ===
From 1969, Karczmar devotes himself to painting and shows non-objective works in 1970 at Galerie Entremonde in Paris and at the Center Art Gallery in New-York. His artistic demarche included also photography and lithography, in particular photomontages. Until 1983, he had shows in Canada, USA, Europe and Israel.

=== Video collectives and Installations ===
- November 1984, in Israel, organized the first Collective and Simultaneous Video Event between a radio station and the videomakers.
- 1985, in Salerno, Italy, he organized a video event within "Artmedia" directed by Mario Costa at Salerno University.
- 1986, in Salerno ARTMEDIA II with the installation and video action " Investig'Action".
- 1986 Artcom Paris at École nationale supérieure des Beaux-Arts de Paris. Co-organized with Fred Forest
- 1986 Artcom Cologne with Wolfgang Ziemer
- 1987, video twinning between Lille, Cologne, Liège, Asch-sur-Alzette and Grenoble. Part of the European Year of Environment with participation of 60 videomakers.
- In 1988, participated in Transinteractifs with the presentation "Transintercaricatures » between Paris and Toronto.
- 1988 organized videocollective event " Vive la Tour" for the Centennial of the Tour Eiffel with the collaboration of Antenne 2 Broadcasting station, France Inter and France Info radio stations. He participates to a video installation Paris-Cologne at " Worauf Warten Sie " at Fermate at Alter Wartesaal in Cologne.
- In 1990 Cambridge, Massachusetts, participates in Arttransition at the Center for Advanced Visual Studies (CAVS) at M.I.T.
- 1992 Paris, participates in the International Symposium "L'Europe de la Deuxième Renaissance"

=== Relationnism ===
At the occasion of the launching of Art Planet in 1989 at the Grand Palais in Paris during L'Europe des Créateurs, he publishes a text describing his actions and those of other artists, presenting them as « Relationnism ». He distinguishes it thus from Aesthetics of Communication which privileges the medium, the container, rather than the content of communicational actions and events while Relationnism grants an equal importance to the container and the content. The attention is given as much to the technological medium than to the content in the creation of communicational works and in art of communication.

=== Funface ===
In the framework of the Festival Vidéoformes 2013, Natan Karczmar updated at the Corum Saint-Jean in Clermont-Ferrand the exhibition presented in 1983 at the Installation Contact produced at the Kings of Israel Square in Tel Aviv (now Rabin Square). Portraits on the themes of the smile, the wink, and grimaces were taken, projected and put online on the site

== Retrospective ==
In, 2004, a commemoration of the fiftieth anniversary of the first festival of film on art held in 1954 was organized at the Tel Aviv and Jerusalem Cinematheques.

In 2007, a commemoration of the fiftieth anniversary of the creation of the Centre Canadien d'Essai was organized with the collaboration if six Maisons de la Culture in Montréal. In this framework, 2 visioconferences are held with the cooperation of the Canadian Cultural Center in Paris and la Maison de la Culture of Notre-Dame-de-Grâce in Montréal.

In 2009, a retrospective was organized at the occasion of the 25th anniversary of "Videocollectives" at the International Vidéoformes Festival in Clermont-Ferrand as well as in five Israeli cinematheques (Tel Aviv, Jerusalem, Haifa, Rosh-Pina, Sderot). A retrospective of Video collectives was also presented at the International Traces de Vie festival in Clermont-Ferrand.

== Bibliography ==
- Sculpture Canadienne à l'Expo 67 – Canadian Sculpture at Expo 67, author-publisher: Natan Karczmar, Éditions graph.
- Artcom Israël 1984, texts Fred Forest, Mario Costa, Natan Karczmar
- Artmedia, Opera universitaria di Salerno, rassegna internationale di estetic del video e della comunicazione, 1985
- Artcom Paris 86, Rencontres et performances sur l'esthétique de la communication, École nationale supérieure des Beaux-Arts de Paris.
- Vidéo 6e, collective and simultaneous video event by Natan Karczmar, École nationale supérieure des Beaux-Arts de Paris, texts by Derrick de Kerkhove and Fred Forest.
- Frank Popper, L'Art à l'âge électronique, 1997.
- Special Edition "Artmedia VIII, From Aesthetics of Communication to Net Art , Artpress, December 2002.
- Les Transinteractifs, Actes du colloque sur la Transinteractivité, Centre culturel Canadien, 4–5 novembre, 1988, éd. D. de Kerckhove and Christian Sevette, Paris.
- Vers une culture de l'interactivité, collection "Déchiffrages", directed by Frank Popper, Espace SNVB International.
- Fred Forest, Art et Internet, Imaginaire : Mode d'emploi, Éditions Cercle d'Art 2008.
