= Fred Forest =

French artist (1933–2026)

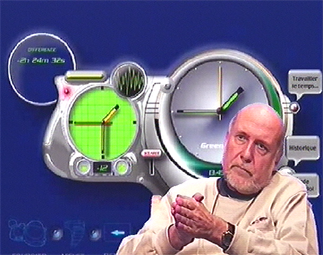
- Forest in 1995
- Born: 6 July 1933; Mascara, French Algeria
- Died: 4 November 2026 (aged 93)
- Occupation: Media artist
- Years active: Early 1960s–2026

Fred Forest (6 July 1933 – 4 November 2026) was a French new media artist who made use of video, photography, the printed press, mail, radio, television, telephone, telematics, and the internet in a wide range of installations, performances, and public interventions that explore both the ramifications and potential of media space. He was a co-founder of both the Sociological Art Collective (1974) and the Aesthetics of Communication movement (1983).

Forest took part in the Biennale of Venice (1976) and the Documenta of Kassel (1977, 1987) and his work won awards at the São Paulo Art Biennial (1973) and the Festival of Electronic Arts of Locarno (1995). In 2004, Forest's archives, including his video works, were added to the collection of the Institut national de l'audiovisuel of France. A retrospective of his work was held at the Slought Foundation in Philadelphia in 2007.

The holder of a state doctorate in the humanities from the Sorbonne (his 1985 thesis committee included Abraham Moles, Frank Popper, and Jean Duvignaud), Forest also taught on the faculty of the Ecole Nationale Supérieure d'Art, Cergy-Pontoise; the University of Paris, Panthéon-Sorbonne; and the University of Nice, Sophia-Antipolis. He is the author of numerous books on art, communication, and technology including Pour un art actuel: l'art à l'heure d’Internet (1998, For an Art of Today: Art in the Internet Age), Fonctionnements et dysfonctionnements de l’art contemporain (2000, The Inner Workings and Dysfunctionality of Contemporary Art), and L’œuvre-système invisible (2006, The Invisible System Work).

Aside from his artworks, which are often imbedded in the mass media and use publicity as a raw material, Forest was known in France as a fierce critic of the contemporary art establishment—a critical stance that led him to take the Musée National d'Art Moderne (Centre Georges Pompidou) to court (1994–97) over its refusal to disclose the purchase prices of recent acquisitions. He was also one of the founders of the French Fête de l’Internet, or Internet Fest.

== Beginnings ==
Forest was born on 6 July 1933 in Mascara, French Algeria. A self-taught artist whose formal education ended after primary school (he was later authorized to present a doctoral thesis under special provisions), Forest worked for fifteen years as a postal service employee, first in Algeria and then in France, before deciding to devote himself exclusively to artistic pursuits. In the early 1960s, he worked as an illustrator for the French newspapers Combat and Les Echos and experimented with the projection of moving and still images on tableaux-écrans, or screen-paintings. Having received a Sony CV-2400 Portapak video recorder in 1967 as part of a promotional campaign by Sony France. He was one of the first artists to experiment with video. Forest's first experimental video tapes, The Telephone Booth and The Wall of Arles date from 1967. His first formal exhibition of video art, "Interrogation 69," an interactive video installation, took place in May 1969 in the city of Tours.

Influenced by the political and cultural ferment of May 68, Situationist critiques of the society of spectacle, Marshall McLuhan's writings, Umberto Eco's concept of the "open work," and the avant-garde's proclaimed goal of breaking down the barrier between art and everyday life, Forest stopped producing traditional art objects in 1969 and focused instead on a utopian form of "social praxis" operating "under the cover of art." Because of its portability, low-fi aesthetic, immediacy, and potential for interactive feedback, video was the tool of choice for such experimental social praxis; however, Forest also became interested in the mass media at an early stage in his career. His first major series of works with the mass media was the "Space-Media" project of 1972, which included a small "parasitic" blank square ("150 cm2 of Newspaper") published in the 12 January 1972 edition of the daily Le Monde, which the readers were encouraged to mail back to Forest, filled in with commentary, creative writing, or artwork of their own. "Space-Media" was the subject of a major article by the philosopher and new media theorist Vilém Flusser, with whom Forest collaborated throughout his career.

== Sociological art ==
In 1974, Forest joined forces with Hervé Fischer and Jean-Paul Thénot to form the Collectif d’Art Sociologique (disbanded in 1979). The members of the Collective were invited to represent France at the 76th Biennale of Venice by Pierre Restany, who became a lifelong friend and supporter of Forest and his work.

Forest's video and video-based installation and performance works from this period include "Gestures in Work and Social Life" (1972–74), "Electronic Investigation of Rue Guénégaud" (1973), "Senior Citizen Video" (1973), "Video Portrait of a Collector in Real Time" (1974), "Restany Dines at La Coupole" (1974), "TV Shock, TV Exchange" (1975), "Madame Soleil Exhibited in the Flesh" (1975), and "The Video Family" (1976).

In 1973, Forest was awarded the grand prize in communication at the 12th Bienal do São Paulo for a series of provocative actions that included a mock street demonstration featuring marchers carrying blank placards, interactive experiments in the press, and a multimedia installation with an uncensored telephone call-in center. These actions elicited the attention and displeasure of Brazil's military regime and Forest was detained by the political police, released only after the French Embassy intervened on his behalf.

Forest's actions throughout the 1970s and beyond took aim at cultural as well as political power structures. This included the contemporary art establishment, whose perceived lack of imagination, corporatist logic, arcane traditions, star system, and speculative practices he lampooned in works like "The Artistic M^{2}" (1977). For this project, Forest formed a certified real estate development company and placed ads in the national and international press announcing his plans to sell "artistic" square-meters of land—small plots of undeveloped land near the Franco-Swiss border. The ads prompted a police real estate fraud investigation and authorities intervened to halt the sale of the first square-meter plot at a public auction alongside a number of contemporary paintings and sculptures. At the last minute, Forest substituted the tiny plot of land with a square-meter piece of common cloth that had been trampled by the auction attendees as they crossed the threshold and this officially "non artistic" square meter of cloth fetched a usually high price of 6,500 Francs at the auction—thanks, no doubt, to the publicity Forest's action and the police investigation had attracted. At the auction's conclusion, Pierre Restany publicly declared that Forest's m^{2} was indeed a bona fide work of art.

Through actions such as the São Paulo experiments and the "Artistic M^{2}" operation, Forest can be considered a precursor of such current counter-cultural practices as tactical media, culture jamming, and hacktivism.

== Aesthetics of communication ==
Although the social and political concerns first developed within the framework of Sociological Art remained strong in his work until the end, in the 1980s, Forest became increasingly interested in the "immanent realities" of electronic and networked communication—for instance, issues of space, time, the body, knowledge, and identity. He faulted contemporary art for having largely ignored these means of communication, which had transformed everyday life and added an entirely new dimension to reality: the virtual space of information and communication, which Forest likened to new territory "dredged from the void." In order to promote artistic research into the sensory, cognitive, psychological, symbolic, aesthetic, spiritual, and social properties of electronic telecommunications media, Forest and Professor Mario Costa of the University of Salerno formed the International Research Group for the Aesthetics of Communication in 1983. They were joined by the media theorist Derrick de Kerckhove, Director of the McLuhan Program in Culture and Technology at the University of Toronto, and a wide array of artists including many of the pioneers of telecommunications and telematic art. Among those affiliated with the group at some point were Robert Adrian X, Roy Ascott, Stéphan Barron, Jean-Pierre Giavonelli, Eric Gidney, Natan Karczmar, Tom Klinkowstein, Mit Mitopoulos, Antoni Muntadas, David Rokeby, Christian Sevette, Norman White, and Horacio Zabala.

Forest himself was the author of the group's manifesto, "For an Aesthetics of Communication," published in 1985. This text laid out his vision of the meta-communicational artwork, whose goal is not to convey any particular message or imagery, but to create experimental micro-environments of communication in which certain salient, normally hidden features of the media themselves may be discovered. This usually involves the artist's conception of special media configurations of their own, composed of different elements of existing media deviated from their normal uses. The work is created by the users of system; it emerges from their consciousness-raising interaction with the system and each other. The artist's role is that of an "architect of information."

Forest's own meta-communicational artworks fall into three broad categories. The first involves media performances that are somewhat like technological versions of the koans that Zen masters ask their students in order to elicit sudden flashes of insight into existence and surrounding reality. In Forest's case, such works often focus on altered perceptual realities of time and space in the media environment. Notable examples include "Immediate Intervention" (1983), "Here and Now" (1983), "Electronic Blue, In Homage to Yves Klein" (1984), "Celebration of the Present" (1985), and "The Broken Vase" (1985). Another type of work involves whimsical exercises in telepresence and long-distance agency. Examples include "Telephonic Rally" (1986) and "Telephonic Faucet (1992), in which people contributed to filling a bucket in a Turin exhibition hall by turning on a faucet electronically triggered by their local and long-distance phone calls. Finally, there is a series of ambitious works that present alternative interfaces to the existing media and solicit public participation on a large scale. Examples include "The Stock Exchange of the Imaginary" (1982), "The Press Conference of Babel" (1983), "Learn to Watch T.V. by Listening to Your Radio" (1984), "In Search of Julia Margaret Cameron" (1986), and "Zenaide and Charlotte Take the Media by Storm" (1988). "The Press Conference of Babel" involved a multimedia installation that was also the set and makeshift studio of a pirate radio broadcast of expert analysis and public opinion over the broadcast of a leading French news interview program.

As the preceding example suggests, Forest's works of this period were by no means devoid of political implications. Other examples include his installation of LED message boards juxtaposing Bible verses and Gulf War news dispatches ("The Electronic Bible and the Gulf War," 1991), his public campaign for the presidency of Bulgarian National Television ("For a Utopian and Nervous Television," 1991), and his broadcasting of peace messages into the former Yugoslavia via radio and loudspeakers mounted on towers near the border ("The Watchtowers of Peace," 1993).

== Web art ==
With its multimedia capabilities, the opportunities it provides to bypass traditional art venues and to take interactive projects directly to a broader public, its rapid and profound impact on contemporary society and culture, and the mythical aura of cyberspace and the virtual, the Internet was naturally appealing to an artist of Forest's interests and practices. His first work utilizing the Internet, "From Casablanca to Locarno," a multimedia public participation redubbing of certain famous scenes from the Humphrey Bogart-Ingrid Bergman classic, was created in 1995. In 1996, Forest's web-based digital work "Network-Parcel" was sold at a public auction carried live on the Internet—the first event of its kind.

Forest went on to create a number of important online works including "Time Out" (1998, for the inaugural Fête de l’Internet), "The Time Processing Machine" (1998), "The Techno-Wedding" (1999), "The Center of the World" (1999), "Territorial Outings" (2001), "Networked Color" (2000), "Meat: The Territory of the Body and the Networked Body" (2002), "Memory Pictures" (2005), "The Digital Street Corner" (2005), and "Biennale 3000" (2006). Many of these works are concerned with developing new anthropological models for a world in which both individual and community have had to deal with the dual effects of dematerialization and deterritorialization, processes accelerated by the new digital technologies of networked communication. Some of the works literally constitute rites of passage. This is certainly true of "The Techno-Wedding," a collaborative project of Forest and fellow digital media artist Sophie Lavaud. The work was in fact the real-life wedding of Forest and Lavaud, which was webcast live alongside a virtual reality variant of the ceremony. Another example is to be found in "The Center of the World," which offered the public an opportunity to make a physical or telepresent pilgrimage to a shrine-like installation containing a digital relic of the old territorially centered world.

Beginning in 2008, Forest launched a new series of performances in the environment of Second Life. The first in the series, "The Experimental Research Center of the Territory" (2008) is in continuity with a lifelong exploration of the notion of territory beginning with "The Artistic M^{2}" (1977) and continuing through "The Territory of the M^{2}" (1980, a simulated independent state on the grounds of Forest's property in the town of Anserville, near Paris) and "The Networked Territory" (1996, a hypertext work that Forest considered the Territory's transposition into cyberspace). Each Second Life work is adapted somewhat to the physical location in which it is presented (Nice, São Paulo, New York, Beirut, etc.). In addition to staging debates and discussions at a think tank for avatars and offering public access to a mystical disintegrator of trash, some of the Second Life performances center on the philosophical musings and personal confessions of Forest's digital alter ego, Ego Cyberstar.

== Later activities ==
Forest's later work continued to demonstrate his critical approach to contemporary art and society as well as his commitment to exploring the anthropological, sensory, and philosophical ramifications of life in media space. Examples include "The Traders’ Ball" (2010), which examined the implications of the 2008 financial crisis through an online performance in Second Life coupled with an installation at the Lab Gallery in New York; "Ebb and Flow: The Internet Cave" (2011), a multimedia environment in Albi, France, which allowed visitors to encounter their own digital shadows in a cave-like setting reminiscent of Plato’s famous allegory from The Republic; and an unauthorized protest performance at the site of the Centre Pompidou’s Video Vintage exhibition in 2012 (Forest had himself bound from head to toe in old Portapak videotape and then invited members of the public to cut him free while he offered his critique of the institutional memory of early video art). In 2012 performance at the MoMA The conversation. In 2013, Forest was treated to his first-ever major retrospective in France: Fred Forest, homme-média no. 1 (Fred Forest, No. 1 Media Man), held at the Centre des Arts in Enghien-les-Bains, outside Paris. "Soirée Nomade " Fondation Cartier pour l'art contemporain. In 2014 performance at the Moma " Sociological walk with Google glass ". In 2015 exhibition at Jeu de Paume Paris " Sharingmédia ". ZKM and Adk Berlin " Flusser and The arts ".

In July 2015 with Derrick de Kerckhove, Maurice Benayoun, Tom Klinkowstein and other art people, thinkers and philosophers, he participated in Natan Karczmar's seminar ArtComTec.

== Death ==
Fred Forest died on 4 November 2026, at the age of 93.

== Bibliography ==
- Ascott, Roy and Carl Eugene Loeffler, eds. Connectivity: Art and Interactive Telecommunications. Special issue of Leonardo, 24.2(1991). Articles by Derrick de Kerckhove, Mario Costa, and Fred Forest.
- Costa, Mario. Il sublime tecnologico. Salerno: Edisud, 1990.
- ---. L'estetica della comunicazione: sull'uso estetico della simultaneità a distanza. Rome: Castelvecchi, 1999.
- Fischer, Hervé. Théorie de l'art sociologique. Paris: Casterman, 1977.
- Flusser, Vilém. "L'espace communicant: l'expérience de Fred Forest." Communication et langages. 18(1973): 80-92.
- Forest, Fred. Art Sociologique Vidéo: dossier Fred Forest. Paris: 10/18, 1977.
- ---. "La famille vidéo: art sociologique." Communication et langages. 33(1977): 85-102.
- ---. "La bourse de l'imaginaire." Communication et langages. 55(1983): 86-95.
- ---. "Manifeste pour une esthétique de la communication," + ‒ 0, 43 (Oct. 1985): 7-16; English trans., "For an Aesthetics of Communication," 17-24.
- ---. "Communication Esthetics, Interactive Participation and Artistic Systems of Communication and Expression." Design Issues. 4.1/2(1988): 97-115.
- ---, "Cent actions Art sociologique Esthétique de la communication, Nice, Z'Editions, 1995.
- ---. Pour un art actuel: l’art à l’heure d’Internet. Paris: L’Harmattan, 1998.
- ---. Fonctionnement et dysfonctionnement de l’art contemporain. Paris: L’Harmattan, 2000.
- ---. Repenser l'art et son enseignement: Les écoles de la vie. Paris: L'Harmattan, 2002.
- ---. De l’art vidéo au Net art. Paris: L’Harmattan, 2004. An illustrated catalog of Forest's work with critical essays.
- ---. L’œuvre-système invisible. Paris: L’Harmattan, 2006.
- ---. Art et Internet. Paris: Cercle d'art, 2008.
- Forest, Fred and Michael Leruth. "Interview avec Fred Forest: Braconnier des espaces virtuels de l’information." Part I, "Dépasser l’art contemporain." Contemporary French and Francophone Studies, 10.3 (Sept. 2006): 275-289. Part II, "Réaliser l’événement utopique." Contemporary French and Francophone Studies, 10.4 (Dec. 2006): 397-409.
- Forest Fred and Pierre Moeglin. "Regardez la TV avec votre radio." Communication et langages. 64(1985): 100-112.
- Galland, Blaise. Art sociologique: méthode pour une sociologie esthétique. Carouge, Switzerland, 1987.
- Lassignardie, Isabelle. Fred Forest: catalogue raisonné (1963-2008). Doctoral thesis in art history, Université de Picardie-Jules Verne, Amiens, France, 2010. An illustrated 4-vol. catalog plus a chapter of commentary covering nearly the entire span of Forest's career.
- Leruth, Michael. "From Aesthetics to Liminality: The Web Art of Fred Forest." Mosaic, 37.2 (June 2004): 79-106.
- Millet, Catherine. Contemporary Art in France. Engl. ed. Paris: Flammarion, 2006.
- Mœglin, Pierre. "Ce qu'il y a d'esthétique dans la communication et réciproquement.", Esthétique des Arts médiatiques 1 (Poissant, edit). Montréal: Presses de l'Université du Québec (1995): 63-75.
- Nedeltcho, Milev. "Fred Forest et la télévision bulgare: entre Eisenstein, Buñuel et Fellini." Communication et langages. 91(1992): 47-54.
- Popper, Frank. Art of the Electronic Age. London and New York: Thames and Hudson, 1993.
- ---. From Technological to Virtual Art. Cambridge, Massachusetts: MIT Press, 2007.
- Roland, Dominique, ed. Fred Forest, homme-média no. 1. Enghien-les-Bains, France: Centre des Arts - r-diffusion: 2013. French-English retrospective exhibition catalog.
- Wilson, Stephen. Information Arts: Intersections of Art, Science and Technology. Cambridge, Massachusetts: MIT Press, 2002.
