= Thomas Klinkowstein =

American Artist,Designer and Academic

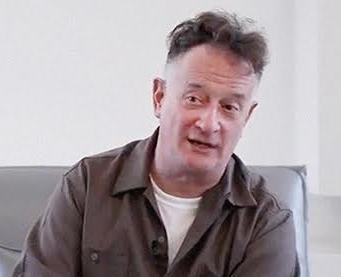
Tom Klinkowstein

Tom Klinkowstein born January 23, 1950, in Trenton, New Jersey, USA is an artist, designer and academic and President of Media A, LLC, a design and consulting group.

He is currently a professor at Hofstra University on Long Island, NY and an adjunct professor in the Graduate Communication Design Department at Pratt Institute in New York City. He was previously a docent at the AKV St. Joost academy of art and design in Breda, The Netherlands.

His 10-meter long digital artwork, A Networked Designer's Critical Path: 1990–2090, was shown at the Fifth Avenue (New York City) Gallery of the American Institute of Graphic Design.

The Museum of Modern Art in New York acquired a poster designed by Tom Klinkowstein for a performance by the artist Laurie Anderson to be part of its permanent collection and the Designing Modern Women exhibition.

In July 2015, during the Natan Karczmar's ArtComTec seminars, with other art people, philosophers and other thinkers influenced by Marshall McLuhan, he presented his vision also influenced by Martin Buber.

An installation suggesting the ideational life of a future designer, The Universe Emerges From Information: 10-43 Seconds in the State of Awareness of an Exo-Designer, 2055, was installed at Columbia University's Studio-X in Istanbul, Turkey.

The artist and writer Judy Malloy interviewed Tom Klinkowstein in 2017 about his work till then.

In March of 2026, Klinkowstein's, Not All Whens Are Time, regarding a change in the nature of time, was installed at Design School Kolding, in Kolding Denmark.

He is currently creating Folding Time, a work he will carry to space via a Virgin Galactic sub-orbital space flight in 2028.
