= Mario Costa (philosopher) =

Italian philosopher (1936–2023)

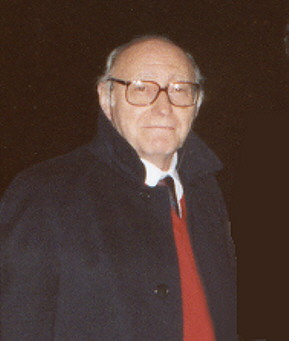
- Costa in 2003
- Born: 7 December 1936; Torre del Greco, Italy
- Died: 26 August 2023 (aged 86)

Philosophical work
- Era: 20th-century philosophy
- Region: Western philosophy
- Main interests: Art, aesthetics, technology
- Notable ideas: "Technological Sublime" "Aesthetics of Flux"

Mario Costa (7 December 1936 – 26 August 2023) was an Italian philosopher. He was known for his studies of the consequences of new technology in art and aesthetics, which introduced a new theoretical perspective through concepts such as the "communication aesthetics", the "technological sublime", the "communication block", and the "aesthetics of flux".

== Career ==
Costa had an extensive academic career. He was Professor of Aesthetics at the University of Salerno and taught Methodology and History of Literary Criticism at the University of Naples, and Ethics and Aesthetics of Communication at the University of Nice Sophia-Antipolis. He authored some twenty books and numerous essays, published in Europe and the United States. In 1985, he founded Artmedia, the Laboratory of the Aesthetics of Media and Communication, at the University of Salerno, Department of Philosophy. As a director of Artmedia, he developed an intense activity of promotion of neo-technological art and contributed by arranging many conferences and events in Naples, Paris, Köln, Toronto, Tel Aviv and São Paulo.

=== Thought ===
His theoretical work followed two main paths of research: 1) the socio-political and philosophical interpretation of the 20th-century artistic avant-garde, and 2) the development of a philosophy of technique, through the analysis of the changes introduced by new technology into art and aesthetics.

- Following the first research path, since the 1960s, he provided philosophical and aesthetic interpretations of several avant-garde movements, in art and literature. Particularly relevant are his works on Marcel Duchamp, Lettrism, Schématisme, and the functions of modern art criticism.
- Regarding the second path, his work was mainly concerned with a) the social and ethical consequences of technological communication, and b) the changes in the meaning of the 'aesthetic' and the 'artistic' due to the effects of new electro-electronic and digital technologies. This led him to suggest a radical change in this theoretical field, which was based on notions such as the "technological sublime" and the "aesthetics of flux".

=== The technological sublime ===
In the early 1980s, Costa started an investigation on media and communication technologies whose first result was the aesthetics of communication, a theory which conceptualizes the possibility of an aesthetics of simultaneity at a distance. The basic principles of this theory were stated in 1985. In the 1990s, Costa defined a more general, comprehensive, aesthetic and philosophical, theory of new media, which he named the technological sublime. He traced the history of the sublime and of its metamorphosis: the rhetoric sublime of the ancient philosophy, the natural sublime of the 18th century, the industrial-metropolitan sublime of modernity, and finally what he considered to be the latest form of the sublime, namely the technological sublime. He argued that the excess from which any manifestation of the sublime comes from is represented by all the new electro-electronic and digital technology of image, sound, writing, communication, and spaces. According to Costa, new technologies - which are developing as an exorbitant, self-operating technological system - imply on the one hand the weakening of the subject and the disappearance of the art and of all related categories (beauty, style, artistic personality, expression, etc.). On the other hand, new technologies are at the origin of a new aesthetic dimension, the technological sublime, which is defined by new categories: the de-subjectivation of aesthetic production, the hyper-subject, and the suppression of the symbolic and the meaning.

=== Contemporary art and the aesthetics of flux ===
According to Costa, the whole theoretical apparatus developed by traditional aesthetics, from the 18th century, has become completely obsolete and useless to understand the present manifestations of art. The emerging techno-anthropological condition and its most significant aesthetic products need a new explanation and theory, in which the "form", i.e., the basic category of traditional aesthetics, is finally substituted by the category of "flux", which his analysis considers both from a philosophical point of view and in its diverse aesthetic manifestations. Costa extended his reflection from the "cinematographic flux" to the present "technological aesthetic fluxes", made possible by the advent of digital technology and networks. He concluded that technological fluxes may also highlight essential aspects of contemporary ontology, being closely tied to our experience of time and existential attitude.

== Death ==
Mario Costa died on 26 August 2023, at the age of 86.

== Selected books ==
- Arte come soprastruttura, Napoli, CIDED, 1972
- Teoria e Sociologia dell'arte, Napoli, Guida Editori, 1974
- Le immagini, la folla e il resto. Il dominio dell'immagine nella società contemporanea, Napoli, Edizioni Scientifiche Italiane, 1982
- Il sublime tecnologico, Salerno, Edisud, 1990
- L'estetica dei media. Tecnologie e produzione artistica, Lecce, Capone Editore, 1990
- Sentimento del sublime e strategie del simbolico, Salerno, Edisud, 1996
- Della fotografia senza soggetto. Per una teoria dell'oggetto tecnologico, Genova/Milano, Costa & Nolan, 1997
- Le sublime technologique, Lausanne, IDERIVE, 1994 / O sublime tecnológico, São Paulo, Editora Experimento, 1995 / Il sublime tecnologico. Piccolo trattato di estetica della tecnologia, Roma, Castelvecchi, 1998
- L'estetica dei media. Avanguardie e tecnologia, Roma, Castelvecchi, 1999
- L'estetica della comunicazione, Roma, Castelvecchi, 1999
- Dall'estetica dell'ornamento alla computerart, Napoli, Tempo Lungo, 2000
- Internet et globalisation esthétique. L'avenir de l'art et de la philosophie à l'époque des réseaux, Paris, L'Harmattan, 2003
- Dimenticare l'arte. Nuovi orientamenti nella teoria e nella sperimentazione estetica, Milano, Franco Angeli, 2005
- La disumanizzazione tecnologica. Il destino dell'arte nell'epoca delle nuove tecnologie, Milano, Costa & Nolan, 2007
- Della fotografia senza soggetto. Per una teoria dell'oggetto estetico tecnologico, Milano, Costa & Nolan, 2008
- Arte contemporanea ed estetica del flusso, Vercelli, Mercurio Edizioni, 2010
- Ontologia dei media, Milano, Postmediabooks, 2012
- Dopo la tecnica. Dal chopper alle similcose, Napoli, Liguori Editore, 2015
- L’uomo fuori di sé, Milano, Mimesis, 2018
- Ebraismo e arte contemporanea, Milano, Mimesis, 2020
- Ebraismo e avanguardie, Salerno, Edisud, 2020

== See also ==
- List of philosophers
