= Richard Kriesche =

Austrian artist

Richard Kriesche (born 28 October 1940 in Vienna) is an Austrian artist. He is considered one of the most productive and influential contemporary artists in Austria.

== Life and work ==
From 1958 to 1963 he studied at the Academy of Fine Arts and at the University of Vienna. In 1991 Kriesche was appointed to the Hochschule für Gestaltung Offenbach. In 1995-96 he took over a guest professorship at the École des Beaux-Arts in Paris. In 1996 he was appointed deputy head of the science department in the Office of the Styrian Provincial Government and in 1998 was appointed to the culture department. From 2003 to 2005 Kriesche worked at the Landesmuseum Joanneum Graz.

His artistic fields of work include photo art, video art, computer art, net art, installations, performance and multimedia art. In his works, Kriesche attempts to bridge the gap between the genetic micro-worlds and the macro-worlds of the universe. With his sculptures and installations, Kriesche has been represented at numerous major media and art events. (Documenta, Biennale etc.).

For his lifetime achievements, he was awarded the Austrian Decoration for Science and Art.

== Exhibitions ==
Sources:

- Biennale di Venezia, Venice, 1968, 1986, 1995 (Honorable Mention)
- documenta 6, Kassel, 1977
- documenta 8, Kassel, 1987
- Ars Electronica, Linz, 1989, 1994, 2003 ("featured artist")
- Musée d'art moderne, Paris
- Centre Pompidou, Paris
- Museum of Modern Art, New York, 1978
- Institute of Contemporary Art, Los Angeles;
- Museum Moderner Kunst, Vienna
- Massachusetts Institute of Technology, Media Lab
- Washington Project for the Arts
- trigon 73, Graz
- Artsat - Mir, 1991
