= Edmond Couchot =

French digital artist and art theoretician (1932–2020)

Edmond Couchot (16 August 1932 – 26 December 2020) was a French digital artist and art theoretician who taught at the University Paris VIII.

== Life and work ==
Couchot was a Doctor of aesthetics in the visual arts. From 1982 to 2000 he headed the department of Arts and Technologies of the Image at the University Paris VIII. He continued to take part in speculative and hands-on study of digital imagery and virtual reality at University Paris VIII.

As a theoretician Dr. Couchot was interested in the connection between art and technology, in particular between the visual arts and data-processing techniques. He published approximately 100 articles on the digital and 3 books.

As a visual artist Dr. Couchot formed cybernetic devices requiring the participation of the spectator in the 1960s. He extended his investigation with digital interactive art and was involved in numerous international digital art exhibitions.

== Books ==
- Image. De l'optique au numérique, Hermès, Paris, 1988.
- La Technologie dans l’art. De la photographie à la réalité virtuelle, Éditions Jacqueline Chambon, 1998; 271 pages.

A tecnologia na arte. Da fotografica à realidade virtual, (traduction en portugais par Sandra Rey de La technologie dans l’art. De la photographie à la réalité virtuelle), 2003, Universidade federal do Rio Grande do Sul, 319 pages.

- Dialogues sur l’art et la technologie Autour d’Edmond Couchot, sous la direction de François Soulages, L’Harmattan, 2001.
- L’Art numérique. Comment la technologie vient au monde de l’art, Flammarion, février 2003, en collaboration avec Norbert Hillaire.

Réédition en 2005, chez le même éditeur, collection "Champs".

- Des Images, du temps et des machines, édité Actes Sud, 2007
- La plume (1988) (en collaboration avec Michel Bret)
- Pissenlit (1990) (en collaboration avec Michel Bret)

Ces œuvres (in progress) ont subi de très nombreuse modifications depuis leur origine et ont fait l'objet des expositions suivantes

== Digital installations ==
- 1988 Pixim (Paris)
- 1992 The Robots (Nagoya; Japan)
- 1995 Press/Enter (Toronto; Canada)
- 1995 Images du Futur (Montréal; Canada)
- 1995 Biennale Internationnale de Kwangju (Korea)
- 1998 Exposition Art virtuel, création interactives

et multisensorielles (Boulogne-Billancourt; France)

- 1999 Bienal Mercosul (Porto Alegre; Brésil)
- 2000 Art Numérique (Centre culturel Saint-Exupéry; Reims)
- 2001 Art.outsiders (Maison Européenne de la photographie; Paris)
- 2003 Le Voyage de l’Homme immobile (Musée d’art contemporain; Gène)
- 2005 Natural/Digital (numeriscausa à la Biche de Bère Gallery; Paris)

La Maison Européenne de la Photographie a acquis l’œuvre Je souffle à tout vent, en septembre 2001.
