= Francesco Monico =

Italian academic

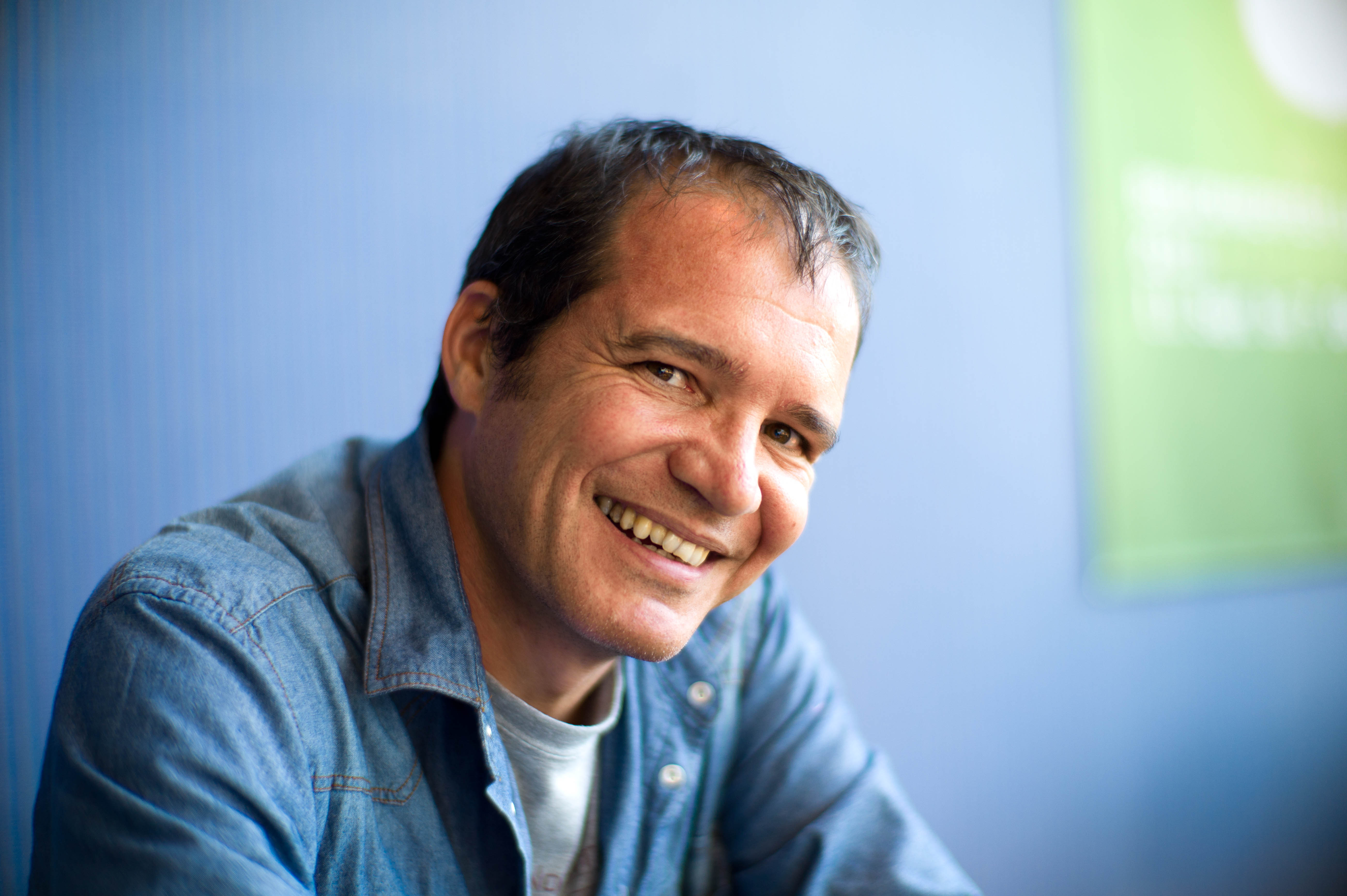
- Born: February 27, 1968 (age 58); Venice
- Occupations: Critical Artist, Academic

Francesco Monico (born Venice, February 27, 1968) is an Italian teacher, researcher, and pedagogist.

== Career ==
Monico worked for ten years as a director, screenwriter and program chief in Italian broadcast, sperimentale and interactive TV, is both a Technoetic researcher and artist. He was director and author for Rai3, Mediaset, Rai2, France 2, and channel manager for Tele+3, SeiMilano. Monico did research at Studium S3, at Fabrica, at the McLuhan Program in Culture and Technology at the University of Toronto. Former member of the Scientific Committee of Milano in Digitale with Antonio Caronia, Paolo Rosa, Pier Luigi Capucci, and Franco Torrani. Former member of the Scientific Committee of the Leonardo da Vinci Science and Technology Museum in Milan, with Giulio Giorello, Emanuele Severino, and Enrico Bellone.In the past in the style of the new left media theorist Raymond Williams he was a regular media commentator for the International Herald Tribune's Italian news section.

Today Monico is Dean at Accademia di Belle Arti Unidee at the Fondazione Pistoletto in Biella and Director of the School of Media Design & Multimedia Arts at the Accademia Costume e Moda in Rome and both working on research and development in education, technology and arts. Former director of the Media Design and Multimedia Arts Department he founded at the Nuova Accademia di Belle Arti Milano in Milan. Former professor of Theory and Method of Mass Media at the same institution, as well as founder director of the PhD program M-Node, Planetary Collegium, today known as T-node and a Senior Fellow of the McLuhan Program in Culture and Technology in Toronto, Canada. He is an alumnus of Derrick de Kerckhove. As a Scholar of Marshall McLuhan Monico became more focused on how technology shapes human communication, behaviour, and thought and is currently researching with Roy Ascott as member of the board of the international PhD program Planetary Collegium.Member of the Programme Committee of the Isea 2011. Monico writes in online and print publications, and did New Media art commentary for Wired Italian edition. As Director of the Planetary Collegium's M-Node he was part, with Roy Ascott, of the 2011 World Universities Forum Award for Best Practice in Higher Education. As Director of Research & Development project he settled up in 2013, with IOCOSE, the Transmodal Research between Art & Technology of STMICROELECTRONICS STINNOVATIONCUP 2013. In 2013, he is invited by European Commission President José Barroso to join New Narrative for Europe, a working network of European artists, creators, scientists and intellectuals to strengthen the contours of European unity. He was selected for the 2015 Italian edition of TED, as keen thinker about Higher Education, Cultural Management & Entrepreneurships at TEDxRoncade. Monico was Professor of Social Digital Innovation at the Faculty of Scienze Matematiche, Informatiche, Multimediali of the Università of Udine, and Professor of Archetype of Imagery at Accademia Belle Arti di Milano Brera.Today is Professor of Sociology of Media at the Consorzio Universitario Pordenone ISIA Roma and Professor of Artchetype of Imaginery at the Accademia Costume e Moda in Rome.

=== Art ===
Monico has changed his expression channel from video to art, with a penchant for interactive installations, telematic art, BioArt, and various art-science combinations.

Among his artworks is The Artist Formerly Known as Vanda (Tafkav - 2007/10) and Is there Love in the Technoetic Narcissus? In 2009 he was curator for the first Italian solo show of bioartist Brandon Ballengée, Monstre Sacré . In fall 2011 Monico presented the tryptic The Hybrid Constitution at the Istanbul International Art Festival Amber.

==== Methodology ====
After a research stint at the McLuhan Program he changed his expression channel from video to art, with a penchant for interactive installations, telematic art, BioArt, and various art-science combinations. Deeply influenced by Roy Ascott, Monico believes science and art can contribute to expanding global consciousness, but only with the help of alternative systems of knowledge. His modus operandi is based on a combination of science, art, philosophy, and esoteric knowledge in which the artist recognizes the paradoxical nature of knowledge and the contradictions inherent in formal epistemologies, and in his deep speculation his dealing with an hermeneutical approach. His methodology is a syncretic, mixing critical theory and a pragmatic art approach that he applied as founder of the School of Media design & New Media Art at NABA.

==== Exhibitions ====
- AMBER07: Body process arts festival. Istanbul, 9–17 November 2007. TAFKAV.
- DARS: Milan, 14–21 October 2008. TAFKAV.
- Premio Libero Ferretti: Ancona, 17–24 January 2009. TAFKAV.
- Festival Feedback Inter-acto Ergo Sum: San Casciano Val di Pesa, Florence, 26–28 June 2009.
- Palazzo della Permanente: Premio Libero Ferretti, Milan, 6–12 July 2009.
- StreamFest 2009, Mostra Wet & Dry Relazioni tra arte e natura nel contemporaneo tecnologico. Galatina, Italy, 2–12 August 2009. TAFKAV.
- Mya Lurgo Gallery - Germinazioni curated by Martina Cavallarin: Lugano, Switzerland, 11 November 2009. TAFKAV.
- PAV Parco d'Arte Vivente - Diverse Forme Bellisme with Piero Gilardi, curated by Claudio Cravero: Turin, Italy, 5 February 2010 to 11 April 2010. Is There Love in The Technoetic Narcissus? and TAFKAV.
- Nowhere Gallery - Il Ciclo Dell'Alterità: The Artist Formerly Known As Vanda, and C'è amore nel Narciso technoetico? ("Is There Love In The Technoetic Narcissus?"), Milan, 11 June to 17 July 2010.
- The Merchant of Venice, - Biennale Vegetale. Doppia con Caroline Bougoreau. Venezia, Italy, 1–12 June 2011. TAFKAV, Studio Monitor.
- AMBER11: NEXT ECOLOGY. Istanbul, 4–13 November 2011. The HYBRID CONSTITUTION.

==== Art curacy ====
- Monico, F. (2009). Monstre Sacré - Brandon Ballengée, Nowhere Gallery, Via del Caravaggio 12, Milano, 18 September 2009, Special Start Milano.

==== Conferences and symposium curacy ====
- PUBLIC!, 30 june 2022, Accademia Unidee - , curated by Francesco Monico, Paolo Naldini, Michele Cerruti But;
- +ETICA +MODA, 22 june 2021, Fondazione Pistoletto - Accademia Unidee Fondazione Pistoletto, curated by Francesco Monico;
- Future Firm, Past Innovation, Present Labour. A Trinamic View On Contemporary Enterprise, 14 may 2021, Accademia Unidee - Fondazione Pistoletto - Polidesign Milano, curated by Francesco Monico, Marina Parente, Michele Cerruti But;
- Most Post Human IV April 9, 2014, MUSE, Corso del Lavoro e della Scienza 3. Trento. Curated by Francesco Monico, Massimiliano Viel, Gianna Angelini;
- Most Post Human II July 22, 2013, NABA, Via Carlo darwin 20, Milano. Curated by Francesco Monico, Giovanni Leghissa;
- Most Post Human I April 30, 2013, DOMUS ACADEMY, Via Carlo darwin 20, Milano. Curated by Francesco Monico, Giovanni Leghissa;
- New Media Art Education & Research 4: Always Already New - Deep Involvement of Education - Democratic Higher Education November 18 – 19, 2011, NABA, Via Carlo darwin 20, Milano. Curated by Francesco Monico, Pier Luigi Capucci;
- Art as Media as Display, Biennals as Platform for Social Change: ISEA 2011 & Biennal of Art Istanbul September 17, 2011, Nederlands Consulaat General, Istiklal Caddesi 197, 34433 Beyoglu, Istanbul. Curated by Francesco Monico, Maurizio Bortolotti, Marieke Van Hal. Speakers: Hedwig Fijen, Katarina Gregos, Nazim Dikbaş, Martha Rosler, Yongwoo Lee, Lanfranco Aceti;
- New Media Art Education & Research 3: Always Already New - Thinking Media, Subversing Feeling, Scaffolding Knowledge: Art and Education in the Praxis of Transformation December 16 – 18, 2010, MEDIATECA SANTA TERESA, Via della Moscova 28, Milano. Curated by Francesco Monico, Pier Luigi Capucci;
- New Media Art Education & Research 2009- 2 Topics 14 April 2008 – FONDAZIONE FORMA PER LA FOTOGRAFIA, - Sala delle Capriate, Piazza Tito Lucrezio Caro, Milan – ITALY Mercoledì, 4 marzo 2009. Curated by Francesco Monico;
- New Media art Education & Research 2008 14 APRIL 2008 – FONDAZIONE FORMA PER LA FOTOGRAFIA – ITALY, Piazza Tito Lucrezio Caro 1, 20136 Milano, curated by Francesco Monico & Luca Galli.
- Researching the Future: aspects of Art and Technoetics 2007, CENTRO PER L'ARTE CONTEMPORANEA LUIGI PECCI, PRATO December 7-8-9, 2007, curated by Francesco Monico & Roy Ascott.
- Researching the Future: art and design in transmodal transition 2006 Milano, February 8–9, 2006, curated by Francesco Monico.

== Bibliography ==
- Monico, F. (2006). Il Dramma Televisivo: l'Autore e l'Estetica del Mezzo. Meltemi.edu, 58. Roma: Meltemi. ISBN 88-8353-471-9.
- Monico, F. (2006). Il Dramma televisivo: lexicon. m-node, Lulù, ISBN 978-88-95286-00-6.
- Monico, F. (2006). White Rabbit On The Moon in Technoetic Arts, July-06, Vol.4, Issue:2:Intellect. Print ISSN 1477-965X
- Monico, F. (2007). TV 2.0. Il pubblico come autore. Meltemi, Le melusine, 192, ISBN 9788883536403.
- Monico, F. (2008). La Variazione Technoetica in "Le variazioni Grandi" Quaderno di Comunicazione 8. Roma: Meltemi.
- Monico, F. (2008). Is There Love in The Technoetic Narcissus? in "New Realities: Being Syncretic" Edition Angewandte, Springer-Verlag. Edited by Ascott, R.; Bast, G.; Fiel, W.,ISBN 978-3-211-78890-5.
- Monico, F. (2008). Introduzione a: Derrick De Kerckhove Dall'alfabeto a Internet. L'Homme "Litteré": Alfabetizzazione, Tecnologia, Cultura Traduzione di Antonio Caronia. Mimesis Edizioni. ISBN 978-88-8483-593-2.
- Monico, F. (2009). TAFKAV a Technoetic Installation in Technoetic Arts, December-09, Vol.7, Issue:3:Intellect. Print ISSN 1477-965X
- Monico, F. (2010).Introduzione and Uno di Uno - esiste una New Italian (media) Epic? Da una narrazione letteraria a una narrazione mediatica in LIMINA n.1/2010, Vol.1, January 2010, edited by Amos Bianchi, M-Node per NABA LIBRI, Print ISBN 978-88-95286-07-5
- Monico, F. (2010).Learning Machine - Il Manuale, 2010, edited by Elisabetta Galasso & Marco Scotini, in collaborazione con Alessandro Guerriero, NABA LIBRI.
- Monico, F. (2012).Dei Precrimini e del Pensarsi, pag 249-260, in Anja Puntari, FEAR, Percorsi di Ricerca e Pratica Artistica, ISBN 978-88-906898-0-2
- Monico, F. (2012).An Experience on Higher Education in LIMINA 2 n.2/2012, Vol.2, July 2012, edited by Gabriela Galati, M-Node per NABA LIBRI, Print ISBN 978-88-95286-09-9
- Monico, F. (2013)."Lexicon in Expanded Cinema, by Gene Youngblood (First italian edition), November 2013, italian edition by Pier Luigi Capucci and Simonetta Fadda, CLUEB, pp. 389, ISBN 978-88-491-2788-1
- Monico, F. (2014). Premesse per una costituzione ibrida: la macchina, la bambina automatica e il bosco in "La condizione postumana" AUT AUT 361. Milano: Saggiatore.
- Monico, F. (2015).Lo que se podrìa y deberìa decir: de los "objectors narrativos no identificados" a la New Italian Epic (de los media)/"What one Could and Should Say: from Unidentified narrative Objects to New Italian (Media) Epic" in Beyond Darwin. La senda coevolutiva del arte, la tecnologìa y la consciencia./ "The Co-Evolutionary Path of Art, Technology and Consciousness", Edited by Roy Ascott y Angela Molina F. (Eds), Col-leccìo Formes Plastiques, Istituto Alfons el Magnànim, Print ISBN 978-84-7822-661-0
- Monico, F. (2016).L’eterodossia accademica come pratica controambientale della libertà dell'essere al condizionamento tecnico. Una postfazione su Antonio Caronia in Mondi altri. Processi di soggettivazione nell'era postumana a partire dal pensiero di Antonio Caronia, Edited by Giovanni Leghissa e Amos Bianchi, Mimesis Edizioni, Collana Postumani, Print ISBN 978-8857534107
- Monico, F. (2017). Cyber-sorveglianza, guerra e religione, il mondo a una dimensione" Conversazione tra Francesco Monico e Derrick De Kerckhove in Azimuth 7/2016 Human and Digital Traces, Edited by Simone Guidi and Alberto Romele, ISBN 9788863729436
- Monico, F. (2020). Fragile - Un nuovo immaginario del progresso, foreword by Simone Guidi, Meltemi Editore, ISBN 978-8855191647
- Monico, F. (2023). in S. Bellucci, D. Castagno, A. di Russo Il tempo di Kairos - Intorno a un tavolo tra memoria e futuro, Heraion Editore, ISBN 979-1281103023
- Monico, F. (2023). Invulnerabile - L'immaginario magico e il rigore razionale. foreword by Derrick de Kerckhove, Heraion Editore.
- Monico, F. (2024). Care of New Knowledges – Educene (pp. 1214–1231). In Design Across Borders United in Creativity – Cumulus Proceedings Series Monterrey 20024, Cumulus the Global Association of Art and Design Education and Research. Aalto University, School of Arts, Design and Architecture ISSN 2490-046X - ISBN 978-952-7549-06-3 (pdf) No. 13 Cumulus Conference Proceedings Series.
- Monico, F. (2025) (a cura di ). Spiritualità, Michelangelo Pistoletto, Antonio Spadaro, Marsilio Editore.
- Monico, F. Naldini P., Cerruti But M., (2025) (a cura di ). L’arte della ricerca La cura dei nuovi saperi nei dottorati accademici, Mimesis Editore.

=== Narrative ===
- Monico, F. (2019). Le somiglianze del vero. L'erudita - Giulio Perrone Editore, Roma, Gennaio 2019. ISBN 978-88-6770-485-9.

=== Articles ===
- Monico, F. (2009). La soglia tra arte ed essere. D'ARS, N.198. June 2009, page 29-31 Special 53° Biennale di Venezia, Milano, ISSN 0011-6726.
