= Angel F =

Angel_F

Angel_F is a fictional child artificial intelligence that has been used in art performances worldwide focused on the issues of digital liberties, intellectual property and on the evolution of language and behaviour in information society. The character was created by Salvatore Iaconesi in 2007 as a hack to the Biodoll art performance by Italian artist Franca Formenti.

The project was later joined by Oriana Persico who curated communication and part of the theoretical approaches of the action.

The Angel_F project has been featured in books, magazines, national television, and has been invited to many conferences and events, both academic and artistic.

== Creation ==
Angel_F is a backronym which stands for Autonomous Non Generative E-volitive Life_Form. The project was born in 2007 and resulted from the fusion of two contemporary art performances.

Franca Formenti, an Italian artist living in Varese, invented the Biodoll character in 2002, which began making its appearances first on the network and later in the physical world by using what were called "clones": young women, prostitutes, pornographic starlets, transsexuals and models interpreting the role of a digital prostitute. The Biodoll was an art performance focused on research emerging from the network of new forms of sexualities, and on the analysis of changes brought on by this transformation to the concepts of private and public spaces, privacy, and the possibility of creating multiple fluid identities through language and digital media.

The theme of fertility has always been central to the Biodoll performance: the digital prostitute was a wombless clone but desired giving birth to a son, the 'Bloki'.

In a process starting in 2006, and ending in February 2007, Salvatore Iaconesi (xDxD.vs.xDxD) used his 'Talker' linguistic artificial intelligence to animate the digital child conceived with prof. Derrick de Kerckhove: Angel_F.

Iaconesi and Persico met in November 2006 and immediately started collaborating on the birth of Angel_F.

Angel_F was designed as a synthetic digital being composed through narrative, technological and cognitive psychology layers. The objective was to create iconic characteristics that resulted in being evocative and able to mimic human life up to a level in which bringing up a symbolic dialogue was possible. On the other side, the artificial identity was to implement and expose the cultural, emotional and relational ways that were typical of networked social ecosystems, among those technologies, systems and infrastructures that entered and shaped people's daily lives.

The young digital being mimicked the evolution of a human baby: initially conceived inside the website of its digital mother it emulated the birth of a child by using the metaphor of a virus developing inside a website, taking progressively more space in the domain's databases and interfaces. Content was produced through the software by using small browser-based spyware techniques, through which Angel_F could infer the list of major portals that had been visited by the website's users.

The Biodoll website was invaded by this growing presence and, thus, Angel_F was born.

The Artificial Intelligence (AI) component of Angel_F was derived from another project, Talker, through which internet users could build up the AI's linguistic network by feeding it their text and web clips. Angel_F used this component to generate sentences and phrases, publishing them on the interface and on selected blogs.

The parallel between the growth of the AI and that of a child kept building up and, just as children learn how to speak and act by observing their parents and the people around them, Angel_F used its spyware and AI components to learn, to navigate websites and web portals using web crawler based techniques, and to interact with other people by using the contents hosted and generated in its database to create surreal dialogues in blogs and websites.

A virtual school was created, called Talker Mind, to narratively continue the AI's growth. Five professors (Massimo Canevacci, Antonio Caronia, Carlo Formenti, Derrick de Kerckhove and Luigi Pagliarini) fed their texts and academic articles to Angel_F, simulating virtual asynchronous lessons by using a multi-blog structure.

A peer-to-peer system was also created at the time, named 'Presence'. Its interface resembled the one of 8-bit videogames and the peer to peer users travelled in a starry space and were able to perform standard Instant Messaging tasks, such as chat and file sharing. The interactions were possible both among humans and digital beings. Angel_F was the first user of the Presence peer to peer system.

Angel_F entered the physical world as a baby-stroller mounted laptop computer that was used to let the digital child join events and conferences held worldwide.

== Events ==
Angel_F performed all over the world, both in artistic contexts and in academic ones. It was also used for the communication strategy of several activist groups on the themes of intellectual property and digital freedoms.

The first public space performance was held in Milan, when the Biodoll distributed a generative free press publication (called the Bloki FreePreXXX, its text was generated algorithmically and inserted into a prepared graphic layout).

June 14, 2007: The second performance was held in Rome, at the Forte Prenestino, with a massive playroom created through computational graphics that people could interact with and that were generated by the AI.

June 22, 2007: Angel_F presented the closing remarks for an Ipotesi per Assurdo (Absurd Hypothesis) with Salvatore Iaconesi and Oriana Persico at the IULM University in Milan, discussing the possibilities for an ecosystemic, sustainable reinvention of corporations.

July 28, 2007: Hundreds of people at LiberaFesta (Free Party) in Rome listened to Angel_F in a speech discussing new politics and hacker ethics.

2007: The Glocal & Outsiders conference held in Prague at the Academy of Sciences was the first academic presentation of the Angel_F project, together with the Biodoll. September 2007: Angel_F was not allowed to post its contribution to the DFIR (Dialogue Forum for Internet Rights) held in Rome in preparation for Rio de Janeiro's Internet Governance Forum (IGF) edition. The case quickly turned into a collaboration among the involved parties and Angel_F was invited to the global event in Brazil where it was the only digital being present. Angel_F contributed a videomessage, in the digital freedoms workshop, which suggested some ideas for action to the United Nations and to all the parties involved in the IGF organization.

October 2007: Angel_F was presented live at the FE/MALE 2 event, as an example of an atypical family during a public debate on new sexualities and social change.

October 2007: Angel_F made a series of public performances Florence's Festival della Creatività (Festival of Creativity), an institutional event held periodically to showcase Italy's and other countries' best technological projects. During the festival Derrick de Kerckhove publicly recognized the little AI as his digital son.

December 2007: Several international associations, and scientific researchers had been involved with Angel_F, eventually producing the system and process used to set up the Talker Mind digital school for the AI with Angel_F's professors.

March 2008: The Tecnológico de Monterrey university in Mexico City organized the Computer Art Congress 2 international event, featuring Angel_F's project among with the ones by scientific researchers worldwide.

July 2008: The project was presented in Austria at the Planetary Collegium's Consciousness Reframed 9 conference, together with the 'NeoRealismo Virtuale'.

October 2008: Angel_F was used at a public event on a European scale called Freedom not Fear discussing privacy and civil liberties.

July 2009: Angel_F has been seen with its digital father Derrick de Kerckhove to protest against Italy's harsh politics on freedom of speech.

The project concluded in 2009 with the publication of a book entitled 'Angel F. Diario di una intelligenza artificiale' (Angel_F, the diaries of an Artificial Intelligence).
