= Petros Pizanias =

Greek professor of history

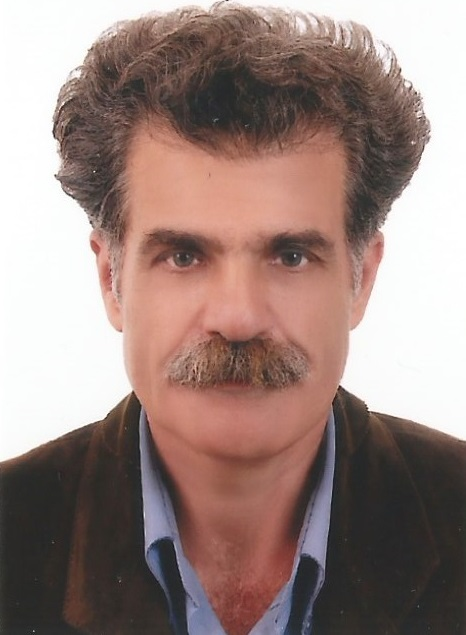
- Born: 1947 (age 78–79); Athens, Greece
- Occupation: professor of history

Petros Th. Pizanias (born 1947, Athens) is an emeritus professor of history of the Ionian University.

== Background ==
His parents were Theodore Pizanias, a tailor and Anastasia Pizanias, a housewife. They originally came from the island of Kalymnos and the city of Piraeus, respectively. He is married to Alice Vaxevanoglou, with whom he has a son, Stefanos Pizanias, who is physicist.

== Social and political activity ==
- 1969–1974 Successively a member and a directing cadre of the youth branch of the resistance organizations PAM and Rigas Feraios and later a member of the Communist Party of Interior (Eurocommunist) in Paris.
- 1976–1984 Contributor to the political journals O Politis (The Citizen) and Dekapenthimeros Politis (Fortnight Citizen).
- 1984–1989 Founding cadre of the political party The Greek Left (Ε. ΑΡ.), member of the political direction and director of the department for the definition of policy regarding the educational system and scientific research.
- 1994–1997 President of the scientific committee of the Institute of Strategic and Development Studies – A. Papandreou.
- 1997–1998 Prime advisor to the Minister of National Education on planning the reforms for primary and secondary education.
- 2000–2002 Member of the Central Council of the National School of Public Administration.
- 2010–2013 Member of the Direction Council of the Hellenic NARIC.
- 1984– 2017 Publication of numerous articles in several newspapers of national circulation mostly on political issues of the Greek society.

== Studies, scientific work and academic career ==
- 1972–1980 Undergraduate studies in history, École des Hautes Études en Sciences Sociales, and in Geography and Sociology, University Paris VIII.
- 1980–1981 Postgraduate studies (Diplôme d'études approfondies) in history, École des Hautes Études en Sciences Sociales.
- 1982–1985 Doctoral studies (École des Hautes Études en Sciences Sociales) on social and economic history with specific subject Salaries and revenues in Greece 19th- early 20th century. The main analysis of this research explains the emergence and the evolution of employees of banks and the public sector as the new medium social strata in the Greek society. It is proposed that social position determines the level of the salaries and creates occasions for acquiring revenues in general.
- 1980–1986 Researcher at the Historical Archive of the National Bank of Greece, coordinator of the group of researchers who worked in the program on History of prices, wages and salaries in Greece, 19th- early 20th century, under the direction of Spyros I. Asdrachas.
- 1987–2014 Elected Lecturer and, in succession, full professor in Modern and contemporary Greek history at the History department of the Ionian University.
- 1996–2002 Nominated Chair Unesco holder and director of the net Unitwin for the training on teaching and researching history in the Universities of Albania.
- 1998–2014 Established and directed a program of post-graduate studies about contemporary Balkan societies in the department of history of the Ionian University and in collaboration with the department of history and archaeology of the University of Ioannina. Since 2008, this program acquired a new orientation namely Historical research, didactics and new technologies in collaboration with the department of informatics.
- 1998–2008 Scientific director of several research or educational programs financed by the E.U.
- 1985-till today Occasionally, Visiting or Invited professor or Lecturer at the École des Hautes Études en Sciences Sociales, Université Paul Valéry III, CNRS-Laboratoire de Démographie Historique, Ecole Normale Supérieure-Paris, University of Crete- Department of economic studies, University of Ioannina- Department of History and Archeology, University of Athens-Postgraduate studies in modern history, and also lectures in various scientific associations like Greek Association of Economic History, MNIMON-Association of modern Greek history, The cultural Foundation of National Bank of Greece and many others.
- 2002-till today Director of a large-scale historical research under the title The Hermes of modern Greeks. A digital database with prosopographical parameters of selected social groups which played an important role in the Greek revolution of 1821. These are the Intellectuals of the Greek Enlightenment from 1700c to 1821 (420 persons included in this database), members and cadres of the revolutionary organization Philiki Etairia from 1816 to 1821 (1.582 persons included in this database), the Civilians fighters during the Greek revolution from 1821 to 1830 (37.852 persons included in the database) and the members of all political institutions of the Greek Revolution from 1821 to 1830 (7.302 persons included in the database).

Throughout his career P. Th. Pizanias has organized several international and national scientific conferences and symposia and has participated in international congresses. His scientific articles of were published in Greek, French, and English in the journals: Ta Istorika, The Greek Review of Political Science, Annales-Économies, Sociétés, Civilisation, etc.

In 2015 he was nominated Emeritus Professor of History of the Ionian University.

== A. Books by Petros Th. Pizanias, published by 2017 ==
1. Salaries and Incomes in Greece 1841-1923. The Employees of the National Bank of Greece. Introduction by Spyros Asdrachas, National Bank of Greece-Cultural Foundation (In Greek)
2. The Marxism of Historical Social Democracy, Politypo Publications, 1987 (in Greek).
3. Economic History of the Greek Raisin 1851-1912. Production, International Market, Price Formation, Crisis. Foundation for Research and Education-Commercial Bank of Greece, 1988 (in Greek).
4. The Price Fluctuation in the Greek City-Markets. Piraeus, Patras, Ermoupolis, Athens, (19th-20th century) -Mouvement des prix en Grèce XIXe début du XXs. Le Pirée, Hérmopolis Patras. In collaboration with G.N. Mitrofanis. Publication by National Bank of Greece-Cultural Foundation, 1991 (A bilingual publication in Greek and French).
5. The City Poor: The Know-how of Surviving in Greece during the Inter-war Era. Themelio publications, History series, 1993 (in Greek).
6. Time in history. Methodological Perspectives on History. Alexandria publications, 2002 (in Greek).
7. From Reaya to Greek Citizen. Enlightenment and Revolution 1750-1821. Introduction to the collective volume The Greek Revolution of 1821. A European Event, Ionian University and Kedros Publications, 2009 (in Greek).
8. The Greek Revolution of 1821. A European event, Issis Publications, Istanbul 2011 Direction (in English).
9. The history of Modern Greeks. From 1400 c to 1820, Hestia Publications, Athens 2015 (in Greek).

== B. Articles with fundamental analysis (The papers are omitted) ==
1. “Rapports de prêt et domination économique. La fondation de la Banque Nationale de Grèce 1841-1847”, Conference Proceedings 1986, vol. II, P. 451–476 in Economies méditerranéennes: équilibres et intercommunications. Several publications of this article followed in various editions.
2. “La production agricole en Grèce au XIX siècle: Rapports et revenus”, Proceedings pp 468–489 in Le monde rural dans l΄air mediteranéenne. Published also in Greek under the title “Agricultural production in the Greek 19th century: relationships and incomes”, journal Ta Istorika, 3/1985.
3. “Revenus paysans et rapports sociaux en Grèce au 19e siècle”. ANNALES, Economies-Sociétés-Civilisations, no. 1, 1990, Janvier-Février, p. 37-53 (Fully re-processed version of the article no. 2).
4. “Implementation of the theory about the relation between the capitalistic centre and the under-developed periphery” in the Greek historiography: N. Psiroukis – K. Tsoukalas”. Journal MNIMON 11/1987, (in Greek).
5. “Surplus agricole et circulation du capital commercial en Grèce au 19e siècle”. ANNALES, Economies- Sociétés-Civilisations, no. 2, 1992, Mars Avril). (Published also in Greek “Agricultural surplus and circulation of the commercial capital in Greece in the 19th century”, Journal Ta Istorika 10/1989.
6. «Headless Social subjects. A voyage in political relations with subjectivity as guide», Elliniki Epitheorissi Politikis Epistimis, 4/1994 (in Greek).
7. “Structural characteristics of relations between political parties, society and the state” at the conference Political parties in the new era, INERPOST – Gnosis Publications, p. 226-235, Athens, 1996 (in Greek).
8. “The circle and the square. About the double life of historical reality”, Elliniki Epitheorissi Politikis Epistimis, 6/1996 (in Greek).
9. “Evaluation of the political institutions and the political elite on the part of the Citizens. Relationships and interactions”, in Citizens and politicians in Greece today. The findings of a research. ISTAME Publications, Athens 1997.
10. “A mode of production and informal activities”, Irmos, social sciences periodical publication, 1/1998.
11. “Revolution and the nation. A historic-sociological approach to 1821”, in History of Modern Hellenism 1770-2000, vol. 3, Athens, 2003.
12. “The Greek agricultural world 1832-1871”, in History of Modern Hellenism 1770-2000, vol. 4, Athens, 2004.
