= Sheila Ribeiro =

Artist working on Digital and Body Arts

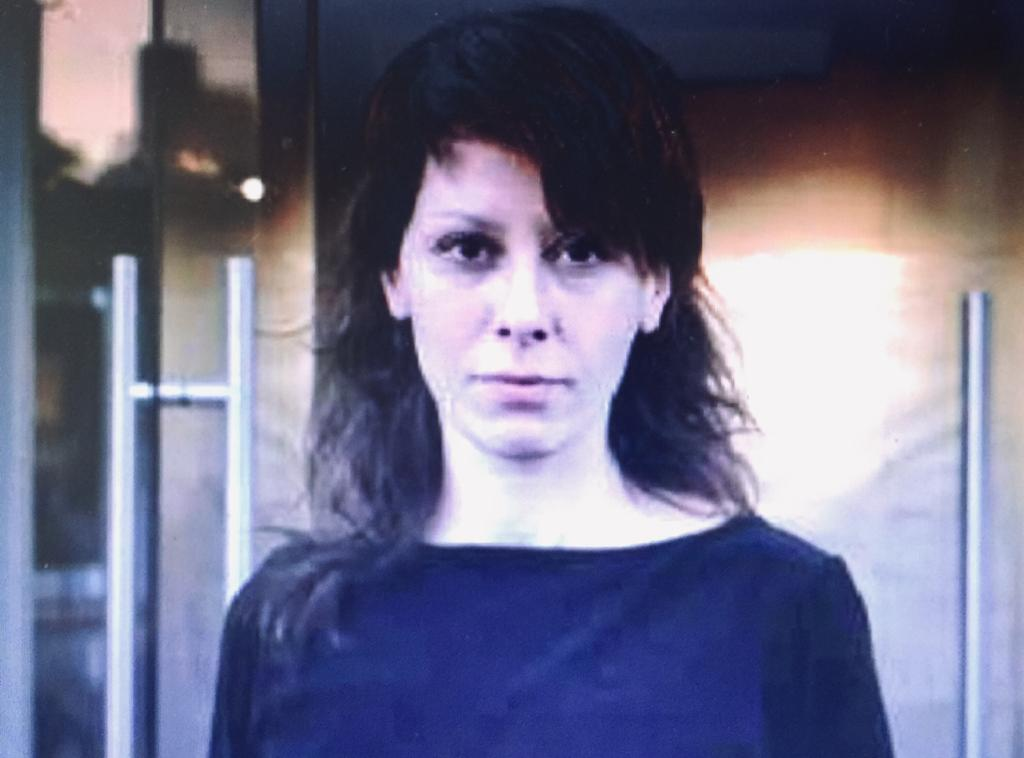
- Born: March 25, 1973 (age 53)
- Occupation: Artist

Sheila Ribeiro (born March 25, 1973) is an artist considered to be post-convergent, working in an interdependent, multivectorial and extradisciplinary networked media ecosystem, expressed in an evaporated and remixed materiality. Involved with digital and body arts, as well as conceptual fashion, technology and communication and cultural studies. Currently lives between Salvador, Montreal and Rome. She was married to the anthropologist Massimo Canevacci.

== Career ==
Ribeiro is known for her fragmented, fantastical work, treating contemporary power dynamics, migration codes, digital cognition and pop fashion aesthetics, as well as for her multipurpose extra-disciplinary way of working through installations, performances, films, fashion shoots, dance pieces on stage, on camera, on the street.

She has been an artist since 1992 and has also been a consultant on transdisciplinarity, contemporary arts and cultures in the development of new epistemologies.

== Performances and artworks ==
- 2021 Neither National Nor Geographical
- 2016 Codex
- 2014 #sheilaribeiro sampleado
- 2014 Uma Risada te Sepultará
- 2012 Chamando ela sem eles
- 2011 Your Beautiful Eyes
- 2011 Imitanting Jimmie Durham
- 2010 Organic Totem
- 2007 Flesh Organizer
- 2003 Show
- 2002 Diet Subtitles
- 2000 Flea Market: we are used and cheap
- 1999 Marché aux puces, nous sommes usagés et pas chers
- 1992 Food in the trash (Comida no lixo)

== Collaborations ==
- 2016 Codex Mundo Algodão, with Alejandro Ahmed
- 2016 Codex Sangue de Barata, with Wagner Schwartz
- 2015 Tira meu Fôlego, with Elisa Othake
- 2014 Outros Usuários, with Marcos Moraes
- 2013 Lugar pra ficar em pé | Almost, with Núcleo do Dirceu
- 2012 Receitas e Dúvidas, with Wagner Schwartz and Gustavo Bittencourt
- 2009 Um dente chamado Bico, with Jorge Alencar
- 2006 Sandmann, with Massimo Canevacci
- 2005 V I P, at 100 rencontres, Benoît Lachambre
- 2005 Pay Here, at 100 rencontres, Benoît Lachambre
- 2004 Killing an Arab, with Joe Hiscott
- 2003 The first REAL human clone, at 100 rencontres, Benoît Lachambre
- 2003 Madame PIPI, at 100 rencontres, Benoît Lachambre
- 2003 Vacances, at 100 rencontres, Benoît Lachambre
- 2000 Flea Market, we are used and cheap, with Sophie Deraspe

== Publications ==
- 2015 Chamando Ela ISBN 8598741671

== Films ==
- 2004 — The Telephone Eulogies by Joe Hiscott
- 2006 — Missing Victor Pellerin (Rechercher Victor Pellerin) by Sophie Deraspe

== Awards ==
- 2014 Prêmio APCA 2014 – Projeto 7x7 – categoria "Iniciativa em Dança", Associação Paulista de Críticos de Arte
- 2014 Legado – Rumos Itaú Cultural Dança #sampleado, Itaú Cultural
- 2014 Prêmio APCA 2014 – Tira meu fôlego – categoria elenco, Associação Paulista de Críticos de Arte
