= Hellenic Translation Society =

The Hellenic Society for Translation Studies (Greek: Ελληνική Εταιρεία Μεταφρασεολογίας) is a non-profit organization that promotes research on translation, interpreting, and localization.

== History and objectives ==
The Hellenic Society for Translation Studies was founded in 2011 by 21 leading academics, during the 2nd Meeting of Greek-speaking Translation Scholars held at the Aristotle University of Thessaloniki. The Society's official language is Greek.

The aim of the Society is to serve as a forum for the exchange of views and reflections for trainers, researchers, and professionals in the fields of translation, interpreting, and localization in the Greek-speaking world. It also aspires to promote the importance, usefulness, and complexity of translation and its crucial role in contemporary societies. More particularly, the Society aims at promoting scientific research in the fields of translation, interpreting, and localization, facilitating the interaction between professional and academic bodies in the above-mentioned fields, providing consultancy services in matters of translation and interpreting teaching and training, providing information and promoting collaborations at a national and international level on issues relating to translation, interpreting and localization research, as well as the research outputs and applications.

== Activities ==
To achieve the above goals, the Society monitors the work of Greek-speaking TS scholars and gathers the relevant bibliographical references in a database. The Society coordinates the Translation Festival in the framework of the International Book Fair of Thessaloniki and organizes a series of events and actions on relevant topics. In the Book Fair, there is also a stand under the name "The haunt of translators" where universities and professional associations for Greek translators and interpreters have the opportunity to meet and share knowledge and experiences (from May 2016-till now). The Society organizes events, conferences and seminars both online and in person. It organized in collaboration with the Ionian University the 1st Colloquium of Young Researchers entitled "Translation and Translation Studies in the Greek-speaking Area" (Corfu, December 2016), in collaboration with the Aristotle University of Thessaloniki, the National and Kapodistrian University of Athens, and the Ionian University a workshop entitled "Seeking the new through translation: diachronic and synchronic approaches in the Greek-speaking world" (Athens, April 2019), in collaboration with the National and Kapodistrian University of Athens, the University of Cyprus, and the Translator Training Center meta|φραση, the workshop entitled "Looking to tomorrow: research, applications, tools and practices" (Athens, May 2022).

== Sources ==
- Official website of the Hellenic Society for Translation Studies
- Bodosakis Institution - Hellenic Society for Translation Studies
- Scientific Journal Syn-Thèses, Introduction: the Greek example in Translation Studies (in Greek)
