= Centre for Culture and Technology =

Centre for Culture and Technology may refer to:

- Centre for Culture and Technology (Toronto), at the University of Toronto
- The Centre for Culture and Technology (CCAT) at Curtin University
