= Pier Luigi Capucci =

Italian writer

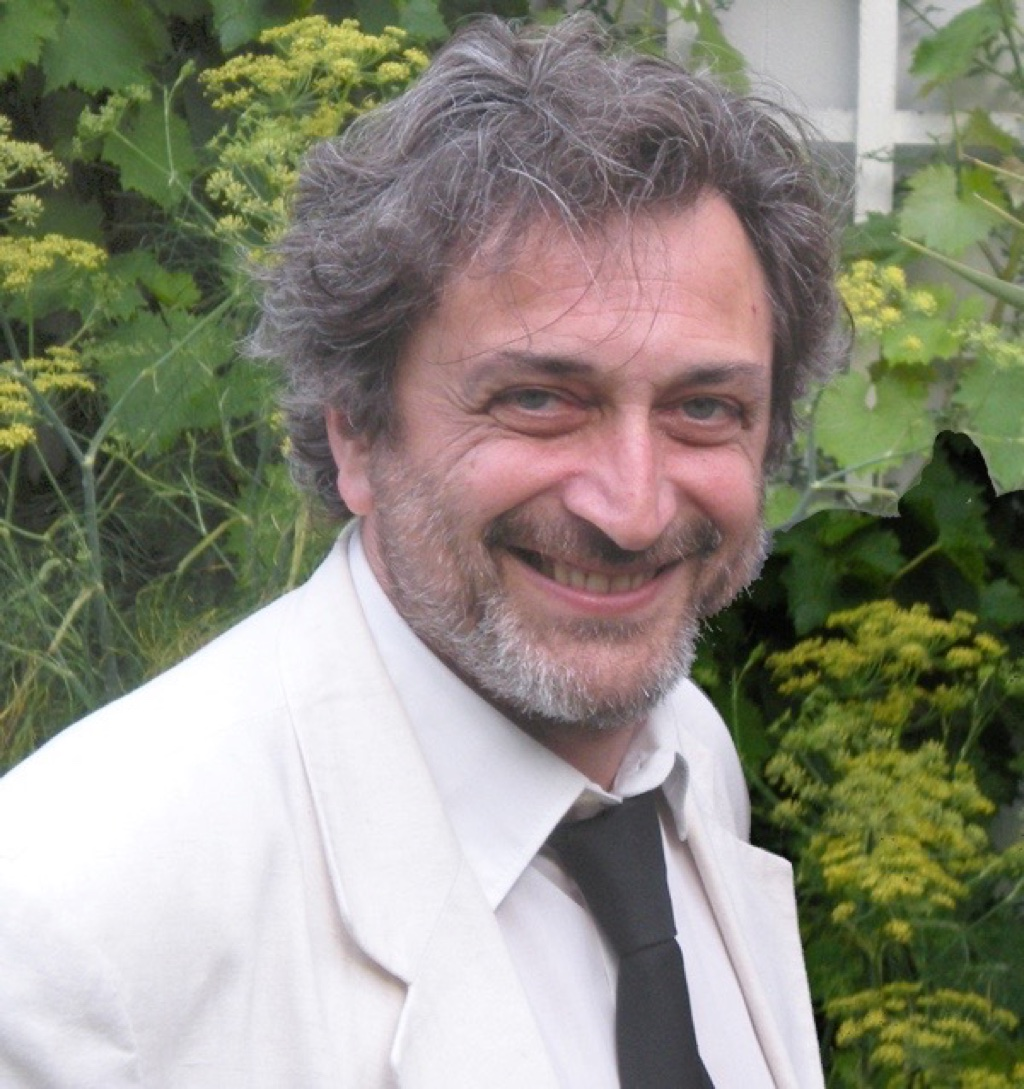
- Born: Lugo, Emilia-Romagna, Italy
- Occupations: Educator; writer; theorist
- Employer(s): Fine Arts Academy of Urbino; Università degli Studi di Udine; Noema
- Website: capucci.org

Pier Luigi Capucci is an Italian educator, theorist and writer in the fields of media (both in communications and the arts) and of the relationships among culture, sciences and technologies.

== Career ==
Since the early '80s Capucci has been concerned with the communication's studies, the new media and the new art forms, and with the relations among arts, sciences and technologies. He has been professor at the Universities of Rome "La Sapienza", Bologna, Florence, at SUPSI – University of Applied Sciences and Arts of Southern Switzerland, at the University of Urbino and at NABA in Milan.

Currently, he is a teacher at the Fine Art Academy of Urbino, at the University of Udine and in other institutions. Since 2008, he has been working as a supervisor in the (M)T-Node PhD Research Program of the Planetary Collegium (University of Plymouth), and in May 2013 he was appointed as (M)T-Node's DoS (Director of Studies).

His theoretical activity is concerned with the technologies of representation and communication, with the technoscience-based art forms, and with media archaeology studies. In the field of applied research, he works on the opportunities of social relationships raised by online communications and new media.

Capucci authored three books on virtual reality, arts and communication between 1993 and 1996.

He has published more than 300 texts in books, magazines and conference papers in Italy and abroad. He has organized exhibitions, managed projects and participated to many conferences. He has been working in European projects on technological communications. From 2004 to 2007 and from 2009 to 2011 he has been in the International Advisory Board of Ars Electronica of the Net Communities category.

In 1994, Capucci founded and directed one of the first Italian online magazine, NetMagazine, later MagNet, a research project on the relations between culture and technologies made in conjunction with the universities of Bologna and Rome "La Sapienza".

In 2000, he founded Noemalab.eu website devoted to culture-new technologies interrelations and influences and became its editor-in-chief. In 2004, Capucci founded <mediaversi>, a book series which he is the director of, coproduced by Noema and published by Clueb University Press, focused on new media, arts, sciences, technologies and society, with an international Scientific Committee. In 2012 he founded fivewordsforthefuture, a project which aims at helping to recognize and understand what is "new", innovation, to imagine the future. In 2017 in Bologna he designed, curated and coordinated art*science 2017/Leonardo 50 – The New and History, an International Conference on the relations between art and science, which also celebrated the 50th anniversary of Leonardo journal, published by MIT Press.

His theoretical activity is concerned with techniques and technologies of representation and communication in the communication and art realms, with the technoscience-based art forms and with the media archaeology studies. In the field of applied research he works on the opportunities of social relationships raised by online communications and new media.

== Books ==
- Capucci, Pier Luigi (1993). Realtà del virtuale. Rappresentazioni tecnologiche, comunicazione, arte [Reality of the virtual. Technological representations, communication, art)] (in Italian). Bologna: Clueb. ISBN 88-8091-215-1. (republished in 2015 as eBook)
- Capucci, Pier Luigi (1994). Il corpo tecnologico. L'influenza delle tecnologie sul corpo e sulle sue facoltà [The technological body. Technologies’ influence on the body and its faculties] (in Italian). Bologna: Baskerville. ISBN 978-88-800-0008-2.
- Capucci, Pier Luigi (1996). Arte e tecnologie. Comunicazione estetica e tecnoscienze [Art and technologies. Aesthetic communication and technosciences] (in Italian). Bologna: Ed. dell'Ortica. ISBN 978-88-909189-0-2.
