= Wagner Schwartz =

Brazilian performance artist, dancer, choreographer, writer (born 1972)

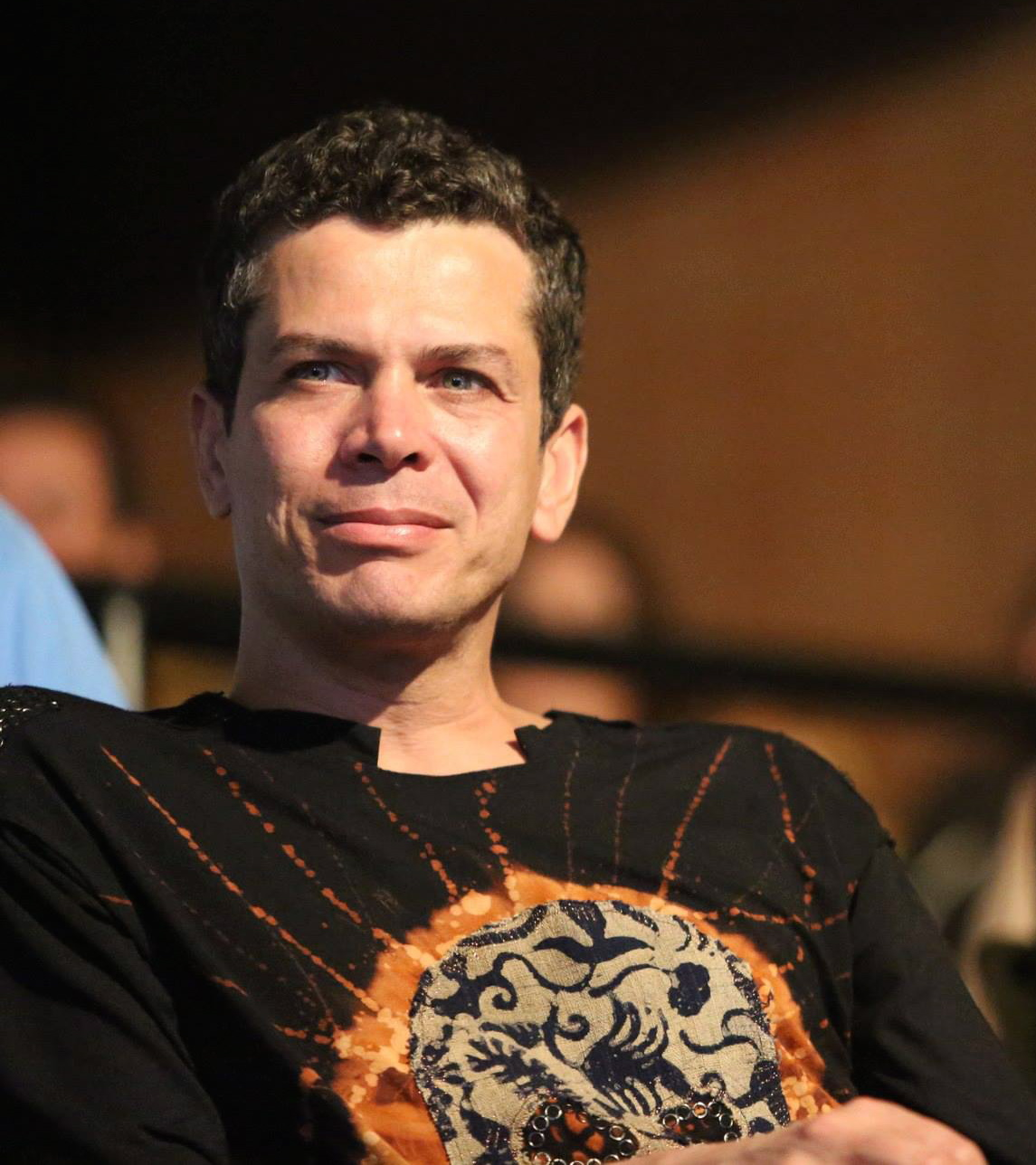
Wagner Schwartz in 2014

Wagner Miranda Schwartz (born 2 December 1972) is a Brazilian performance artist, dancer, choreographer and writer.

== Early life and education ==
Schwartz was born in Volta Redonda, in the state of Rio de Janeiro. He began his studies of popular music and drama in Volta Redonda's public schools. Later, at the Federal University of Uberlândia, located in Minas Gerais, Schwartz studied modernist literature and art, which influences his approach to choreography, receiving the award of the Art Foundation Itau Cultural in 2000–2001, 2003–2004, 2009–2010, 2014.

== Career ==
In 2005 and 2009, Schwartz collaborated with the choreographer Rachid Ouramdane in Cover, Des témoins ordinaires, working, during those years, in Paris, São Paulo and Berlin.

In 2017, his performance of La Bête in the São Paulo Museum of Modern Art sparked controversy in Brazil and abroad, when naked, Schwartz was touched on the foot by a child of approximately four years of age.

== Personal life ==
Schwartz resides in São Paulo and Paris.

== Performances ==
- 2020 – Tumba
- 2019 – Playlist, with Lorenzo De Angelis
- 2019 – A Boba (Silly Woman)
- 2018 – Public Domain, with Elisabete Finger, Maikon K and Renata Carvalho
- 2014 – Mal Secreto
- 2010 – Piranha
- 2008 – Placebo 2008
- 2006 – Placebo
- 2005 – La Bête
- 2004 – Wagner Ribot Pina Miranda Xavier Le Schwartz Transobjeto (European premiere, 2005, at the festival "Move Berlim", in Berlin)
- 2003 – Finita

== Collaborations ==
- 2016 – Bird in a Zoo, with Pierre Droulers and Stefan Dreher (Brussels)
- 2015 – Un petit peu de Zelda (remix), by Yves-Noël Genod (Paris)
- 2012 – Questions and Their Opposite, with Gustavo Bitencourt and Sheila Ribeiro (Curitiba)
- 2012 – Chic by Accident, by Yves-Noël Genod, with Jeanne Balibar (Paris)
- 2009 – The Ordinary Witness, by Rachid Ouramdane (Paris)
- 2005 – Cover, by Rachid Ouramdane (Paris)
- 2005 – Mein Raum?, with Natali Fari and Ricardo de Paula (Berlin)
- 2003 – What You Wish, What You Want, Here I Am Ready to Serve You, by Cláudia Müller (Torres Vedras)

== Books ==
- 2023 – A nudez da cópia imperfeita (Editora Nós) ISBN 978-8569020882
- 2018 – Nunca juntos mas ao mesmo tempo / Jamais ensemble mais en même temps (Editora Nós) ISBN 9788569020349

== Films ==
- 2018 – Le genre international, directed by Judith Cahen and Masayasu Eguchi with Maria de Medeiros
- 2009 – I Needed to Get Some Time, with Rachid Ouramdane
- 1996 – The Poet, Filminute: The International One-Minute Film Festival, directed by Waltuir Alves

== Prizes ==
- 2024 – Finalist for the São Paulo Prize for Literature (category: "Best Novel of 2023", with the book A nudez da cópia imperfeita [The Nudity of the Imperfect Copy])
- 2021 – Fundação Daniel and Nina Carasso / Cité des Arts, Paris
- 2013 – Prêmio Funarte de Dança Klauss Vianna
- 2012 – Best Artistic Project of 2012 for Piranha, by the São Paulo Art Critics Association
- 2012 – Funarte Klauss Vianna Dance
- 2011 – Prêmio Funarte Klauss Vianna 2011
- 2010 – Rumos Itaú Cultural Dance
- 2006 – Funarte Klauss Vianna Dance
- 2005 – Território Minas, FID (Dance International Forum)
- 2003 – Rumos Itaú Cultural Dance
- 2003 – XVI Festival de Dança do Triangulo
- 2000 – Rumos Itaú Cultural Dance
- 1996 – The International One-Minute Film Festival

== Olhares sobre o Corpo [OsC] Festival ==
In 2004, he created, together with Fernanda Bevilaqua, the festival Olhares sobre o Corpo [OsC] ("Perspectives on the Body"). A meeting between artists, students and the people interested on the contemporary relationship in dance, visual arts and performance.
