= The Amina Profile =

- Directed by: Sophie Deraspe
- Written by: Sophie Deraspe
- Produced by: Isabelle Couture; Nathalie Cloutier
- Starring: Sandra Bagaria
- Cinematography: Sophie Deraspe
- Edited by: Geoffrey Boulangé; Sophie Deraspe
- Music by: Sam Shalabi
- Production companies: National Film Board; Esperamos
- Distributed by: National Film Board; F3M
- Release dates: January 24, 2015 (Sundance); July 24, 2015
- Running time: 84 minutes
- Country: Canada
- Languages: English; French; Arabic

The Amina Profile (French: Le profil Amina) is a 2015 Canadian documentary film directed by Sophie Deraspe and coproduced by Esperamos and the National Film Board of Canada, which premiered at the 2015 Sundance Film Festival in the World Cinema category. It was pitched at Sheffield Doc/Fest's MeetMarket in 2014. The film was retitled A Gay Girl in Damascus: The Amina Profile by its U.S. distributor IFC for the theatrical release and for subsequent film festival screenings.

== Synopsis ==
The film centres on Sandra Bagaria, a Montreal woman who was in an online relationship with star blogger Amina Abdallah Arraf al Omari. Bagaria became involved in the international attempt to rescue Arraf after her purported abduction by the Syrian regime.

== Reception ==
Under its French title, Le profil Amina, the film was named Best Documentary:Society at the 2016 Prix Gémeaux, honouring the best in francophone Canadian television.

The film received Canadian Screen Award nominations for Best Feature Length Documentary and Best Editing in a Documentary at the 4th Canadian Screen Awards.

It was shortlisted for the Prix collégial du cinéma québécois in 2016.

== See also ==
- List of lesbian, gay, bisexual or transgender-related films of 2015
- List of LGBT films directed by women
