= The Final Act (film) =

2026 Canadian documentary film

- French: Le Dernier acte
- Directed by: Sophie Deraspe
- Produced by: François Bonneau; Isabelle Couture
- Production company: ACPAV
- Distributed by: Maison 4:3
- Release date: September 2026 (TIFF)
- Country: Canada
- Language: French

The Final Act (French: Le Dernier acte) is a Canadian documentary film, directed by Sophie Deraspe and slated for release in 2026. The film profiles various people impacted by medical assistance in dying, including people arranging their own deaths and people coping with the choices of their loved ones.

The film's production received funding from Telefilm Canada in 2024.

The film is slated to premiere in the TIFF Docs program at the 2026 Toronto International Film Festival. Commercial release is slated for winter 2027.
