= Missing Victor Pellerin =

2016 Canadian drama film

- French: Rechercher Victor Pellerin
- Directed by: Sophie Deraspe
- Written by: Sophie Deraspe; Denis Langlois
- Produced by: Luc Déry; Serge Noël; Douglas Bensadoun
- Starring: Eudore Belzile; Élisabeth Legrand; Anne Lebeau; Éric Devlin
- Cinematography: Sophie Deraspe
- Edited by: Sophie Deraspe
- Music by: Julien Roy
- Production companies: Les Films Siamois; Darling Films
- Distributed by: Atopia Films
- Release date: October 18, 2016 (FNC)
- Running time: 102 minutes
- Country: Canada
- Language: French

Missing Victor Pellerin (French: Rechercher Victor Pellerin) is a Canadian mockumentary film directed by Sophie Deraspe and released in 2016. The film centres on the mystery of Victor Pellerin, a visual artist from Montreal who burned all of his art and disappeared in 1990, on the occasion of a 2005 gallery show exhibiting artwork by other figures who had been influenced by him.

The cast consists principally of real figures in Montreal's arts scene playing fictionalized versions of themselves, including Eudore Belzile, Élisabeth Legrand, Anne Lebeau, Éric Devlin, Olga Korper, Julien Poulin, Alain Lacoursière, Mathieu Beauséjour, Sheila Ribeiro, Sylvain Bouthillette, Maria-Luisa Fernandes, Plastik Patrick and Jean-Frédéric Messier.

The film premiered at the 2006 Festival du nouveau cinéma, where it received a special mention from the Association québécoise des critiques de cinéma.

== Critical response ==
Geoff Pevere of the Toronto Star wrote that "Slowly, slyly, Missing Victor Pellerin metamorphoses from a verite-style mystery about a missing artist to a satirical meditation on the nature of fraudulence itself. Ultimately, nothing is offered as what it seems, a suitably foggy philosophical state for a missing person mystery set in the over-inflated, scam-ridden art market of the 1980s. You may find yourself on to Missing Victor Pellerin's own game long before it's over, but that shouldn't prevent you from enjoying the either the skill with which its played or appreciate the legitimacy of the con itself."

For The Globe and Mail, Rick Groen wrote that "they're acting quite well, so convincingly that the line between the real and the fake is hard to draw, and growing even harder with our dawning realization that, when it comes to discussing Victor Pellerin -- his charisma, his manipulative nature, his checkered past, his larcenous tendencies -- even the real folks are acting. Brilliantly, then, Deraspe plugs into three traits in the viewing audience: (1) our gullibility, born of our uncertainty about who's who in this incestuous but reputedly important enclave; (2) our unwillingness to admit to that naiveté, to what we don't know; and (3) our instinctive responsiveness to cozy stereotypes (the tortured artist) and to easy conventions (the standard-issue doc about the tortured artist)."
