= Telematic art =

Art using telecommunications networks

Telematic art is a term for art projects using computer-mediated telecommunications networks as their medium. Telematic art challenges the traditional relationship between active viewing subjects and passive art objects by creating interactive, behavioural contexts for remote aesthetic encounters. The term telematics (French: télématique) was coined by Simon Nora and Alain Minc in their 1978 report L'Informatisation de la société, published in English in 1980 as The Computerization of Society. Roy Ascott sees telematic art as transforming the viewer into an active participant in the creation of an artwork that remains in process throughout its duration. Ascott had proposed artistic collaboration through telecommunications networks by the 1960s and produced the international networked project Terminal Art in 1980.

== Pioneering experiments ==
An early example of art involving telecommunications is László Moholy-Nagy's 1923 series known as the Telephone Pictures. Moholy-Nagy later wrote that he had ordered the works from an enamel factory by telephone, giving instructions for their production. By having the works mechanically produced rather than making them by hand, he emphasized the artist's role as a producer of concepts rather than as a craftsman. In 1932, Bertolt Brecht argued in his essay "The Radio as an Apparatus of Communication" that radio should move beyond one-way broadcasting and become a two-way medium in which listeners could also participate. Art historian Edward A. Shanken has authored several historical accounts of telematic art, including "From Cybernetics to Telematics: The Art, Pedagogy, and Theory of Roy Ascott".

In 1977, Kit Galloway and Sherrie Rabinowitz's Satellite Arts Project: A Space with No Geographical Boundaries used satellite transmission and video-keying techniques to bring live dancers in separate locations in California and Maryland into a shared composite image. A later scholarly history describes the project as the first known example of a telematic performance event.

In 1980, Ascott organized Terminal Art, an international computer-conferencing project that linked artists in the United States and the United Kingdom through Jacques Vallée's Infomedia NOTEPAD system. Participants used portable terminals to contribute ideas from their own studios. Ascott undertook similar projects, such as Ten Wings, which was part of Robert Adrian's The World in 24 Hours in 1982. In 1983, Ascott created La Plissure du Texte: A Planetary Fairy Tale for the Electra exhibition at the Musée d'Art Moderne de la Ville de Paris. Using the ARTEX computer network, participants in geographically dispersed locations collaboratively improvised an open-ended narrative. Ascott described this process as "distributed authorship".

== Minitel and telematic art in France ==
Minitel, the French videotex system, was tested in 1980, introduced nationally in 1982, and discontinued in 2012. Artists began experimenting with the system while it was still in its early stages.

Early French experiments included Fred Forest's participatory installation Bourse de l'imaginaire at the Centre Georges Pompidou in 1982, which incorporated Minitel terminals while the service was still in its experimental phase. In 1983, Jacques-Élie Chabert, Camille Philibert, Jean-René Bader, and Jean-Paul Martin presented ASCOO, an interactive novel for Minitel, at the Electra exhibition at the Musée d'Art Moderne de la Ville de Paris. In 1984, ORLAN, Frédéric Develay, and Frédéric Martin created Art Accès, a telematic art magazine that brought together visual artists, writers, poets, and musicians working specifically with the Minitel medium. Minitel-based artistic practices have subsequently been examined in relation to later network art, collaborative media, and social-media practices.

== See also ==
- Planetary Collegium
- Poietic Generator
