= Roy Ascott =

English cybernetic artist

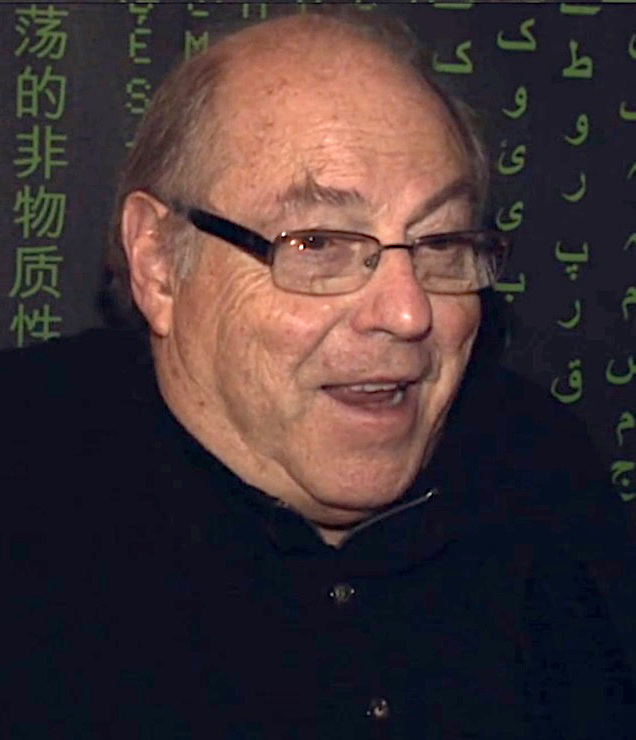
- Roy Ascott in 2012
- Born: Roy Ascott; 26 October 1934 (age 92); Bath, Somerset, England
- Education: King's College London, University of Durham (now Newcastle University)
- Known for: art, technoetics, syncretism
- Notable work: La Plissure du Texte, Electra, Paris; Planetary Network, XLII Venice Biennale; Telematic Embrace: visionary theories of art, technology and consciousness, University of California Press; 未来就是现在:艺术,技术和意识 [The Future is Now: Art, Technology, and Consciousness], Gold Wall Press, Beijing, 2012
- Movement: Technoetics, Digital Art
- Awards: Doctor Honoris Causa, Ionian University, Corfu, Greece. Honorary Professor, Aalborg University. Fellow of the Royal Society of Arts London. Prix Ars Electronica Golden Nica Award for Visionary Pioneers of Media Art 2014.

Roy Ascott FRSA (born 26 October 1934) is a British artist, who works with cybernetics and telematics on an art he calls technoetics by focusing on the impact of digital and telecommunications networks on consciousness. Since the 1960s, Ascott has been a practitioner of interactive computer art, electronic art, cybernetic art and telematic art.

Ascott exhibits internationally (including the Biennales of Venice and Shanghai), and is collected by Tate Britain and Arts Council England. He is recognised by Ars Electronica as the "visionary pioneer of media art", and widely seen as a radical innovator in arts education and research, having occupied leading academic roles in England, Europe, North America, and China, and is currently leading his Technoetic Arts studio in Shanghai, and directing the Planetary Collegium. In 2018, he became the subject of Cybernetics & Human Knowing: A Journal of Second Order Cybernetics, Autopoiesis and Cybersemiotics entitled "A Tribute to the Messenger Shaman: Roy Ascott". Dr. Kate Sloan's comprehensive study of his early work "Art Cybernetics and Pedagogy in Post-War Britain: Roy Ascott's Groundcourse" was published by Routledge in 2019.In 2025 Ascott was the subject of a comprehensive interview at Artforum that was conducted by Hans-Ulrich Obrist.

Ascott is the President of the Planetary Collegium, Professor of Technoetic Arts Plymouth University, and the De Tao Master of Technoetic Arts at the De Tao Masters Academy in Shanghai. He is also Chief Specialist of the Visual Art Innovation Institute at the Central Academy of Fine Arts in Beijing. He is the founding editor of the research journal Technoetic Arts, an honorary editor of Leonardo Journal, and author of the book Telematic Embrace: Visionary Theories of Art, Technology and Consciousness, University of California Press.

== Biography ==
Roy Ascott was born in Bath, England. He was educated at the City of Bath Boys' School. His National Service was spent as a Pilot Officer in RAF Fighter Command working with radar defense systems. From 1955 to 1959, he studied Fine Art at King's College, University of Durham (now Newcastle University) under Victor Pasmore and Richard Hamilton, and Art History under Lawrence Gowing and Quentin Bell. He was awarded the degree of B.A. Hons Fine Art, Dunelm in 1959. On graduation he was appointed Studio Demonstrator (1959–61). He then moved to London, where he established the radical Groundcourse at Ealing Art College, which he subsequently established at Ipswich Civic College, in Suffolk, working with artist tutors such as Anthony Benjamin, Bernard Cohen. R. B. Kitaj, Brian Wall, Harold Cohen, and Peter Startup. Important to the development of his understanding of cybernetics was his friendship with Gordon Pask. Notable alumni of the Groundcourse include Brian Eno, Pete Townshend, Stephen Willats, and Michael English.

Ascott taught in London Ealing, and was a visiting lecturer at other London art schools throughout the 1960s. He was then briefly was President of Ontario College of Art, now OCAD University, Toronto and then Chair of Fine Art at Minneapolis College of Art and Design before moving to California as Vice-President and Dean of San Francisco Art Institute, during the 1970s. He was Professor for Communication Theory at the University of Applied Arts Vienna, during the 1980s, and Professor of Technoetic Arts at the University of Wales, Newport in the 1990s, where he established the Centre for Advanced Inquiry in the Interactive Arts. He established the Planetary Collegium in 2003.

Ascott is recipient of the Prix Ars Electronica Golden Nica award for Visionary Pioneer of Media Art 2014. The award is for "those men and women whose artistic, technological and social achievements have decisively influenced and advanced the development of new artistic directions." He is a Doctor Honoris Causa of Ionian University, Corfu, Greece; Honorary Professor at Aalborg University Copenhagen; Honorary Professor at University of West London.

== Education and research ==
He has advised new media arts organizations in Brazil, Japan, Korea, Europe and North America as well as UNESCO, and was Visiting Professor (VI), Design Media Arts, University of California Los Angeles (2003–07) at the UCLA School of the Arts. Ascott was an International Commissioner for the XLII Venice Biennale of 1986 (Planetary Network and Laboratorio Ubiqua).

== Planetary Collegium ==
He is the founding president of the Planetary Collegium, an advanced art research center which he launched in 1994, with its Hub currently based in the University of Plymouth, UK, and nodes in China, Greece, Italy, and Switzerland. In March 2012 he was appointed De Tao Master of Technoetic Arts at (DTMA), a high-level, multi-disciplined, creativity-oriented higher education institution in Shanghai, China. In 2014, he established the Ascott Technoetic Arts Studio at DTMA, creating the Technoetic Arts advanced degree programme, taught jointly with the Shanghai Institute of Visual Art. The DeTao-Node of the Planetary Collegium was established in 2015. He is a Doctor Honoris Causa of Ionian University, Corfu, Greece.

== Art ==
In his first show in 1964 at the Molton Gallery, London, he exhibited Analogue Structures and Diagram Boxes, comprising aleatory chance operation paintings and other chance operation works in wood, perspex and glass.

In 1964, Ascott published "Behaviourist Art and the Cybernetic Vision" in Cybernetica: Journal of the International Association for Cybernetics (Namur). In 1968, he was elected Associate Member of the Institution of Computer Science, London (proposed by Gordon Pask) and in 1972, he became a Fellow of the Royal Society of Arts.

== Interactive computer art ==
Since the 1960s, Ascott has been working with interactive art, computer art, telematic art, and systems art. Ascott built a theoretical framework for approaching interactive artworks, which brought together certain characteristics of Dada, Surrealism, Fluxus, Happenings, and Pop Art with the science of cybernetics. He was also influenced by the writings of Gordon Pask, Stafford Beer, William Ross Ashby, and F.H. George.

== International exhibitions ==
Ascott has shown at the Venice Biennale, Shanghai Biennale, Electra Paris, Ars Electronica, V2 Institute for the Unstable Media, Milan Triennale, Biennale do Mercosul, Brazil, European Media Festival, and gr2000az at Graz, Austria. His first telematic project was La Plissure du Texte (1983), an online work of "distributed authorship" involving artists around the world. The second was his "gesamtdatenwerk" Aspects of Gaia: Digital Pathways across the Whole Earth (1989), an installation for the Ars Electronica Festival in Linz, discussed by (inter alia) Matthew Wilson Smith in The Total Work of Art: from Bayreuth to Cyberspace, New York: Routledge, 2007.

Retrospective exhibitions of his work were shown in May 2009 at Plymouth Arts Centre, England, then in the Incheon International Digital Arts Festival in Incheon, South Korea in September 2010, and at SPACE (studios) in Hackney, London in 2011. Syncretic Cybernetics, a comprehensive exhibition of his work, was featured in the 9th Shanghai Biennale 2012. Roy Ascott: The Analogues (featuring his work of the 1960s) was shown at the Plug-in Institute of Contemporary Arts, Winnipeg, July–Sept 2013. In September 2014, a mini retrospective of his work was shown in Linz, at the time of his Ars Electronica Golden Nica award. He discussed his work on Geran TV.

The seminal work of 1962, "Video-Roget" was acquired in 2014, by the Tate Gallery, London for its permanent collection. Two key works were included in "Electronic Superhighway", at the Whitechapel Gallery, London in 2016. "Art in Europe 1945–68" shown in ZKM, Karlsruhe, Germany Oct 2016/ Jan 2017, included his "Change-painting 1966". His early work was the subject of the exhibition "Roy Ascott: Form has Behaviour", at the Henry Moore Institute, Leeds, Jan/Apr 2017.

== Books authored by Roy Ascott ==
- The Future is Now: Art, Technology, and Consciousness. 2012. Beijing: Gold Wall Press.2012
- Telematic Embrace: Visionary Theories of Art, Technology, and Consciousness. Ed. and Intro. by Edward A. Shanken. Berkeley: University of California Press. 2003.
- Technoetic Arts (trans: YI, Won-Kon), (Media & Art Series no. 6, Institute of Media Art, Yonsei University). Yonsei: Yonsei University Press. 2002.
- Art & Telematics: toward the Construction of New Aesthetics. (trans: E. Fujihara). Tokyo: NTT Publishing Co. 1998.

== Books edited by Roy Ascott ==
- Ascott, R., Girao, L. M. (eds). Presence in the Mindfield: art, identity, and the technology of transformation. Aveiro, Portugal: Universidade deAveiro. 2011.
- Ascott, R., Gangvik, E., Jahrmann, M. (eds). Making Reality Really Real. Trondheim: TEKS. 2010.
- Ascott, R., Bast, G., Fiel, W. (eds). New Realities: Being Syncretic. Vienna: Springer. 2009.
- Ascott, R. (ed). Engineered Nature: art and consciousness in the post-biological era. Bristol: Intellect Books. 2006.
- Ascott, R. (ed). Art Technology Consciousness. Exeter: Intellect Books. 2000
- Ascott, R. (ed). Reframing Consciousness. Exeter: Intellect Books. 1999
