= The Wolves (2014 film) =

2014 Canadian drama film

- French: Les Loups
- Directed by: Sophie Deraspe
- Written by: Sophie Deraspe
- Produced by: Marc Daigle; Sophie Salbot
- Starring: Evelyne Brochu; Louise Portal; Benoît Gouin
- Cinematography: Philippe Lavalette
- Edited by: Amrita David
- Music by: David Trescos
- Production company: ACPAV
- Distributed by: Les Films Séville
- Release date: December 6, 2014 (Whistler)
- Running time: 107 minutes
- Country: Canada
- Language: French

The Wolves (French: Les Loups) is a Canadian drama film, directed by Sophie Deraspe and released in 2014. Set in Grande-Entrée on the Magdalen Islands of Quebec, the film stars Evelyne Brochu as Élie, a woman who arrives from Montreal during the annual seal hunt and upsets the balance of the community due to her status as an outsider.

The cast also includes Louise Portal, Benoît Gouin, Gilbert Sicotte, Cindy-Mae Arsenault, Augustin Legrand, Patrice Bissonnette, Martin Dubreuil, Stéphane Gagnon, Ungalaaq Avingaq and Marc-André Leblanc.

The film premiered in the Borsos Competition program at the 2014 Whistler Film Festival, and went into commercial release in Quebec in February 2015. It also received international screenings at the Cannes Film Market, and at the 2015 Torino Film Festival, where it was the winner of the International Federation of Film Critics Prize.
