= Sophie Deraspe =

Canadian film director (born 1973)

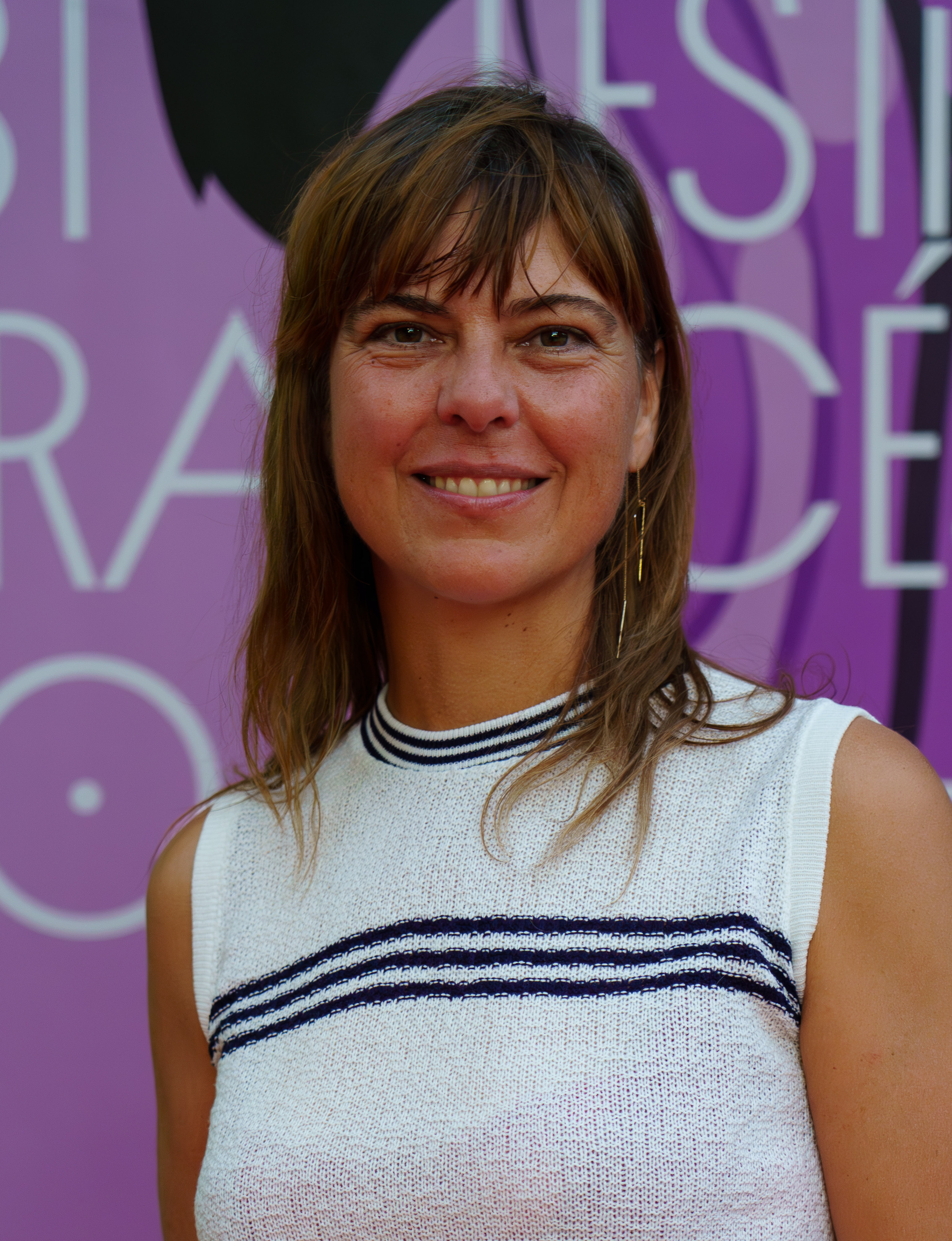
- Sophie Deraspe at the 2025 Malaga French Film Festival
- Born: October 27, 1973 (age 52); Rivière-du-Loup, Quebec, Canada
- Occupations: Film and TV director, scenarist, director of photography and producer
- Years active: 2006—
- Notable work: Antigone, The Amina Profile, Vital Signs

Sophie Deraspe (born October 27, 1973) is a Canadian director, scenarist, director of photography and producer. Prominent in new Quebec cinema, she is known for a 2015 documentary The Amina Profile, an exploration of the Amina Abdallah Arraf al Omari hoax of 2011. She had previously written and directed the narrative feature films Missing Victor Pellerin (Rechercher Victor Pellerin) in 2006, Vital Signs (Les Signes vitaux) in 2009, The Wolves (Les Loups) in 2015,

In 2019 she wrote, directed and shot Antigone, inspired by the 2008 death of Fredy Villanueva in Montreal and loosely adapting the play by Sophocles, saying the story of a woman who defies the law for something greater resonated with her, and she wished to update it. The film, starring Nahéma Ricci, premiered at the 2019 Toronto International Film Festival and won the festival's award for Best Canadian Film. Antigone was chosen to represent Canada in the 2019 Oscars race.

Nominated in 15 categories, her first TV series Dark Soul (Bête noire) won four Gémeaux Awards in 2021, including Best TV Drama Series and Best Director (Drama series). The USA, Australia, France and Norway bought the broadcasting rights and more countries will be added. Her latest TV series, Paradise Motel (Motel Paradis), was first broadcast on Club Illico from October 11, 2022, and streamed via Australia's SBS on Demand from August 2024.

Deraspe characterizes her work, which often deals with contemporary art, as "constantly questioning limits, particularly those related to representation, as well as the boundaries of reality and fiction."

Sophie Deraspe has been invited to join the Academy of Motion Picture Arts and Sciences (AMPAS) in 2020. In 2021 she has received the title Compagne de l'Ordre des arts et des lettres du Québec.

== Biography ==
After studying visual arts in Austria, Sophie Deraspe majored in French literature and then film studies at the Université de Montréal from 1995 to 1998. After graduating with a B.A., she worked as a trainee in the directing department on such seminal Quebec feature films as Philippe Falardeau's debut feature La moitié gauche du Frigo (The Left-Hand Side of the Fridge, 2000) and André Turpin's Le crabe dans la tête (Soft-Shell Man, 2001), and served as director of photography on numerous film and television productions. In 2001 she joined the board of directors of Vidéographe, a Montreal-based artist-run center, serving as chairperson from 2007 to 2008. Also in 2001, her documentary short film Moi, la mer, elle est belle was selected for official competition at the Festival du film francophone de Namur (Belgium). Saute la coche, her fiction short, screened at festivals around the world, winning two prizes.

=== Missing Victor Pellerin (2006) ===
In 2006 Deraspe finished her first independent feature, Missing Victor Pellerin (Rechercher Victor Pellerin) — about a mysterious painter who has disappeared — which was screened at the Museum of Modern Art (New York) and in some twenty national and international festivals. At home, it was the opening night film at the Rendez-vous du cinéma québécois in Québec city – and later at the Quebec Film Week in San Francisco. The film received national distribution in Canada and screened theatrically in New York in 2007, and received a Special Jury Mention (International competition) at the Festival du nouveau cinéma in Montréal.

According to critic Marcel Jean, now director of Cinémathèque québécoise, in the magazine 24 images (no 129), says this about the film: "(...) Both screenwriters, editor, camerawoman and interpreter of Missing Victor Pellerin, Sophie Deraspe plunges completely in this first destabilizing feature film whose discourse - with a non-insignificant resonance - essentially poses the question of appearances. The world is presented as a vast hoax in which the gesture of Victor Pellerin appears scandalous in that it lifts the veil on a corner of this immense deception. The result is promising, too rare being the filmmakers who, from the start, reveal both a real ambition and the ability to make you smile."

Several other critics go to show their positive appreciation: "Is Montrealer Sophie Deraspe's astonishing first film a documentary, mockumentary, cinematic installation piece, true cinema, performance workout, full-on fiction or flat-out hoax? Only one thing is obvious: it is a mind game of museum-worthy proportions." (John Griffin, The Gazette); "A little gem of astonishing ingenuity" (Manon Dumais, Voir); "Without contest, one of the Quebec originals of the year" (Annabelle Nicoud, La Presse); "An uncanny, uncategorizable film... comic yet human." (Charles Petersen, The Village Voice); "An enigmatic and utterly compelling story" (Jeannette Catsoulis, The New York Times).

=== Vital Signs (2009) ===
In 2009 her second feature, Vital Signs (Les signes vitaux), premiered at the Festival of New Cinema (Montreal). It took the prize for Best New Canadian Film at the Whistler Film Festival (Canada), where the film's star, Marie-Hélène Bellavance, was named Best Actress for her debut performance. The film was also screened at the International Film Festival Rotterdam. Writing for The Montreal Gazette, John Griffin praised the film for "superb acting and cinematography." Vital Signs went on to win prizes at several 2010 festivals, including SXSW Film Festival (Austin, Texas); the Internationales Frauenfilmfestival (Cologne, Germany); Polar Lights International Arctic Film Festival (Murmansk, Russia); the Edinburgh International Film Festival and the Festival Internacional de Cine (Monterrey, Mexico); "A must see" (Guillame Fournier, VOIR). The film made the cover of the film magazine Ciné-Bulles (winter 2010) and was ranked fourth best film of 2010 by Ciné-Bulles film magazine. Vital Signs subsequently enjoyed a successful international career in festivals where it won more than 15 awards.

=== The Wolves (2014) ===
2015 was particularly productive for Deraspe, who completed two feature films that year. The Wolves (Les Loups), a Canada-France co-production, brought together Quebec actors Evelyne Brochu, Louise Portal, Benoît Gouin, Gilbert Sicotte and newcomer Cindy-Mae Arsenault, a native of the Magdalen Islands, where the film was shot. The film depicts a young woman who arrives on an island during the spring thaw and sets out to become part of the community of islanders, who earn their livelihood from seal hunting. The Wolves was shown at the Whistler Film Festival, where Louise Portal's performance received a Special Mention, and at the Torino Film Festival in 2015, where the Fipresci jury named it Best Film. The Wolves was also released theatrically in Quebec.

=== The Amina Profile (2015) ===
The Amina Profile, also known in the United States as A Gay Girl in Damascus: The Amina Profile, is the director's first feature-length documentary. After its world premiere at the 2015 Sundance Film Festival, the film was shown at numerous other festivals, winning awards for Best Documentary at TLVFest in Tel Aviv and GAZE in Dublin, Ireland, as well as the Grand Prize at Japan Prize in 2016, before IFC Films acquired the U.S. rights for distribution theatrically and on their digital platform docclub.com [archive]. La Presse gave it 4 1/2 stars, calling it "powerful, brilliant... extremely well constructed", while Variety praised its "slippery, deftly woven narrative.

=== The Seven Last Words (2019) ===
For this 2019 multidisciplinary omnibus project, Sophie Deraspe joined six other directors — musician and composer Kaveh Nabatian, along with Ariane Lorrain, Sophie Goyette, Juan Andrés Arango, Karl Lemieux and Caroline Monnet — to produce a septet of short films all themed on the sayings of Jesus on the cross. Unified by the music of the Callino Quartet, the films were shot in Iran, Haiti, Colombia, Nunavut and Québec in 35mm, 16mm and HD while Marc Boucrot (of Gaspar Noe's Enter the Void and Love) was the film's editor. Justine Smith wrote that Deraspe's short had "the greatest impact" of the seven short films.

=== Antigone (2019) ===
A contemporary adaptation of the Sophocles play, Antigone, written, edited, and directed by Deraspe, revisited the myth in a story of a 16-year-old girl and three siblings who have immigrated to Montreal, Canada with their grandmother after the murder of their parents. When the police kill her older brother and the other brother is threatened with deportation, Antigone struggles to save what remains of her family.

She met with lawyers and investigators to become knowledgeable in the area. This would help her to be able to portray those scenes involving law enforcement with accuracy. At the 2019 Toronto International Film Festival it was named Best Canadian Feature Film and was chosen to represent Canada at the Academy Awards in contention for Best International Feature Film.

=== Dark Soul (2021) ===
Produced by Encore Television for Corus Entertainment's Séries Plus, the six-episode drama series Dark Soul (Bête noire) examines the consequences of a shooting carried out by 16-year-old Jérémy at his school, looking at what drove him to orchestrate such an act of hate and how his grieving family are left to pick up the pieces. With the help of psychiatrist coroner Éliane (Sophie Cadieux) leading the investigation into the case, Jérémy's mother Mélanie (Isabelle Blais) will try to work out how her seemingly trouble-free son came to commit such a terrible crime. The series is notable for the fact it starts in the minutes after the fictional shooting, with viewers never explicitly seeing the events that are at the centre of the story. Nominated in 15 categories, her first TV series Bête Noire (2021) won four Gémeaux Awards, including Best TV Drama Series and Best Director (Drama series). The USA, Australia, France and Norway bought the broadcasting rights and more countries will be added.

=== Motel Paradise ===
In her latest TV series, Motel Paradise, the viewers will follow the journey of Jen, who's, after having near-death experience, no longer believes in the hypothesis of suicide of her 14-year-old sister. Jen will try to convince a retired investigator to reopen the investigation. The series will be broadcast on Club illico in 2023.

=== Shepherds ===
In 2023, it was announced that Deraspe was in production on Shepherds (Berger), a film adaptation of Mathyas Lefebure's novel D'où viens tu, berger?. The film premiered at the 2024 Toronto International Film Festival.

== Filmography ==
=== Director and scenarist ===
==== Feature films ====
- 2006: Missing Victor Pellerin (Rechercher Victor Pellerin)
- 2009: Vital Signs (Les signes vitaux)
- 2014: The Wolves (Les Loups)
- 2015: The Amina Profile (Le profil Amina) - documentary
- 2019: The Seven Last Words
- 2019: Antigone
- 2024: Shepherds (Berger)
- 2026: The Final Act (Le Dernier acte) - documentary

==== Television ====
- 2012: La vie nous arrive (documentary)

=== Director ===
==== TV series ====
- 2021: Dark Soul (Bête noire)
- Motel Paradise (in post-production)

=== Director of photography ===
==== Feature Film ====
- 2006: Missing Victor Pellerin (Rechercher Victor Pellerin)
- 2009: Vital Signs (Les signes vitaux)
- 2014: The Wolves (Les Loups)
- 2015: A Gay Girl in Damascus: The Amina Profile (documentary)
- 2019: The Seven Last Words
- 2019: Antigone

==== Short films ====
- 2000: Solitude dans la foule
- 2007: Pierre Gauvin, un moine moderne

=== Actress ===
==== Film ====
- 2006: Missing Victor Pellerin

==== Television ====
- 2012: Les dames aux caméras (as herself)

== Awards - TV series ==
Year	Festivals / Competitions	Awards / Categories	TV series	Results
2021	Gémeaux Awards	Best Drama Series	Bête Noire (2021)	Won
2021	Gémeaux Awards	Best Direction - Dramatic Series	Bête Noire (2021)	Won

== Awards - Feature Films ==
Year	Festivals / Competitions	Awards / Categories	Feature Films	Results
2021	Quebec's Association of Directors (ARRQ)	Prix RÉAL	Antigone (2019)	Won
2021	Luxembourg City Film Festival	Youth Jury Award	Antigone (2019)	Won
2021	Luxembourg City Film Festival	School Jury Award	Antigone (2019)	Won
2020	Available Light Film Festival	Best Canadian Film (Audience Choice)	Antigone (2019)	Won
2020	8th Canadian Screen Awards	Best Editing	Antigone (2019)	Won
2020	8th Canadian Screen Awards	Best Adapted Screenplay	Antigone (2019)	Won
2020	8th Canadian Screen Awards	Best Motion Picture	Antigone (2019)	Won
2020	8th Canadian Screen Awards	Best Director	Antigone (2019)	Nominee
2020	Film by the Sea International Film Festival	Best Film (International Student Jury Award)	Antigone (2019)	Won
2020	Film Club's The Lost Weekend	Best Director (Lost Weekend Award)	Antigone (2019)	Won
2020	Gala Québec Cinéma	Best Screenplay (Prix Iris)	Antigone (2019)	Won
2020	Gala Québec Cinéma	Best Film (Prix Iris)	Antigone (2019)	Won
2020	Gala Québec Cinéma	Best Directing (Prix Iris)	Antigone (2019)	Won
2020	Gala Québec Cinéma	Best Casting (Prix Iris)	Antigone (2019)	Won
2020	Gala Québec Cinéma	Best Editing (Prix Iris)	Antigone (2019)	Won
2020	Gala Québec Cinéma	Most popular film outside of Quebec (Prix Iris)	Antigone (2019)	Nominee
2020	Ohlalà! Festival de cinema francòfon de Barcelona	Best Feature Film (Jury Prize)	Antigone (2019)	Won
2020	Ohlalà! Festival de cinema francòfon de Barcelona	Best Feature Film (Young Jury Prize)	Antigone (2019)	Won
2020	Ohlalà! Festival de cinema francòfon de Barcelona	Best Film (Audience Award)	Antigone (2019)	Won
2020	Palm Springs International Film Festival	Best International Screenplay (Special Mention)	Antigone (2019)	Won
2020	RamDam Film Festival	Best Fiction Award	Antigone (2019)	Won
2019	Toronto Film Critics Association Awards	Best Canadian Film (Rogers Award)	Antigone (2019)	Nominee
2019	Toronto International Film Festival	Best Canadian Feature Film	Antigone (2019)	Won
2019	Whistler Film Festival	Best Canadian Feature Film (Borsos Competition Award)	Antigone (2019)	Won
2019	Whistler Film Festival	Best Director (Borsos Competition Award)	Antigone (2019)	Won
2019	Whistler Film Festival	Best Screenplay (Borsos Competition Award)	Antigone (2019)	Won
2019	Whistler Film Festival	Best Female-Directed Narrative Feature (Alliance of Women Film Journalists EDA Award)	Antigone (2019)	Won
2019	Whistler Film Festival	Audience Award	Antigone (2019)	Won
2016	Gémeaux Awards	Best Documentary: Society	A Gay Girl in Damascus: The Amina Profile (2015)	Won
2016	Gémeaux Awards	Best Cinematography - Public Affairs and Documentaries (All Categories)	A Gay Girl in Damascus: The Amina Profile (2015)	Nominee
2016	Gémeaux Awards	Best Editing in a Documentary, Public Affairs, Report or Biography Series	A Gay Girl in Damascus: The Amina Profile (2015)	Nominee
2016	Japan Prize	Lifelong Learning Category	A Gay Girl in Damascus: The Amina Profile (2015)	Won
2016	Japan Prize	Grand Prix	A Gay Girl in Damascus: The Amina Profile (2015)	Won
2016	Gala du cinéma québécois	Best Documentary	A Gay Girl in Damascus: The Amina Profile (2015)	Nominee
2015	Dublin Gay & Lesbian Film Festival	Best Documentary Feature (Jury Award)	A Gay Girl in Damascus: The Amina Profile (2015)	Won
2015	Frameline San Francisco International LGBTQ Film Festival	Outstanding Documentary (Honorable Mention)	A Gay Girl in Damascus: The Amina Profile (2015)	Won
2015	Hot Docs Canadian International Documentary Festival	Canadian Documentary (Special Jury Prize)	A Gay Girl in Damascus: The Amina Profile (2015)	Won
2015	LesGaiCineMad, Madrid International LGBT Film Festival	Best Documentary (Jury Prize)	A Gay Girl in Damascus: The Amina Profile (2015)	Won
2015	TLVFest - The Tel Aviv International LGBT Film Festival	Best Documentary Feature (Jury Prize)	A Gay Girl in Damascus: The Amina Profile (2015)	Won
2015	Torino Film Festival	FIPRESCI Prize	Les loups (2014)	Won
2011	Jutra Awards	Best Film	Les signes vitaux (2009)	Nominee
2010	Festival du Film Francophone d'Angoulême (FFA)	Best Film (Valois Magelis)	Les signes vitaux (2009)	Won
2010	International Arctic Polar Lights film festival	Best Fiction Feature Film (Special Jury Prize)	Les signes vitaux (2009)	Won
2010	Internationales Frauen Film Fest	Special Jury Mention	Les signes vitaux (2009)	Won
2010	Monterrey International Film Festival	Best International Feature Film Fiction	Les signes vitaux (2009)	Won
2010	Monterrey International Film Festival	Best Director	Les signes vitaux (2009)	Won
2010	Santiago International Film Festival - SANFIC	Special Mention (International Competition)	Les signes vitaux (2009)	Won
2010	Torino Film Festival	Feature Film (Special Jury Prize)	Les signes vitaux (2009)	Won
2010	Tübingen | Stuttgart International French-language Film Festival	Best Feature Film (International Competition)	Les signes vitaux (2009)	Won
2009	Whistler Film Festival	Best Film (Phillip Borsos Award)	Les signes vitaux (2009)	Won
2006	Montréal Festival of New Cinema	Special Mention	Rechercher Victor Pellerin (2006)	Won

== Distinctions ==
- 2021 - Compagne des arts et des lettres du Québec
- 2020 - Member of the Academy of Motion Picture Arts and Sciences (AMPAS)
- 2015 - Birks Diamond Tribute to the Year's Women in Film (TIFF)

== See also ==
- List of female film and television directors
- List of LGBT-related films directed by women

== Bibliography ==
- DEQUEN, Bruno and Philippe GAJAN (dir.), thematic section titled Renouveau du cinéma québécois, 24 images, no 152, June–July 2011, pp. 4–34.
- DEQUEN, Bruno (organizer) et al., "Table ronde sur le renouveau du cinéma québécois," Nouvelles Vues, no 12 (spring-summer 2011).
- DERASPE, Sophie, "Les signes vitaux, entretien avec Sophie Deraspe," Ciné-Bulles, no 278, Montreal, January 2010.
- FARADJI, Helen, "Nouvelle vague 2.0?", 24 images, Premiers plans blog, February 26, 2009.
- FARADJI, Helen, "Les cordonniers," 24 images, Premiers plans blog, November 4, 2010.
- SIROIS-TRAHAN, Jean-Pierre, "La mouvée et son dehors: renouveau du cinéma québécois," Cahiers du Cinéma, no 660, Paris, October 2010, pp. 76–78.
