= Antonio Caronia =

Italian author (1944–2013)

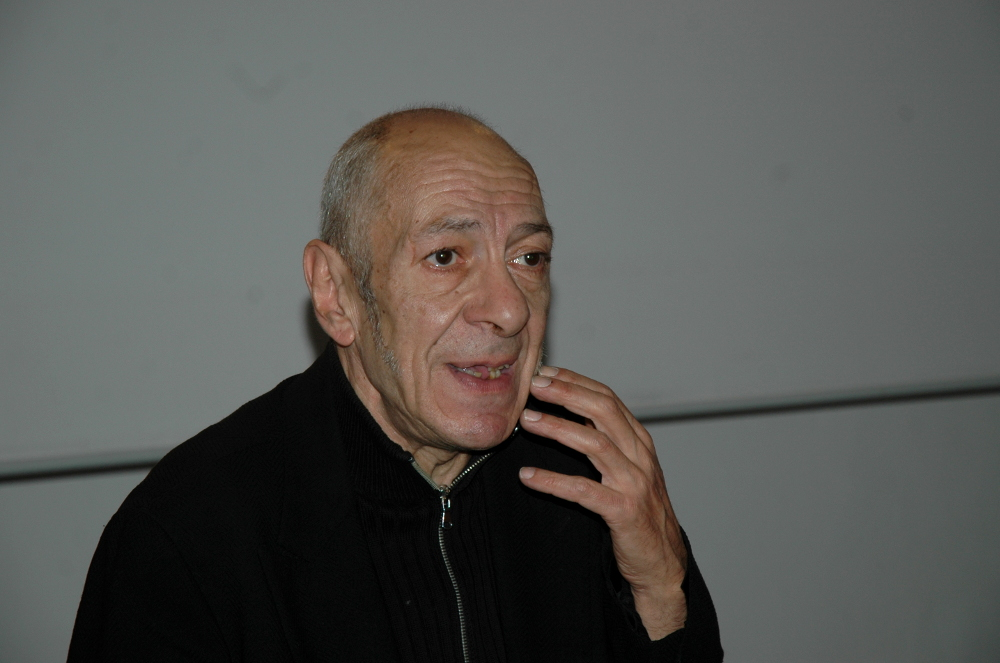
- Born: Antonio Caronia; 1944; Genova, Italy
- Died: 30 January 2013 (aged 68–69); Milan, Italy
- Occupations: Essayist; Literary critic
- Writing career
- Notable work: The Cyborg: a Treatise on the Artificial Man

Antonio Caronia (1944 – 30 January 2013) was an Italian author, essayist, and academic, particularly known for his work in literary criticism, science fiction, and digital culture.

== Biography ==
He graduated in mathematics with a thesis on Noam Chomsky, from 1964 to 1977 he was an active militant in the Italian socialist party PSI, and then in Lega comunista rivoluzionaria IV internazionale, where he started his intellectual career and edited the magazine Bandiera Rossa for two years.

=== An ambiguous utopia ===
In 1978 he became deeply interested in science fiction, taking part in the Milanese group Un'Ambigua Utopia (An ambiguous utopia), inspired by Ursula K. Le Guin's novel The Dispossessed.

=== Collaborations with journals ===
From the mid 1980s, he collaborated as journalist with numerous magazines such as Linus, Corto Maltese, il manifesto, Videomagazine, Virtual, Isaac Asimov's Science Fiction Magazine, Virus mutations, Cyberzone, Millepiani, Linea d'ombra, Pulp Libri, Flesh Out, and Digicult. He also contributed text for MediaMente, a television series dedicated to the world of new technologies, produced by RAI Educazionale.

He published comments, articles and short reflections in Liberazione and il manifesto. Along with Daniele Brolli he was director of the magazine Alphaville. From the 1990s, he collaborated with Mimesis Edizion as author, editorial consultant and director of two editorial series: "Postumani" (Posthumans) and "Fantascienza e società" (Science fiction and society).

=== Academic activity ===
For several years, he was lecturer in Comunication at Accademia di Brera and Aesthetics at NABA, Nuova accademia di belle arti di Milano. He has also been stato director of research of the PhD programme at Planetary Collegium M-Node.

He died in Milan, after a short illness, on 30 January 2013, aged 69.

== Works ==
- Nei labirinti della fantascienza, guida critica, a cura del collettivo "Un'ambigua utopia", Feltrinelli, Milano, 1979
- Il cyborg. Saggio sull'uomo artificiale, Theoria, Roma, 1985
- Digitare se stessi. Il nuovo ‘spazio interno’ in Neuromante di William Gibson; La città e le stelle n. 6, 1987 (ristampato in A.C., Archeologie del virtuale, ombre corte, Verona 2001)
- Variazioni Cosmiche. La fantascienza fra letteratura e immagine, Editrice Nord, Milano, 1988
- I cowboy del computer, L'europeo n. 31, 1990
- Alieni nello spazio qualunque, Il Manifesto, 1990
- Volando volando nella fantasia, La Gazzetta del Mezzogiorno (supplemento Più, Anno II N.5, agosto 1992)
- Philip K. Dick, Attenzione polizia!, Telemaco, 1992
- Sarà virtuale ma è già arte, L'europeo n. 18, 1992
- Cyberpunk: istruzioni per l'uso, Stampe Alternative, Viterbo, 1995
- Il corpo virtuale. Dal corpo robotizzato al corpo disseminato nelle reti, Muzzio, 1996
- Houdini e Faust: breve storia del cyberpunk, Baldini e Castoldi, Milano, 1997, con Domenico Gallo
- Archeologie del virtuale. Teorie, scritture, schermi, Ombre Corte, 2001
- Il cyborg. Saggio sull'uomo artificiale. Milan: ShaKe. 2008. ISBN 978-88-88865-50-8 – via Google Libri.
- Cyborg. La carne e il metallo, Comma 22, 2005, con Franco Berardi e Fabio Zucchella
- La macchina della paranoia. Enciclopedia dickiana (PDF). Milano: Agenzia X. 2006. ISBN 88-95029-09-7. Archived from the original (PDF) on 23 September 2010. with Domenico Gallo
- L'arte nell'era della producibilità digitale, edited by Antonio Caronia, Enrico Livraghi, Simona Pezzano, Mimesis Edizioni, 2007
- Un'ambigua utopia edited by Antonio Caronia and Giuliano Spagnul, Mimesis Edizioni, 2009
- Filosofie di Avatar. Immaginari, soggettività, politiche, edited by Antonio Caronia and Antonio Tursi, Mimesi edizioni, 2010
- Virtuale, Mimesis Edizioni, 2010
- Žižek presenta Trockij. Terrorismo e comunismo, edited by Antonio Caronia, Mimesis Edizioni, 2011
- L'oro nero dei Moratti. Oil secondo tempo, Edizioni Bepress, 2011, with Massimiliano Mazzotta (includes documentary film DVD Oil)
- Nei labirinti della fantascienza, edited by Antonio Caronia and Giuliano Spagnul, Mimesis Edizioni, 2012
- Dal cyborg al postumano. Biopolitica del corpo artificiale, Meltemi edizioni, Milan, 2020

== Bibliography ==
- Mattioli, Valerio (2025). Novanta. Una controstoria culturale. Torino, Italy: Einaudi. ISBN 978-88-06-26623-3.
