= Massimo Canevacci =

Italian academic and ethnographer (born 1942)

Massimo Canevacci (born 1942) is an Italian academic, ethnographer and critical thinker. He is known for his works about contemporary metropolis, 'native' cultures and digital arts. Canevacci is currently based on the Institute of Advanced Studies of the University of São Paulo, Brazil, and he has been living in São Paulo since 2008. He is married to the artist Sheila Ribeiro.

The majority of Canevacci's works are published in Italian and Portuguese. Before moving to Brazil, Canevacci was a Professor of Cultural Anthropology at the Faculty of Communication Sciences of the Sapienza University of Rome. He also directed the Italian magazine 'Avatar' from 2001 to 2006.

Canevacci is known for the development of the concepts of 'communicational metropolis', 'multividual' as well as the tensions between 'self-and hetero-representation'. He is also known for his contribution to the study of digital cultures and his dialogic relationship with 'native' populations such as the Bororo and the Xavante of Central Brazil.

== Biography ==
Canevacci was born in Rome in 1942. He graduated with a thesis about the Frankfurt School and he went on to develop these theories in relation to contemporary transformations of digital communication. His recent works include The Line of Dust: Bororo Culture Between Tradition, Mutation and Self-Representation published in 2013 and Sinkrética - Esplorazioni etnografiche sulle arti contemporanee published in 2014.

== Books in English ==
- The Line of Dust: Bororo Culture Between Tradition, Mutation and Self-Representation, Canon Pyon, Sean Kingston, (2013)

== Books in Italian ==
- Sinkrética - Esplorazioni etnografiche sulle arti contemporanee, Catania, Bonanno, (2014).
- Una stupita fatticità. Feticismi visuali tra corpi e metropoli, Roma, Costa & Nolan, (2007).
- La Linea di Polvere, Roma, Meltemi, (2007).
- Sincretismi. Esplorazioni diasporiche sulle ibridazioni culturali, Roma, Costa & Nolan (2004). Sincretismi. Esplorazioni diasporiche sulle ibridazioni culturali - Massimo Canevacci - Libro - Costa & Nolan - Riscontri | IBS
- Didattica etnografica sperimentale, Roma, Booklet Milano, (2002).
- Culture extreme. Mutazioni giovanili nei corpi delle metropoli, Roma, Meltemi. (2003).
- Antropologia della comunicazione visuale. Feticci, merci, pubblicità, cinema, corpi, videoscape, Roma, Meltemi, (2001)
- La città polifonica. Saggio sull'antropologia della comunicazione urbana, Roma, Seam (1997).
- Minima Viralia. La solitudine non solitaria di un antropologo in quarantena, Roma, Rogas (2020).
