= Technoetics =

Neologism introduced by Roy Ascott

Technoetics is a neologism introduced by Roy Ascott, who coined the term from techne and noetic theory, to refer to the emergent field of technology and consciousness research.

== Definitions ==
The Technoetic relates to that which concerns the technology of consciousness. Such technology may be telematic, digital, genetic, vegetal, moist, or linguistic. The emergence of Technoetics can be juxtaposed with a number of other innovative interdisciplinary areas of scholarship which have surfaced in recent years including: technoscience, technoethics, viractuality, and technocriticism.

Technoetics is a convergent field of practice that seeks to explore consciousness and connectivity through digital, telematic, chemical or spiritual means; embracing both interactive and psychoactive technologies and the creative use of moist-media. -Roy Ascott, Technoetic Art Intellect Books 2003

== History of technoetics ==
Technoetics is a syncretic research area linked to the transdisciplinary methodology between art and science. This is rooted in the research of Roy Ascott and his Planetary Collegium; including its CAiiA-Hub, Trento-Node (Italy), Lucerne-Node (Switzerland), and DeTao-Node (Shanghai, China) research communities.

The term appeared for the first time in 1997 in the Ascott paper: "The Technoetic Aesthetic: Art and the Matter of Consciousness". In: R. Ascott (ed) Consciousness Reframed: art and consciousness in the post-biological era: 1st International CAiiA Research Conference Proceedings published by University of Wales College, Newport. Since 2014, the field and research area of Technoetics is being taught in the Shanghai Institute of Visual Art. The Technoetic arts undergraduate course was created by Roy Ascott and is provided by the Roy Ascott Technoetic Arts Studio and the Detao Masters Academy at the Shanghai Institute of Visual Art.
