= Planetary Collegium =

New media artist collective

The Planetary Collegium (a.k.a. CAiiA / Centre for Advanced Inquiry in Integrative Arts) is an international transcultural and transdisciplinary new media art educational research platform that promotes on the doctorate level the integration of art, science, technology, and consciousness research under the rubric of the technoetic arts. It is based in the School of Art, Design and Architecture department at Plymouth University in the United Kingdom with nodes in Trento, Lucerne and Shanghai. The founding President is Professor Roy Ascott.

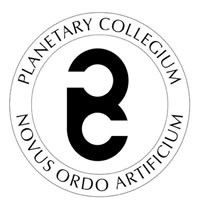
Planetary Collegium logo

== History ==
The Planetary Collegium was conceived and established by Roy Ascott as the Centre for Advanced Inquiry in the Interactive Arts (CAiiA) in 1994 at what is now the University of Wales, Newport

Three years later, Ascott established STAR (Science Technology and Art Research) in the School of Computing, University of Plymouth. CAiiA-STAR constituted a joint research platform, with access to supervisory and technical resources of both universities.

In 2003, Ascott contracted to relocate the platform to Plymouth University, renaming it the Planetary Collegium, where it is currently located in the Faculty of Arts and Humanities.

== Structure ==
As conceived and directed by Ascott, the Planetary Collegium consists of artists, theoreticians and scholars working within the context of transdisciplinarity and syncretism so as to develop their research in the practice and theory of new media art with a special interest in telematics and technoetics. Currently, their doctoral research leads to the award of the University of Plymouth PhD. Post-doctoral research is also pursued.

Currently, the hub of the Collegium, CAiiA-Hub (the Centre for Advanced Inquiry in Integrative Arts) is situated in the School of Art and Media, Faculty of Arts, Plymouth University. The Collegium has a Node De Tao-Node in Shanghai.

== Node Directors ==
- DeTao-Node Shanghai, China. DeTao Masters Academy in Shanghai. Director: Roy Ascott
- T-Node Trento, Italy. Fondazione Ahref. Director: Francesco Monico
- NGL-Node Lucerne, Switzerland. NGL - SAA Neue Galerie Luzern - Swiss Academic Association. Director: René Stettler

== Awards ==
The Collegium was awarded The World Universities Forum Award for Best Practice in Higher Education 2011.

== Collegium President ==
Roy Ascott, Founding President, 2014 Recipient of the Prix Ars Electronica Golden Nica Award for Visionary Pioneer of New Media Art. Doctor Honoris Causa, Ionian University, Corfu, Greece. Honorary Professor, Aalborg University, Denmark. Honorary Professor, West London University, UK. Professor, Shanghai Institute of Visual Arts. DeTao Master of Technoetic Arts, DeTao Masters Academy, Shanghai, China. In 2025 Ascott discussed The Planetary Collegium as part of a comprehensive interview at Artforum conducted by Hans-Ulrich Obrist.

== Collegium Advisory Board ==
- Marco Bischof
- James Gimzewski
- Pierre Lévy
- Luis Eduardo Luna
- Roger Malina
- Ryohei Nakatsu
- Louise Poissant
- Thomas S. Ray
- Marilyn Schlitz
- Barbara Maria Stafford
- Mike Phillips, Principal Supervisor, CAiiA-Node
- Jane Grant, Principal Supervisor, CAiiA-Node
- Jing (Luna) Zhou, Associate Director, DeTao Node

== Advanced Research Associates ==
The Advanced Research Associateship (ARA) involves post-doctoral or advanced practice research. ARAs are required to attend three Composite Sessions within their year of registration, and to participate in the associated international research conferences.

    - CAiiA-Hub:
  - Heather Raikes, University of Washington, Seattle, US (2011–12).
  - Paulo Rodrigues, University of Aveiro, Portugal (2010–11).
  - Wengao Huang, University of Plymouth, UK (2005–06).
  - Cristina Miranda de Almeida, University of the Basque Country. (2005–06).
  - Andrea Gaugusch, University of Vienna, Austria (2003–04).
  - Dene Grigar, Washington State University—Vancouver (2002–04).
  - Katia Maciel, Federal University Rio de Janeiro, Brazil (2001–02).
  - Tania Fraga, University of Brasilia, Brazil (1999–2000).
    - M-Node:
  - Luisa Paraguai, Anhembi Morumbi University, São Paulo, Brazil (2011–12).
  - Gianna Angelini, University of Macerata, Macerata, Italy (2012-)
  - I-Node, Lila Moore,(2014-2015).

== Research Sessions and Public Conferences ==
Sessions and conferences have been hosted by:

- Artspace Media Centre, Dublin (1997)
- La Beneficia Cultural Centre, Valencia (1998)
- CYPRES, Marseille (1999)
- Federal University, Rio de Janeiro (1999)
- University of Arizona, Tucson (2000)
- École Nationale Supérieure des Beaux-Arts, Paris (2000)
- Fondazione Fitzcaraldo, Turin (2001)
- Universitat Oberta de Catalunya, Barcelona (2001)
- University of California DARNet, Santa Cruz and Los Angeles (2001)
- University of Arizona, Tucson (2002)
- Curtin University, Perth, Western Australia (2002)
- IAMAS, Ogaki, Japan (2002)
- The Hochschule fuer Gestaltung und Kunst, Zurich (2003)
- Image Technology Center, Universidade Federal do Rio de Janeiro, Paraciutu and Fortaleza (2003)
- Ciberart, Bilbao (2004)
- School of Software, Peking University, Beijing (2004)
- Texas Woman's University, Dallas (2005)
- University of Plymouth, Plymouth (2005)
- Sabancı University, Istanbul (2005)
- University of Arizona, Tucson (2006)
- University of Plymouth (2006)
- SESC, São Paulo, Brazil (2006)
- Hexagram, Montreal (2007)
- University of Plymouth (2007)
- Nuova Accademia di Belle Arti Milano - NABA (2007)
- LABoral Centro de Arte y Creación Industrial, Gijon, Asturias, Spain (2008)
- Universität für Angewandte Kunst Wien (2007) Vienna, Austria (2008)
- SESC, São Paulo, Brazil (2008)
- La Sala Parpallo Valencia, Spain (2009)
- macromedia hochschule für medien und kommunikation Munich, Germany (2009)
- Artshare, Porto, Portugal (2010)
- Ionion Centre for the Arts and Culture, Kefalonia, Greece (2011)
- CIANT - International Centre for Art and New Technologies, Prague, Czech Republic (2012)
- XARTS - International Conference on Extended Arts - From Virtual to Real, Syros, Greece (2013)
- Witwatersrand University, Johannesburg."Fak'ugesi Digital Africa Conference".214.
- 2016 American University in Cairo, Egypt. "Cairotronica".
