= Ionian University =

Public university in Greece

Coordinates: 39°37′14″N 19°54′56″E

- Ιόνιο Πανεπιστήμιο
- Type: Public higher education institution
- Established: 1984; 42 years ago
- Location: Corfu, Lefkada, Kefalonia, Zakynthos, Greece
- Website: www.ionio.gr

The Ionian University (IU; Greek: Ιόνιο Πανεπιστήμιο) is a university located in the Ionian Islands, Greece. It is one of the newest institutions of Higher Education in Greece, created in 1984 pursuant to presidential order 83/84 Government Gazette 31 Α/20-3-84, along with the University of the Aegean and the University of Thessaly. In 2018, TEI of Ionian islands merged into the Ionian University.

The university opened its doors to students in Corfu in 1985. Until 2018 it consisted of six departments (History, Foreign Languages and Translation, Music Studies, Library, Archival and Museum Studies, Audiovisual Arts, and Informatics). By incorporating and restructuring the Ionian Technological Education Institute, in the academic year 2019-2020 the Ionian University expanded to comprise a total of twelve departments on four islands of the Ionian Sea (Corfu, Lefkada, Kefalonia, Zakynthos), offering undergraduate and postgraduate degree programmes and summer schools.

== History ==
The Ionian Academy was the first Greek University of modern times, established in 1824 by Frederick North, 5th Earl of Guilford. It was in operation in Corfu for forty years, until 1864, up to the Union of the Ionian Islands with the Greek State.

The Ionian University was established in 1984 by the Greek government under the Prime Ministership of Andreas Papandreou in recognition of Corfu's contribution to education in Greece as the seat of the first University of Greece, the Ionian Academy, that was established in 1824, forty years before the cession of the Ionian islands to Greece and just three years after Greece's Revolution of 1821. The Prime Ministership thus kept an election promise to the people of Corfu, satisfying their long held demand that a successor university to the Ionian Academy be built. On 21 May 1985, the founding of the Ionian University was announced in a speech at City-Hall square in Corfu city.

== Faculties and departments ==
The university includes five Faculties (Schools), consisting of twelve Departments.

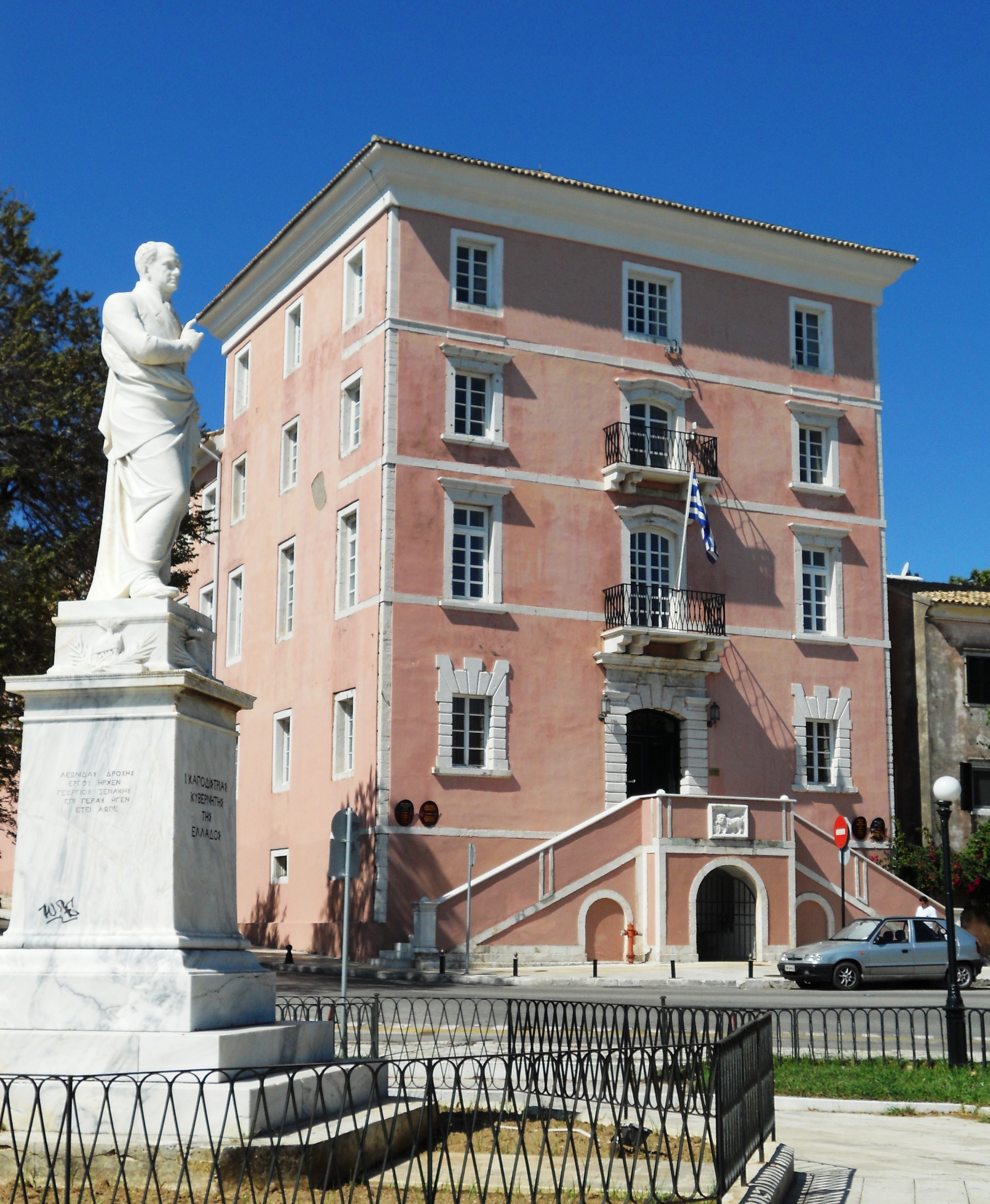
The building of the Ionian Academy

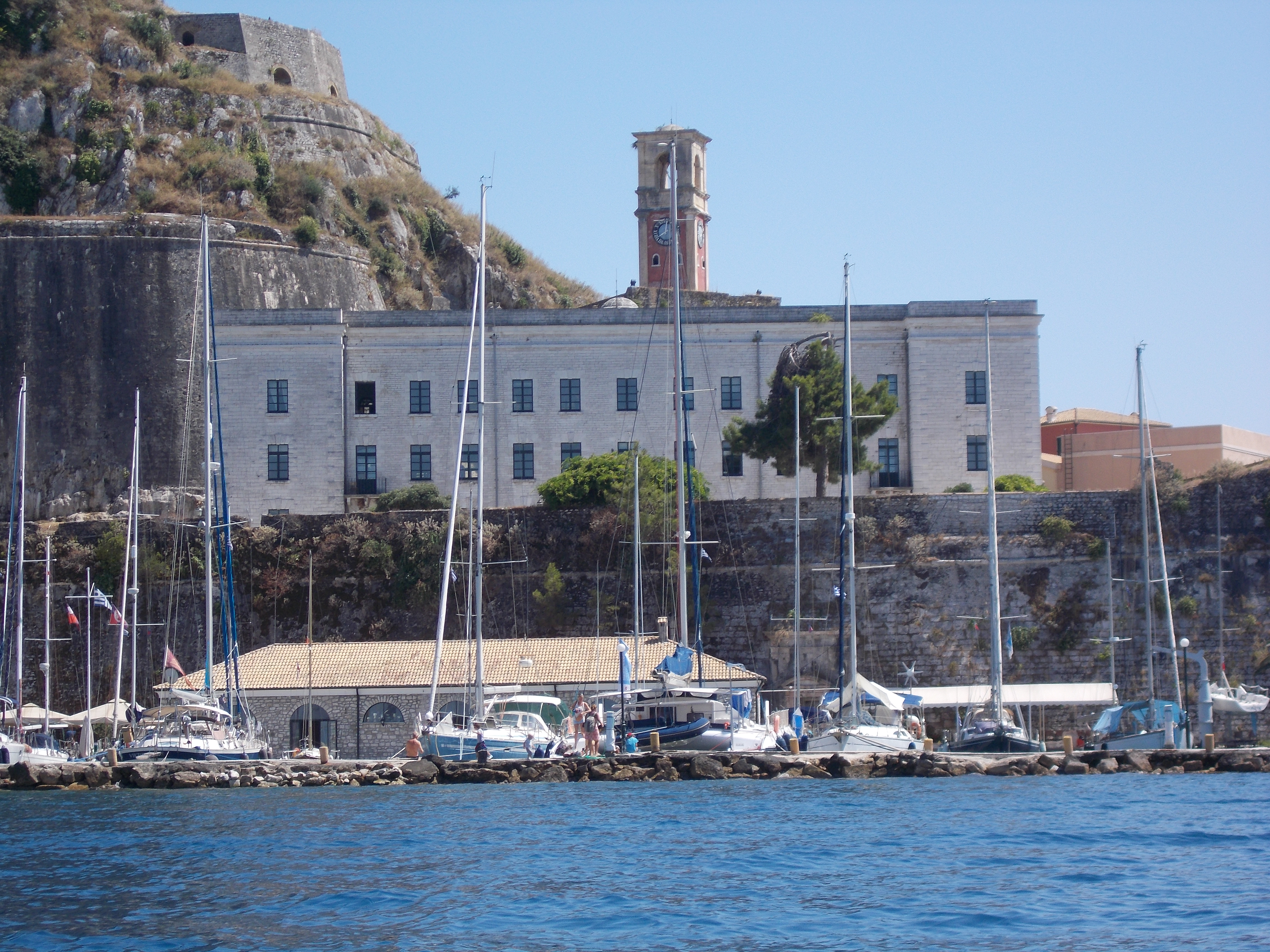
The Building of the Department of Music in the Old Fortress

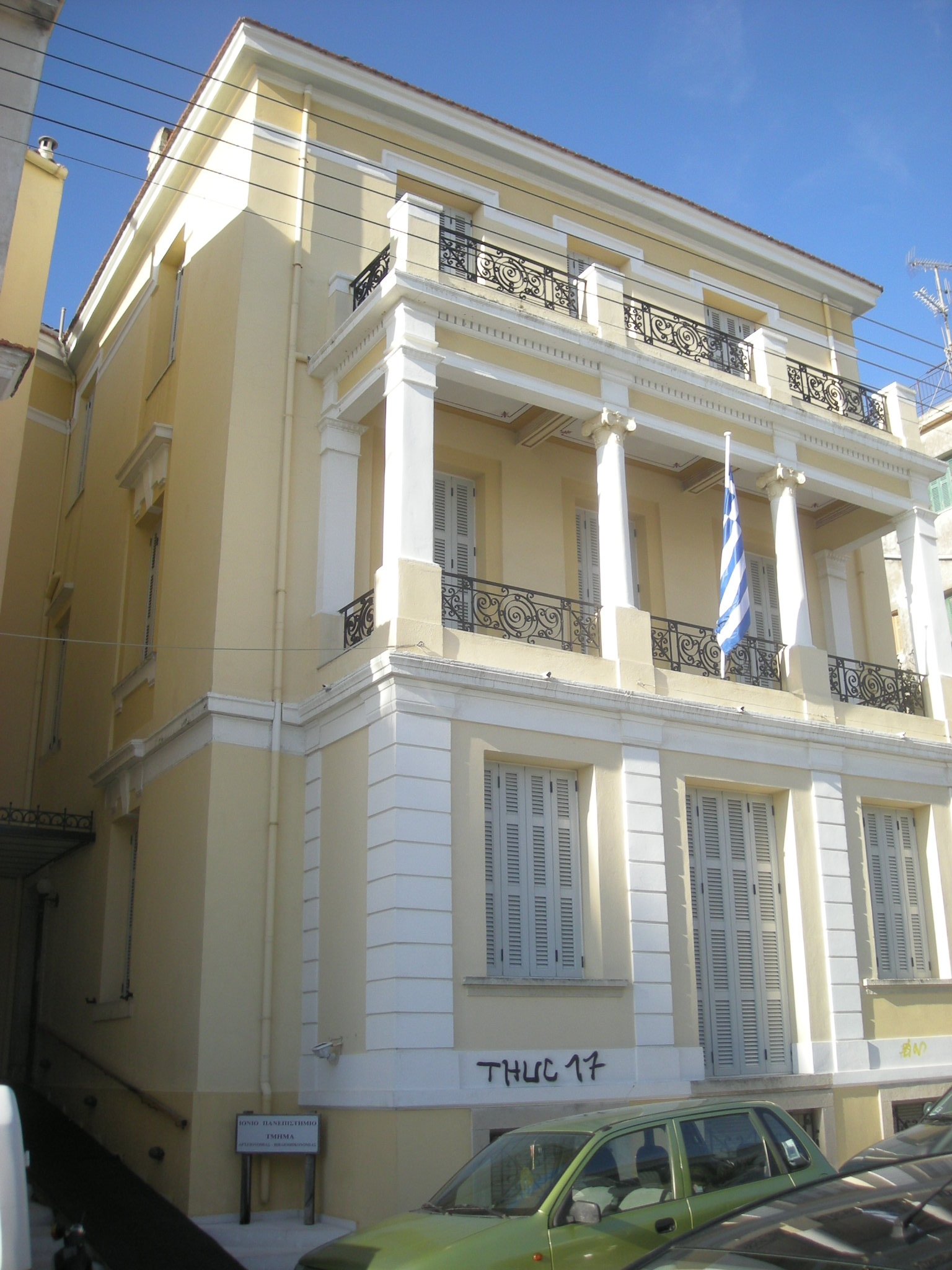
The Building of the Department of Tourism (Old Building of the Department of Archives, Library Studies and Museology)

Schools	Departments
School of Humanities (founded 2013)	Department of History and Digital Humanities (founded 1985); Department of Foreign Languages, Translation and Interpreting (founded 1986)
School of Information Science and Informatics (founded 2013)	Department of Archives, Library Science and Museology (founded 1993); Department of Informatics (founded 2004); Department of Digital Media and Communication (founded 2018)
School of Music and Audiovisual Arts (founded 2013)	Department of Music Studies (founded 1992); Department of Audio and Visual Arts (founded 2004)
School of Environment (founded 2018)	Department of Environment (founded 2018); Department of Food Science and Technology (founded 2018)
School of Economic Sciences (founded 2018)	Department of Tourism (founded 2018)

== Research ==
The Special Account for Research Grants (S.A.R.G.) of the Ionian University was established in 1988 in order to meet the need to manage research grants from various sources that are to be invested in research, educational, training, and developmental projects, as well as other related services or activities which contribute to the establishment of linkages between education, research and the production market.

Up to this day, the Ionian University S.A.R.G. has developed over 160 research projects and educational programmes financed by the European Committee, International Organisations, the General Secretariat for Research and Technology, ministries, banks, other state organisations, as well as private institutions.

According to the Senate's decision, the Ionian University S.A.R.G.'s proceeds are used for the students' education, to finance other research projects and serve different purposes, such as the award of scholarships to postgraduate students.

== University units ==
Library

The Ionian University Library, an autonomous and decentralized service, aims to support and promote the teaching, educational, and research activities that take place within the respective graduate and postgraduate programmes of the University Departments. It also aspires at the continuous development and expansion of educational and research objectives, as well as of the broader social role of the Ionian University

The collection of the Ionian University Library comprises more than 114,000 books, 1,300 magazine titles, more than 3,500 audio-visual records such as CDs, cassettes, vinyl records, videotapes, microfilms, a remarkable collection of maps, archives, as well as thousands of digital documents.

Laboratories

The University's laboratories aim at the development of academic research and the promotion of knowledge in their field of expertise. Their activity is based on the fundamental concept of the research-education interrelation and their main goal is to support the graduate and postgraduate studies at the Ionian University.

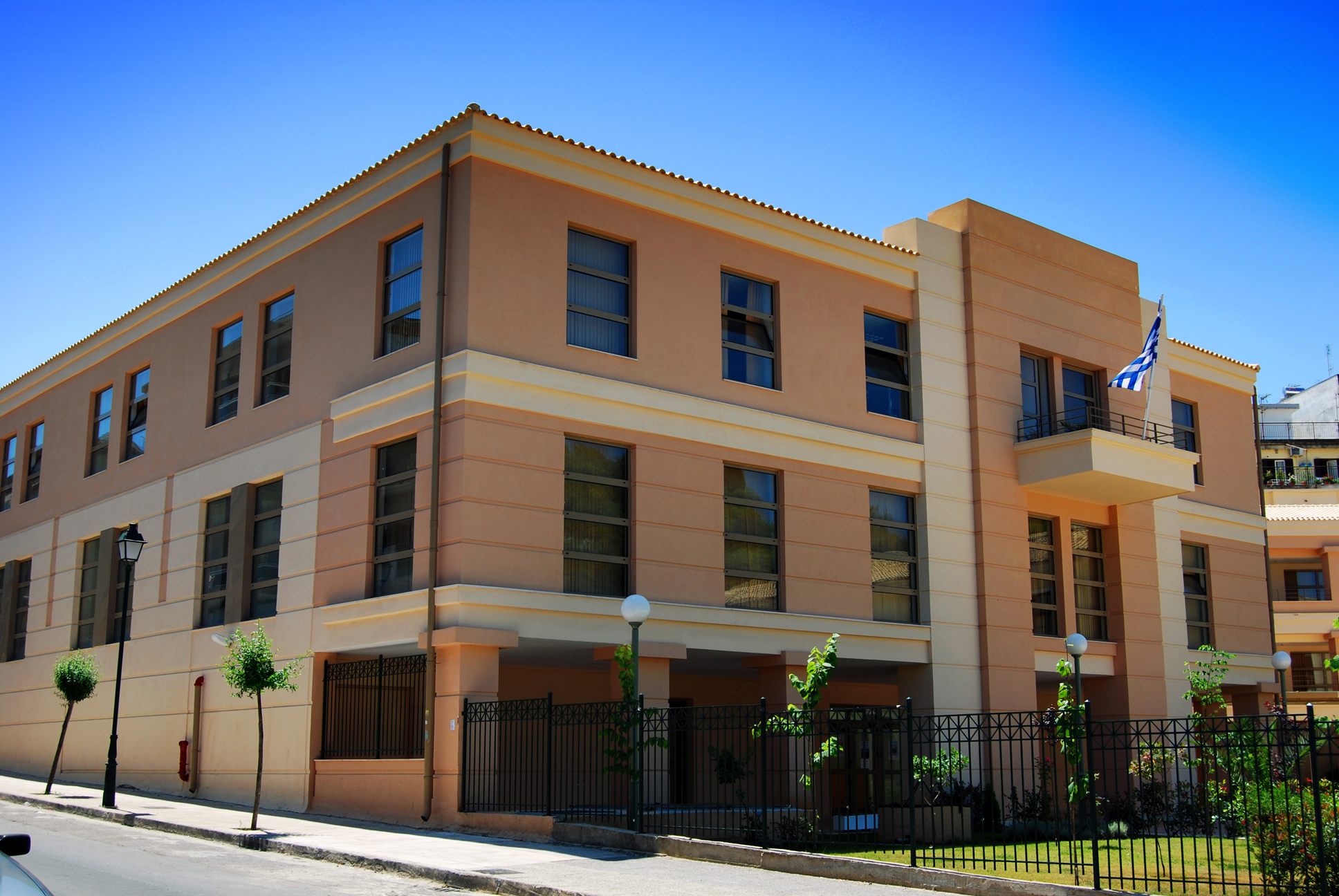
Department of History and Department of Archival Science in Corfu

Formal Laboratories

Department of History

- Laboratory of History Documentation and Mediterranean World Research
- Laboratory of Modern History Documentation
- Laboratory for the Study of the Ancient World

Department of Foreign Languages, Translation and Interpreting

- Laboratory for the Translation of Greek Literature (LTGL)
- Laboratory for Economic, Legal, Political and Technical Translation (LLePoTT)
- Laboratory of Geopolitical Analyses (GeoLab)
- Laboratory of Language and Politics
- Laboratory Of Language, History and Culture of the Ionian Islands Region

Department of Archives, Library Science and Museum Studies

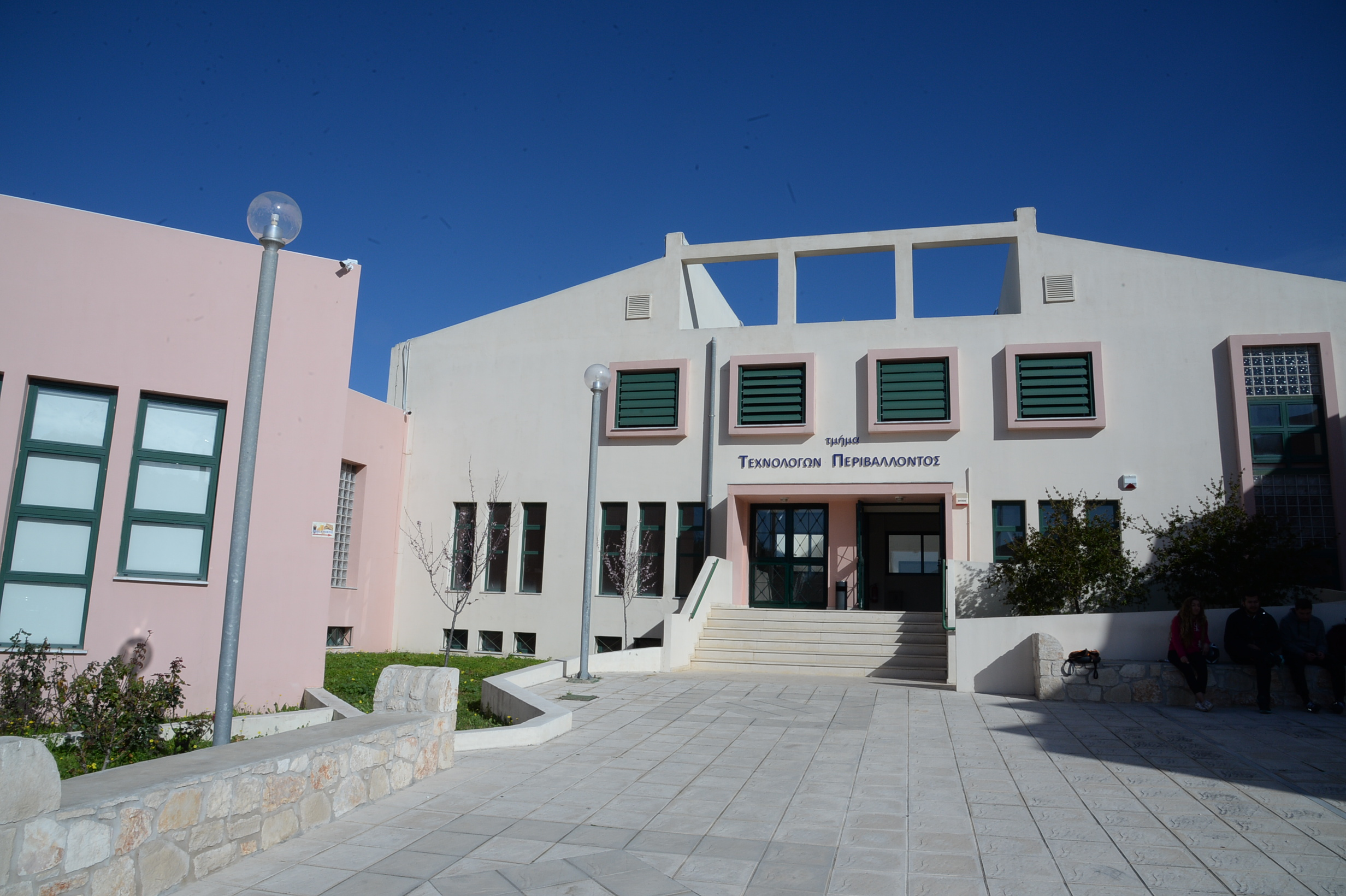
- Department of Environment in Zakynthos
  Laboratory on Digital Libraries and Electronic Publishing
- Laboratory for the Documentation of Cultural and Historic Heritage
- Laboratory of Information Technologies
- Museology Laboratory – Protection, Restoration and Utilisation of Cultural Goods

Department of Informatics

- Bioinformatics and Human Electrophysiology Lab (BiHELab)
- Information Systems and Databases Laboratory (ISDLab)
- Networks, Multimedia and Security Systems Laboratory (NMSLab)
- Humanistic and Social Informatics Lab (HILab)
- Computational Modeling Lab (CMODLab)

Department of Audio and Visual Arts

- Laboratory of Interactive Arts - InArts
- Audiovisual Signal Processing Laboratory - EP.O.A.SI
- Laboratory of Performing Environments in the Arts

Department of Music Studies

- Hellenic Music Research Lab
- Electroacoustic Music Research and Applications Laboratory
- Laboratory of Early Music

Department of Environment

- Laboratory of Physical Environment, Energy And Environmental Biology
- Laboratory of Software And Geoinformatics Technology
- Laboratory of Mathematics Physics-Computer Statistics
- Environmental and Sustainable Development Management Laboratory
- Laboratory of Chemistry And Environmental Protection

Student Activities

Since 2013, a simulation of UNESCO is held, every year, in Greece: SimUnesCO (simulation of UNESCO Corfu). It is organized by The Laboratory for Economic, Legal, Political and Technical Translation of the Department of Foreign Languages, Translation and Interpreting of the Ionian University.

The Ionian University has a fully equipped Sports Centre where the students and the university sports teams are trained under the supervision of professional trainers. Students can take part in sports programs of football, basketball, rowing, swimming and water polo and various fitness programs.

Student cultural groups

There is a variety of student cultural groups that deal with Drama, Fine Arts, Music, Cinema etc. Every student can participate in any cultural group he/she likes and express his talent through art.

== Academic evaluation ==
In 2016 the external evaluation committee gave Ionian University a Positive evaluation.

An external evaluation of all academic departments in Greek universities was conducted by the Hellenic Quality Assurance and Accreditation Agency (HQAA) in the following years.

- Department of Archives and Library Science (2011)
- Department of Foreign Languages, Translation and Interpreting (2013)
- Department of History (2014)
- Department of Music Studies (2012)
- Department of Audio and Visual Arts (2014)
- Department of Informatics (2011)

== See also ==
- List of research institutes in Greece
- List of universities in Greece
- Education in Greece
