= Installation art =

Three-dimensional work of art

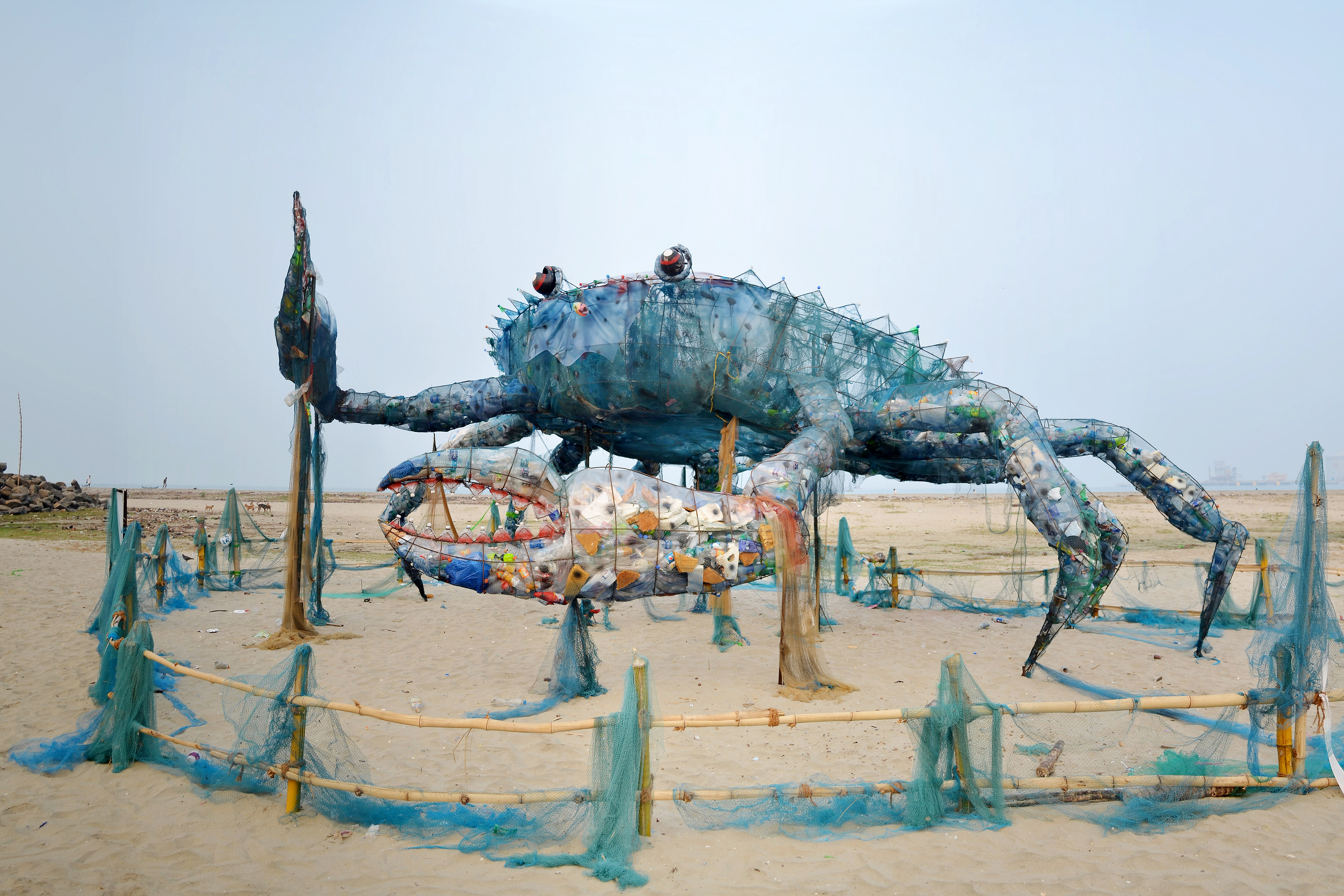
An installation art of a crab created with waste plastics and similar non-biodegradable wastes at Fort Kochi, India.

Installation art, also called "installations" and sometimes "environments", is an artistic genre of three-dimensional works that are often site-specific and designed to transform the perception of a space. Generally, the term is applied to interior spaces, whereas exterior interventions are often called public art, land art or art intervention; however, the boundaries between these terms overlap.

== History ==
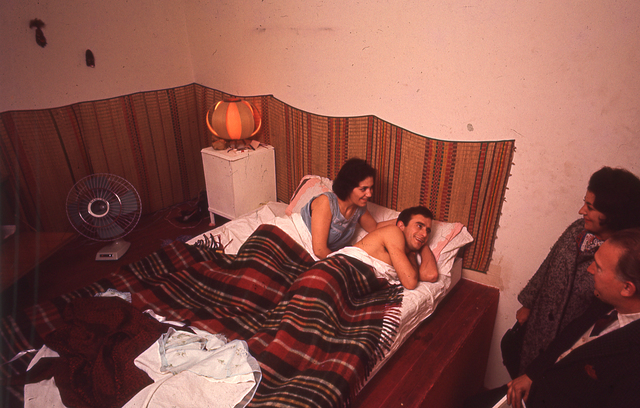
Visitors interact with a couple in bed, inside one of the many environments of La Menesunda (1965), one of the earliest large-scale installations in art history.

Installation art can be either temporary or permanent. Installation artworks have been constructed in exhibition spaces such as museums and galleries, as well as public and private spaces. The genre incorporates a broad range of everyday and natural materials, which are often chosen for their "evocative" qualities, as well as new media such as video, sound, performance, immersive virtual reality and the internet. Many installations are site-specific in that they are designed to exist only in the space for which they were created, appealing to qualities evident in a three-dimensional immersive medium. Artistic collectives such as the Exhibition Lab at New York's American Museum of Natural History created environments to showcase the natural world in as realistic a medium as possible. Likewise, Walt Disney Imagineering employed a similar philosophy when designing the multiple immersive spaces for Disneyland in 1955. Since its acceptance as a separate discipline, a number of institutions focusing on Installation art were created. These included the Mattress Factory, Pittsburgh; the Museum of Installation in London; and the Fairy Doors of Ann Arbor, in Michigan, among others.

Installation art came to prominence in the 1970s but its roots can be identified in earlier artists such as Marcel Duchamp and his use of the ready-made and Kurt Schwitters' Merz art objects, rather than more traditional craft-based sculpture. The "intention" of the artist is paramount in much later installation art whose roots lie in the conceptual art of the 1960s. This again is a departure from traditional sculpture which places its focus on form. Early non-Western installation art includes events staged by the Gutai Art Association in Japan starting in 1954, which influenced American installation pioneers like Allan Kaprow. Wolf Vostell shows his installation 6 TV Dé-coll/age in 1963 at the Smolin Gallery in New York.

== Installation ==
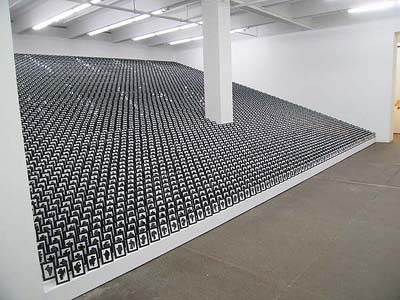
Allan McCollum.The Shapes Project, 2005/06

Installation as nomenclature for a specific form of art came into use fairly recently; its first use as documented by the Oxford English Dictionary was in 1969. It was coined in this context, in reference to a form of art that had arguably existed since prehistory but was not regarded as a discrete category until the mid-twentieth century. Allan Kaprow used the term "Environment" in 1958 (Kaprow 6) to describe his transformed indoor spaces; this later joined such terms as "project art" and "temporary art."

Essentially, installation/environmental art takes into account a broader sensory experience, rather than floating framed points of focus on a "neutral" wall or displaying isolated objects (literally) on a pedestal. This may leave space and time as its only dimensional constants, implying dissolution of the line between "art" and "life"; Kaprow noted that "if we bypass 'art' and take nature itself as a model or point of departure, we may be able to devise a different kind of art... out of the sensory stuff of ordinary life".

== Gesamtkunstwerk ==
The conscious act of artistically addressing all the senses with regard to a total experience made a resounding debut in 1849 when Richard Wagner conceived of a Gesamtkunstwerk, or an operatic work for the stage that drew inspiration from ancient Greek theater in its inclusion of all the major art forms: painting, writing, music, etc. (Britannica). In devising operatic works to commandeer the audience's senses, Wagner left nothing unobserved: architecture, ambience, and even the audience itself were considered and manipulated to achieve a state of total artistic immersion. In the book "Themes in Contemporary Art", it is suggested that "installations in the 1980s and 1990s were increasingly characterized by networks of operations involving the interaction among complex architectural settings, environmental sites and extensive use of everyday objects in ordinary contexts. With the advent of video in 1965, a concurrent strand of installation evolved through the use of new and ever-changing technologies, and what had been simple video installations expanded to include complex interactive, multimedia and virtual reality environments".

== Art and Objecthood ==
Guardians of Time, Manfred Kielnhofer, Festival of Lights (Berlin) French Cathedral, Berlin, Velotaxi 2011

In "Art and Objecthood", Michael Fried derisively labels art that acknowledges the viewer as "theatrical" (Fried 45). There is a strong parallel between installation and theater: both play to a viewer who is expected to be at once immersed in the sensory/narrative experience that surrounds him and maintain a degree of self-identity as a viewer. The traditional theater-goer does not forget that they have come in from outside to sit and take in a created experience; a trademark of installation art has been the curious and eager viewer, still aware that they are in an exhibition setting and tentatively exploring the novel universe of the installation.

The artist and critic Ilya Kabakov mentions this essential phenomenon in the introduction to his lectures "On the "Total" Installation": "[One] is simultaneously both a 'victim' and a viewer, who on the one hand surveys and evaluates the installation, and on the other, follows those associations, recollections which arise in him[;] he is overcome by the intense atmosphere of the total illusion". Installation art focuses on how the viewer physically moves through and perceives the space, making their presence an integral part of the work. The expectations and social habits that the viewer brings with him into the space of the installation will remain with him as he enters, to be either applied or negated once he has taken in the new environment. What is common to nearly all installation art is a consideration of the experience in toto and the problems it may present, namely the constant conflict between disinterested criticism and sympathetic involvement. Television and video offer somewhat immersive experiences, but their unrelenting control over the rhythm of passing time and the arrangement of images precludes an intimately personal viewing experience. Ultimately, the only things a viewer can be assured of when experiencing the work are his own thoughts and preconceptions and the basic rules of space and time. All else may be molded by the artist's hands.

The central importance of the subjective point of view when experiencing installation art, points toward a disregard for traditional Platonic image theory. In effect, the entire installation adopts the character of the simulacrum or flawed statue: it neglects any ideal form in favor of optimizing its direct appearance to the observer. Installation art operates fully within the realm of sensory perception, in a sense "installing" the viewer into an artificial system with an appeal to his subjective perception as its ultimate goal.

== Interactive installations ==
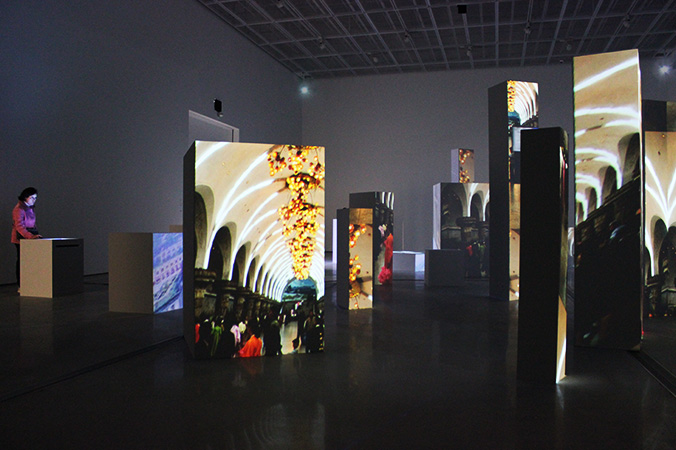
Marc Lee 10.000 Moving Cities, 2010-ongoing, National Museum of Modern and Contemporary Art Seoul

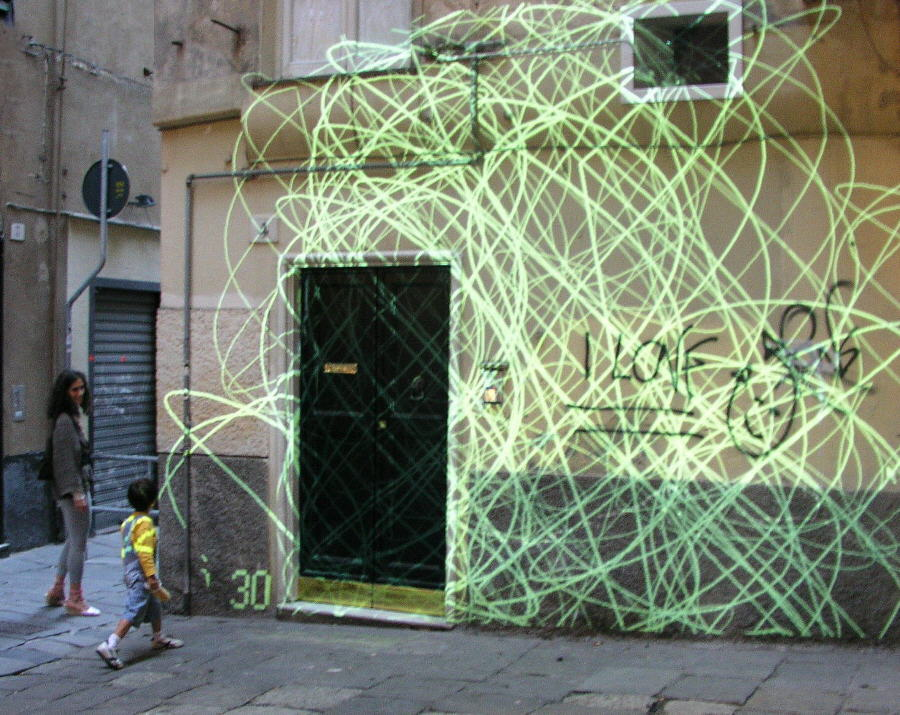
An urban interactive art installation by Maurizio Bolognini (Genoa, 2005), which everybody can modify by using a cell phone.

An interactive installation frequently involves the audience acting on the work of art or the piece responding to users' activity. There are several kinds of interactive installations that artists produce, these include web-based installations (e.g., Telegarden), gallery-based installations, digital-based installations, electronic-based installations, mobile-based installations, etc. Interactive installations appeared mostly at end of the 1980s (Legible City by Jeffrey Shaw, La plume by Edmond Couchot, Michel Bret...) and became a genre during the 1990s, when artists became particularly interested in using the participation of the audiences to activate and reveal the meaning of the installation.

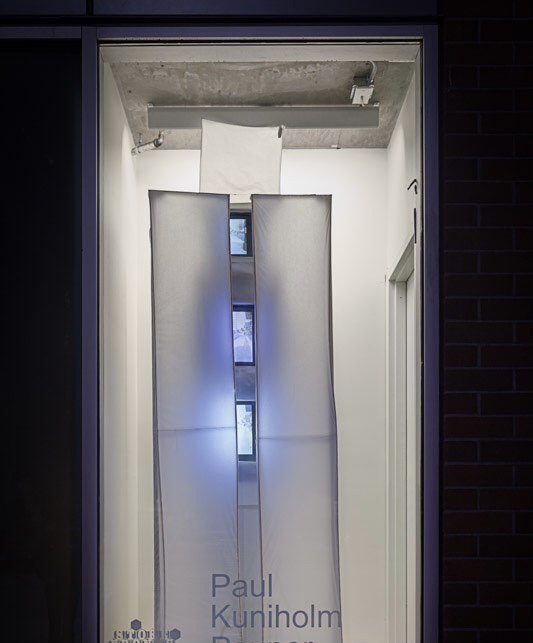
Paul Kuniholm Installation Art, for Storefronts, a Shunpike program

== Immersive virtual reality ==
With the improvement of technology over the years, artists are more able to explore outside the boundaries that were never able to be explored by artists in the past. The media used are more experimental and bold; they are also usually cross media and may involve sensors, which plays on the reaction to the audiences' movement when looking at the installations. By using virtual reality as a medium, immersive virtual reality art is probably the most deeply interactive form of art. By allowing the spectator to "visit" the representation, the artist creates "situations to live" vs "spectacle to watch".

== Gallery ==
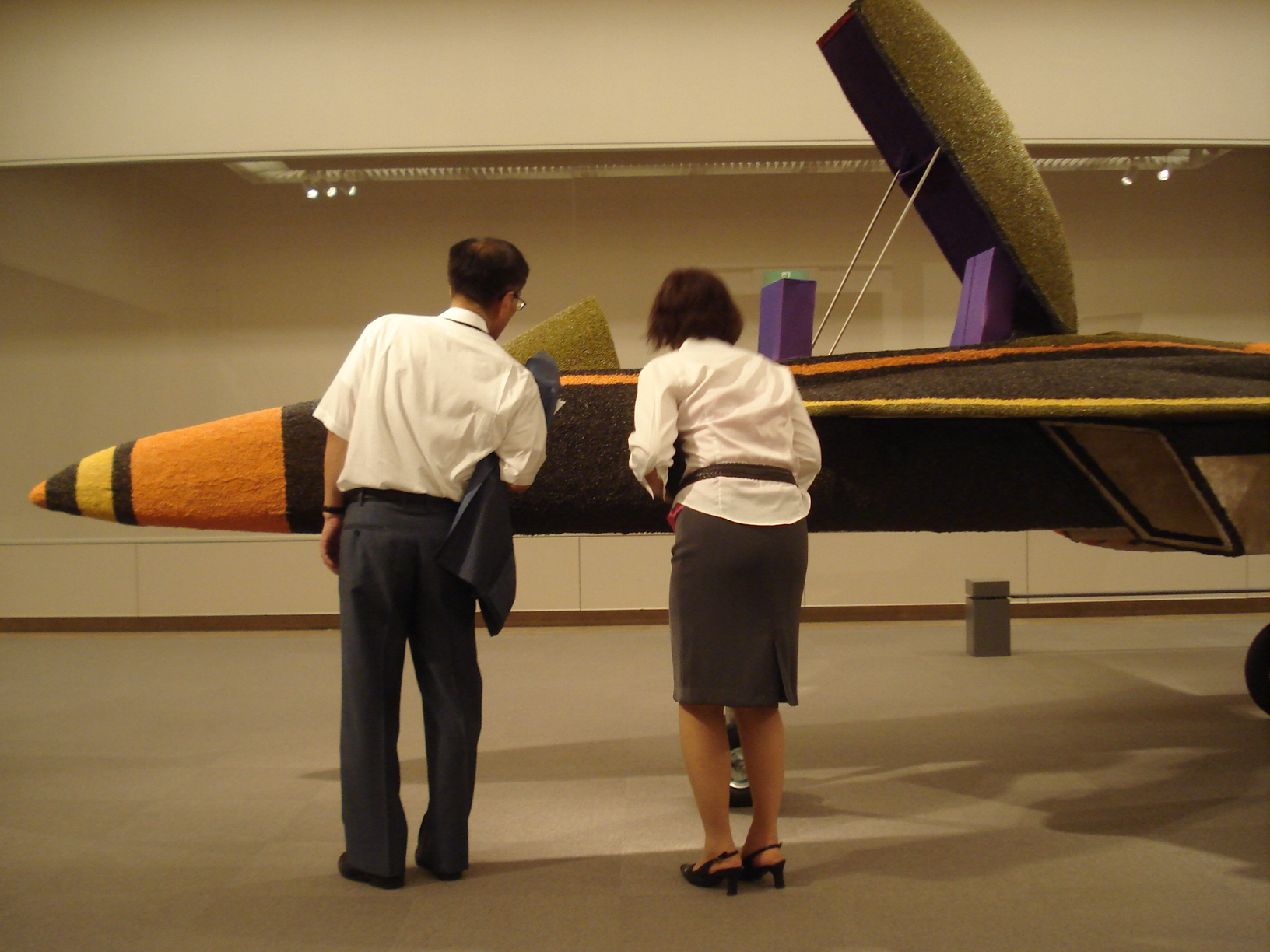
Firoz Mahmud, Sucker'wfp21 aircraft sculptural installation at Aichi Arts Center.

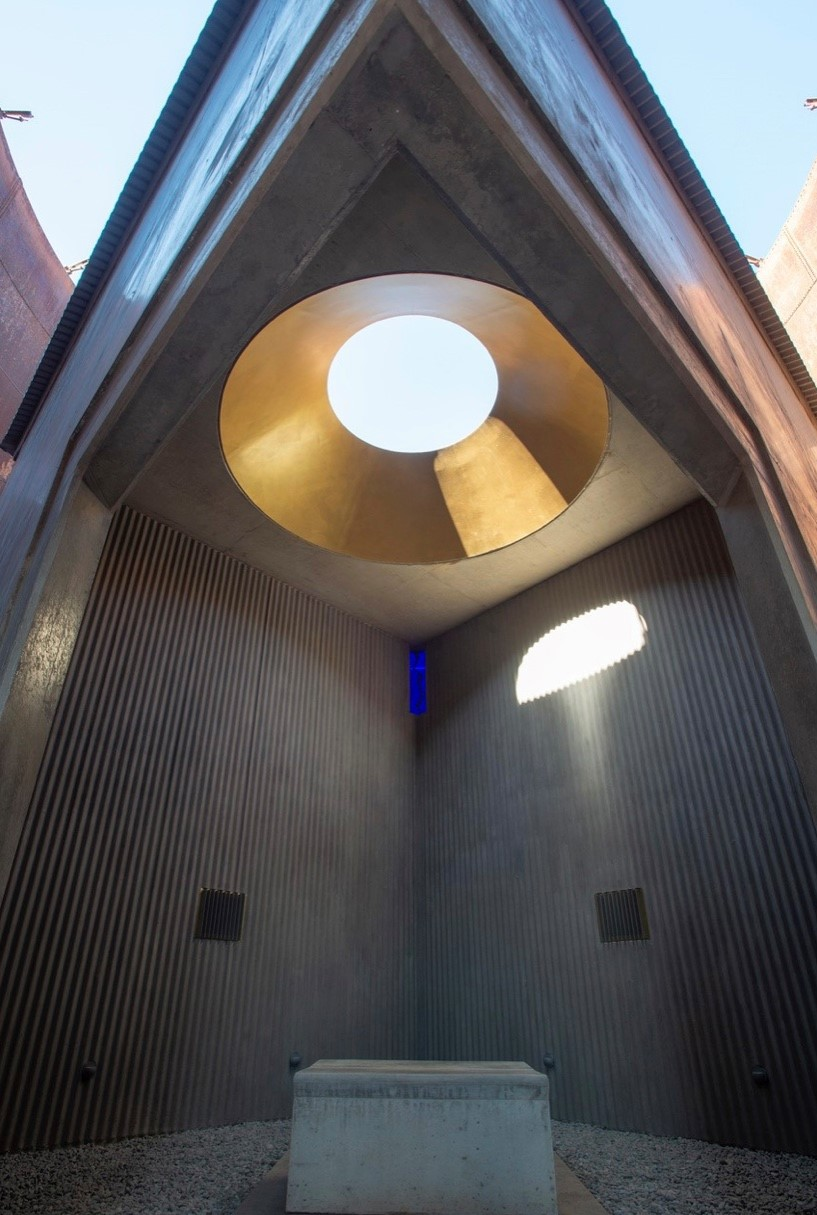
Georges Lentz, Cobar Sound Chapel, permanent sound installation, 2022.

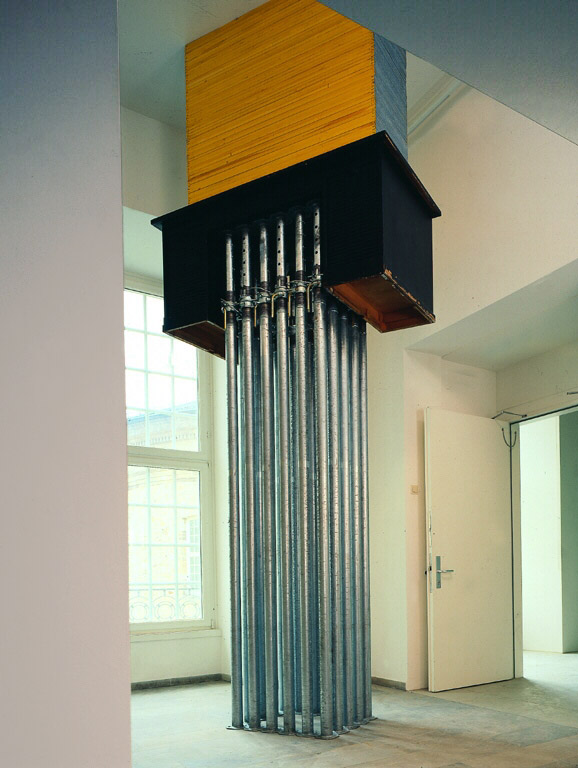
Eberhard Bosslet, Anmaßend I, documenta 8, Kassel, Germany 1987.

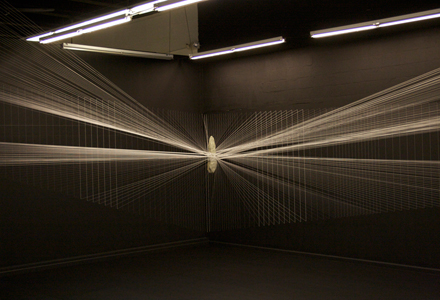
Milton Becerra, Ale'ya, Durban Segnini Gallery, Miami, 2009.

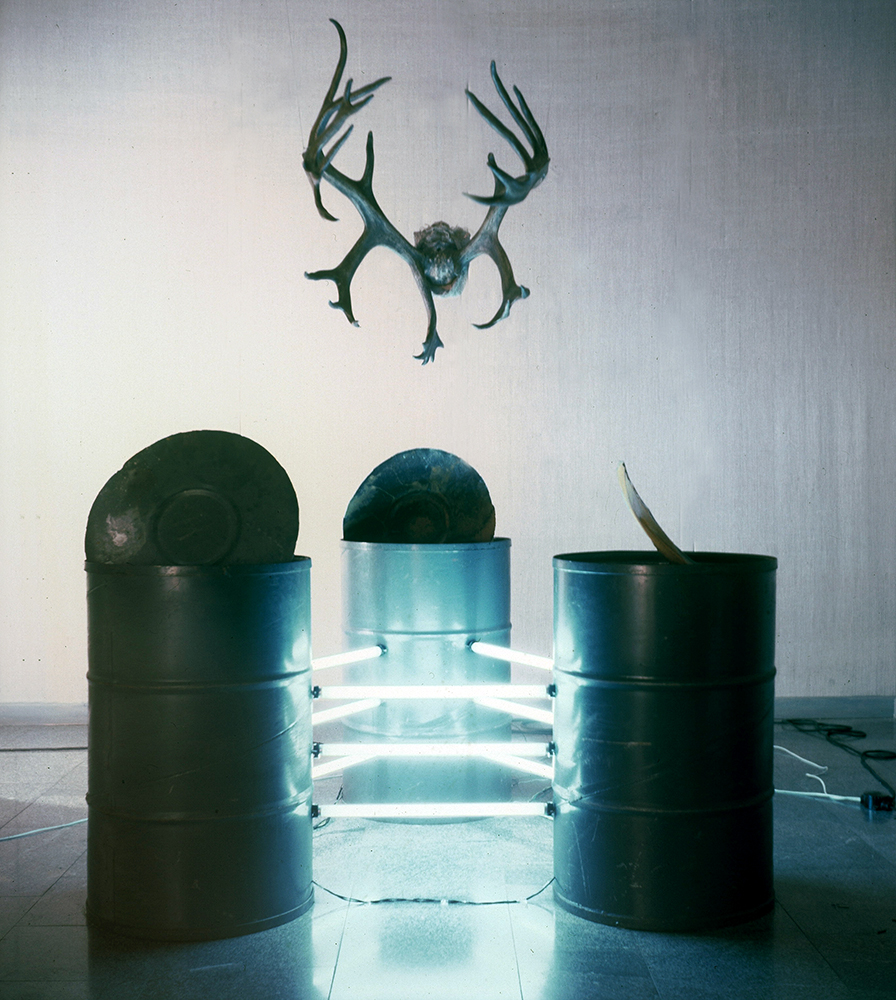
Vasiliy Ryabchenko, Big Bembi, 1994.

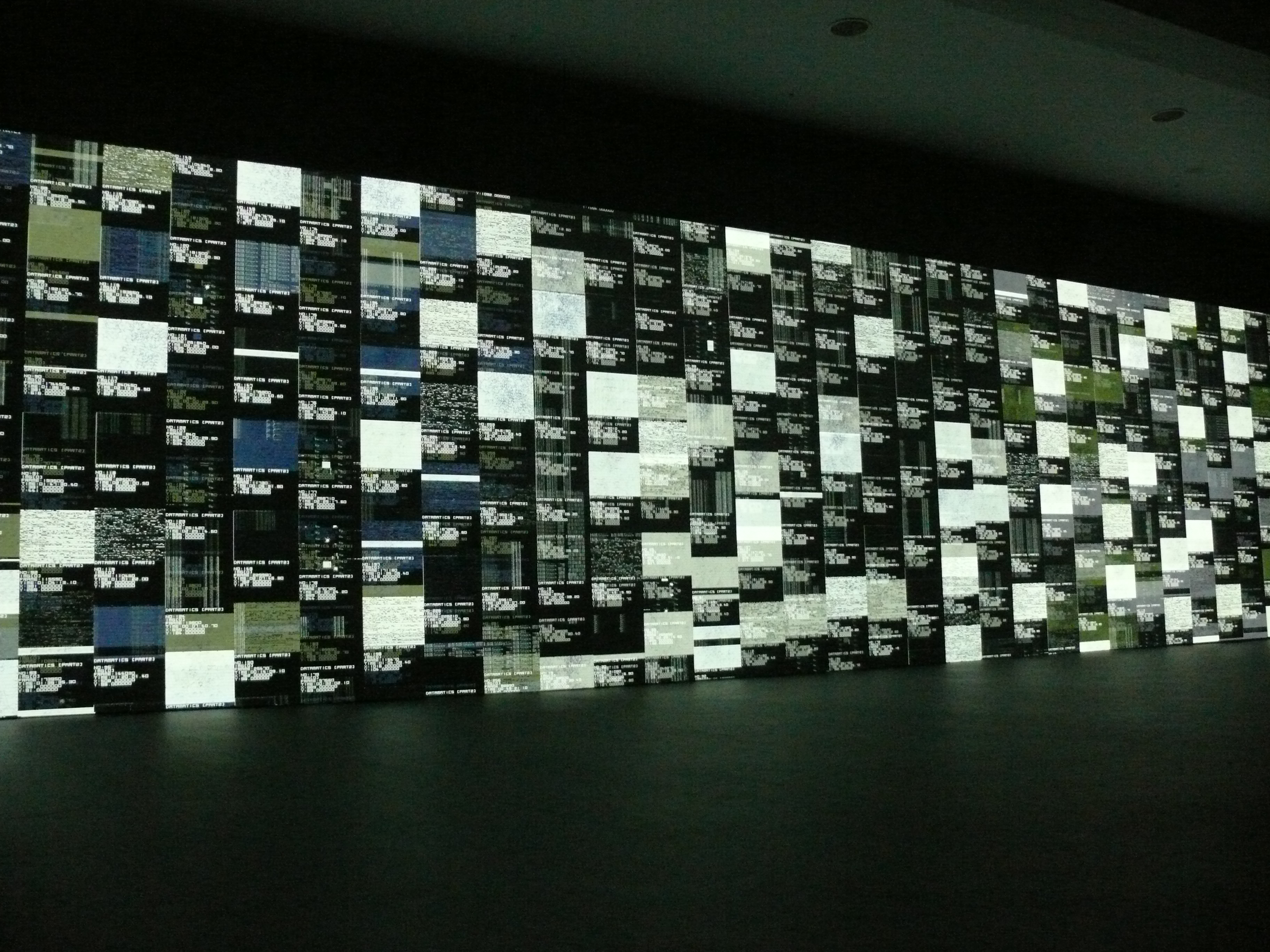
Ryoji Ikeda, data.tron at transmediale, Berlin, 2010.

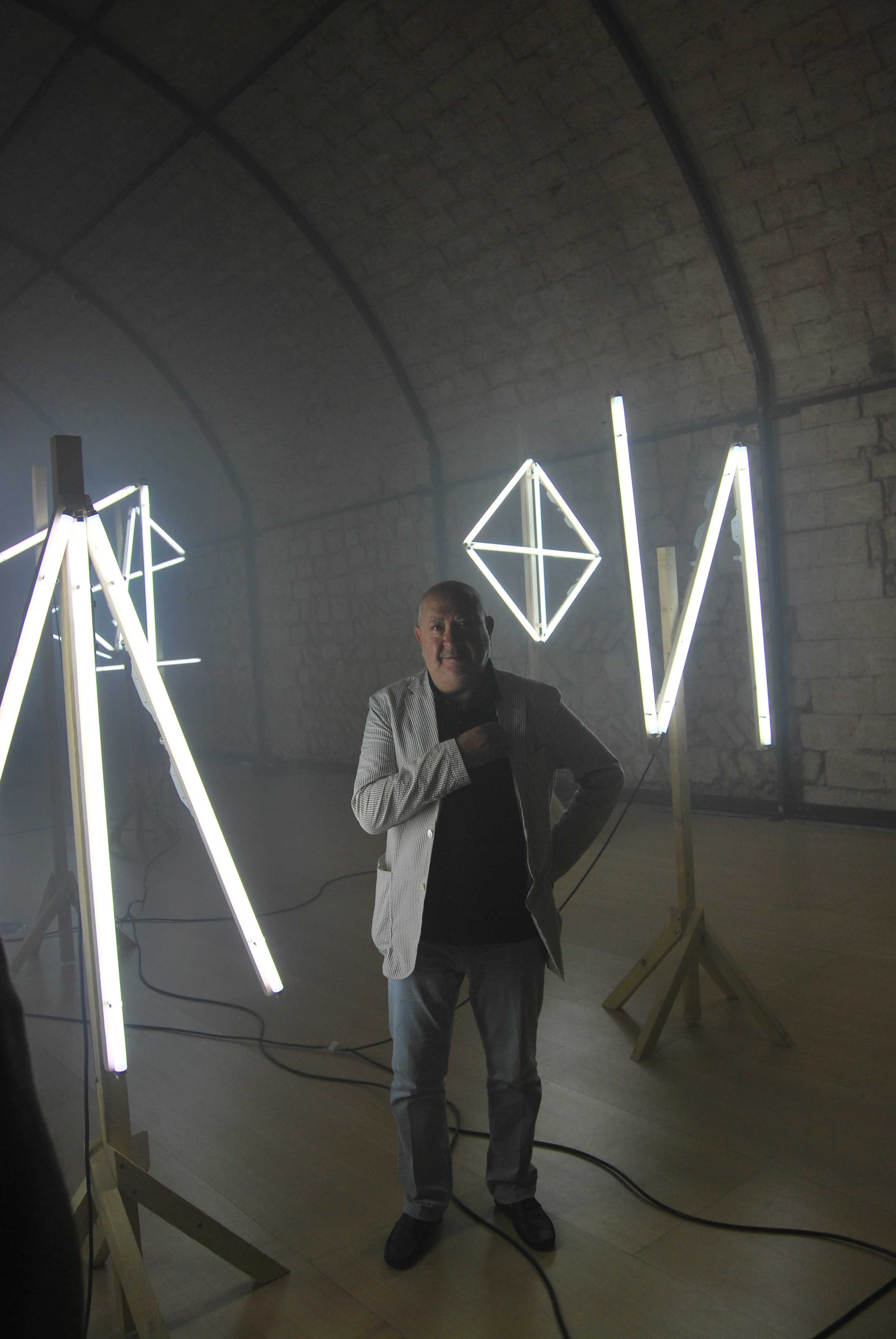
Christian Boltanski, Signatures, 2011.

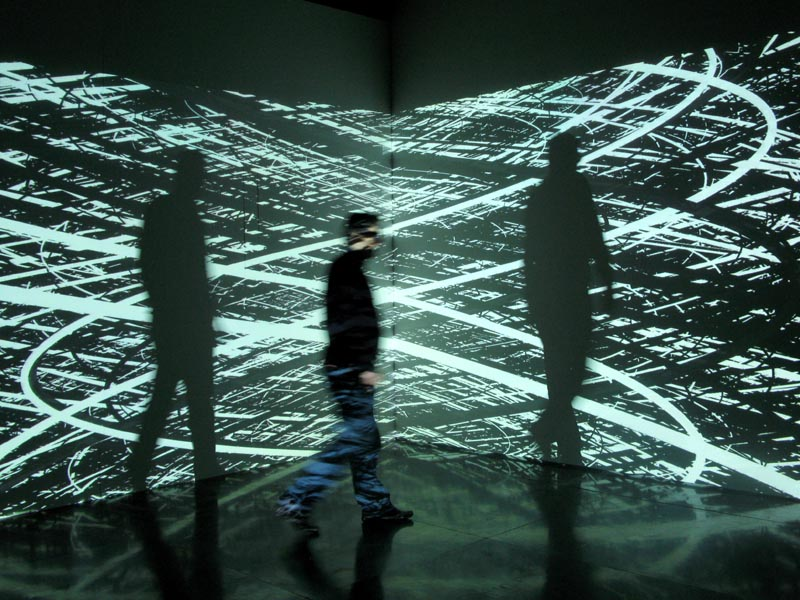
Pascal Dombis, Irrationnal Geometrics, 2008.

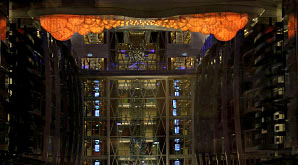
Grimanesa Amorós, Racimo, Allure of the Seas, 2011.

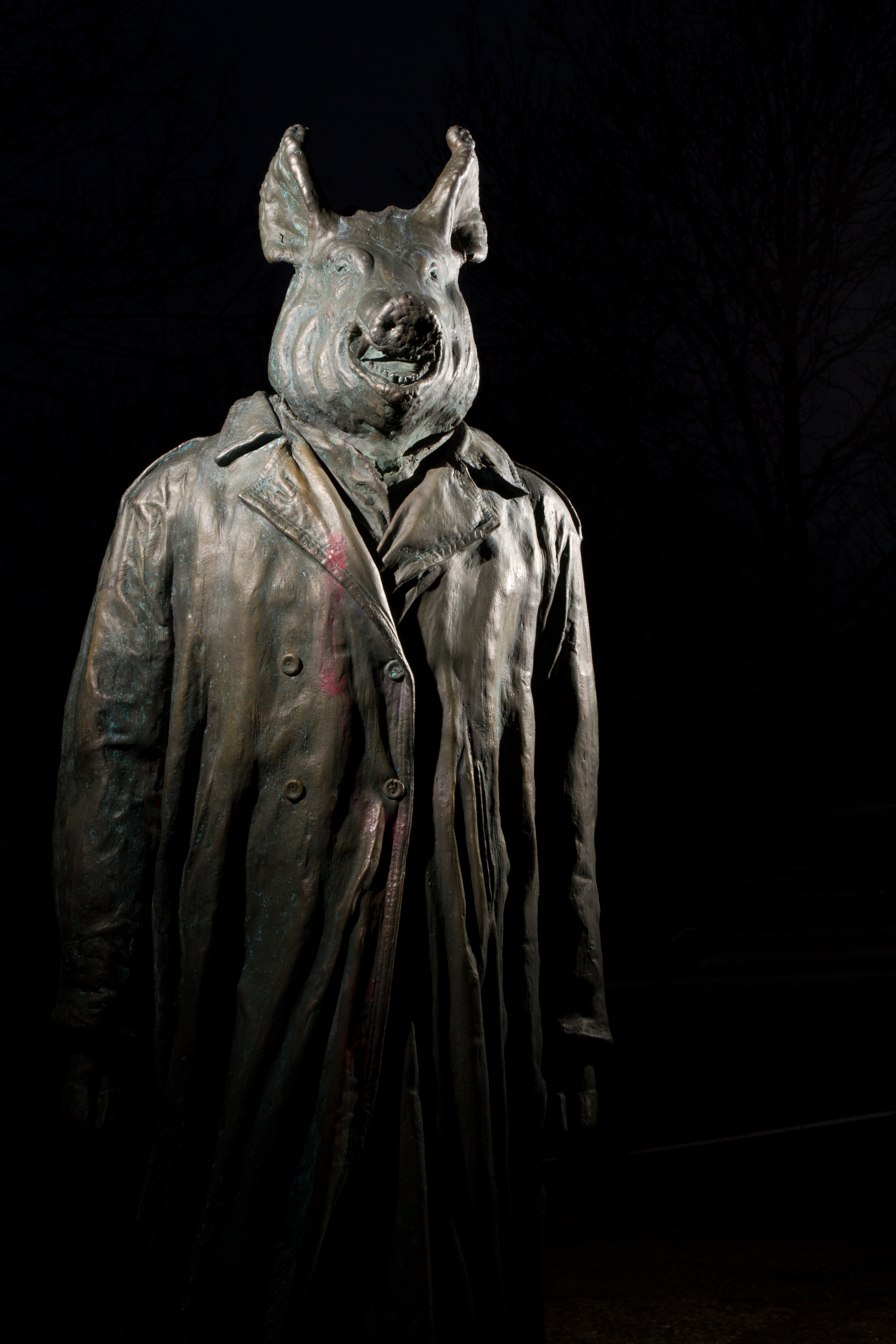
Jens Galschiøt, My Inner Beast, sculpture, 1993. Exhibited in twenty cities across Europe without permission of the authorities.

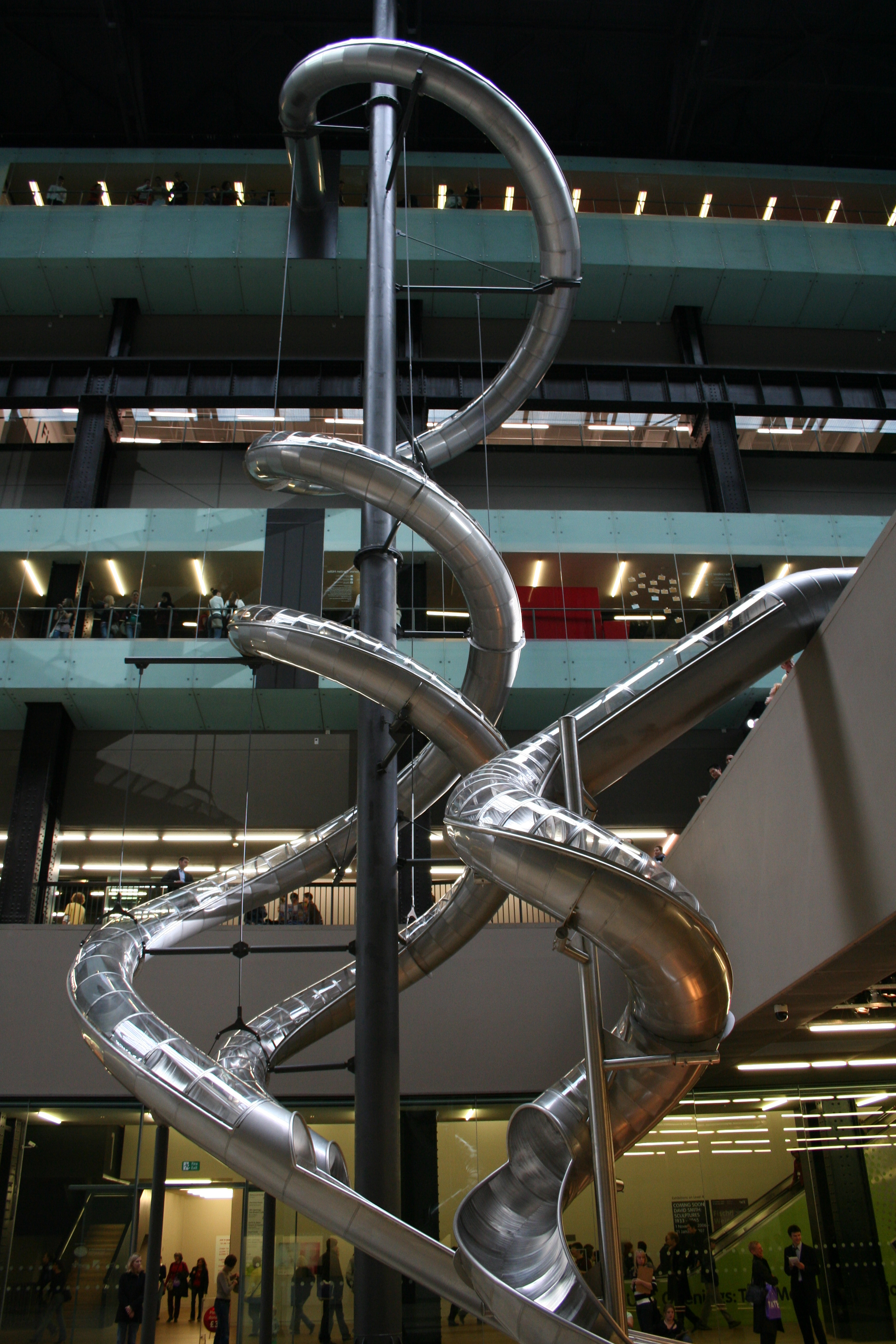
Carsten Höller. Test Site, Tate Modern, 2006. Members of public slid down as much as five stories inside tubular slides.

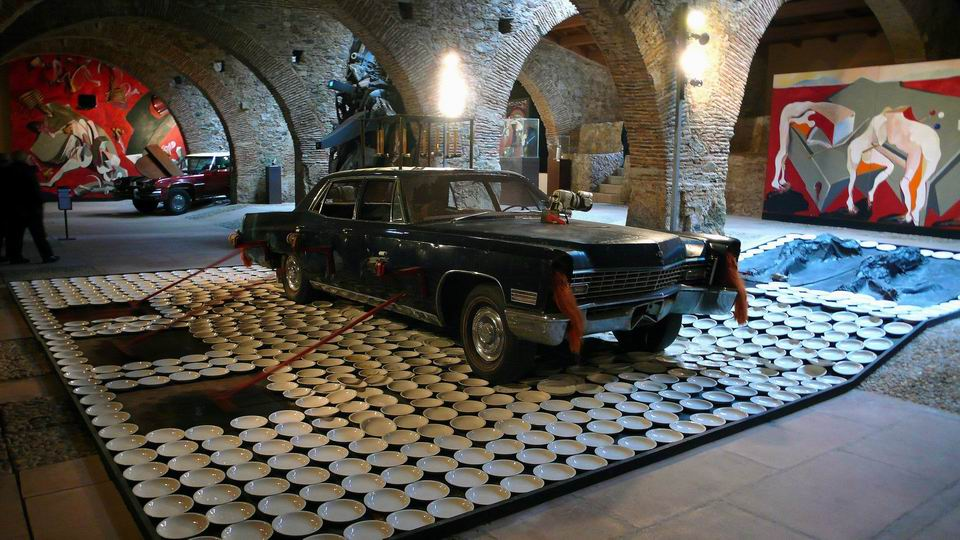
Wolf Vostell, Auto-Fever, 1973, Museo Vostell Malpartida.

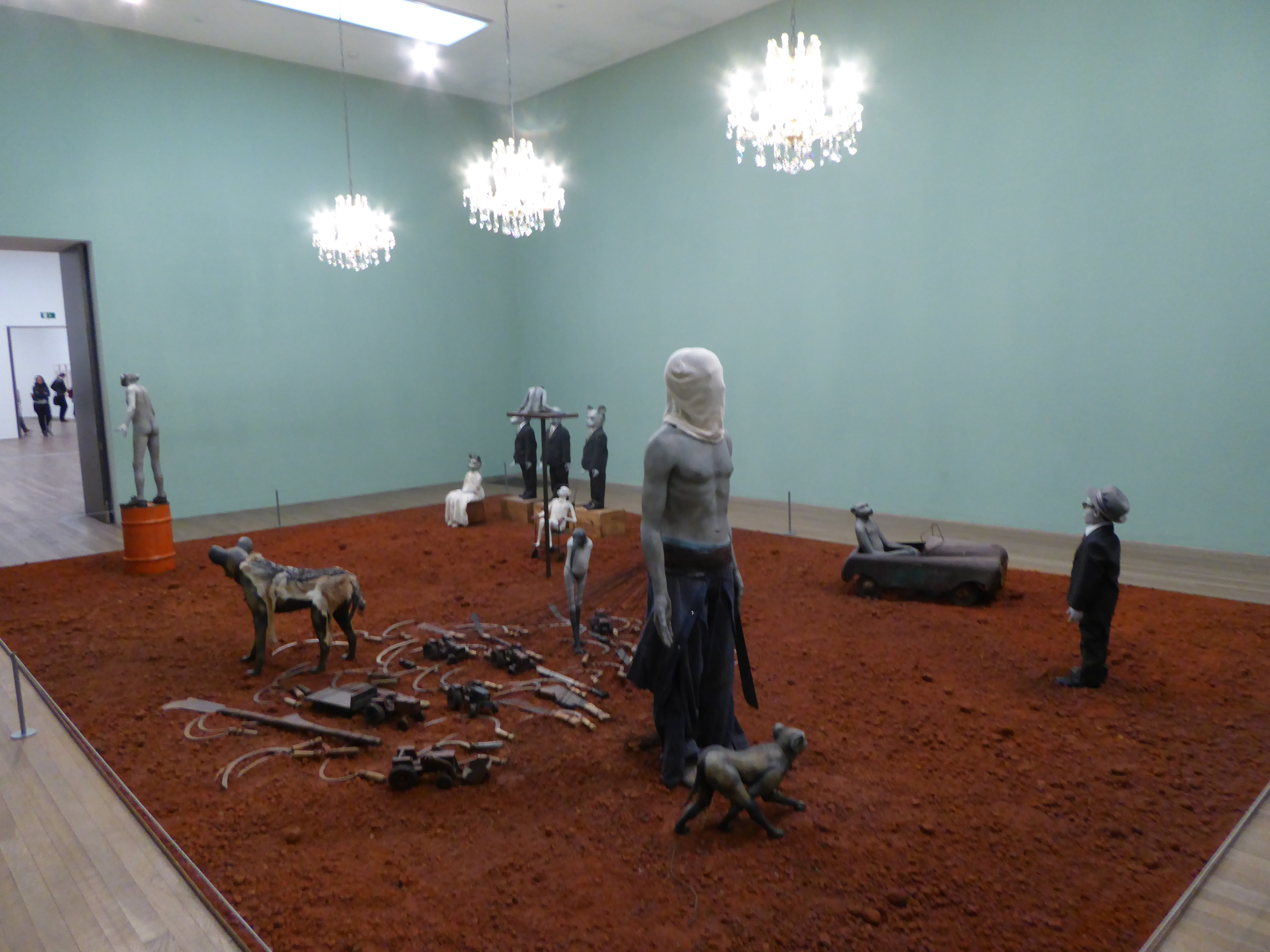
Jane Alexander, African Adventure , 1999–2002, Tate Modern, Bankside, London, England, November 2016.

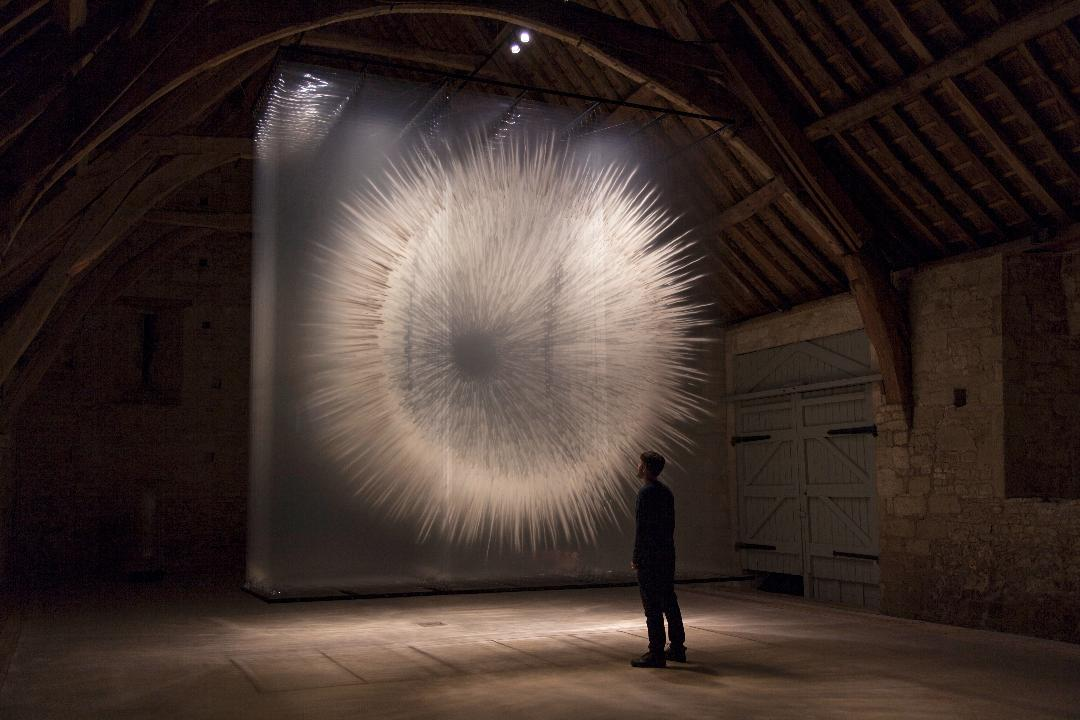
David Spriggs, Vision II, 2017.

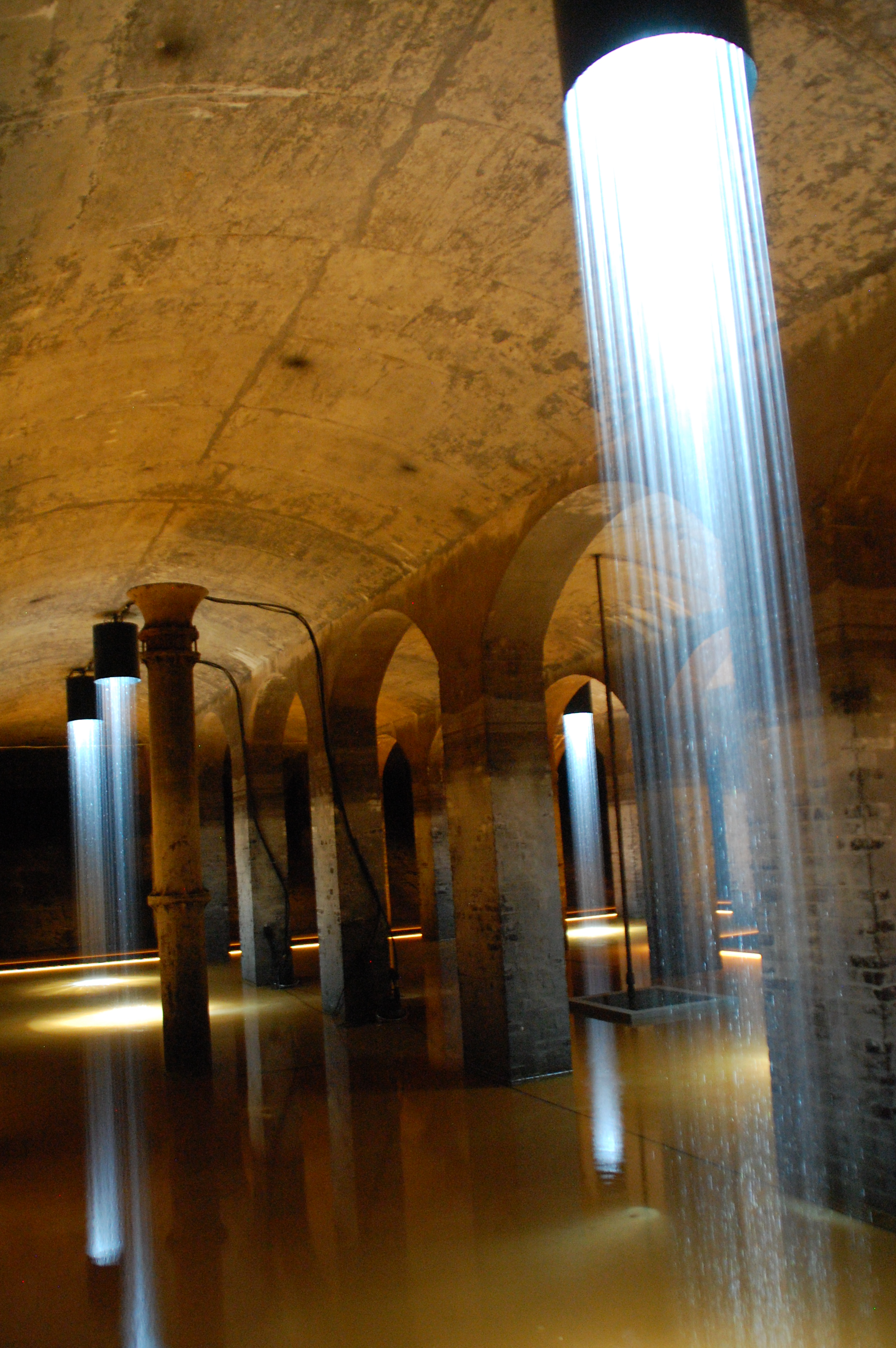
Ingvar Cronhammar, installation in Frederiksberg / Denmark 2015.

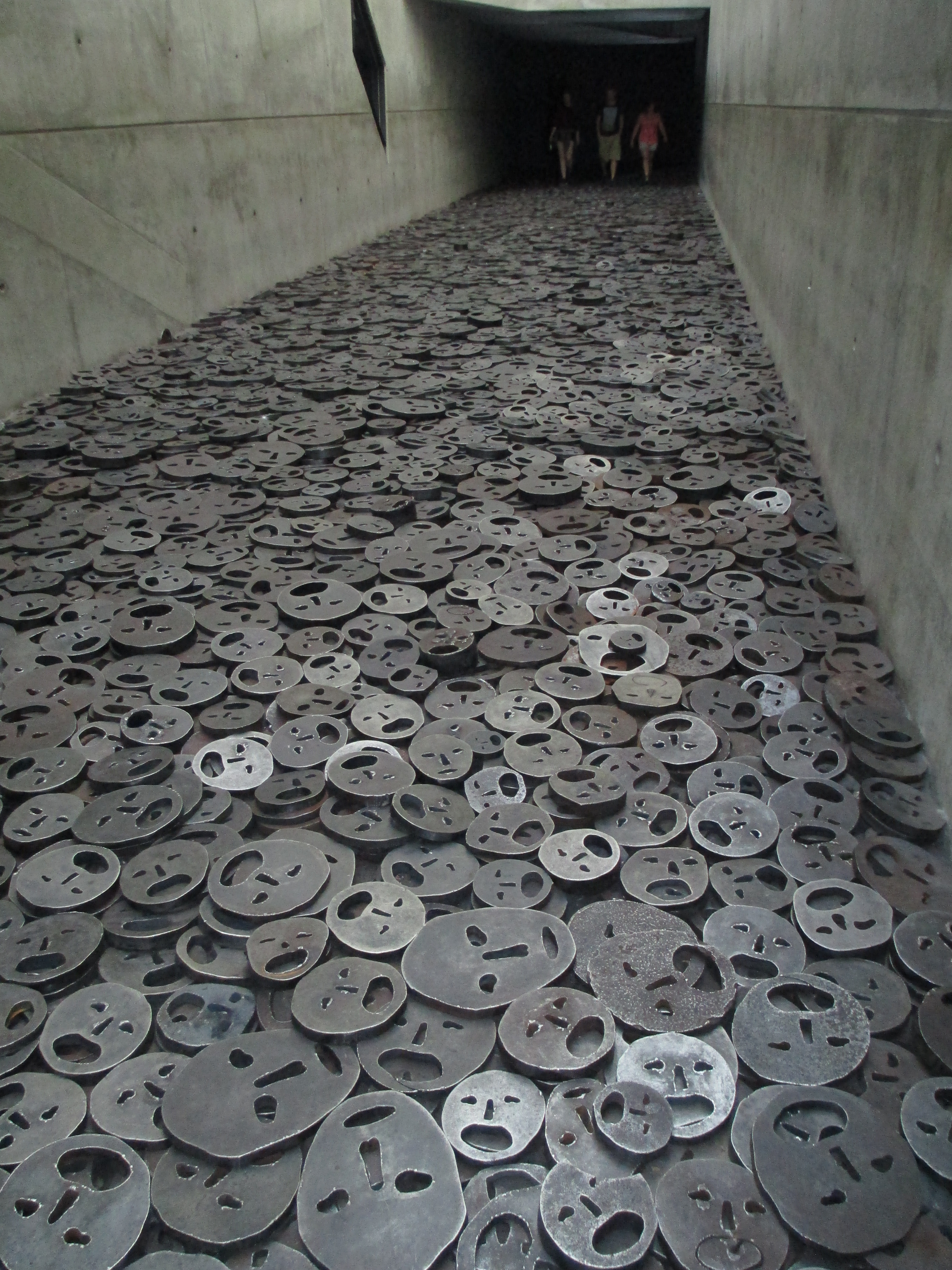
Menashe Kadishman, Shalechet (Abscission), Jewish Museum Berlin.

== See also ==
- Appropriation (art)
- Art intervention
- Barbie Beach
- Classificatory disputes about art
- Conceptual art
- Environmental sculpture
- Found object
- Interactive art
- Modern art
- Neo-conceptual art
- Performance art
- Sound art
- Sound installation
- Street installations
- Video installation

== Bibliography ==
- Bishop, Claire. Installation Art a Critical History. London: Tate, 2005.
- Coulter-Smith, Graham. Deconstructing Installation Art. Online resource
- Ferriani, Barbara. Ephemeral Monuments: History and Conservation of Installation Art. Los Angeles: Getty Publications, 2013. ISBN 978-1-60606-134-3
- Fried, Michael. Art and Objecthood. In Art and Objecthood: Essays and Reviews. Chicago: University of Chicago Press, 1998.
- Grau, Oliver Virtual Art, from Illusion to Immersion, MIT Press 2004, ISBN 0-262-57223-0
- "Installation [Environment].Grove Art Encyclopedia. 2006. Grove Art Online. 30 January 2006 .
- "Installation." Oxford English Dictionary. 2006. Oxford English Dictionary Online. 30 January 2006 .
- "Install, v." Oxford English Dictionary. 2006. Oxford English Dictionary Online. 30 January 2006 .
- Murray, Timothy, Derrick de Kerckhove, Oliver Grau, Kristine Stiles, Jean-Baptiste Barrière, Dominique Moulon, Jean-Pierre Balpe, Maurice Benayoun Open Art, Nouvelles éditions Scala, 2011, French version, ISBN 978-2-35988-046-5
- Kabakov, Ilya. On the "Total" Installation. Ostfildern, Germany: Cantz, 1995, 243–260.
- Kaprow, Allan. "Notes on the Creation of a Total Art." In Essays on the Blurring of Art and Life, ed. Jeff Kelley. Berkeley: University of California Press, 2003. ISBN 0-520-24079-0
- Mondloch, Kate. Screens: Viewing Media Installation Art. Minneapolis: University of Minnesota Press, 2010. ISBN 978-0-8166-6522-8
- Nechvatal, Joseph, Immersive Ideals / Critical Distances. LAP Lambert Academic Publishing. 2009.
- "Opera". Britannica Student Encyclopedia (Encyclopædia Britannica Online ed.). 15 February 2006.
- Reiss, Julie H. From Margin to Center: The Spaces of Installation Art. Cambridge, MA: MIT Press, 2001. ISBN 0-262-68134-X
- Rosenthal, Mark. Understanding Installation Art: From Duchamp to Holzer. Munich: Prestel Verlag, 2003. ISBN 3-7913-2984-7
- Suderburg, Erika. Space, Site, Intervention: Situating Installation Art. Minneapolis London: University of Minnesota Press, 2000. ISBN 0-8166-3159-X
