= Turin, Georgia =

- Town
- Location in Coweta County and the state of Georgia
- Coordinates: 33°19′36″N 84°38′3″W
- Country: United States
- State: Georgia
- County: Coweta

Area
  - Total: 1.60 sq mi (4.15 km^{2})
  - Land: 1.59 sq mi (4.13 km^{2})
  - Water: 0.0077 sq mi (0.02 km^{2})
- Elevation: 906 ft (276 m)

Population (2020)
  - Total: 347
  - Density: 220/sq mi (84/km^{2})
- Time zone: UTC-5 (Eastern (EST))
  - Summer (DST): UTC-4 (EDT)
- ZIP code: 30289
- Area code: 770
- FIPS code: 13-77764
- GNIS feature ID: 0324361
- Website: townofturin.com

Turin is a town in Coweta County, Georgia, United States. The population was 347 in 2020, up from 274 at the 2010 census. It is part of the Atlanta metropolitan area.

== History ==
The Georgia General Assembly incorporated Turin as a town in 1890. The town's name is a transfer from Turin, in Italy.

== Geography ==
The town of Sharpsburg is immediately to the northwest. Georgia State Route 16 passes through the town, leading northwest 11 miles (18 km) to Newnan, the county seat, and southeast 5 miles (8 km) to Senoia.

According to the United States Census Bureau, the town has a total area of 1.6 square miles (4.2 km^{2}), of which 0.008 square miles (0.02 km^{2}), or 0.53%, is water.

== Demographics ==
Historical population
| Census | Pop. | Note | %± |
|---|---|---|---|
| 1890 | 161 | | — |
| 1900 | 196 | | 21.7% |
| 1910 | 263 | | 34.2% |
| 1920 | 239 | | −9.1% |
| 1930 | 208 | | −13.0% |
| 1940 | 146 | | −29.8% |
| 1950 | 185 | | 26.7% |
| 1960 | 183 | | −1.1% |
| 1970 | 242 | | 32.2% |
| 1980 | 260 | | 7.4% |
| 1990 | 189 | | −27.3% |
| 2000 | 165 | | −12.7% |
| 2010 | 274 | | 66.1% |
| 2020 | 347 | | 26.6% |
| 2025 (est.) | 590 | | 70.0% |
U.S. Decennial Census

In 2000, there were 165 people, 66 households, and 51 families residing in the town. At the 2020 census, there were 347 people in the town.

== Arts and culture ==
Barbie Beach was an art installation in Turin featuring a sandbox filled with Barbie dolls.
