= Barbie Beach =

Art installation in Turin, Georgia, US

Barbie Beach was a roadside art installation created and maintained by Lynda Quick and her husband Steve Quick on their front yard in Turin, Georgia, United States, on the side of State Route 16. It consisted of a six by four–foot sandbox, embedded with various mostly nude Barbie dolls reenacting current events, holidays, and various recreational scenes. Sources vary widely on the date and story of Barbie Beach's origin, but it has existed since at least December 2005; many sources echo the underlying idea that after Lynda Quick's front-yard rosebush was destroyed, Lynda bought naked Barbie dolls and sand from a local store and created the first Barbie Beach scene. The installation ran until Lynda's death in 2024, at age 76. Barbie Beach was popular in the local community, although it upset some neighbors; after Lynda's death, fans laid flowers on the beach in her honor. Barbie Beach appeared in a local art gallery and two promotions for The Walking Dead, and it was the subject of a documentary at the Cannes Film Festival.

== History ==
Barbie Beach was created and maintained by Lynda Dell Quick, an employee of the Coweta County Water and Sewer Department, along with her husband Steven Mel Quick, a substitute teacher. Sources vary, however, as to when and how it was created. Its first scene has variously been attested to be a depiction of the 2006 Winter Olympics in Turin, Italy; the U.S. women's beach volleyball team in the 2004 Summer Olympics; or the 1996 Summer Olympics in Atlanta, Georgia. Sources as early as December 2005 document its existence. Sources generally agree that it was started after a rose bush, planted by Lynda Quick, was destroyed, but differ as to whether it was destroyed by the Georgia Department of Transportation or Georgia Power. The rose bush was either cut down or sprayed with weedkiller. In one story, the destruction was intentional and the Quicks were told not to replant the rose bush, but in others, it was simply indiscriminate destruction as part of a construction project. From there, Lynda went to Goodwill to buy either six or ten naked Barbie dolls and sand to create the first scene, a beach volleyball game with a ping-pong net and ball.

Barbie Beach, a six-by-four sandbox, was frequently updated to have the mostly-naked dolls reenact new scenes; Lynda remarked that many ideas were helped along by drinking beer. Scenes were often references to current events, like the Rockettes appearing in Atlanta, the wedding of Prince William and Catherine Middleton, and Hurricane Katrina (the beach was evacuated). Holidays were frequently celebrated at Barbie Beach, including Halloween, Chinese New Year, Memorial Day, and Pride. Other times, the scenes were purely for fun, like the dolls taking a road trip to Arkansas. One regular character in the scenes was named Mort; he was a muscular figure who operated Mort's Bar, and he was sometimes a love interest for the Barbie dolls.

Barbie Beach concluded with the death of Lynda Quick in August 2024, at age 76; she had carried on the project for more than a year following Steve's death in May 2023. Its last scene was a depiction of construction on a local roundabout. Their family has declined to restart the project.

== Reaction ==
Barbie Beach has been received mostly positively by its community, although some neighbors dislike the increased traffic in the area. Community members donated Barbie dolls and offered to help rebuild after the beach was destroyed by vandals in 2006. After Lynda's death, fans laid flowers on Barbie Beach. On social media, Barbie Beach has a Facebook group; it had over 2,300 followers as of 2011, and c. 5,000 followers as of 2023. Pictures of the beach were posted there, as well as text updates.

Barbie Beach has also appeared in the art world, including a promotions for a television show, a documentary, and a gallery exhibit. The promotions were run in 2011 and 2013 for The Walking Dead; the show's producers gave Lynda sets of zombie dolls made by the art team, depicted chasing after the beach's regular Barbie dolls. The Cochran Gallery ran an exhibit on Barbie Beach at the Cochran Gallery in LaGrange, Georgia, from August to September 2013. In the center of the gallery, there was a sandbox containing various Barbie Beach scenes. Mort's Bar was portrayed, albeit without Mort; Lynda explained that he had gone to rehab. The ping-pong net and ball used for the very first scene was also present. The Barbies at the actual Barbie Beach, during the exhibit, were depicted on various vehicles, including cars, horses, and hot air balloons, headed towards the gallery. Barbie Beach was also the subject of a documentary called Barbie Beach, focused on the beach and the Quicks. It features interviews with the Quicks, as well as of the Barbie dolls themselves (posed watching television). The documentary was created by Courtney Dixon with a runtime of nine minutes; she successfully submitted it to the Cannes Film Festival in 2016 for its "short film corner".
