= IPhone art =

Form of interactive art

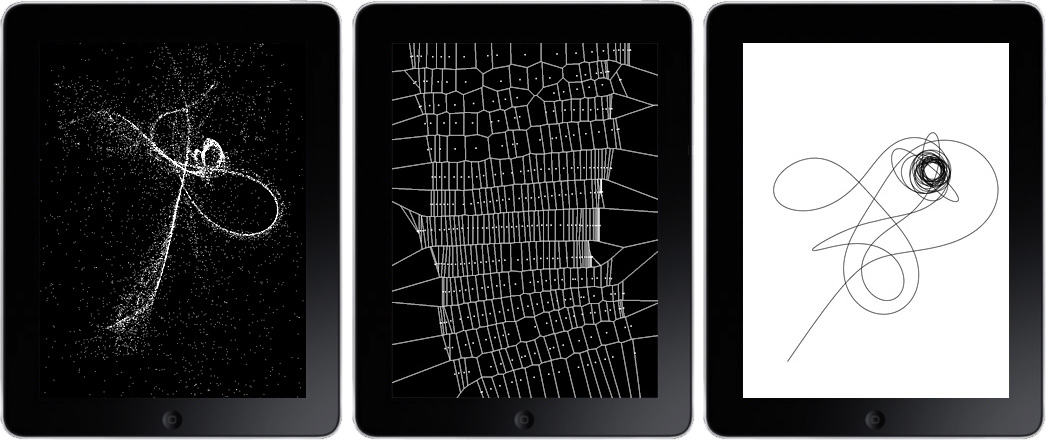
Gravilux, Bubble Harp, and Tripolar, 2010. Apps for iPad, iPhone, and iPod Touch by Scott Snibbe based on interactive artwork for the screen from 1997 to 2002

iPhone art is a form of Interactive art that takes place on the screen of the iPhone, iPad, or iPod Touch. It is distinct from pictorial works of art produced with an iPhone using paint apps such as Brushes, ProCreate, or ArtRage.

iPhone Art evolved from screen-based interactive art that formerly appeared on PC computer screens or on wall-mounted displays in galleries and museums. Due to the portability and ease of distribution with iTunes (formerly) and the App Store, these forms of art are currently experiencing a renaissance as interactive works of art from the 1990s and 2000s are adapted to the iPhone and iPad, some even becoming bestsellers in the Entertainment and Music categories where these apps normally appear, since there is currently no Art category in the iTunes App Store. Most recently, iPhone Art has been used to create NFTs.

Some of the first iPhone artists include Miltos Manetas and Memo Atken, who created the JacksonPollock app, Theo Watson who created FATTAG, Scott Snibbe who created Gravilux and Bubble Harp, and Golan Levin, creator of Yellowtail.

Artists such as David Hockney, Corliss Blakely and Meri Aaron Walker (iPhoneArtGirl) have all held art exhibits with art made exclusively on their iPads. Musician Damon Albarn created the entirety of the art for the 2010 Gorillaz album The Fall, on his iPad with various apps while on his North American tour.

iPhone art may pose a threat to traditional gallery distribution of digital art because individual artists can distribute their apps directly to the general public without working through a gallery dealer.
