= List of interactive artists =

This is a list of artists who work primarily in the medium of interactive art.

== A ==
- Roy Ascott

== B ==
- Artur Barrio
- Maurice Benayoun
- Timothy Binkley
- Maurizio Bolognini
- Geoff Bunn

== C ==
- Peter Campus
- Janet Cardiff
- Thomas Charvériat
- Marcelo Coelho
- Shane Cooper

== D ==
- Char Davies
- Liu Dao (artist collective)
- Mark Divo
- Juan Downey

== E ==
- Ernest Edmonds

== F ==
- Ken Feingold
- Alicia Framis
- Masaki Fujihata

== H ==
- Dominic Harris
- Heather Hart
- Jeppe Hein
- Desmond Paul Henry
- Lynn Hershman Leeson
- Hugo Heyrman
- Perry Hoberman

== I ==
- Toshio Iwai

== J ==
- Christopher Janney
- Miranda July

== K ==
- Eduardo Kac
- Sep Kamvar
- Kimchi and Chips
- Knowbotic Research
- Meeli Kõiva
- Myron Krueger
- Aki Kuroda
- Ryota Kuwakubo

== L ==
- Marc Lee
- Golan Levin
- Jen Lewin
- LIA
- Zachary Lieberman
- Liu Dao
- Marita Liulia
- Rafael Lozano-Hemmer

== M ==
- Ali Miharbi
- George Bures Miller
- monochrom

== N ==
- Michael Naimark
- Mark Napier
- Graham Nicholls

== P ==
- Jim Pallas
- Simon Penny
- Liz Phillips

== R ==
- Ken Rinaldo
- Don Ritter (artist)
- Miroslaw Rogala
- David Rokeby
- Daan Roosegaarde
- Daniel Rozin

== S ==
- Tomás Saraceno
- Tino Sehgal
- Jeffrey Shaw
- Nathaniel Stern
- Scott Snibbe

== T ==
- Marc Tasman
- Rirkrit Tiravanija
- Timo Toots

== U ==
- Camille Utterback

== V ==
- Angelo Vermeulen

== W ==
- Theo Watson

== Z ==
- Ricardo Miranda Zuñiga

== See also ==
- Interactive Art
- Interactive Media
