= Brenda Cleniuk =

Canadian artist and curator (died 2020)

Brenda Cleniuk (died 2020) was a Canadian curator, artist, and art administrator who served as Director of Neutral Ground Contemporary Art Forum (one of a network of Canadian artist-run centres) in Regina, Saskatchewan.

== Life and work ==
Cleniuk had undergraduate degrees in literature, psychology, Fine Art (art history) and had formal training in performing arts disciplines. Cleniuk worked with Neutral Ground for 26 years, from 1991 to 2017. Neutral Ground was founded in 1982 and has hosted over 600 exhibitions of established and emerging artists. In 1996 she co-founded Soil - a Digital Media Suite to provide technological resources and other services for digital media artists, undertaking residencies and commissions some in partnership with Queer City Cinema and Videographe . Cleniuk championed emerging artists working in performance and in interactive and experimental media, including Robin Poitras, Julie Andreyev, Camille Turner, Ken Gregory, Adam Hyde of Radioqualia, Paul Wong, Garnet Hertz and others. In 2008 she won the Mayor's Arts and Business Award for Excellence in Arts Management . Cleniuk was connected to the new media art scene internationally, attending festivals and conferences such as ISEA, PixelAche in Helsinki, and the Performance Network symposium. Her interest in new media art was focused on the interrelationship between technology and the body; the nature of networked technologies; and "how cyberspace could be used for the betterment of the imagination and its use in concept formation, identity, revelation, and the interrelationships between culturally disparate groups."
