= Titwrench =

Titwrench Festival
- Genre: Punk/LoFi Noise; Bedroom Pop; Folk; Performance; Garage; Weirdo
- Locations: Denver, Colorado, U.S. Stockholm, Sweden
- Years active: 2009-present
- Founder: Sarah Slater
- Major events: Installation; Painting; Sculpture fashion crafts workshops yoga visual art film interactive art
- Website: www.titwrench.tumblr.com

Titwrench Festival features women and LGBTQIAP artists and musicians and other underrepresented/emerging artists pushing the boundaries of genre and form. The festival began in 2009 as a showcase for the talent of female-identified people and those in the LGBTQIA communities.

== Purpose ==
Titwrench is a community-based organization that works to create and cultivate audiences and platforms in which the community can come together and celebrate and empower women and LGBTQIAP artists/musicians who are pushing the boundaries of genre and form. Titwrench seeks to cultivate community around these artists, advanced and unconventional music forms, feminist thought, art and ideas and inspire collaborative works among women and LGBTQIA communities in Denver and around the globe. Music should be accessible for all ages, gender identities and communities and they are actively working to create inclusive, fun, safe spaces for all participants of our events.

== History ==
Founder Sarah Slater has long been an active participant in the local music and art community, and when she and former Denver Zine Library volunteer Kristy Fenton came up with the name and the concept for the initial festival, it was a natural next step for Slater's longstanding history of booking shows. Since the festival beginnings it has had many long standing volunteers and has moved through locations throughout Denver. In 2014 and 2018 the festival took place in Stockholm.

=== Awards and mentions ===
1. Best D.I.Y. Festival 2010 - Westword, Best of Denver
2. Best D.I.Y. Festival 2011 - Westword, Best of Denver
