= Adversarial Design =

Type of political design

Adversarial Design is a 2012 book by Carl DiSalvo that examines how design can serve as a means of political engagement and expression. Introducing the concept of adversarial design, DiSalvo argues that designed artifacts—such as objects, interfaces, systems, and events—can challenge dominant narratives, provoke debate, and enable agonistic interaction within democratic societies. Drawing on political theory, particularly the idea of agonism, the book frames design as an inherently political practice and explores how it can be used to question power structures and foster critical discourse across disciplinary boundaries.

== Key concepts ==
Fundamental to Adversarial Design is agonism, a condition of productive contestation and dissensus. Adversarial Design allows for spaces of agonism to flourish and provide resources and opportunities for others to participate in this contestation. As such, “Adversarial” in Adversarial Design paves the way for dissensus, contestational relations and experiences through made designed artefacts and its expression. It is therefore biased and takes divisive positions.

With agonism as foundation to Adversarial Design, these affective aspects of critique and commentary in political discourse aim to generate disagreement and confrontation that are forever ongoing and contestation that is forever looping. Adversarial Design facilitates ongoing questioning, challenging and reframing as a self-reflective mechanism for democracy to be effective.

DiSalvo also draws a distinction between Adversarial Design as political design (design for ongoing contest between force and ideals) and not design for politics, which is designed to support the means of governance. Thus, one of the characteristics of Adversarial Design is the cultivated discernment of political qualities of artefacts and systems.

== Examples ==
Examples include:

- CCD – Me Not Umbrella by Mark Shepard (2009)
- Feral Robotic Dogs by Natalie Jeremijenko (2002)
- Machine Therapy by Kelly Dobson (2007)
- Million Dollar Blocks by SIDL (2003)
- Natural Fuse by Haque Design + Research (2009)
- Oil Standard by Michael Mandiberg (2006)
- Spore 1.1 by Douglas Easterly and Matthew Kenyon (2007)
- State-Machine:Agency by Max Carlson and Ben Cerveny (2005)
- They Rule (2001, 2004, 2011) and Exxon Secrets (2014) by Josh On
- Unfluence by Skye Bender-deMoll and Greg Michalec (2007)

== See also ==
- Critical design
- Critical making
- Critical technical practice
- Tactical media
