= Merz Akademie =

Art, design, and media university in Stuttgart, Germany

- Werkhaus mit Werkschule
- Former names: Merz Akademie, Hochschule fur Gestaltung, Kunst und Medien Stuttgart, staatlich anerkannt
- Type: University
- Established: 1918
- Rector: Barbara M. Eggert
- Students: 250 as of 2012 WS 2014/15
- Location: Stuttgart, Baden-Württemberg, Germany
- Website: Merz Akademie

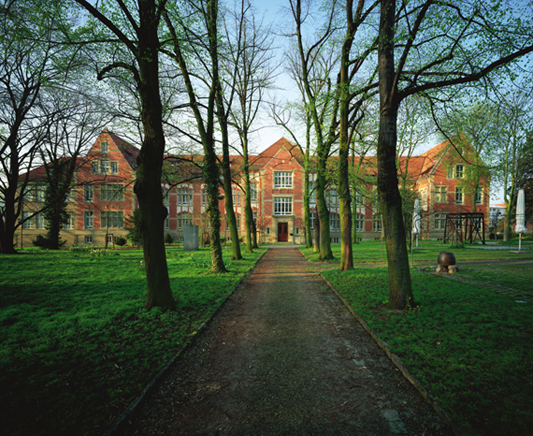
Merz Akademie, College of Art, Design, and Media, Stuttgart

Merz Akademie is a non-profit university of art, design, and media, located in the Berg Kulturpark of Stuttgart, Germany and was established in 1985. Its roots lie in the "Free Academy for Recognition and Design" founded in 1918 by reformist pedagogue Albrecht Leo Merz. Under the direction of Markus Merz, University Rector from 1983 to 2016, the facility received state recognition in 1985. Martin Fritz took over as Rector from 2016 to October 2020, with Maren Schmohl leading the school until in 2023, Barbara M. Eggert took over the position of Rector.

== History ==
Originally named Freie Akademie für Erkennen und Gestalten (Free Academy for Recognition and Design), Merz Akademie was founded in 1918 by Albrecht Leo Merz to resolve the lack of positive human qualities that emerged from the Machine Age. This multi-functional school had a workshop, a kindergarten, and a primary school. It has been offering applied arts, architecture and media program since its inception. The curriculum combined holistic and Progressivism-based approaches. It has a reformist understanding of pedagogy, noting the importance of cultivating the forces of intellect and intuition equally.

The school closed down during World War II but reopened in 1947. Furthermore, the Merz Akademie is now a higher education institution, offering accreditation in the fields of film, video, emerging media and research for Bachelors and master's degree programs.

In 1985, three years after Markus Merz took over at the academy, Merz Akademie was granted state accreditation by the Ministry of Science and Art as a college of higher education (Fachhochschule). Under the management of the Merz Akademie Gemeinnützige, the college GmbH, a non-profit organization, was institutionally accredited by the German Council of Science and Humanities in 2008. This was followed by accreditation for the "Design, Art and Media" Bachelor's program, which included specializations in "Film and Video", "New Media" and "Visual Communication", as well as for the "Information Creation in Design, Art, and Media" Master's degree program.

== Accreditation ==
Run by Merz Akademie gGmbH as a non-profit organization, the university was institutionally accredited by the Science Council in 2008 and 2015, followed by course accreditations for Bachelor and Master courses. Since 2011, the university has been named Merz Akademie, University of Design, Art and Media, Stuttgart.

== Programs ==
Merz Akademie offers Bachelor of Arts degree programs in Film and Video, New Media, Visual Communication, Cross-media publishing, and Cultural Theory. Each major focuses on the design, art, and media aspects of these fields. The university also focuses on research, experimental studies, and integrating analytical studies in design and art.

The Master's program in Art, Design and Media offers students a chance to conduct research projects in the fields of film, video, design, art, new media, and contemporary methods of technical practices.

== Fields of study ==
- Cross-media publishing
- New Media
- Film and Video
- Visual Communication
- Theory of technical practices
- Master of Arts - Artistic Research in Design, Art, and Media

== Publishing ==
Together with Wilhelm Fink Verlag, the Merz Akademie regularly publishes academic research papers and graduate theses.
