= Simon Penny =

Australian artist

- Born: 19 October 1955 (age 70); Melbourne, Australia
- Education: Newington College; South Australian School of Art; Sydney College of the Arts
- Occupations: Artist, theorist, curator and teacher in the fields of digital cultural practices, embodied interaction and interactive art.

Simon Graeme Penny (born 19 October 1955) is an Australian artist, theorist, curator and teacher in the fields of digital cultural practices, embodied interaction and interactive art.

== Early life ==
Penny was born in Melbourne, Australia in 1955. Penny is the older brother of Benjamin Penny (1959) an academic specialising in religious and spiritual movements in modern and contemporary China. He attended Newington College (1968–1973) before receiving an undergraduate diploma in Fine Art from the South Australian School of Art in 1979. He then went on to get his graduate degree form the Sydney College of the Arts in 1982 after which he began focusing on electronic and time-based media.

== Appointments and professorship ==
Penny has held positions as Lecturer at City Art Institute, Sydney from 1984 to 1988, Professor at the University of Florida in 1989 and Professor at Carnegie Mellon University from 1993 to 2001. Since 2001 he has been a professor at University of California, Irvine, where he founded the Arts, Computation and Engineering (ACE) graduate program that was active from 2003 to 2011. He has been a guest professor at the Interdisciplinary Master in Cognitive Systems and Interactive Media (CSIM) at Pompeu Fabra University, (Barcelona) from 2007 to 2013. He is currently resident faculty at the Department of Studio Art at UCI’s Claire Trevor School of the Arts where he teaches mechatronic art, media art history and theory, and contemporary cognitive science and philosophy of mind.

== Artistic career ==
Since the 1980s Penny has been creating interactive and robotic art pieces that address critical issues in digital culture discourses, especially around enactive and embodied interaction. A central concern of his robotic works is the space of interaction between the machine and the human observer. His work is informed by traditions of practice in the arts including sculpture, video-art, installation and performance and has been shown in a number of venues and international art festivals such as ZKM or Ars Electronica.

After a series of early sculptural and kinetic works, in the early 1990s Penny created Petit Mal, which he presented internationally from 1995 to 1997 and again in 2006 after a careful restoration that maintained the original electronic configuration of the piece. Petit Mal is a human-sized robot consisting of two large wheels and a central body that appears to continuously be re-equilibrating itself. It is a robotic work of art that "attempts to explore autonomous behavior as a probe of interactivity and the research field of A-life".

Within his practice-based research on embodied interaction, he subsequently created Sympathetic Sentience, Sympathetic Sentience II, Fugitive and Traces among other works and, more recently, Phatus.

== Academic production ==
Penny’s critical analysis of computer culture and AI has engaged phenomenology, cognitive science and philosophy of mind, anthropology and cognitive archaeology. His current theoretical focus is on the application of post-cognitivist theories of cognition to the theorisation of art, design and cultural practices. This work culminated in the publication of Making Sense – Cognition, Computing, Art and Embodiment (MIT press 2017). He has published over 80 papers on interactive and media art. He curated and produced Machine Culture – the first international survey of interactive installation – at SIGGRAPH 93 in Anaheim, CA – and edited the associated catalogue and anthology. He edited the anthology Critical Issues Critical Issues in Electronic Media (SUNY Press 1995). He has spoken widely on Digital Cultural Practices around the world. He directed and produced Digital Art and Culture 2009 (DAC09) conference (subtitled Beyond Media – Embodiment and Context; A Body of Knowledge – Embodied Cognition and the Arts conference UCI 2016; and An Ocean of Knowledge – Pacific Seafaring, Sustainability and Cultural Survival, UCI 2107. His essays have been published in seven languages.

In his profile as an editor of the Leonardo Electronic Almanac, Penny describes his interests as follows: "My ongoing concern with the negotiation of practices, discourses and commitments in engineering with respect to those of the arts has involved an extended consideration of the history and theory of Artificial Intelligence and the forms of Cognitive Science related to it. These fields enforce a deeply dualising model of human being which is incompatible with practices of the arts. The adoption of computational technology into the arts has the insidious effect of ‘hollowing-out’ long traditions of embodied practices. I have referred to this as a Trojan Horse effect. Fortuitously, over the last two decades, a reaction to such dualising has also occurred in cognitive science. The new distributed, embodied, enactive and situated cognitive sciences address the kinds of embodied practices and sensibilities I have been focusing on in the arts."

== Notable works ==
- Phatus (2010)
- Walleye (2006-2009)
- Body Electric (2006)
- Fugitive II (2004)
- Bedlam (2003)
- Traces (1999)
- Petit Mal (1993)
- Big Father (1991–1992)
- Pride of Our Young Nation (1990–1991)
- Lo Yo Yo (1988)
- Stupid Robot (1987)

== See also ==
- Critical making
- Critical technical practice
- Robotic art
