= Critical making =

Critical making refers to the hands-on productive activities that link digital technologies to society. It was invented to bridge the gap between creative, physical, and conceptual exploration. The term "critical making" was popularized by Matt Ratto, an associate professor at the University of Toronto. Ratto describes one of the main goals of critical making as a way "to use material forms of engagement with technologies to supplement and extend critical reflection and, in doing so, to reconnect our lived experiences with technologies to social and conceptual critique."

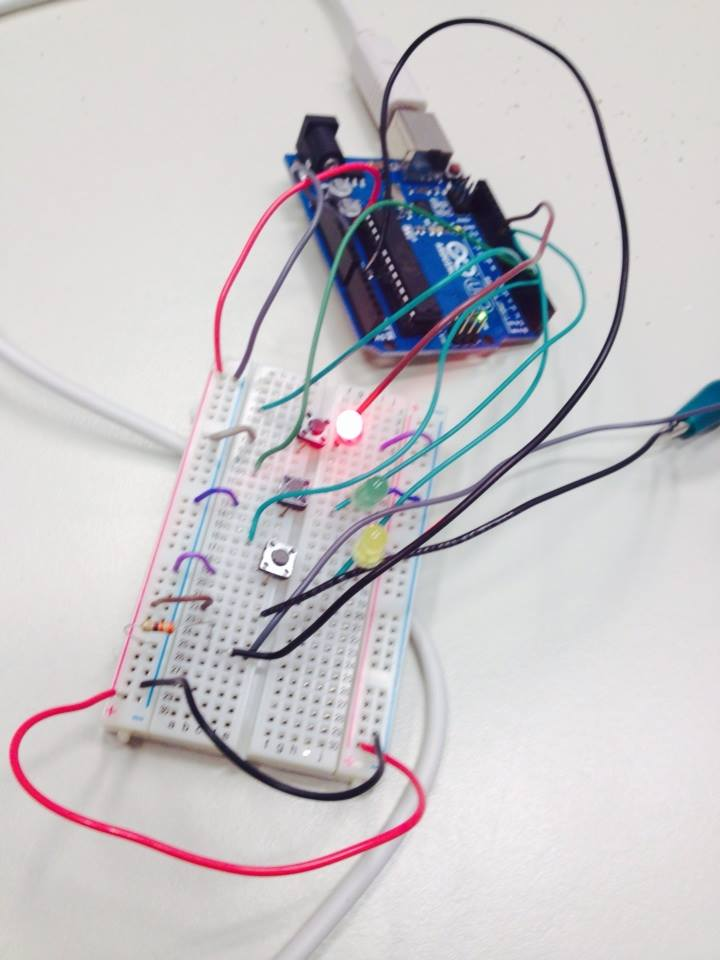
Arduino Hardware

== History of Critical Making ==
=== Matt Ratto and Critical Making at University of Toronto ===
Matt Ratto coined the term in 2008 to describe his workshop activities that linked conceptual reflection and technical making. This concept explores how learning is influenced by the learner's participation towards creating and/or making things within a technological context. Ratto's first publication to use the term was in 2009. Ratto believes that critical making enhances the shared experience in both theoretical and practical understandings of critical socio-technical issues. However, critical making should not be reviewed as design, but rather as a type of practice. The quality of a critical making lab is evaluated based on the physical "making" process, regardless of the quality of the final material production. The main focus of critical making is an open design, developing a critical perspective on the current institutions, practices, and norms of society.

The Critical Making Lab was founded by Matt Ratto in the Faculty of Information, University of Toronto. The Critical Making Lab has the mission to enhance collaboration, communication, and practice-based engagement in critical making.

=== Eric Paulos and Critical Making at UC Berkeley ===
In 2012, Eric Paulos launched Critical Making as a studio course at UC Berkeley. This Critical Making course was designed to operationalize and critique the practice of “making” through both foundational literature and hands-on studio culture. As hybrid practitioners, students develop fluency in readily collaging and incorporating a variety of physical materials and protocols into their practice. With design research as a lens, students envision and create future computational experiences that critically explore social and culturally relevant technological themes such as community, privacy, environment, education, economics, energy, food, biology, democracy, activism, healthcare, social justice, etc. The course has been offered continuously since 2012 and featured publicly at showcases and exhibitions, including Maker Faire as well as other public venues. Selected projects are archived online on the course website.

=== Garnet Hertz and Critical Making at UC Irvine and Emily Carr University ===
In 2012, Garnet Hertz adopted the term for a series of ten handmade booklets titled "Critical Making," published in 2012 when he was working at University of California Irvine. It explores how hands-on productive work can extend critical reflection on technology and society. It works to blend and extend the fields of design, contemporary art, DIY/craft, and technological development. In this project, 70 different authors - including Norman White, Julian Bleecker, Dunne & Raby, Daniel Charny, Albert Borgmann, Golan Levin, Matt Ratto, Natalie Jeremijenko, McKenzie Wark, Paul Dourish, Mitch Altman, Dale Dougherty, Mark Pauline, Scott Snibbe, Reed Ghazala and others - reflected on the term and critical responses to the maker movement. Generally speaking, Hertz's use of the term critical making is focused around studio production and the creation of objects as "things to think with".

Hertz's project consisted of academic papers, detailed technical projects, interviews, and documented pieces of artwork. He then categorized the information into specific topics, thereby producing multiple booklets. The project also stemmed from a specific disappointment of Make partnering with the US military through DARPA funding in 2012. Many opposed this move, including Mitch Altman, and Hertz's project worked to explore the mixture of making, technology, politics and ethics - as well as bringing the fields of critical design and media arts into conversation with maker culture.

In 2014, Hertz founded "The Studio for Critical Making" at Emily Carr University of Art and Design as Canada Research Chair in Design and Media Arts. The facility "explores how humanities-based modes of critical inquiry – like the arts and ethics – can be directly applied to building more engaging product concepts and information technologies. The lab works to replace the traditional engineering goals of efficiency, speed, or usability with more complex cultural, social, and human-oriented values. The end result is a technology that is more culturally relevant, socially engaged, and personalized."

=== John Maeda and Critical Making at Rhode Island School of Design ===
In 2012, John Maeda began using the term while at the Rhode Island School of Design (RISD): first as a title for their strategic plan for 2012-2017 and next as part of the title of an edited collection titled "The Art of Critical Making: Rhode Island School of Design on Creative Practice" published by John Wiley & Sons, Inc. Other individuals who use the term critical making to orient their work include Amaranth Borsuk (University of Washington-Bothell), Jentery Sayers (University of Victoria), Roger Whitson (Washington State University), Kari Kraus (University of Maryland), Amy Papaelias (SUNY-New Paltz), and Jessica Barness (Kent State University).

== Concepts Related to Critical Making ==
=== Speculative Design and Critical Making ===
According to DiSalvo and Lukens, "Speculative design is an approach to design that emphasizes inquiry, experimentation, and expression, over usability, usefulness or desirability. A particular characteristic of speculative design is that it tends to be future-oriented. However, this should not be mistaken as being fantasy-like sense, suggesting that it is "unreal" and therefore dismissible (DiSalvo and Lukens, 2009)."

The term speculative design involves practices from various disciplines, including visionary or futurist forms of architecture, design fiction, and critical design or design for debate instead of referring to a specific movement or style. More than just diagrams of unbuilt structures, the speculative design aims to explore the space of interaction between culture, technology, and the built environment (Lukens and DiSalvo, 2012, p. 25). Practitioners of speculative design engage in design as a sort of provocation, one that asks uncomfortable questions about the long-term implications of technology. These practices also integrate pairs of concerns that are traditionally separate, such as fact and fiction, science and art, and commerce and academia. This provocation extends to questions about design itself.

== See also ==
- Adversarial design
- Critical technical practice
- Critical thinking
- Critical design
- Speculative design
- Maker culture
- Technology
- Arduino
- 3D Printing
