= Bonnie Nardi =

American academic

- Education: PhD
- Occupations: Professor, anthropologist
- Employer: University of California, Irvine
- Known for: Human–computer interaction
- Website: https://artifex.org/~bonnie/

Bonnie A. Nardi is an emeritus professor in the Department of Informatics at the University of California, Irvine, where she led the TechDec research lab in human-computer interaction and computer-supported cooperative work. She is well known for her work on activity theory, interaction design, games, social media, and society and technology. She was elected to the ACM CHI Academy in 2013. She retired in 2018.

== Education ==
Nardi received her undergraduate degree from the University of California, Berkeley, and her PhD from the School of Social Sciences at the University of California, Irvine. Nardi also spent a year in Western Samoa doing postdoctoral research.

== Work ==
Prior to teaching at the University of California, Nardi worked at AT&T Labs, Agilent, Hewlett-Packard, and Apple Labs. She is among the anthropologists who have been employed by high-tech companies to examine consumers' behavior at home and in the office.

She co-founded the Center for Research in Sustainability, Collapse-preparedness, and Information Technology.

Nardi collaborated with Victor Kaptelinin to write Acting with Technology: Activity Theory and Interaction Design (2009) and Activity Theory in HCI: Fundamentals and Reflections (2012). These works discuss activity theory and offer a basis for understanding our relationship with technology.

== Interests ==
Her interests are in the areas of human-computer interaction, computer supported cooperative work, more specifically in activity theory, computer-mediated communication, and interaction design. Nardi has researched CSCW applications and blogging, and pioneered the study of World of Warcraft in HCI. She has studied the use of technology in offices, hospitals, schools, libraries and laboratories.

Nardi's book, Information Ecologies, inspired the title of a UK conference Information Ecologies: the impact of new information 'species' hosted, inter alia, by the UK Office of Library Networking, now known by its acronym UKOLN, and led to a keynote address by Nardi at a 1998 Library of Congress Institute on Reference Service in a Digital Age.

According to Oklahoma Senator Tom Coburn's Wastebook 2010, Nardi received a $100,000 grant to "analyze and understand the ways in which players of World of Warcraft, a popular multiplayer game, engage in creative collaboration". In Coburn's list of 100 supposedly-wasteful federal spending projects, Nardi's project came in at number 6, with Coburn's report saying, "Most people have to work for a living, others get to play video games."

Nardi's My Life as a Night Elf Priest is one of the best known ethnographies of World of Warcraft.

== Selected bibliography ==
- Kaptelinin, V.; Nardi, Bonnie (2012). Activity Theory in HCI: Fundamentals and Reflections. San Rafael, CA: Morgan & Claypool. doi:10.2200/S00413ED1V01Y201203HCI013. ISBN 978-1-60845-705-2.
- Nardi, Bonnie (2010). My Life as a Night Elf Priest: An Anthropological Account of the World of Warcraft. Ann Arbor, MI: University of Michigan Press. ISBN 978-0-472-05098-7.
- Kaptelinin, V.; Nardi, Bonnie (2006). Acting with Technology: Activity Theory and Interaction Design. Cambridge: MIT Press. ISBN 978-0-262-51331-9.
- Nardi, Bonnie; O'Day, V. (1999). Information Ecology: Using Technology with Heart. Cambridge: MIT Press. p. 288.
- Nardi, Bonnie, ed. (1996). Context and Consciousness: Activity Theory and Human-Computer Interaction. Cambridge: MIT Press. ISBN 978-0-262-14058-4.
- Nardi, Bonnie (1993). A Small Matter of Programming: Perspectives on End User Computing. Cambridge: MIT Press. ISBN 978-0-262-14053-9.
- Nardi, Bonnie (1993). "Beyond bandwidth: Dimensions of connection in interpersonal interaction". The Journal of Computer-supported Cooperative Work. 14 (2): 91–130. doi:10.1007/s10606-004-8127-9. S2CID 207108591.
- Nardi, Bonnie; Schiano, Diane; Gumbrecht, Michelle; Swartz, Luke (2004). "Why We Blog". Communications of the ACM. December (12): 41–46. doi:10.1145/1035134.1035163. S2CID 13334346.
- Nardi, Bonnie; Whittaker, Steve; Schwarz, Heinrich (2002). "NetWORKers and their activity in intensional networks". The Journal of Computer-supported Cooperative Work. 11 (1/2): 205–242. doi:10.1023/A:1015241914483. S2CID 32569364.
- Nardi, B., D. Schiano, and M. Gumbrecht (2004). Blogging as social activity, or, Would you let 900 million people read your diary? Proceedings of the Conference on Computer-Supported Cooperative Work. New York: ACM Press, pp. 222–228.
- Nardi, B., S. Whittaker, and E. Bradner (2000). Interaction and Outeraction: Instant messaging in action. Proceedings Conference on Computer-supported Cooperative Work. New York: ACM Press, pp. 79–88.
- Gantt, M. and B. Nardi (1992). Gardeners and gurus: Patterns of collaboration among CAD users. Proceedings of the ACM Conference on Human Factors in Computer Systems, pp. 107–117.
- Nardi, B., and J. Miller (1990). An ethnographic study of distributed problem solving in spreadsheet development. Proceedings of the Conference on Computer-Supported Cooperative Work, pp. 197–208.

== See also ==
- Digital anthropology
- Information ecology
- Digital library
- Digital librarian
- Lucy Suchman
- Terry Winograd
- Mark Weiser
- Paul Dourish
