= Philip Agre =

Internet researcher and educator

Philip E. Agre
- Education: Massachusetts Institute of Technology
- Known for: critical technical practice
- Scientific career
- Fields: Computer science, information studies
- Workplaces: University of California, Los Angeles; University of Chicago; University of Sussex
- Thesis: The Dynamic Structure of Everyday Life (1988)
- Doctoral advisor: Michael Brady, Rodney Brooks

Philip E. Agre is an American artificial intelligence researcher and humanities professor, formerly a faculty member at the University of California, Los Angeles. He is known for his critiques of technology and for introducing critical technical practice. Agre was reported missing on October 16, 2009. He was found on January 16, 2010, but never returned to public life.

== Biography ==
Agre grew up in Maryland and attended college early. Agre and his collaborator David Chapman started their PhDs under the supervision of Michael Brady at the MIT AI Lab. Upon Brady's departure for Oxford, they switched to a then-recent arrival at the laboratory, Rodney Brooks. Brooks gave the two young scientists relatively free rein, but together the three were seen as early major researchers in Nouvelle AI, an approach to artificial intelligence emphasizing behavior as emerging in interaction with the environment rather than the entire codification of behavior. This is illustrated by Agre and Chapman's 1989 article, "What are plans for?" This work is considered seminal to reactive planning, though neither researcher approved of the term.

Agre went on to receive his doctorate in Electrical Engineering and Computer Science from MIT in 1989. He then took a position in the University of Chicago Department of Computer Science, later joining the School of Cognitive and Computing Sciences (now the School of Informatics) at the University of Sussex and finally the Department of Information Studies at the University of California, Los Angeles.

In 2009, Agre left his position at UCLA and withdrew from public life.

== Surveillance and Capture ==
Agre's essay "Surveillance and Capture" deals with privacy and surveillance issues made possible by our constantly evolving technological age. Influential works preceding this essay include George Orwell's Nineteen Eighty-Four (1949), Hans Magnus Enzensberger's Constituents of a Theory of the Media (1970), and Michel Foucault's works surrounding the concept of panopticism. Foucault argues that a constant exercise of such surveillance is not necessary, since its mere possibility induces self-restrained action among the inmates.

== Criticism of conservatism ==
Agre has argued that conservatism is "the domination of society by an aristocracy," that it "is incompatible with democracy, prosperity, and civilization in general," and that "it is a destructive system of inequality and prejudice that is founded on deception and has no place in the modern world." He also argued that "most of the people who call themselves 'conservatives' have little notion of what conservatism even is."

== Disappearance ==
On October 16, 2009, Agre's sister filed a missing persons report for Agre. She indicated that she had not seen him since the spring of 2008 and became concerned when she learned that he had abandoned his apartment and job sometime between December 2008 and May 2009. Agre was found by the LA County Sheriff's Department on January 16, 2010, and was deemed in good health and self-sufficient.

== Publications ==
=== Books and chapters ===
- Agre, Philip E. (2004). "Social Skills and the Progress of Citizenship". In Feenberg, Andrew; Barney, Darin (eds.). Community in the Digital Age: Philosophy and Practice. Lanham: Rowman & Littlefield. ISBN 978-0-7425-2959-5.
- —————— (2004). "Internet Research: For and Against". In Consalvo, Mia; Baym, Nancy; Hussinger, Jeremy; Jensen, Klaus Bruhn; Logie, John; Murero, Monica; Shade, Leslie Regan (eds.). Internet Research Annual: Selected Papers from the Association of Internet Researchers Conferences, 2000-2002. Vol. 1. New York: Peter Lang. ISBN 978-0-8204-6840-2.
- —————— (2003). "Information and Institutional Change: The Case of Digital Libraries". In Bishop, Ann P.; Van House, Nancy A.; Buttenfield, Barbara P. (eds.). Digital Library Use: Social Practice in Design and Evaluation. Cambridge: MIT Press. ISBN 978-0-262-02544-7.
- —————— (2003). "Writing and Representation". In Mateas, Michael; Sengers, Phoebe (eds.). Narrative Intelligence. Amsterdam: John Benjamins Publishing Company. ISBN 978-90-272-5171-8.
- —————— (2002). "The Practical Logic of Computer Work". In Scheutz, Matthias (ed.). Computationalism: New Directions. Cambridge: MIT Press. ISBN 978-0-262-19478-5.
- —————— (1998). "Designing Genres for New Media: Social, Economic, and Political Contexts". In Jones, Steven G. (ed.). Cybersociety 2.0: Revisiting Computer-Mediated Communication and Community. Thousand Oaks: SAGE Publications. pp. 69–100. doi:10.4135/9781452243689.n3. ISBN 978-0-7619-1462-4.
- —————— (1997). Computation and Human Experience. Cambridge: Cambridge University Press. ISBN 978-0-521-38603-6.
- —————— (1997). "Living Math: Lave and Walkerdine on the Meaning of Everyday Arithmetic". In Kirshner, David; Whitson, James A. (eds.). Situated Cognition: Social, Semiotic, and Psychological Perspectives. Mahwah: Lawrence Erlbaum Associates, Publishers. ISBN 978-0-8058-2037-9.
- .—————— (1997). "Introduction: Computing as a Social Practice". In Agre, Philip E.; Schuler, Douglas (eds.). Reinventing Technology, Rediscovering Community: Critical Explorations of Computing as a Social Practice. Greenwich: Ablex Publishing. ISBN 978-1-56750-258-9.
- —————— (1997). "Beyond the Mirror World: Privacy and the Representational Practices of Computing". In Agre, Philip E.; Rotenberg, Marc (eds.). Technology and Privacy: The New Landscape. Cambridge: MIT Press. ISBN 978-0-262-01162-4.
- —————— (1997). "Toward a Critical Technical Practice: Lessons Learned in Trying to Reform AI". In Bowker, Geoffrey C; Gasser, Les; Star, Susan Leigh; Turner, William (eds.). Bridging the Great Divide: Social Science, Technical Systems, and Cooperative Work. Mahwah: Lawrence Erlbaum Associates, Publishers. ISBN 978-0-8058-2403-2.
- —————— (1996). "Introduction: Computational Theories of Interaction and Agency". In Agre, Philip E.; Rosenschein, Stanley J. (eds.). Computational Theories of Interaction and Agency. Cambridge: MIT Press. ISBN 978-0-2625-1090-5.

=== Selected academic works ===
- Agre, Philip E. (July 2003). "Hierarchy and History in Simon's 'Architecture of Complexity'". Journal of the Learning Sciences. 12 (3): 413–426. doi:10.1207/S15327809JLS1203_4.
- Agre, Philip E. (October 2002). "Real-Time Politics: The Internet and the Political Process". The Information Society. 18 (5): 311–331. doi:10.1080/01972240290075174.
- Agre, Philip E. (June 2002). "Cyberspace As American Culture". Science as Culture. 11 (2): 171–189. doi:10.1080/09505430220137234.
- Agre, Philip E. (December 2001). "Supporting the intellectual life of a democratic society". Ethics and Information Technology. 3 (4): 289–298. doi:10.1023/A:1013837409419.
- —————— (2000). "Commodity and Community: Institutional Design for the Networked University". Planning for Higher Education. 29 (2): 5–14 – via Society for College and University Planning.
- Agre, Philip E. (January 2000). "Infrastructure and Institutional Change in the Networked University". Information, Communication & Society. 3 (4): 494–507. doi:10.1080/13691180010002323.
- Agre, Philip E. (1999). "The Distances of Education". Academe. 85 (5): 37–41. doi:10.2307/40251767. JSTOR 40251767.
- —————— (1999). "Information Technology in Higher Education: The "Global Academic Village" and Intellectual Standardization". On the Horizon. 7 (5): 8–11. ISSN 1074-8121 – via University of California, Los Angeles.
- Agre, Philip E. (January 1999). "THE ARCHITECTURE OF IDENTITY: Embedding privacy in market institutions". Information, Communication & Society. 2 (1): 1–25. doi:10.1080/136911899359736.
- Agre, P.; Horswill, I. (April 1997). "Lifeworld Analysis". Journal of Artificial Intelligence Research. 6: 111–145. arXiv:cs/9704101. doi:10.1613/jair.342.
- —————— (1995). "Institutional Circuitry: Thinking About the Forms and Uses of Information". Information Technology and Libraries. 14 (4): 225–230 – via University of California, Los Angeles.
- —————— (1995). Guzeldere, Guven; Franchi, Stefano (eds.). "Constructions of the Mind: Artificial Intelligence and the Humanities". Stanford Humanities Review. 4 (2): 1–19 – via University of California, Los Angeles.
- Agre, Philip E. (January 1982). The Assq Chip and Its Progeny (Report). hdl:1721.1/41168.

=== Other articles in the media ===
- Agre, Philip E. (December 2006). "Welcome to the Always-On World". IEEE Spectrum. pp. 10, 13. Archived from the original on December 6, 2006.
- —————— (Winter 2001). "Your Face Is Not a Bar Code: Arguments Against Automatic Face Recognition in Public Places". Whole Earth Review. No. 106. pp. 74–77.
- —————— (1999). "Life After Cyberspace". EASST Review. Vol. 18, no. 2/3. European Association for the Study of Science and Technology. pp. 3–5.
- —————— (July 3, 1998). "Yesterday's Tomorrow". Times Literary Supplement. News UK. pp. 3–4. ISSN 0307-661X.
