= Liu Dao =

- Liu Dao
- Born: Liu Dao; April 1, 2006 (age 19); Shanghai, China
- Known for: Electronic art, digital art, new media art
- Patrons: Louis Vuitton
- Website: www.liudao.org

Liu Dao (a Pinyin phrase meaning "island number 6" – Chinese: 六岛; pinyin: Liù dǎo, Mandarin: [ljôu tɑ̀ʊ]) is an international multidisciplinary art collective based at the island6 Arts Center in 50 Moganshan Road M50, contemporary art district Shanghai, China.

== History ==
Liu Dao was founded in 2006 by island6 Arts Center under the direction of French curator Thomas Charvériat. Liu Dao is an electronic art group composed of multimedia artists, engineers, painters, performance artists, photographers, curators and writers. Their work focuses on interactive art installations that explore the effects that "technologies have on our perception and modes of communication" but also on LED art, photography, modern sculpture and paintings.

Liu Dao has mainly exhibited at island6 Arts Center, island6 ShGarden, island6 Bund in Shanghai, island6 Hong Kong in Sheung Wan and island6 Marina in Phuket, Thailand. In August 2015 their work was exhibited at SISEA 2015; an exhibition at the China Art Museum which explored the relationships between science, technology and art.

Liu Dao's artworks were taken into White Rabbit Gallery's collection of Chinese contemporary art in Sydney as "a less literal and more expressionistic lens" of cultural shifts in China, among artworks from artists such as Bingyi and Cang Xin, and in 2010 were brought into the Louis Vuitton gallery of Macau.

== Production process ==
Liu Dao embraces the use of digital technology to express the emotions and thoughts which arise from what it considers the vivid and hectic environment of Shanghai in the 21st Century. The group claims its collective and communal spirit prevents the art from becoming mainstream or stagnant. The process of creating art works typically begins with a curator developing a concept or theme. He or she then writes a short synopsis which is the basis for which new works will be made. Those works are developed by having an artistic director work with the artists to interpret the theme through varying visual mediums. The majority of Liu Dao's works involve LEDs. A simple movement is arranged by choreographers and coordinated by in-house art directors, which is then video recorded and turned into an LED representation. Homemade software is used to match colors and to create an animated sequence of bitmaps.

Red Gate Gallery, the oldest private art gallery in China, describes the process of Liu Dao as technology becoming organic: "digital reality comes alive, where it begins to speak, dream, conspire, and seduce." It refers to the works as "voyeuristic fantasies", "paraphilia", and "visually rhyming".

Collaboration

As noted by The China Post, all of Liu Dao's works are created by multiple artists, as the group places emphasis on cooperation and collaboration in order to increase the wealth of ideas and evolution of conceptual projects. Artworks are conceived through discussions between a curator and art director in which a curatorial theme is devised, written in a statement, and shared with the artists. After feedback and conceptual development, the artists work with the onsite technicians in order to design the implementation strategy.

The credits for each piece run similar to those found in a film, with writers, directors, models, cameramen, technicians, painters, programmers, choreographers and editors. This process runs as a direct opposite to artists with many employees working for them who are never credited at all.

== Themes ==
History and tradition

Liu Dao tends to use a multitude of influences, references and styles from Chinese art and Chinese history in their works, such as cranes (the Chinese symbol of longevity), Chinese paper cutting, Xuan paper, and Maoist and Communist imagery. Similar to the theme of urbanization, the technology and modernity that are found in Shanghai, where Liu Dao are based, are main features of the collective's topics, as a reverberation of Chinese traditional life becoming "electrified". Visual compositions often combine LED animation with Chinese paper cuts to take a customary picture and bring it into the 21st Century technological landscape. Journalist Jasmina Najjar wrote that the Liu Dao collective's work "...shows that art really has the power to transcend borders and to open creative dialogues between cities and talents from different disciplines."

Interactivity

Liu Dao artworks often feature modernized characteristics of conventional art, bringing to light the subject of China's reaction and contribution to globalization, while artworks "demand" interaction through sensors, motion-tracking devices, GPRS modem controlled videos, or sonar rangefinders which help "artists and technologists actively engage with culture".

Awards and honors

In April 2010, Liu Dao was selected by Louis Vuitton for an exhibition curated by Jonathan Thomson in the Louis Vuitton Maison, to be the second art intervention to animate their Taipei building.

In September 2010, Liu Dao was again selected by Louis Vuitton to take part in an art exhibition, Raining Stars, in the Louis Vuitton cultural space in Macau, focusing on the global experience of fireworks.

Liu Dao was nominated for the Sovereign Art Foundation's annual charity art prize in 2010, and Liu Dao's member Rose Tang had her first solo exhibition, "Roseless".

== Publications ==
- 2011 "island6 Art Collective" by Thomas Charvériat and Peter Bradt; FoldPress Publications – ISBN 978-0-9549960-3-1. 2010
- 2010 "Liu Dao" by Thomas Charvériat and Peter Bradt; FoldPress Publications

== Bibliography ==
- Ching Ling Loo, "A Quick, Irreverent Note on Art Prices" KIOSK, May 2012
- Ching Ling Loo, "New Frontiers. New Media Art" KIOSK, March 2012
- Eva Martin, "Interview with island6" SHANGHAI 24/7, January 2012
- "HK Artfair 2011", HARPER'S BAZAAR, July 2011, July 2011, ISSN 1673-0828
- interview by G. A. Rhodes, ELLE MAN MAGAZINE, September 2011, 这个世界不需要又一个伍迪.艾伦 (p. 325)
- P. Bollmann (Ed.), Kerber, FOCUS ASIA: INSIGHTS INTO THE WEMHÖNER COLLECTION, 2011 (p. 150–153)
- J. INGLEDEW, Laurence King, THE A-Z OF VISUAL IDEAS, 2011 (pp. 49, 113, 118–119, 162–163)
- Jo Baker, "Comfort Zones", SILKROAD INFLIGHT MAGAZINE, November 2011, (p. 64)
- Deepika Shetty, "Tang art goes pop", THE STRAITS TIMES, July 21, 2011 arts section (p. C2)
- Matthew Neckelmann, 'An island in the ‘hai', that's Shanghai, April 29, 2009
