= Life Cube Project =

- Genre: Installation Art
- Founder: Scott Cohen
- Website: www.lifecubeproject.com

The Life Cube Project is a community interactive art installation based upon the creator's idea that if you write something down, it is far more likely to happen. The Life Cube installation encourages members of the community and the general public to decorate it with inspirational writing, paintings, drawings, murals, and tapestries for all its visitors to see. Through four iterations at the annual Burning Man festival in 2011, 2012, 2013, and 2015; hundreds of thousands of participants touched, climbed, inscribed, painted, and added their personal visions to the Life Cube. In 2014, the Life Cube Project made its way out of Burning Man and into its first major city in the United States as experiential and interactive art.

== Burning Man history ==
Over the course of three years, and returning as a Burning Man Project Honorarium project in 2015, the Artist and his project team designed, built, and burned Life Cubes at Burning Man. The first Life Cube, an eight-foot square, was planned in 2010 and erected in 2011, and the artist was motivated to build another version of the Life Cube the following year. In 2012, its dimensions expanded to sixteen feet, enhanced by writable surfaces for greater interactivity and a more creative and graphic external skin. The third Cube came together in 2013. It featured a more complex and compelling multi-level architectural design with a pillared facade, more surfaces for writing and drawing, a tapestry wall, colored strobes and spotlights, and giant painted murals.

=== 2020 ===
Life Cube Project created a virtual Life Cube to be part of the virtual Burning Man 2020. The Cube installation was located in four of the seven "universes", including Sparkleverse, Metaburn, Mysticverse, and BRCVR. The first virtual installation created the opportunity to write down goals and dreams, video chat, and provided a collaborative and interactive experience. The Cube also had over 30 virtual happenings and events including teaching and performances from world class yoga teachers, sound healers. DJs, and other talent. This was the first time the Life Cube Project created a virtual installation, and also the participated in the Burning Man Project since 2015. The installation was open Aug 31 - Sep 6, 2020.

== First urban art ==
In 2013, artist Scott Cohen was invited by the Downtown Project to develop the Life Cube Project for Las Vegas.

In January 2014, a Life Cube was constructed on an entire city block in the East Fremont district of downtown Las Vegas. Open to the public 24/7, local artists and members of the community painted all of its surfaces. The Life Cube was covered in constantly evolving and overlapping murals, hosting handwritten and painted messages from its visitors who wrote their personal hopes and dreams on "wish-stick" postcards and dropped them inside. Locally owned shops, bars, and restaurants joined with the Gay and Lesbian Community Center, churches, and Las Vegas’ City Hall in the project’s goal-setting theme to their constituencies through the satellite cube program. On the night of March 21, the Cube burned in a ceremony involving thousands of participants and viewers.

The Life Cube returned to downtown Las Vegas in March 2016 and burned on April 2, 2016.

== Exhibits and installations ==
In 2015, a non-burning metal and glass Life Cube was featured at the Reno Sculpture Fest. The 12’ sculpture included murals, Tapestry Walls, and art and wishes contributed by 1,000s of schoolchildren with outreach to prison inmates, recovering addicts, and challenged youth. Unlike previous Cubes, where "Wish-Stick" postcards were placed inside and burned, this Cube featured a Wish-Tag Wall, where participants wrote on colorful tags tied to the Cube for others to read.

The Life Cube was also featured in Yerington, NV in 2015 for a non-burning installation created specifically for the Mason Valley Boys and Girls Club. This installation included a Tapestry Wall consisting of 1,500 8′ by 8′ canvas panels and a Wish-Tag Wall created by students, teachers, staff, and volunteers from nine middle schools and high schools in the area. During this installation, artist Scott Cohen was also invited to speak at the Youth of the Year banquet to encourage students to follow their hopes, wishes, and dreams.

In October 2016, the Life Cube Project was featured in its first New York installation at the Riverdale School with participation from students at PS 331 in Bronx, NY. The 12' Cube remained on Jones Lawn for over a week inviting students, parents, faculty, and other visitors to paint, draw, write, and collaborate. This Cube did not burn, but the evolving and inspiring art on the structure invited dozens of participants nonetheless.

The Life Cube Project was invited to El Paso, TX from October 6–8, 2017 for the 10th anniversary of the annual Chalk the Block arts festival, organized by the City of El Paso Museum and Cultural Affairs Department (MCAD). The artist, Scott Cohen, spent ten days leading up to the installation visiting over 20 local schools to talk to students about goal-setting and connecting art with community. He spoke to youth from military families at Fort Bliss as well as folks at Opportunity house, a local shelter. Following these artist talks and workshops, the 12' x 12' brushed metal and canvas Life Cube installation was erected on San Jacinto Square, in the heart of the Arts District of downtown El Paso, and was open to the general public for three days. The Life Cube for Chalk the Block El Paso included all the elements of its signature approach to connecting art and community: live-painting of murals by several local artists, Dream Tags, a Tapestry Wall featuring canvases created by thousands of El Paso students, and—of course—chalk.

In October a Life Cube art exhibit and workshop was featured in the Bass Museum of Art in Miami Beach. The Life Cube will have a community interactive art installation at SoundScape Park at the New World Center in collaboration with the New World Symphony Nov 19-24, 2019.

== Satellites and community ==
Designed and implemented expressly for the Las Vegas Life Cube Project, nearly one hundred four-foot cubes were distributed to various venues where they were decorated by local artists, teachers, and children of all ages in establishments and schools throughout the Valley. Satellite cubes were gathered and returned to the Life Cube site for the final burn, combining their accumulated wishes with those of the Life Cube.

== Burn ==
The burn usually takes place as a closing ceremony for the Life Cube at Burning Man. The Las Vegas Cubes also burned in 2014 and 2016, and required the assistance, support, and approval of over 23 city and state departments and agencies, including the Las Vegas Fire Department, an expert burn master, a burn perimeter team, a plethora of municipal permits, event organizers, a traffic plan, engineering, fire safety and air quality reports, cleanup crews, and additional provisions for security, hygiene, and disposal.
