= Garnet Hertz =

Canadian artist, designer and academic

- Born: Saskatoon, Saskatchewan, Canada
- Known for: Artist, Designer, Writer
- Title: Canada Research Chair of Design and Media Art
- Awards: Fulbright 2003, Oscar Signorini 2008, Canada Research Chair 2013, Canada Research Chair 2019

Academic background
- Education: University of Saskatchewan
- Alma mater: University of California Irvine
- Doctoral advisor: Mark Poster
- Other advisor: Simon Penny

Academic work
- Institutions: University of California, Irvine; Art Center College of Design; Emily Carr University of Art and Design
- Notable ideas: critical making
- Website: https://conceptlab.com/

Garnet Hertz (born 1973) is a Canadian artist, designer and academic. Hertz is formerly Canada Research Chair in Design and Media Art and is known for his electronic artworks and for his research in the areas of critical making and DIY culture.

== Art and Design Work ==
Hertz is known for robotic artworks that are a synthesis of living insects and electronic machinery. His Cockroach Controlled Mobile Robot (2007) uses a giant Madagascan cockroach to control a robot that moves through the gallery space. In his 2001 work Fly with Implanted Web Server, viewers of a specific URL browsed web pages served from inside a biological organism.

Several of his works involve the repurposing of obsolete media technologies. His work OutRun turned an arcade video game cabinet into a street-driveable vehicle. As the vehicle is driven, it converts the camera view of the real street into an 8-bit video screen view that the driver uses to navigate.

== Publications ==
Hertz's publishing works are generally focused on alternative electronic culture in design and art, and include a 10-booklet zine series titled Critical Making, a booklet titled Disobedient Electronics, and a media archaeology book titled A Collection of Many Problems. With Jussi Parikka, Hertz co-authored a paper entitled "Zombie Media: Circuit Bending Media Archaeology into an Art Method," which was nominated for the 2011 Transmediale Vilem Flusser media theory award.

Hertz has also published in the field of human computer interaction, including winning the best paper award with co-authors Silvia Lindtner and Paul Dourish at the ACM Conference for Human Factors in Computing Systems CHI 2014.

He is also author of the academic monograph titled Art + DIY Electronics by MIT Press in the Leonardo series in 2023. The project is described by curator Tina Rivers Ryan as follows: "In this groundbreaking study, Hertz argues that the DIY electronic artists who 'kludge' their own technologies constitute an important artistic countercultural practice that is an urgent response to the escalating failures of our technological infrastructures."

== Academic career ==
Hertz is formerly the Canada Research Chair in Design + Media Arts at Emily Carr University of Art and Design. Hertz was previously Research Scientist and Artist in Residence in the Department of Informatics at the University of California Irvine and was also Faculty in the Media Design Program at the Art Center College of Design. He has also worked at the University of Regina.

In 2024, Hertz taught a university course at Emily Carr University titled "How To Appreciate Graffiti". The course featured several guests, including Smokey D, a well-respected Vancouver graffiti artist.

== Awards ==
In 2003, Hertz won a Canada-U.S. Fulbright Award to pursue graduate studies at the University of California Irvine in an interdisciplinary program in art, computer science and engineering. In 2008, Hertz won the Oscar Signorini prize for robotic art. In 2013, Hertz was awarded a Canada Research Chair as Canada Research Chair in Design and Media Arts. In 2014, Hertz and his co-authors were awarded the CHI Best Paper Award. In 2019, Hertz was awarded a second term as Canada Research Chair as Canada Research Chair in Design and Media Arts.
