= Ken Gregory =

Canadian media artist (born 1960)

- Born: February 28, 1960 (age 66); Edmonton
- Education: Simon Fraser University
- Known for: Media art, Electronic Art, Sound Art
- Notable work: 12 Motor Bells, Wind Coil Sound Flow
- Style: installation, performance
- Movement: Media Art, Sound Art, Electronic Art, Robotic Art, Performance Art
- Patrons: Canada Council for the Arts, Manitoba Arts Council, Winnipeg Arts Council
- Website: web.archive.org/web/20221208195304/http://www.cheapmeat.net/

Ken Gregory (Edmonton, 1960) is a Canadian media artist who works with DIY interface design, hardware hacking, audio, video, and computer programming. He is based in Winnipeg, Manitoba.

== Career ==
Gregory's work has been exhibited internationally in media art and sound art festivals. Exhibition and performance venues include the 7A+11D International Performance Art Festival in 1998, The University of Winnipeg in 2009, The Articule Gallery as a part of the Elektra Festival in 2009, San Jose City Hall in 2010, the Bauhaus Archive in Berlin from 2014 to 2015, and the Video Pool Media Arts Centre in 2019. Gregory's speaking engagements include The Upgrade Vancouver in 2003.

A book about his work published by Plug In Editions was written by Robert Enright in 2004, titled "Cheap Meat Dreams and Acorns: Ken Gregory". His work was also discussed in a book published by the Winnipeg Art Gallery by Shawna Dempsey in 2004 titled "Live in the Centre: An Incomplete and Anecdotal History of Winnipeg Performance Art." Gregory's "Electronic Mail Cards" work from 2003 is also discussed in Garnet Hertz's 2023 book "Art + DIY Electronics" from MIT Press. While discussing artists that use exposed electronic components as a part of their work, Hertz describes Gregory's work as follows:

This type of literal exposure of electronics can be seen in many other artworks as well. Examples include Canadian artist Ken Gregory's Electronic Mail Cards (2003), where postcard-sized circuits that synthesize and play sounds are sent through the postal system. These circuits are constructed with bare electronic components stuck to a piece of cardboard, featuring a computer (the BASIC Stamp microprocessor), support electronics, an audio speaker, batteries, and a miniature LCD that can display messages. The project is a useful example of how both technology and its distribution can be made more transparent with DIY methods: Gregory's dissemination is publicly distributed in a style reminiscent of Fluxus, with no special equipment or expertise required, and no need to go into a gallery space to experience it.

Gregory's electronic art work is also discussed at length in a 2004 article in Border Crossings magazine by Christabel Wiebe:

Gregory is known here as Winnipeg's pre-eminent audio artist, but this doesn't begin to account for the breadth of his skill and range of interest. His works display an appreciable attention to the visual, as sculptural objects enlivened by sound. Viewers have commented that the effect of moving through this exhibition is akin to a visit to the zoo: a park filled with chirping, shrieking, humming noise emanating from exotic creatures. To me, the effect was more like entering an early '80s video gaming den: a repository of computer sounds from the early days of Atari and Pong, a barrage of friendly noise from the likes of Q-bert and Dig-Dug.

In May 2025, Gregory was awarded the 2025 Manitoba Arts Award of Distinction, a $30,000 award that is awarded annually to a professional artist or arts/cultural professional in recognition of the highest level of artistic excellence and contribution to the development of the arts in Manitoba.

== Publications ==
Gregory's body of work has been discussed in several publications since 2003, including the following:

- Plague Fantasies, radio/audio with hannah-g published on bandcamp and CKUW 95.5FM, 2020.
- I woke up this morning, digital video as part of studyuntitledstudy published on Instagram, 2020.
- Dark Bird, Paris to Kiev Remix, with Balanced Records (audio on CD), 2016.
- Sensing the Future: Lazslo Moholy-Nagy: Media and the Arts, Oliver Botar published by Lars Muller and Plugin Editions, 2014.
- Hazmat Kite, Critical Making magazine published by Garnet Hertz, 2012.
- Kite Song 1, published in Musicworks Magazine #99 (audio CD with text and photographs), 2007.
- untitled, audio piece, published by BlackFlash Magazine (audio on DVD), 2007.
- Sonic Waking, with Shawn Pinchbeck and Steve Heimbecker, published by Video Pool (audio CD), 2005.
- Cheap Meat Dreams and Acorns, published by Plugin Editions Winnipeg (monograph with audio CD), 2004.
- under the influence of ether, published in S:ON Sound in Contemporary Canadian Art, edited by Nicole Gingras, published by ARTEXTE (audio on CD), 2003.

== Collections ==
Gregory's work 12 Motor Bells is held in the collection of the National Gallery of Canada, purchased by the institution in 2005. It is described as a sculpture and electro-mechanical audio installation consisting of "twelve fire alarm bells, two infrared sensors, twelve electric motors, computer, custom interface, custom software".
