= Island6 =

Arts centre in Shanghai, China

Island6 Arts Center
- Location of Island6 Arts Center in Shanghai
- Established: 2006
- Location: 50 Moganshan Road, Putuo, Shanghai; China
- Coordinates: 31°15′00″N 121°26′41″E
- Type: Contemporary art
- Directors: Thomas Charveriat, Yeung Sin Ching (杨倩菁), Guan Yan (官彦)
- Website: www.island6.org

Island6 Arts Center (Chinese: 六岛艺术中心) is an artist-run space and creative platform established in Shanghai, China. It was founded in 2006 by French curator/artist Thomas Charvériat.

With three branches in Shanghai, one in Hong Kong and one in Thailand, Island6 aims to support "European and Chinese artists whose work is exhibited in a series of tightly curated group shows."

== History ==
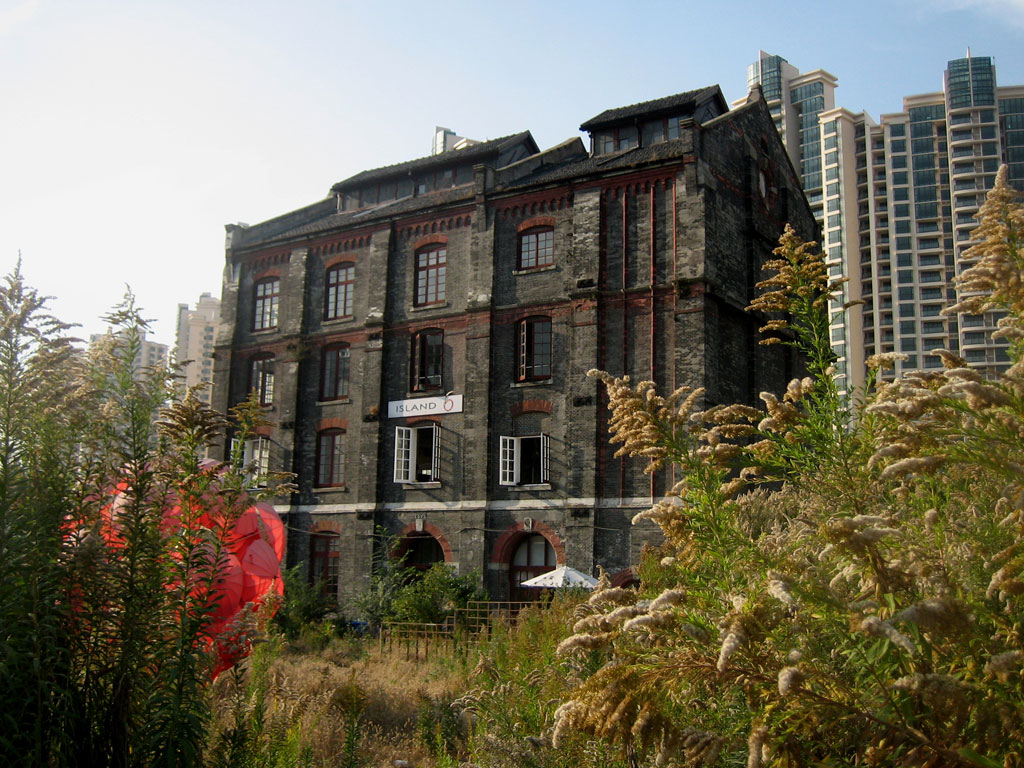
Island6 at The Fou Foong Flour Mill

In 2006, Thomas Charvériat, Margherita Salmaso, Zheng Guoyang, and Kang Jingfang established the Island6 Arts Center at its first location, Fou Foong Flour Mill complex at 120 Moganshan Road in Shanghai. On April 1, 2006, Invisible Layers, Electric Cities became the first art exhibition to be presented at the Center, curated by Allard van Hoorn and Margherita Salmaso. From June 2006 to June 2008, Charvériat assumed the direction of the space. For these two years, Island6 Arts Center was noted for its location in a field of rubble surrounded by "high-rises creeping in from the distance", standing as an example of Shanghai's transformation from old to new.

In June 2008, facing imminent eviction by real estate developers, the Island6 Arts Center was relocated to a space at 50 Moganshan Road, a district of galleries inside old warehouses and factories, where it remains. From its new location at M50, Island6 continues to promote emerging and prominent Chinese and international artists.

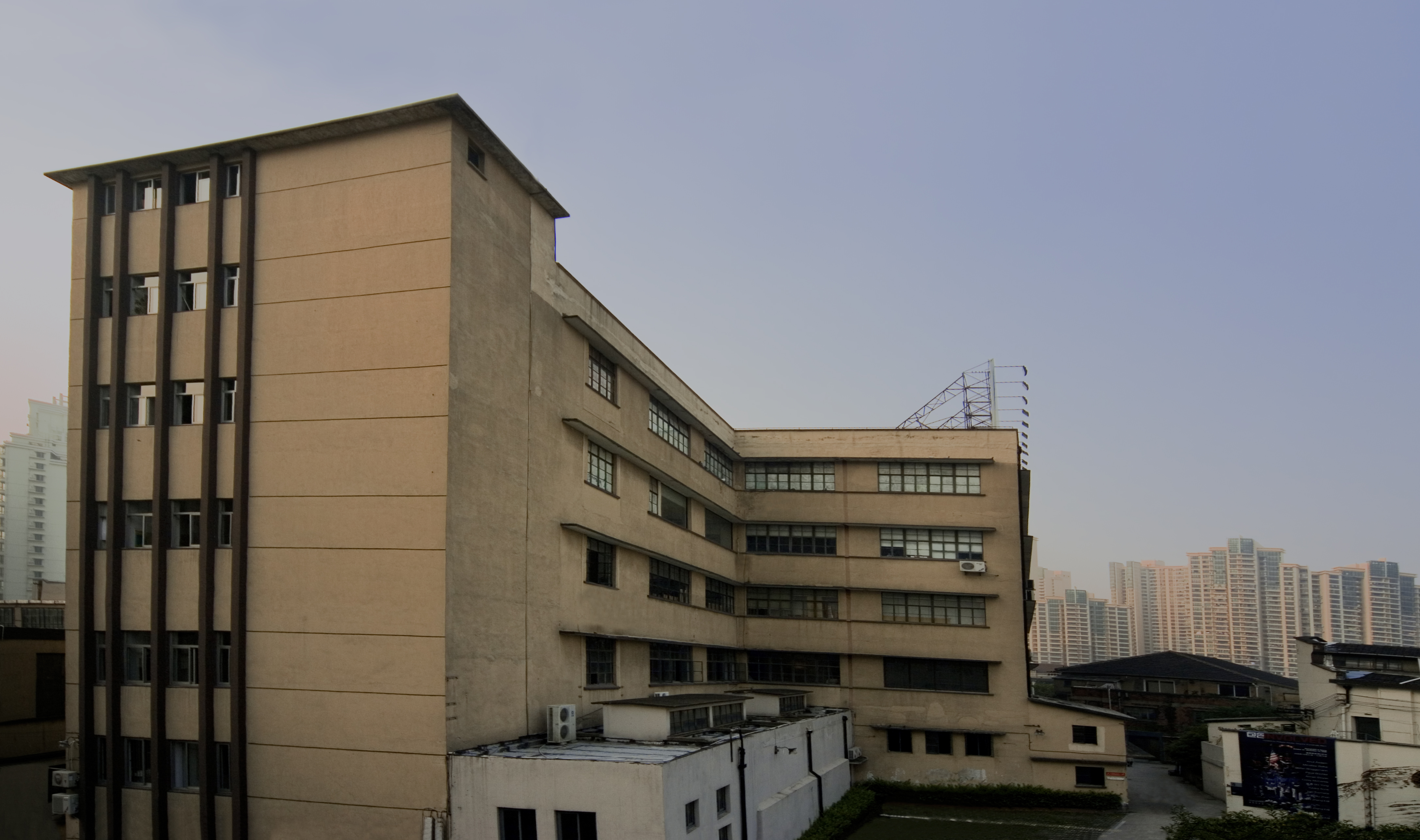
Island6 in the heart of the m50 Art district

Beginning in January 2009, Thomas Charvériat, seconded by Zane Mellupe, took over direction of the space. In 2012, Yeung Sin Ching became the CEO of Island6 Arts Center, Island6 ShGarden and Island6 Bund. In 2015, Island6 was voted "Best Art Gallery" in the City Weekend Reader's Choice Awards.

As of July 2015, the center showed its 76th exhibition. Island6 has exhibited more than 500 artists from 21 different countries, sponsored 139 resident artists and helped in the creation and the production of around 2000 art projects.

== Liu Dao (六岛) Art Collective ==
The art collective Liu Dao is the most frequent and extensive presence in the Island6 Arts Center. The group's works often use video recordings of simple movements to be turned into an animated sequence of bitmaps. The results are LED representations that blink and shift in their own realities. Liu Dao's works tend to move in the themes of sensory engagement, voyeurism, urban development, tradition versus modernity and technology, and Chinese cultural history.

== Collaborations ==
Island6 has collaborated with several high-profile brands. In 2010, it worked with Louis Vuitton to display work at the Louis Vuitton Maison Gallery at One Central Macau for the Raining Stars exhibition.

In May 2010, Red Gate Gallery, Beijing, invited Island6 to showcase the work of Liu Dao at the Hong Kong Art Fair 2010, this went on to Red Gate becoming the representative for Island6's in-house artist collective, Liu Dao, for the 2010 Sydney White Rabbit Collection and at the 2011 SH Contemporary Art Fair. Their partnership was fruitful, having gone on to lead to exhibitions such as the 2010 exhibition of Garden of Autumn Vapours and the 2011 Everyday Frenzies exhibition at Beijing's Green T. House. In 2012, the Red Gate Gallery curated an exhibition of Island6's in-house artists at Swire Hotels, The Opposite House in Beijing. Island6 also put on a solo show at Red Gate Gallery in June 2013.

== Other locations ==
Since April 2006, Island6 Arts Center has had four locations in the Moganshan Lu area, the art district in Shanghai. In 2012 it opened an additional gallery space in Hong Kong located in the north-west of Hong Kong Island. Island6 Hong Kong is situated on No. 1 New Street, an intersection off Queens Road West. Island6 Hong Kong shows new media art that explores contemporary issues in Asia through multimedia and interactive artworks.

In October 2013, Island6 opened a third space in Shanghai, this time on the Bund. The space is located at the site of the former Studio Rouge, on the corner of Fuzhou Lu and Zhongshan Lu. The space is managed by voluntary staff and artists based in Shanghai, and is dedicated to the support of the Island6 art collective, Liu Dao.
