= Paul Dourish =

British-American computer scientist

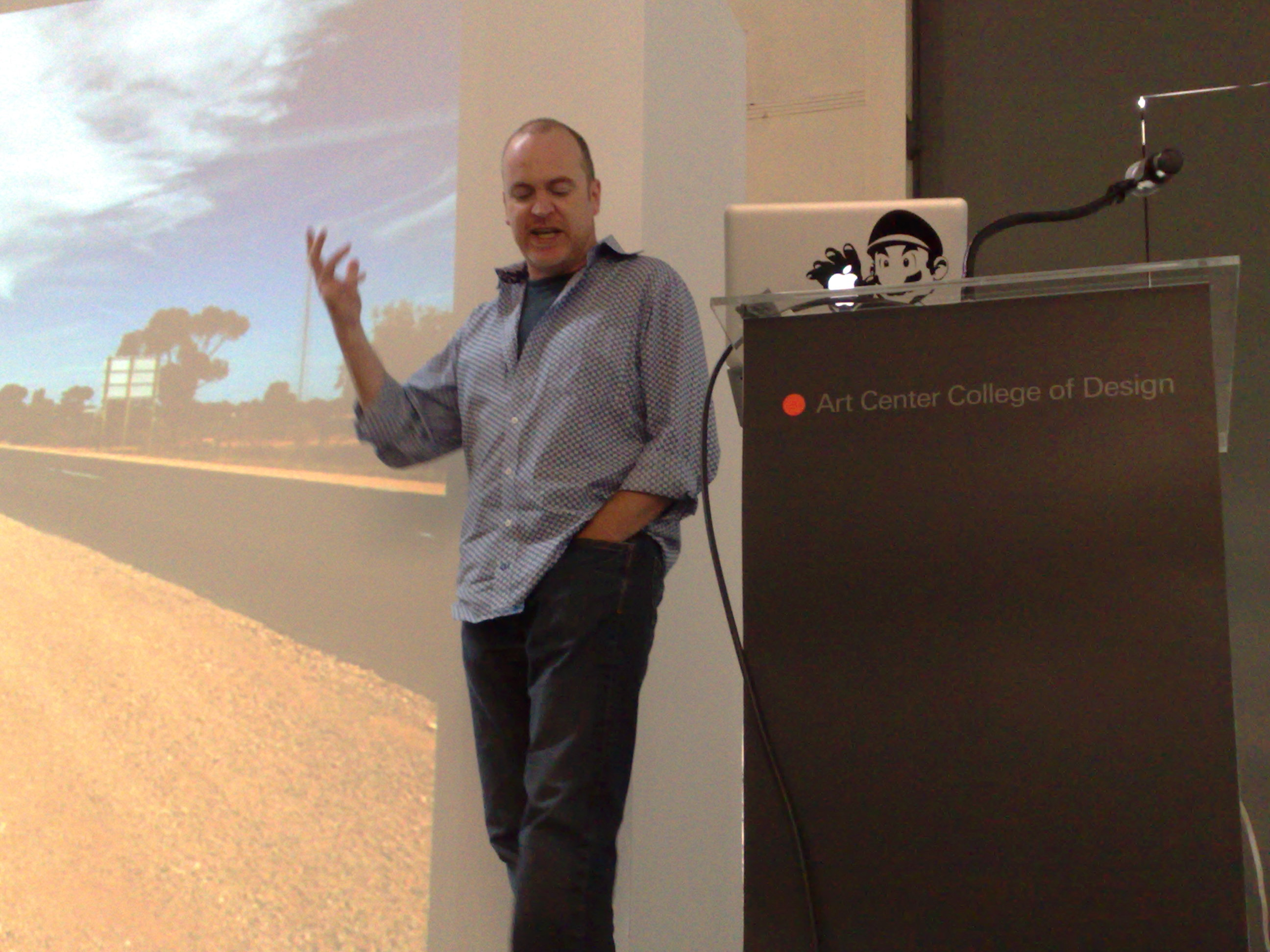
- Paul Dourish making a presentation at ArtCenter College of Design in Pasadena, CA.
- Born: 1966 (age 59–60); Glasgow, Scotland
- Education: PhD in Computer Science
- Occupation: Professor
- Employer: University of California, Irvine
- Known for: research at the intersection of computer science and social science
- Website: http://www.dourish.com/

Paul Dourish (born 1966) is a computer scientist best known for his work and research at the intersection of computer science and social science. Born in Scotland, he holds the Steckler Endowed Chair of Information and Computer Science at the University of California, Irvine, where he joined the faculty in 2000, and where he directs the Steckler Center for Responsible, Ethical, and Accessible Technology. He is a Fellow of the Royal Society of Edinburgh, the AAAS, the ACM, and the BCS, and is a two-time winner of the ACM CSCW "Lasting Impact" award, in 2016 and 2021. In 2025, he received ACM SIGCHI's award for Lifetime Achievement in Research.

Dourish has published three books and over 100 scientific articles, and holds 19 US patents.

== Life ==
Born and raised in Glasgow, Scotland, Dourish studied at St Aloysius' College. He received a B.Sc. in Artificial Intelligence and Computer Science from the University of Edinburgh in 1989, after which he moved to work at Rank Xerox EuroPARC (later the Xerox Research Center Europe) in Cambridge, UK. While working there, he completed a Ph.D. in Computer Science at University College London (UCL).

After completing his Ph.D., he moved to California, working for Apple Computer in Cupertino, California. He worked in research laboratories at Apple Computer until they closed 10 months later and then at Xerox's Palo Alto Research Center.

In 2000, Dourish moved to Southern California, when he joined the faculty at the University of California, Irvine. Since then, he has remained a full professor of Informatics. He has held visiting positions at Intel, Microsoft, Stanford University, MIT, the IT University of Copenhagen, and the University of Melbourne.

== Work ==
His published work is primarily in the areas of human-computer interaction, computer-supported cooperative work, and ubiquitous computing. He is the author of over 100 scientific publications, and holds 19 US patents. He is amongst the most prolific and widely cited scholars in human-computer interaction; Microsoft's academic search system lists him as the fourth most influential author in the area while Google Scholar calculates his h-index at over 80.

His research tends to draw both on technical and social domains, and speak to the relationship between them. His research topics have included the role of informal awareness in supporting coordination in collaborative systems, the relationship between 'place' and 'space' in information systems, and methodological questions about the use of ethnographic techniques in information systems design.

At UC Irvine, he is a professor of Informatics in the Donald Bren School of Information and Computer Sciences department, where he is a member of the Laboratory for Ubiquitous Computing and Interaction (LUCI), and in the interdisciplinary graduate program in Arts Computation Engineering. In addition to his appointment in Informatics, he has courtesy appointments in Computer Science and Anthropology. From 2004 to 2006, he was associate director at the California Institute for Telecommunications and Information Technology.

He co-directed the Center for Social Computing, one of Intel Corporation's US science and technology centers. Based at UC Irvine, this center involved academic partners from NYU, Cornell, Georgia Tech, and Indiana University.

At UC Irvine, Dourish is also a member of:

- The center for Cyber-Security and Privacy
- The Center for Organizational Research
- The Center for Unconventional Security Affairs
- The center for Biomedical Informatics
- The advisory board of the Center for Ethnography and the Institute for Money, Technology, and Financial Inclusion

Along with being a member of the aforementioned organizations, Dourish is a "co-conspirator" in the Laboratory for Ubiquitous Computing and Interaction, a faculty associate of the Center for Research on Information Technology and Organizations, and a co-coordinator of the People and Practices PAPR@UCI initiative.

== Awards ==
In 2008, he was elected to the CHI Academy in recognition of his contributions to Human-Computer Interaction. Dourish won the Diana Forsythe Prize in 2002, and the IBM Faculty Award in 2006 under the American Medical Informatics Association. He was also awarded the National Science Foundation CAREER Award in 2002. Dourish recently received a $201,000 grant to conduct research on people's online participation in social movements. Dourish recently received a $400,000 grant to research how the creative design process works when a team is split up through different cultures. Dourish also recently received a $247,000 grant to research how social media ties into death in real life.

In 2015 he was named a fellow of the Association for Computing Machinery "for contributions in social computing and human-computer interaction."

== Publications ==
Dourish has published three books. He published "Where the Action Is: The Foundations of Embodied Interaction" (MIT Press) in 2001. This book explores the relationship between phenomenological sociology and interaction design, particularly with reference to physically embodied computation and ubiquitous computing. He proposes Tangible computing and Social computing as two different aspects of the same program of investigation, named embodiment.

His second book, "Divining a Digital Future: Mess and Mythology in Ubiquitous Computing," written in collaboration with Genevieve Bell, is an exploration of the social and cultural aspects of ubiquitous computing, with a particular focus on the disciplinary and methodological issues that have shaped the ubiquitous computing research agenda. It was published by MIT Press in 2011.

His third book, "The Stuff of Bits: An Essay on the Materialities of Information," explores the "material arrangements” of various digital objects—that is, how information is represented and interpreted. Through a series of case studies, featuring digital artifacts and practices such as emulation, spreadsheets, databases, and computer networks, he connects the representation of information to broader issues of human experience, touching on “questions of power, policy, and polity in the realm of the digital." The book was published by MIT Press in 2017.

In addition to the three books, he has published conference proceedings, journal papers, conference papers, book chapters, technical reports, essay & position papers, editorial activities, and patents. Many of the patents that he holds involve document management.

== Teaching ==
Paul Dourish is a professor of informatics, computer science, and anthropology at UC Irvine. Some classes Dourish teaches are Ubiquitous Computing and Interaction, Social Analysis of Computerization, and Human-Computer Interaction. His Ubiquitous Computing and Interaction class focuses on how humans obtain information and interact using computers. Dourish's Socian Analysis of Computerization class focuses on how the internet, information, and technology affect our everyday lives. Finally, Dourish's Research in Computer-Human Interaction class examines the interactions between users and their devices and can be applied to either a person theoretically studying the field to write a dissertation or to a student wanting to apply these ideas to their own products.

== See also ==
- Lucy Suchman
- Terry Winograd
- Mark Weiser
- Bonnie Nardi
- Genevieve Bell
- Béatrice Galinon-Mélénec
- Critical technical practice

== Selected bibliography ==
- Dourish, P. 2001. Where the Action Is: The Foundations of Embodied Interaction. Cambridge: MIT Press.
- Dourish, P. 2004. What We Talk About When We Talk About Context. Personal and Ubiquitous Computing, 8(1), 19–30.
- Dourish, P. and Anderson, K. 2006. Collective Information Practice: Exploring Privacy and Security as Social and Cultural Phenomena. Human-Computer Interaction, 21(3), 319–342.
