= Interactive art =

Creative works that involve viewer input

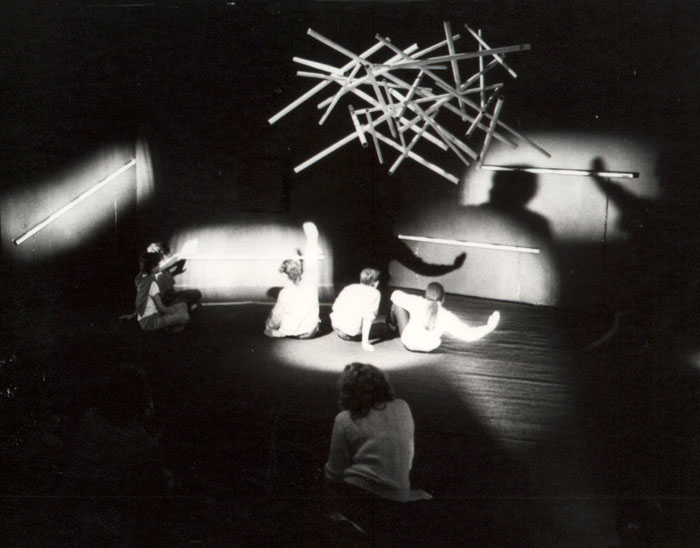
Music Room (1983), Jean-Robert Sedano and Solveig de Ory in Montpellier France

Interactive art is a form of art that involves the spectator in a way that allows the art to achieve its purpose. Some interactive art installations achieve this by letting the observer walk through, over or around them; others ask the artist or the spectators to become part of the artwork in some way.

Works of this kind of art frequently feature computers, interfaces and sometimes sensors to respond to motion, heat, meteorological changes or other types of input their makers have programmed the works to respond to. Most examples of virtual Internet art and electronic art are highly interactive. Sometimes, visitors are able to navigate through a hypertext environment; some works accept textual or visual input from outside; sometimes an audience can influence the course of a performance or can even participate in it. Some other interactive artworks are considered as immersive as the quality of interaction involve all the spectrum of surrounding stimuli. Virtual reality environments like works by Maurice Benayoun and Jeffrey Shaw are highly interactive as the work the spectators – Maurice Benayoun call them "visitors", Miroslaw Rogala calls them (v)users, Char Davies "immersants" – interact with take all their fields of perception.

Though some of the earliest examples of interactive art have been dated back to the 1920s, most digital art didn't make its official entry into the world of art until the late 1990s. Since this debut, multiple museums and venues have been increasingly accommodating digital and interactive art into their productions. This genre of art is continuing to grow and evolve through internet social sub-culture, as well as through large scale urban installations.

== Interactivity in art ==
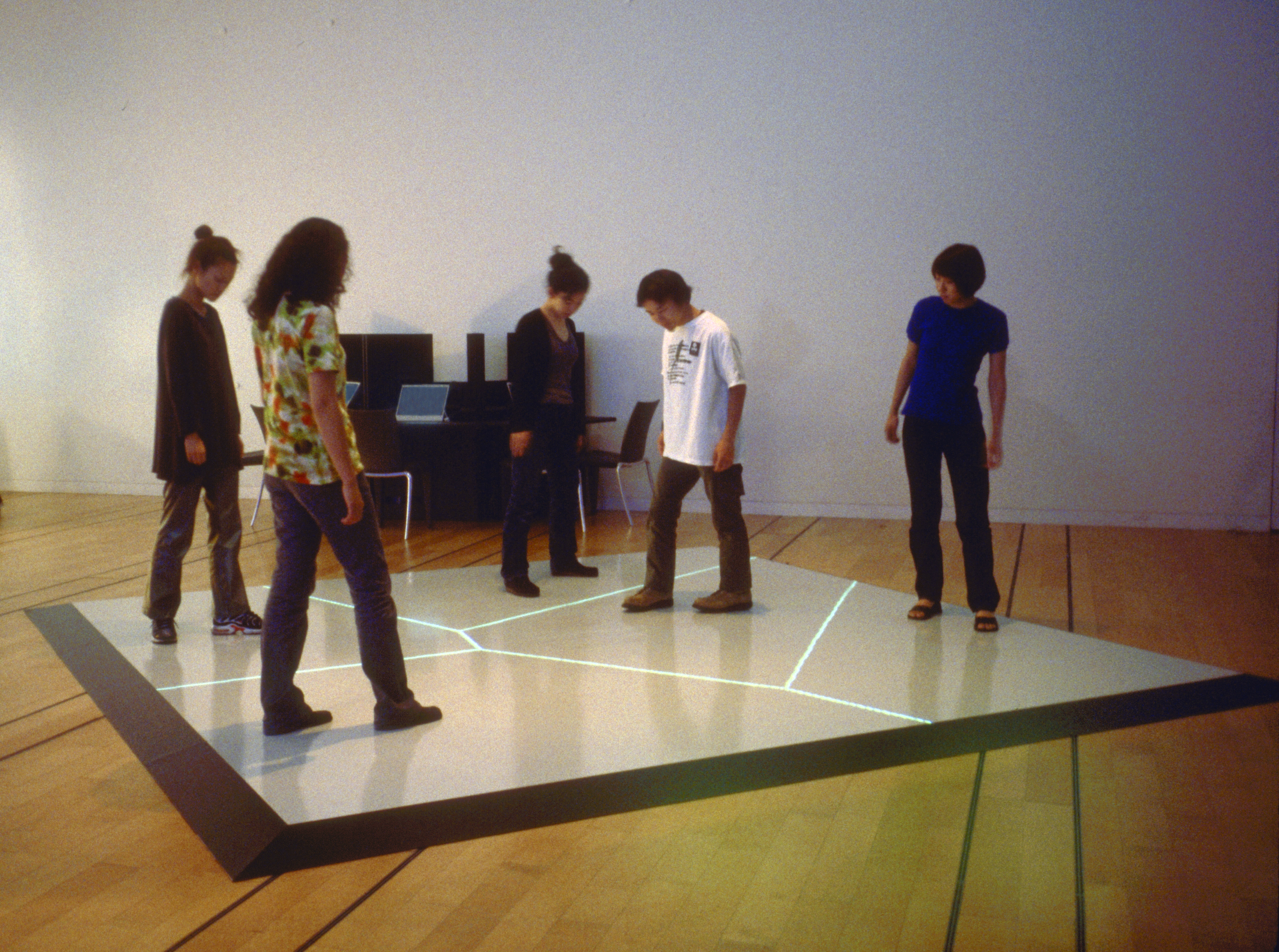
Boundary Functions (1998) interactive floor projection by Scott Snibbe at the NTT InterCommunication Center in Tokyo

Interactive art is a genre of art in which the viewers participate in some way by providing an input in order to determine the outcome. Unlike traditional art forms, wherein the interaction of the spectator is merely a mental event, interactivity allows for various types of navigation, assembly, and/or contribution to an artwork, which goes far beyond purely psychological activity. Interactivity as a medium produces meaning.

Interactive art installations are generally computer-based and frequently rely on sensors, which gauge things such as temperature, motion, proximity, and other meteorological phenomena that the maker has programmed in order to elicit responses based on participant action. In interactive artworks, both the audience and the machine work together in dialogue in order to produce a unique artwork for each audience to observe. However, not all observers visualize the same picture. Because it is interactive art, each observer makes their own interpretation of the artwork and it may be completely different from another observer's views.

Interactive art can be distinguished from generative art in that it constitutes a dialogue between the artwork and the participant; specifically, the participant has agency, or the ability, even in an unintentional manner, to act upon the artwork and is furthermore invited to do so within the context of the piece, i.e. the work affords the interaction. More often, we can consider that the work takes its visitor into account. In an increasing number of cases, an installation can be defined as a "responsive environment", especially those created by architects and designers. By contrast, Generative Art, which may be interactive, but not responsive per se, tends to be a monologue – the artwork may change or evolve in the presence of the viewer, but the viewer may not be invited to engage in the reaction but merely enjoy it.

== History ==
According to the new media artist and theorist Maurice Benayoun, the first piece of interactive art should be the work done by Parrhasius during his art contest with Zeuxis described by Pliny, in the fifth century B.C. when Zeuxis tried to unveil the painted curtain. The work takes its meaning from Zeuxis' gesture and wouldn't exist without it. Zeuxis, by its gesture, became part of Parrhasius' work. This shows that the specificity of interactive art resides often less in the use of computers than in the quality of proposed "situations" and the "Other's" involvement in the process of sensemaking. Nevertheless, computers and real time computing made the task easier and opened the field of virtuality – the potential emergence of unexpected (although possibly pre-written) futures – to contemporary arts.

Some of the earliest examples of interactive art were created as early as the 1920s. An example is Marcel Duchamp’s piece named Rotary Glass Plates. The artwork required the viewer to turn on the machine and stand at a distance of one meter in order to see an optical illusion.

The present idea of interactive art began to flourish more in the 1960s for partly political reasons. At the time, many people found it inappropriate for artists to carry the only creative power within their works. Those artists who held this view wanted to give the audience their own part of this creative process. An early example is found in the early 1960s "change-paintings" of Roy Ascott, about whom Frank Popper has written: "Ascott was among the first artists to launch an appeal for total spectator participation". Aside from the “political” view, it was also current wisdom that interaction and engagement had a positive part to play within the creative process.

In the 1970s, artists began to use new technology such as video and satellites to experiment with live performances and interactions through the direct broadcast of video and audio. At this time, Gordon Pask came up with the "Conversation theory". This theory emphasizes the dynamic exchange of information between participants in a system. As a two-way dialogue, this concept of a conversation between the user and the system has shaped artists' thinking about interactivity.

Interactive art became a large phenomenon due to the advent of computer-based interactivity in the 1990s. Along with this came a new kind of art-experience. Audience and machine were now able to more easily work together in dialogue in order to produce a unique artwork for each audience. In the late 1990s, museums and galleries began increasingly incorporating the art form in their shows, some even dedicating entire exhibitions to it. This continues today and is only expanding due to increased communications through digital media.

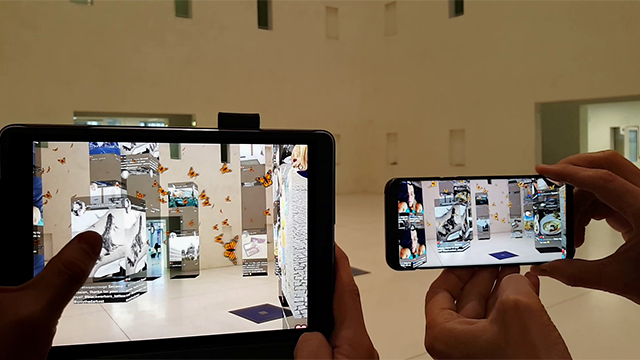
10.000 Moving Cities (2018), Marc Lee, Augmented Reality Multiplayer Game, Art Installation using smartphones

A hybrid discipline drawing on the combined interests of specific artists and architects has emerged. Disciplinary boundaries have blurred, and a number of architects and interactive designers have joined electronic artists in the creation of new, custom-designed interfaces and evolutions in techniques for obtaining user input (such as dog vision, alternative sensors and voice analysis); forms and tools for information display (such as video projection, lasers, robotic & mechatronic actuators and led lighting); modes for human-human and human-machine communication (through the Internet and other telecommunications networks); and to the development of social contexts for interactive systems (such as utilitarian tools, formal experiments, games and entertainment, social critique, and political liberation).

== Forms ==
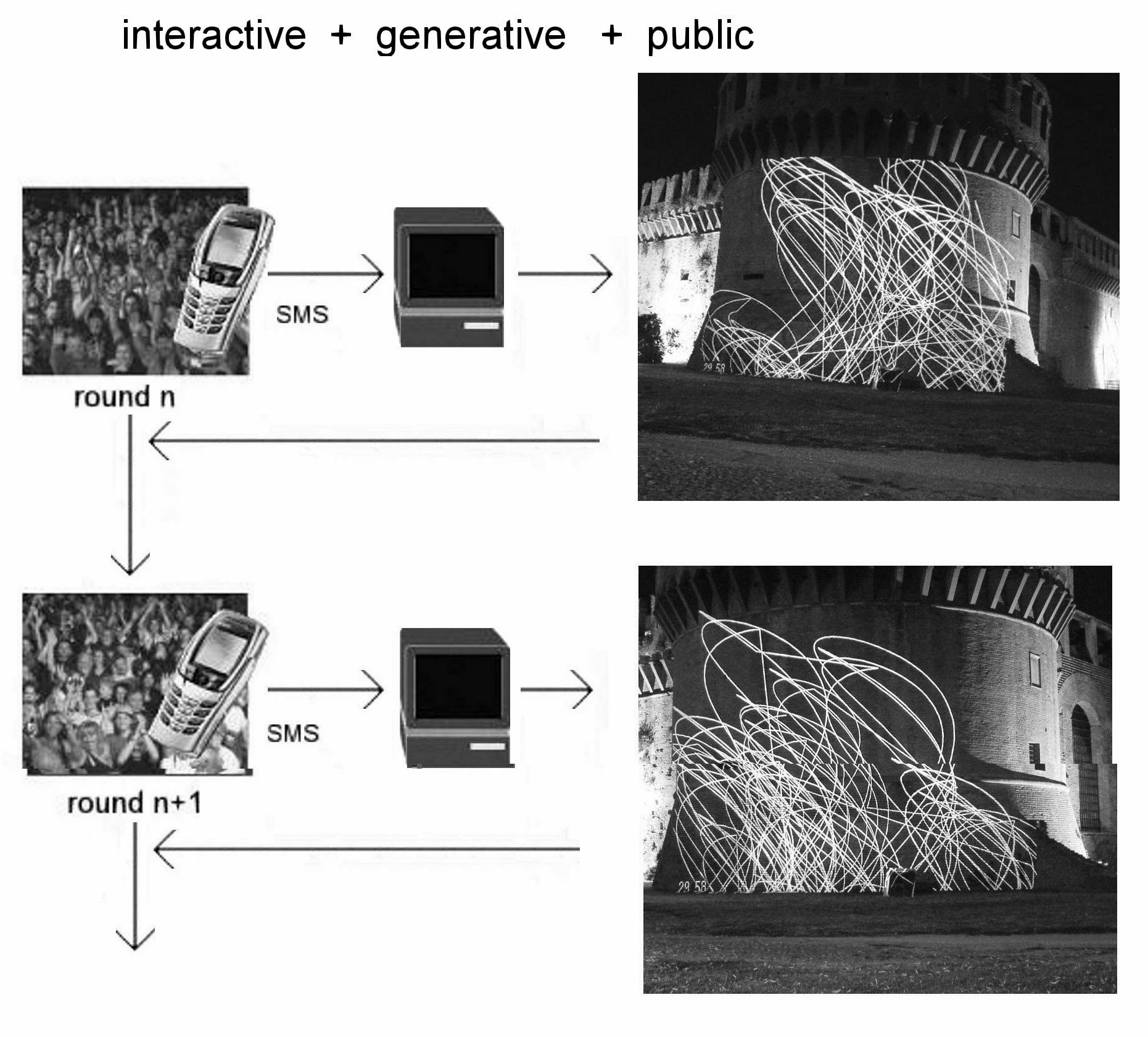
Maurizio Bolognini, Collective Intelligence Machines series (CIMs, from 2000): interactive installations using the mobile phone network and participation technologies taken from e-democracy.

There are many different forms of interactive art. Such forms range from interactive dance, music, and even drama. New technology, primarily computer systems and computer technology, have enabled a new class of interactive art. Examples of such interactive art are installation art, interactive architecture, interactive film, and interactive storytelling. Since there is a presumed participant or agent in interactivity, interactive art has a deep connection with performance art.

== Events and places ==
There are a number of globally significant festivals and exhibitions of interactive and media arts. Prix Ars Electronica is a major yearly competition and exhibition that gives awards to outstanding examples of (technology-driven) interactive art. Others include SIGGRAPH (the Association of Computing Machinery's Special Interest Group in Graphics), ISEA (the International Symposium on Electronic Art), DEAF (the Dutch Electronic Arts Festival), Transmediale Germany, Electronic Language International Festival Brazil, and AV Festival England.

CAiiA (the Centre for Advanced Inquiry in the Interactive Arts) was first established by Roy Ascott in 1994 at the University of Wales, Newport, and later in 2003 as the Planetary Collegium. It was the first doctoral and post doc research center to be established specifically for research in the interactive art field.

Interactive architecture has now been installed on and as part of building facades, in foyers, museums, and large scale public spaces, including airports, in a number of global cities. A number of leading museums, for example, the National Gallery, Tate, Victoria & Albert Museum, and Science Museum in London (to cite the leading UK museums active in this field) were early adopters in the field of interactive technologies, investing in educational resources, and more latterly, in the creative use of MP3 players for visitors. In 2004, the Victoria & Albert Museum commissioned curator and author Lucy Bullivant to write Responsive Environments (2006), the first such publication of its kind. Interactive designers are frequently commissioned for museum displays; a number specialize in wearable computing.

== Tools ==
- Wiring – first open-source electronics prototyping platform composed of a programming language, an integrated development environment (IDE), and a single-board microcontroller. Development began in 2003 by Hernando Barragán; popularized under the name Arduino
- Arduino – physical computing and electronics toolkit for interactive objects and installations
- I-CubeX – sensors, actuators and interfaces for interactive media
- Max/MSP/Jitter – programming language for interactive media
- Processing – programming language used for many interactive art projects, predecessor of Wiring
- OpenFrameworks – open source tool similar to Processing, used for many interactive projects
- Pure Data – open source programming language for interactive computer music and multimedia works
- TouchDesigner – a node based visual programming language for real time interactive multimedia content

== See also ==
- Art game
- Artmedia
- Burning Man
- Coachella Valley Music and Arts Festival
- Computer-generated art
- Contextual Theatre
- Electronic art
- Fax art
- Internet art
- Internet of Musical Things
- Kinetic sculpture
- Life Cube Project
- List of interactive artists
- New media art
- Performance art
- Relational art
- Robotic art
- Video game art
