= Critical technical practice =

Technology design

Critical technical practice is a critical theory based approach towards technological design proposed by Phil Agre where critical and cultural theories are brought to bear in the work of designers and engineers. One of the goals of critical technical practice is to increase awareness and critical reflection on the hidden assumptions, ideologies and values underlying technology design. It was developed by Agre in response to a perceived lack in Artificial intelligence research in the late 20th century, and continues to influence critical AI in 2021.

== See also ==
- Critical design
- Critical making
