= Sascha Pohflepp =

German artist (1978–2019)

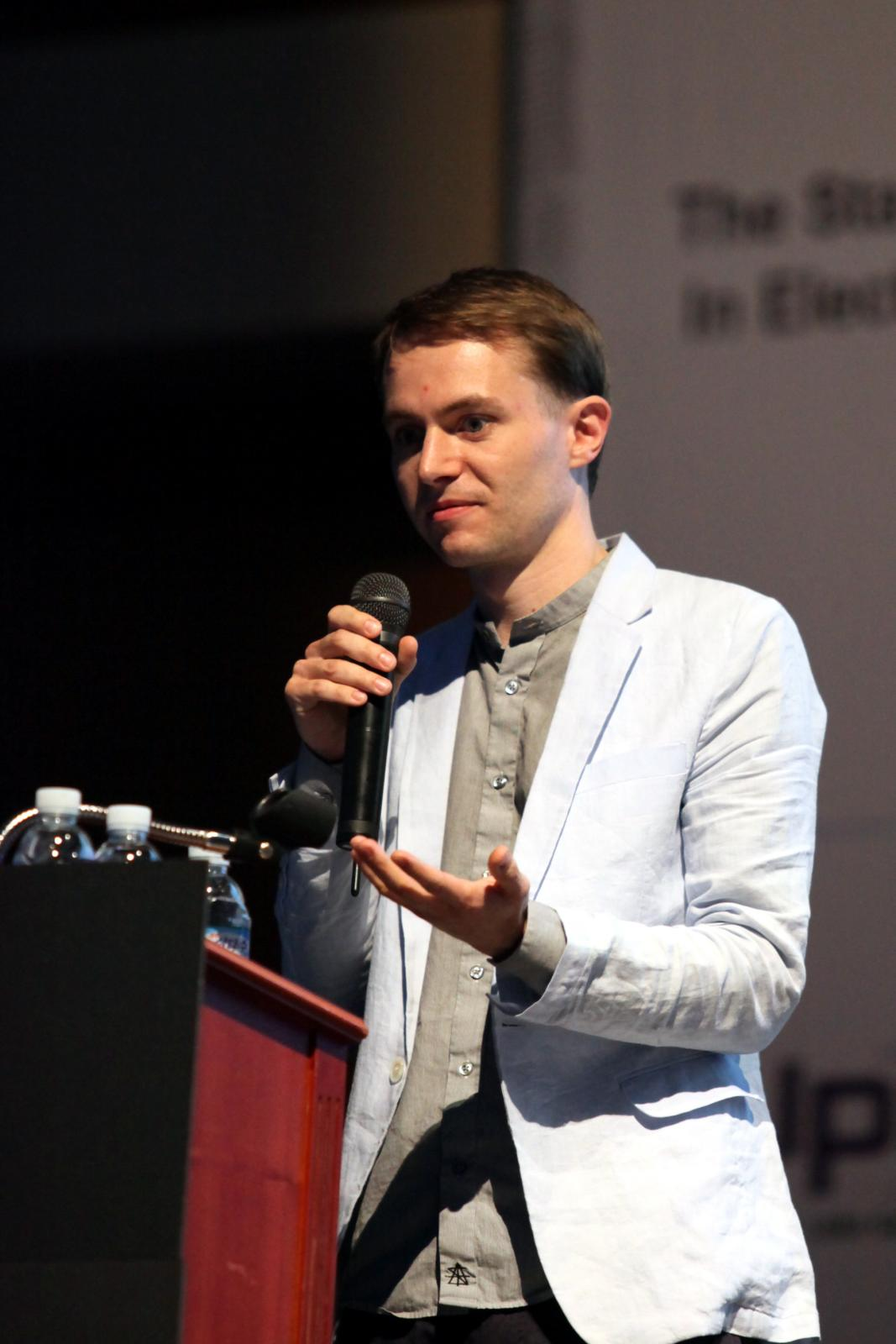
- Born: 30 January 1978; Cologne, Germany
- Died: 17 June 2019 (aged 41); Berlin, Germany
- Occupations: Artist, designer, writer

Sascha Pohflepp (30 January 1978 – 17 June 2019) was a German artist, designer, and writer whose work focused on the role of technology's influence on the environment, often collaborating with scientists and other artists to explore this theme.

== Biography ==
Born in Cologne, Pohflepp received his diploma at the Berlin University of the Arts in 2006 under media artist and designer Joachim Sauter, after studying during a guest term at the École Nationale Supérieure des Arts Décoratifs (ENSAD) in Paris with Brice Dellsperger. In 2009, he received is Masters of Arts in Design Interactions at the Royal College of Art in London, UK, where he worked with Anthony Dunne & Fiona Raby, Noam Toran.

In 2015, Pohflepp began his doctoral work with Benjamin H. Bratton in the PhD Program in Art History, Theory and Criticism with a concentration in Art Practice in the Department of Visual Arts at the University of California, San Diego. In Fall 2018, he advanced to candidacy with dissertation research on a new theory of "post-rational design", which interrelates discourses on the inhuman with the assemblage theory of Gilles Deleuze and Felix Guattari and a rethinking of the Anthropocene. This project was influenced by his participation in the graduate specialization track in anthropogeny at the Center for Academic Research & Training in Anthropogeny (CARTA) at the University of California, San Diego, where he was an Annette Merle-Smith Fellow and worked with the anthropologist Pascal Gagneux.

As an artist and designer, Pohflepp explored these ideas in such works as Growth Assembly (2009, with Alexandra Daisy Ginsberg, illustrations by Sion Ap Tomos); Spacewalk (2017); Deep Unlearning (I) (2018, with Chris Woebken); and Those Who (2019).

== Work ==
Pohflepp created work on the subjects of synthetic biology, geo-engineering, artificial intelligence, and space exploration, and been credited with extending the framework of Critical Design into the realm of elaborate Counterfactuals and other modes of narrative.

His work has been included in numerous international exhibitions, including Talk to Me: Design and Communication between People and Objects at the Museum of Modern Art in New York; Grow Your Own: Life After Nature at The Science Gallery in Dublin; Hyperlinks: Architecture and Design at The Art Institute of Chicago; and New Order at the Mediamatic Fabriek in Amsterdam. He received two Honorary Mentions from the VIDA Art and Artificial Life Awards and was an Eyebeam resident in 2013. In 2015, he was shortlisted for the Berlin Art Prize.

His essay "Living Machines," co-authored with Sheref S. Mansy, is part of the 2017 book, Synthetic Aesthetics: Investigating Synthetic Biology's Designs on Nature published with MIT Press.
