= Scott Smith =

Scott Smith may refer to:

== Entertainment ==
- Scott D. Smith (born 1953), American sound engineer
- Scott Michael Smith (born 1984), American record producer and audio engineer
- Scott Smith (author) (born 1965), American novelist and screenwriter
- Scott Smith (director), Canadian director
- Scott Smith (musician) (1955–2000), bassist of Loverboy

== Sports ==
- Scott Smith (runner) (born 1986), American long-distance runner
- Scott Smith (field hockey) (born 1972), Canadian field hockey player
- Scott Smith (ice hockey) (born 1966), Canadian ice hockey executive and administrator
- Scott Smith (footballer, born 1975), New Zealand soccer player
- Scott Smith (footballer, born 1992), Scottish footballer (Hibernian FC, Dumbarton FC)
- Scott Smith (footballer, born 1995), Scottish footballer (Dundee United FC)
- Scott Smith (footballer, born 2001), Welsh football midfielder
- Scott Smith (figure skater) (born 1981), American figure skater
- Scott Smith (fighter) (born 1979), American mixed martial artist
- Scott Smith (speedway rider), English speedway rider

== Politics ==
- Scott Smith (Arizona politician) (born 1956), mayor of Mesa, Arizona
- Scott Smith (Canadian politician) (born 1959), Canadian politician
- Scott Smith (Wyoming politician), member of the Wyoming State House

== Other ==
- Scott Smith (activist) (1948–1995), Harvey Milk's lover
- Scott Smith (futurist) (born 1967), futurist
- Scott L. Smith Jr. (born 1983), American author and attorney
