= Science fiction prototyping =

Science fiction prototyping (SFP) refers to the idea of using science fiction to describe and explore the implications of futuristic technologies and the social structures enabled by them. Similar terms are design fiction, speculative design, and critical design.

== History and progress ==
The idea was introduced by Brian David Johnson in 2010 who, at the time, was a futurist at Intel working on the challenge his company faced anticipating the market needs for integrated circuits at the end of their 7–10 years design and production cycle. The roots for Science Fiction Prototyping can be traced back to two papers, the first by Callaghan et-al “Pervasive Computing and Urban Development: Issues for the individual and Society”, presented at the 2004 United Nations World Urban Forum which used short stories as a means to convey potential future threats of technology to society and the second, by Egerton et-al "Using Multiple Personas In Service Robots To Improve Exploration Strategies When Mapping New Environments" describing multiple personas and irrational thinking for humanoid robots which inspired Brian David Johnson to write the first Science Fiction Prototype, Nebulous Mechanisms, which went on to become a series of stories that eventually morphed into Intel's 21st Century Robot project. Together Johnson, Callaghan and Egerton formed the Creative Science Foundation as a vehicle to promote and support the use of Science Fiction Prototyping and its derivatives. The first public Science Fiction Prototyping event was Creative Science 2010 (not to be confused with Creation Science), held in Kuala Lumpur, Malaysia on 19 July 2010. This event was also significant as it included the Science Fiction Prototype Tales From a Pod which became the first Science Fiction Prototype to be commercialised (by Immersive Displays Ltd, ImmersaVU). In 2011, a second Science Fiction Prototyping workshop was held in Nottingham (UK), Creative Science 2011, in which Intel made the first documentary about this methodology. Shortly afterwards the Creative Science Foundation was formed as an umbrella organisation to manage Science Fiction Prototyping activity, leading to a proliferation of events and publications; a more detailed account is provided on the Science Fiction Prototyping History web pages.

== Methodology ==
The core methodology is the use of creative arts as a means to introduce innovations into science, engineering, business and socio-political systems. It doesn't aim to forecast the future, rather it focuses on inventing or innovating the future by extrapolating forward trends from research or foresight activities (creating new concepts, schemes, services and products). The main (but not exclusive) methodology is the use of science-fiction stories, grounded in existing practice which are written for the explicit purpose of acting as prototypes for people to explore a wide variety of futures. These 'science fiction prototypes' (SFPs) can be created by scientists, engineers, business or socio-political professionals to stretch their work or, for example, by writers, film/stage directors, school children and members of the public to influence the work of professionals. In this way these stories act as a way of involving the widest section of the population to help set the research agenda. Johnson advocates the following five step process for writing Science Fiction Prototypes:

1. Pick Your Science and Build Your World
2. Identify the Scientific Inflection Point
3. Consider ramifications of the Science on People
4. Identify the Human Inflection Point
5. Reflect on what Did We Learn?

Full Science Fiction Prototypes are about 6–12 pages long, with a popular structure being: an introduction, background work, the fictional story (the bulk of the SFP), a short summary and a summary (reflection). Most often science fiction prototypes extrapolate current science forward and, therefore, include a set of references at the end. Such prototypes can take several days to write and for situations where ideas need to be generated faster (e.g. meetings), the concept of micro science fiction prototypes (μSFP) is used. Generally, μSFP are the size of a Twitter or Text message, being around 25–30 words (140–160 characters in standard English).

== Applications ==
Science fiction prototyping has a number of applications. The most obvious is for product innovation, in which the two earliest examples are Intel's 21st Century Robot (an open innovation project to develop a domestic robot) and Essex University's eDesk (a mixed-reality immersive education desk) both of which were introduced in the previous section. Beyond product innovation, science fiction prototyping finds itself being applied to many diverse areas. For example, at the University of Washington (USA) they have used it to facilitate broader contextual and societal thinking about computers, computer security risks, and security defense as part of an optional senior-level course in computer security. In 2014, these ideas were refined into a SFP methodology called Threatcasting with early adopters including the United States Air Force Academy, the Government of California, and the Army Cyber Institute at West Point Military Academy. An earlier variation called Futurcasting was used by government to provide a tool to influence the direction of society and politics. It did this by using stories about possible futures as a medium to engage the population in conversations about futures they would like to encourage or avoid. Science Fiction Prototyping is also being used in business environments. For example, in Canterbury Christ Church University (UK) Business School it is being used as a vehicle to introduce creative thinking in support of entrepreneurship courses. In the National Taiwan University (Taiwan), it is used to increase business school students' interests in science and technology for business innovation. Elsewhere the Business Schools of the universities of Leeds and Manchester (UK) are exploring its use in community development projects. Finally, it is being applied to Education. For example, in San-Diego State University (USA) Department of Learning Design and Technology they have explored it as a means for motivating pre-university students to take up STEM studies and careers. Further afield, in China, they have identified a novel use for the methodology to address the mandatory requirement for all science and engineering students to take a course in English language. In particular Shijiazhuang University (China) are exploring the potential for Science Fiction Prototyping to overcome the dullness that some science students experience in language learning by using it as an integrated platform for teaching Computer English, combining language and science learning. China is also concerned to improve the creative and innovation capabilities of their graduate which this approach supports.

== See also ==
- Creative problem-solving
- Creative writing
- Creativity
- Critical design
- Design fiction
- Divergent thinking
- Futures studies
- Category:Futures studies
- Futures techniques
- Lateral thinking
- Threatcasting
- Torrance Tests of Creative Thinking
