= Design fiction =

Design practice

Design fiction is a design practice aiming at exploring and criticising possible futures by creating speculative, and often provocative, scenarios narrated through designed artifacts. It is a way to facilitate and foster debates, as explained by futurist Scott Smith: "... design fiction as a communication and social object creates interactions and dialogues around futures that were missing before. It helps make it real enough for people that you can have a meaningful conversation with".

By inspiring new imaginaries about the future, Design Fiction moves forward innovation perspectives, as conveyed by author Bruce Sterling's own definition: "Design Fiction is the deliberate use of diegetic prototypes to suspend disbelief about change".

Reflecting the diversity of media used to create design fictions and the breadth of concepts that are prototyped in the associated fictional worlds, researchers Joseph Lindley and Paul Coulton propose that design fiction be defined as: "(1) something that creates a story world, (2) has something being prototyped within that story world, (3) does so in order to create a discursive space", where 'something' may mean 'anything'. Examples of the media used to create design fiction storyworlds include physical prototypes, prototypes of user manuals, digital applications, videos, short stories, comics, fictional crowdfunding videos, fictional documentaries, catalogues or newspapers and pastiches of academic papers and abstracts.

== History ==
Design fiction is part of the speculative design discipline, itself a relative of critical design. Although the term design fiction was coined by Bruce Sterling in 2005, where he says it is similar to science fiction but "makes more sense on the page", it was Julian Bleecker's 2009 essay that firmly established the idea. Bleecker brought together Sterling's original idea and combined it with David A. Kirby's notion of the diegetic prototype and a paper written by influential researchers Paul Dourish and Genevieve Bell which argued reading science fiction alongside Ubiquitous Computing research would shed further light on both areas. Since Bleecker's essay was published design fiction has become increasingly popular as demonstrated by the adoption of design fiction in a wide variety of academic research.

== Characteristics ==
Although design fiction shows a lot of overlaps with other Discursive Design practices such as critical design, Adversarial Design, Interrogative Design, Design for Debate, reflective design, and contestational design, it is possible to draw some of its special features.

Design fiction draws its inspiration from weak signals of our everyday lives, such as innovations in new technologies or new cultural trends, and use extrapolation to build disruptive visions of society. Through challenging the status quo, this practice aims at making ourselves question our current uses, norms, ethics or values, whether leading innovation, or consuming it at the other end of the line.

Design fictions tend to stand aside from manichaean utopian/dystopian depictions, and rather dig into more ambiguous grey areas of the explored subjects. As explained by Fabien Girardin, co-founder of The Near Future Laboratory: "Design Fiction doesn't so much 'predict' the future. It is a way to consider the future differently; a way to tell stories about alternatives and unexpected trajectories; a way to discuss a different kind of future than the typical bifurcation into utopian and dystopian".

Design fictions focus on the everyday, exploring and questioning interactions between people or HCI, habits, social behaviors, casual failures or rituals. Fabien Girardin on this point: "To contrast with other similar design approaches, we think Design Fiction is a bit different from critical design, which is a bit more abstract and theoretical compared to our own interest in design happening outside of galleries or museums. Design Fiction is about exploring a future mundane".

Another approach to design fiction is through live action role-playing games (larps). Malthe Stavning Erslev argues that the research larp Civilisation's Waiting Room, which explores a future society run by an AI, is a form of design fiction using what he calls a mimetic method that is "making the technology appear" in "deeply embodied, ephemeral encounters of enactment".

In recent pop culture, design fiction might be bonded to the Black Mirror anticipation series, each episode portraying a disturbing alternative present or near future where characters have to deal with the unexpected consequences of emerging technologies.

== Methodology and process ==
Design fiction is an open and evolving practice, demonstrating a variety of approaches from designers and studios. However it is possible to draw some common lines:

- "What if?" questions

Design fictions often rely on a question: "What if?", creating a provocative framework for speculation from the start. This questioning format stimulates the exploration of tensions and sticking points, leading to the construction of the new fictional universe, in an alternative present or near future, which includes a new set of morals and values: "The New Normal".

- Diegetic prototypes

The speculative scenario and the fictional world in which it takes place are made tangible thanks to design tools and methods, to conceive what David A. Kirby was the first to call "diegetic prototypes". The term diegetic stands for their narrative attribute, made to be self-explanatory of the world they come from. At the same time, they purposely leave narrative spaces for the viewer's imagination to fill in: they "tell worlds rather than stories". As explained by Julian Bleecker: "Design fiction objects are totems through which a larger story can be told, or imagined or expressed. They are like artifacts from someplace else, telling stories about other worlds".

These prototypes are effective entry points into complex topics subject to socio-technological controversies such as digital technologies, Internet of things, ubiquitous computing, biotechnology, synthetic biology, transhumanism, artificial intelligence, data or algorithms. They "help make things visceral and real enough to jump to discussions and get to decisions".

- Discussion and debate generation

Design fictions are meant to be displayed in order to create a space for discussion and debate. They can be exposed in various contexts depending on the targeted audiences: online – video platforms, social media, dedicated websites,... – or offline – galleries or museums, convenient stores, forums, ... – unveiling or not their fictional nature. In 2013, the project 99¢ FUTURES driven by the Extrapolation Factory studio showed that provoked discussions and debates could happen successfully in non-institutional places, such as a convenient store: they shelved artefacts – previously imagined and conceived during a workshop - among "real" current consumption objects. Customers passing by started to discuss about these pieces of futures, even purchasing the one they liked the most for a few dollars.

== Application scope ==
- Public policy-making

Design Fiction is a helpful tool used to discuss and move forward public policy-making processes. In 2015, ProtoPolicy, a co-design project led by the Design Friction studio, All-Party Parliamentary Design and Innovation Group (APDIG) and Age UK aimed at building a shared understanding of the constraints and opportunities of political issues around Ageing in Place and loneliness through design fictions. A series of creative workshops involving older people communities led to the conception of "Soulaje", a provocative self-administered euthanasia wearable designed to start discussion around the taboo issues of death and freedom of choice. A second scenario staged "The Smart Home Therapist", a new kind of therapist who, through human psychology and artificial intelligence expertise, facilitates and improves older people's relationship with their smart homes and eases their access to personalized domestic products and services.

- Innovative companies

Design fiction can be a powerful tool for companies showing prospective approaches or interests within changing or emerging industries. It can be used to help inspiring new imaginaries about the future, collecting insights and qualitative data that will help to formulate strategic directions and decisions, anticipating risks, social and cultural obstacles, enabling discussion between stakeholders, involving internal teams and external audiences in future orientations, bringing out unexpected feedbacks, frictions, misuses, misappropriations or reappropriations of new technologies and highlight their multiple impacts on potential users and more broadly speaking on the society.

The Near Future Laboratory on its approach of design fiction towards companies: "Design Fiction is one approach among others, but its contribution focus on the near future and is tangible. For instance, instead of participating to workshops of multidisciplinary experts with a powerpoint filled with ideas for a technology, we propose to create the user manual for the envisioned product or produce a video that showcases how an employee appropriates the technologies with its features and limitations. These artifacts are meant to materialize changes, opportunities and implication in the use of technologies. They particularly point out details in situations of use with the objective to avoid a "general discussion". ... For our clients a successful Design Fiction means that they can feel, touch and understand near future opportunities and with convincing material of potential changes of their customers, markets, technologies, or competition."

- General public

Design fiction gets closer to activism when it comes to raising the awareness of the general public on emerging social, legal, political or economic issues. Oniria is a project developed by A Parede studio in 2016 in reaction to the Statute of the Unborn, a Brazilian law project settling the beginning of life at the stage of egg fertilisation, therefore prohibiting the Morning-After Pill in a country where abortion is already illegal under most circumstances. As a critique, designers imagined a scenario in which a company launches a contraceptive technology in line with this new measure. People were invited to share their own visions through various social media platforms on how their life would be affected and how they would bond to this new device in their everyday life.

== Publications ==
- The Manual of Design Fiction by Julian Bleecker, Nick Foster, Fabien Girardin, and Nicolas Nova, 2022
- Speculative Everything: Design, Fiction and Social Dreaming by Dunne and Raby, MIT Press, 2013
- 2050: "Designing our Tomorrow", Architectural Design, Volume 85, Issue 4, July/August 2015. Edited by Chris Luebkeman with contributions from Tim Maughan, Dan Hill, Liam Young, Mitchell Joachim, et al.
- Ecotopia 2121: Visions of Our Future Green Utopia--in 100 Cities, written and illustrated by Alan Marshall, ISBN 978-1-62872-600-8, an outcome of the Ecotopia 2121 Project
- "Design Fiction", A short essay on design, science fact and fiction by Julian Bleecker, 2009
- Little Book of Design Fiction for the Internet of Things by Paul Coulton, Joe lindley, and Rachel Cooper, 2018

== See also ==
- Critical design
- Critical making
- Dystopia
- Scenario-based design
- Science fiction prototyping
- Speculative design
- Superfiction
- Utopia
