= Big Huggin' =

- Developer: Critical Gameplay
- Publisher: Critical Gameplay
- Designer: Lindsay Grace
- Composer: Lindsay Grace
- Platform: Windows
- Release: 2011
- Genre: Affective videogames
- Mode: Single-player

Big Huggin' is an affective video game developed by Critical Gameplay in 2013. It was created by Lindsay Grace. It has been shown in exhibits in the United States, Mexico, France, and Brazil.

== Gameplay ==
Its design is based on Critical Design, and in contrast to classic video games, it is not controlled by mouse or keyboard, but rather the controls of the game are based on hugs made to a 30-inch custom teddy bear.

== Development ==
Big Huggin' was created in 2012 by Lindsay Grace, and its promotion continue in different cities and countries.

=== Kickstarter campaign ===
Lindsay Grace launched a Kickstarter campaign on January 15, 2013, in order to raise US$2,500 for the continued promotion and exhibition of the game. A subsequent goal was the subsidized release of the game for children in places where giving hugs is even more valuable than usual. The campaign helped fund the production of bears and the game. The campaign was founded on February 14, 2013 and raised US$3,080.

== Gameplay ==
Player input is collected by hugging a 30-inch custom teddy bear rather than a video game controller with buttons.

== See also ==
- Affection
- Positive affectivity
