= Speculative design =

Design practice critically concerned with future designs

Speculative design is a design practice concerned with future design proposals of a critical nature. The term was popularised by Anthony Dunne and Fiona Raby as a subsidiary of critical design. The aim is not to present commercially-driven design proposals but to design proposals that identify and debate crucial issues that might happen in the future. Speculative design is concerned with future consequences and implications of the relationship between science, technology, and humans. It problematizes this relation by proposing provocative future design scenarios where technology and design implications are accentuated. These design proposals are meant to trigger debates about the future rather than marketing products.

== Definition ==
Dunne and Raby, the researchers who coined the term speculative design, describe it as:

“an activity where conjecture is as good as knowledge, where futuristic and alternative scenarios convey ideas, and where the goal is to emphasize implications of “mindless” decisions for mankind.”

— Anthony Dunne and Fiona Raby

Speculative design is used to challenge preconceptions, raise questions and to provoke debate. It opens the door for designers to imagine possible futures.

James Auger claims speculative design "combines informed, hypothetical extrapolations of an emerging technology’s development with a deep consideration of the cultural landscape into which it might be deployed, to speculate on future products, systems and services”.

Speculative designers develop alternative presents to ask why things are the way they are so that they can project the future. James Auger explains that these alternative presents can make radical interventions to the current practices and evolving technologies by applying different ideologies and practices.

Speculative design emphasizes the “philosophical inquiry into technological application”; it tends to take the discussion on technology beyond the experts to a broad population of the audience. The resulting artifacts often appear subversive and irreverent in nature; they look different to the public, and this is the key behind triggering discussions and stimulating questions.

Speculative design can be distinguished from design that operates within commercial borders where the aim of designing is profitability. Speculative design is an exploratory design genre and a Research through Design (RtD) approach.

== Origins and early attempts ==
Anti-design and Italian radical design could be considered as ancestors of speculative design. However, the format of speculative design as we know it today is derived from the critical design practice. Both are connected and use similar approaches. Dunne and Raby described critical design as a practice that “uses speculative design proposals to challenge narrow assumptions, preconceptions, and givens about the role products play in everyday life”. Critical design is a form of design that uses design tools and processes not to solve a problem but to rethink the borders and parameters of a problem from a critical point of view Dunne and Raby explained the term further in their book ‘Design Noir: The Secret Life of Electronic Objects,’ as “Instead of thinking about appearance, user-friendliness or corporate identity, industrial designers could develop design proposals that challenge conventional values”.

The relationship between speculative design and critical design can be seen from Matt Malpass identification of the current contemporary design practices into three classifications; the first is associative design, the second is speculative design, and the third is critical design. Speculative design is a form of critical design that is concerned with future proposals. It examines future scenarios to ask the question of “what if?”.

Some attempts of the Italian radical design can be considered as speculative design. For instance, Ettore Sottsass worked on “The planet as a festival” in 1973. Speculative design is inspired by the attitude and position of the Italian radical design, yet does not necessarily imitate its format and motivations.

== Motivation ==
Speculative design aims to defy capitalist-driven design directions and showcase their negative impacts on design practice. Dunne and Raby note that hyper-commercialization of design during the 1980s drove this practice. Designers struggled to find a social model to align with outside of the capitalist economy. However, after the financial crash of 2008, the interest in finding other alternatives to the current design models was triggered. In this sense, the role of design is to be a catalyst in producing alternative visions rather than being the source of vision itself.

Speculative designers' motivation is to take a position or an attitude towards the current design practice and propose alternatives. Designers might have different points of view about how they would present a design idea or focal issue. Bruce and Stephanie Tharp identify the different positions designers could take towards their projects; these could be: declarative, suggestive, inquisitive, facilitative, and disruptive.

Auger extends this discussion on explaining what speculative design should do by mentioning aspects for it:

1. " Arrange emerging (not yet available) technological ‘elements’ to hypothesise future products and artefacts, or
2. apply alternative plans, motivations, or ideologies to those currently driving technological development in order to facilitate new arrangements of existing elements, and
3. develop new perspectives on big systems."

Aiming at:

1. " Asking ‘what is a better future (or present)?’
2. Generating a better understanding of the potential implications of a specific (disruptive) technology in various contexts and on multiple scales – with a particular focus on everyday life.
3. Moving design ‘upstream’ – to not simply package technology at the end of the technological journey but to impact and influence that journey from its genesis."

== In theory ==
Speculative design relies on speculation and proposition; its value comes from speculating about future scenarios where design is used in a particular context to showcase a notion or an idea of debate. The most significant aim of speculative design is to enact change rather than conforming to the status quo. According to Johannessen, Keitsch and Pettersen the change aspects can be segmented into three elements:

- Political and social change,
- Product value and user experience change
- Aesthetics

Speculative designers do not suggest what a preferable future is; they let society decide what is a preferable future for them, whereas affirmative design, government, and industries actually decide on their preferable future and create it. It encourages the audience to suggest their preferable future that has no direct relevance with today’s perspective of how the future should be and this raises the awareness for society on how they could influence their choices for the future; the logic of the ‘laws’ of future implies that if we strive for something, we can eventually turn it into reality, even if it seems incredible now.

Speculative design triggers the debate about the actions we take today (in the present) that build future events. It encourages the users to be the change of today. It questions technology at early stages; it is concerned with the domestication of technology and upstream engagement. It poses societal and ethical implications to interrogate them. It questions the role of industrial and product design in delivering new science and technology. Speculative design as a subsidiary of critical design is built on the fundamentals Frankfurt school of criticism. Therefore, critical thinking is an essential aspect of speculative design. Critiquing norms, values and why we design is what motivates speculative designers.

Design is a future-oriented practice by nature. However, the issue lies in the fact that vast majority of designers tend to abide by technological advancements without interrogating them or questioning the implications of such technology. An example of this is the wide adoption of social media and how this affected society (for example, the social dilemma).

Designers, in this case, do not attempt to change the future, but rather they tend to adapt their design towards what they can see as a probable future. In this sense, they see it as something that they cannot change. In this context, speculative design aims to influence change by raising questions and provoking debates by implementing designed objects. Speculative design uses objects or prototypes that do imply implicit meanings about complex social and technological issues.

To highlight the differences between affirmative design and speculative design, Dunne and Raby introduced the A/B Manifesto to contrast their meanings and to highlight what does it mean to be critical or speculative in design.

A/B Manifesto
| A | B |
|---|---|
| Affirmative | Critical |
| Problem solving | Problem finding |
| Provides answers | Asks questions |
| Design for production | Design for debate |
| Design as solution | Design as medium |
| In the service of industry | In the service of society |
| Fictional functions | Functional fictions |
| For how the world is | For how the world could be |
| Change the world to suit us | Change us to suit the world |
| Science fiction | Social fiction |
| Futures | Parallel worlds |
| The “real” real | The “unreal” real |
| Narratives of production | Narratives of consumption |
| Applications | Implications |
| Fun | Humor |
| Innovation | Provocation |
| Concept design | Conceptual design |
| Consumer | Citizen |
| Makes us buy | Makes us think |
| Ergonomics | Rhetoric |
| User-friendliness | Ethics |
| Process | Authorship |

== In practice ==
Speculative design can be seen as an attitude, stance, or position instead of a process or methodology.

Tactics, methods, and strategies for speculative design have wide variation. It depends on the designer’s intention and the careful management of the outcome of the design project.

Speculative design needs a “perceptual bridge” between what the audience identifies as their reality and the fictional elements in the speculative concept.

Tactics and strategies of speculative design:

- Reductio Ad Absurdum
- Counterfactuals
- Ambiguity
- Satire

and the outcome of speculative design can be a project in the form of:

- Para-functional prototypes
- Post-optimal prototypes

== Adjacent practices ==
Speculative design has many adjacent practices including critical design, discursive design, and design fiction. They share similar motivations but different purposes or target areas.

== Criticism ==
The most significant criticism for critical and speculative design would be based on the understanding that design is not functional or useful, so it cannot be considered as design. The grounds for criticism are built on the basic understanding of design as a problem-solving activity. In contrast, speculative design is concerned with problem finding. It does not create functional objects at the end but rather problematizes an issue or social implication.

Other criticism directed towards speculative design points out that what some would present as dystopian futures resemble the actual conditions of people groups foreign to the designers. Critics such as Luiza Prado de O. Martins consider the practice a niche that is only presented in highly intellectual venues such as MOMA and V&A Museum.

Another criticism for speculative design is dissemination and reflection. The format and venues of presenting speculative design proposals do not imply a methodological approach for engaging with the audience and broader society. This is what Bruce and Stephanie Tharp call "a message in a bottle," a comparison that argues against some designs' inability to exceed their boundaries.

== See also ==
- Critical design
- Critical making
- Design fiction
- Dunne & Raby
