= David Kirby =

David Kirby may refer to:

- David Kirby (journalist) (1960–2023), American journalist
- David Kirby (poet) (born 1944), American poet and academic
- David Kirby (judge) (born 1943), Australian lawyer
- David Kirby (historian) (born 1942), former professor at the School of Slavonic and East European Studies, University of London
- David Kirby (business professor) (born 1945), professor of business administration at British University in Egypt
- David Kirby (activist) (1957–1990), AIDS activist and the subject of a photograph taken at his deathbed
- David Kirby (cricketer) (1939–2021), English cricketer
- David A. Kirby (born 1968), professor of science communication studies at the University of Manchester
- David Peter Kirby (born 1936), historian of Anglo-Saxon England
