= David A. Kirby =

American science communicator

David Allen Kirby
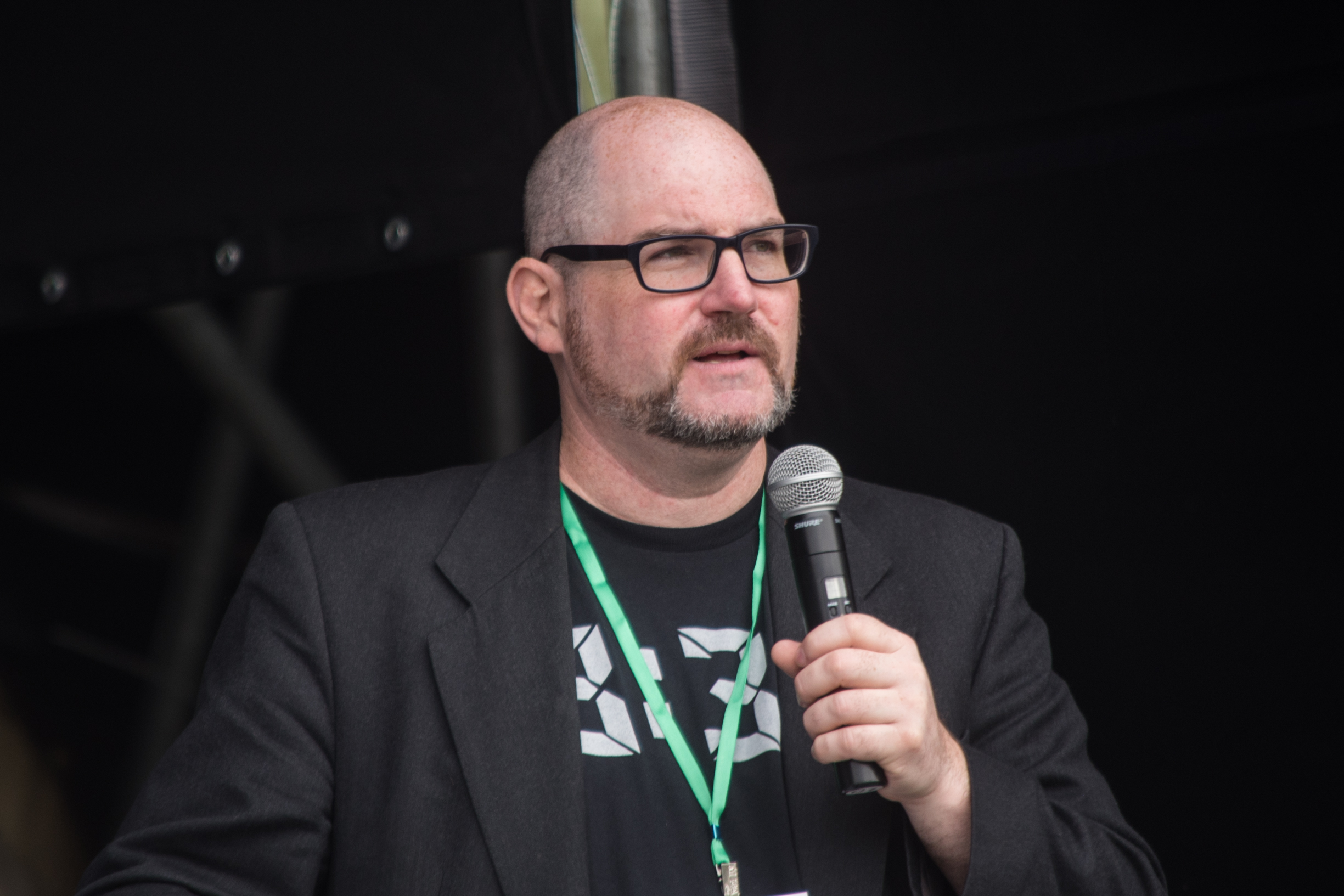
- David A. Kirby presenting as co-headliner at the Geek Picnic in 2017, St. Petersburg, Russia.
- Born: 30 November 1968 (age 57)
- Occupations: Professor of Science Communication Studies, University of Manchester
- Awards: Investigator Award in the Medical Humanities from the Wellcome Trust (2013)

Academic background
- Education: University of Maryland-College Park
- Thesis: (1996)

Academic work
- Discipline: Science communication studies
- Notable works: Lab Coats in Hollywood: Science, Scientists and Cinema

David Allen Kirby (born 30 November 1968) is an American professor of science communication studies at California Polytechnic State University in San Luis Obispo. He researches, writes about, and teaches science communication and the history of science. He is best known for his work showing how fictional narratives can be used in the process of design and for his studies on the use of scientists as consultants for Hollywood film productions.

== Academic history ==
Kirby received his BS in Ecology, Ethology, and Evolution from the University of Illinois-Champaign/Urbana in 1990. He then received a PhD in Zoology from the University of Maryland-College Park in 1996. He was an Assistant Professor in the Biology Department of American University until 2001 where he taught molecular biology and evolution. He then received a National Science Foundation postdoctoral fellowship that allowed him to re-train in the fields of science communication and science & technology studies (STS) in Cornell University's Department of Science and Technology Studies. In 2004 he took up a position at the University of Manchester where he was Professor of Science Communication Studies in the Centre for the History of Science, Technology and Medicine. Currently, he is Professor and Chair of the Department of Interdisciplinary Studies in the Liberal Arts and Director of the Program in Science, Technology & Society at Cal Poly University in San Luis Obispo. A position he started in 2019.

== Academic work ==
Kirby's scientific research was in the field of population genetics where he used techniques from molecular biology to explore the evolution of genetic diversity in the fruit fly Drosophila melanogaster. His work contributed to our understanding of the role that genetic interactions play in evolution, a phenomenon known as epistasis.

Kirby's concept of the diegetic prototype refers to the ways that fictional depictions can stimulate public discussions about social, cultural, and ethical implications of emerging technologies. The concept of the diegetic prototype provided one of the foundations for the creative approach to technological development known as design fiction. According to Julian Bleecker, the creator of the term design fiction, the "diegetic prototype provides a principle for understanding the ways in which science fact and science fiction always need each other to survive. Kirby's primary impact on the field of science communication has been to bring the study of science in entertainment media into the mainstream of science communication studies. His work showed the importance of movies, television and other entertainment media for communicating science and it moved the field beyond its narrow focus on news media. He is director of the Science and Entertainment Lab. His 2011 book Lab Coats in Hollywood: Science, Scientists and Cinema was the first academic study of the interactions between the scientific community and the entertainment industry. The work focused on the contributions made by scientists who serve as consultants for Hollywood film productions and the subsequent impact these movies had on real world science and technology.

The book transcended traditional academic boundaries with reviews not only in key journals for the history of science, science & technology studies, and science communication but also reviews in the prominent scientific journals Science and Nature as well as journals in the fields of physics, chemistry, psychiatry, literary studies, film studies, and science education. The book was also named one of Physics World magazine's top 10 best popular-physics books of 2011. Kirby's work also provided an academic foundation for the development of initiatives to enhance the use of science in entertainment products including the National Academy of Sciences' Science and Entertainment Exchange and the German program MINTEEE.

In 2013 Kirby received an Investigator Award in the Medical Humanities from the Wellcome Trust for a project entitled "Playing God: Exploring the interactions among the biosciences, religion and entertainment media." The goal of the project is to investigate the ways that entertainment professionals use science in entertainment medi, such as TV episodes, movies and computer games, and how religious communities respond to these entertainment texts. He is examining the period from 1930–1968 when religiously based movie censorship groups like the Hays Office and the Legion of Decency modified movie narratives in order to tell what they considered to be more appropriate stories about science in movies.

Kirby's early work after his transition into science communication and STS primarily addressed the relationship between cinema, genetics and biotechnology. He was the first scholar to analyse the 1997 film GATTACA. He shows the ways in which the film serves as a bioethics text that warns society about embracing the notion that an individual's personality and capabilities are defined entirely by their genes, an ideology known as genetic determinism. His other work on the topic of cinema, genetics and biotechnology shows how most movies simultaneously embrace genetic determinism while also strongly opposing any scientific attempts to change our genes.

== Science popularization ==
Kirby has given numerous public lectures on his research including co-headliner for the 2017 Geek Picnic in St. Petersburg, Russia, and co-headliner for the 2014 Imagine Film Festival.

== Selected publications ==
- Kirby, D.A. (2019) "Darwin on the Cutting Room Floor: Evolution, Religion and Film Censorship, " Osiris, 34: 55-80.
- Kirby, D.A. (2018) "Movie Censorship, Science Communication and the Deficit Model," Science in Context, 31(1): 85-106.
- Kirby, D.A. (2017) "Regulating Cinematic Stories About Reproduction: Pregnancy, Childbirth, Abortion and Movie Censorship in the US, 1930–1958," British Journal for the History of Science, 50(3): 451-472.
- Kirby, D.A. (2013) "Forensic Fictions: Storytelling, Television Production, and Forensic Science," Studies in History and Philosophy of Science, 44(1): 92–102.
- Kirby, D.A. (2011), Lab Coats in Hollywood: Science, Scientists, and Cinema, Cambridge, MA: MIT Press, ISBN 9780262518703.
- Kirby, D.A. (2010) "The Future is Now: Diegetic Prototypes and the Role of Popular Films in Generating Real-World Technological Development," Social Studies of Science, 40(1): 41-70.
- Kirby, D.A. (2007) "The Devil in Our DNA: A Brief History of Eugenic Themes in Science Fiction Films," Literature and Medicine, 26(1): 83-108.
- Kirby, D.A. (2004) "Extrapolating Race in Gattaca: Genetic Passing, Identity, the New Eugenics, and the Science of Race," Literature and Medicine, 23(1): 184-200.
- Kirby, D.A. (2003) "Scientists on the Set: Science Consultants and Communication of Science in Visual Fiction," Public Understanding of Science, 12(3): 261-278.
- Kirby, D.A. (2003) "Science Consultants, Fictional Films and Scientific Practice," Social Studies of Science, 33(2): 231-268.
- Kirby, D.A. (2000) "The New Eugenics in Cinema: Genetic Determinism and Gene Therapy in GATTACA," Science Fiction Studies, 27(2): 193-215.
- Kirby, D.A., S. V. Muse & W. Stephan (1995) "Maintenance of pre-mRNA Secondary Structure by Epistatic Selection," Proc. of the National Academy of Sciences, 92: 9047-9051.
