= Micro-SFP =

Micro-SFP (μSFP) describes an ultra-short science-fiction story written for the specific purpose of capturing inventive ideas for product or service innovations. It is a combination of three concepts, first science-fiction prototyping (a methodology based on writing fictional stories to instantiate and test ideas for new products, businesses or political systems), second flash fiction (a genre that advocates writing stories as small as just 6 words) and finally, Twitter and texting (messaging and social networking in less than 140 / 160 characters).

== Roots ==
As a tool to influence the future, μSFP has similarities to fables, parables, anecdotes, sayings, proverbs and maxims in that it seeks to capture and communicate an inspirational vision. In literary terms, it is similar to what the English speaking world refer to as flash fiction (sometimes called micro-fiction, nano-fiction, sudden fiction or postcard-fiction), or in Latin-America microrrelato (or ficcione), in France; nouvelles, China minute-long (or smoke-long) and in Japan Haibun. However, given that μSFP was initially devised to capture technological product innovations it was more closely connected to technology platforms such as T(ext)-Fiction (160 characters ~30 words) or Twitter Lit (140 characters or ~25 words). The initial motivation for developing a shorter variant of science fiction prototyping was to provide a type of shorthand for capturing ideas (and the context) quickly, such as in a brain-storming meeting. μSFP was first proposed by Anasol Peña Rios, a researcher at the University of Essex, who used the methodology in support of a 2013 UK event for K12 students called 'The New Creatives'.

== Examples ==
The most widely cited example of flash fiction is Ernest Hemingway's classic six word story "For sale: baby shoes, never worn". Within the science and engineering community, the Creative Science Foundation has run a number of events that have produced examples of μSFPs such as from the New Creatives 2014 in Colchester "Jack fall asleep in the sun. His smart sun protection sensor woke him up with an alarm & soft vibration. He avoids sun strokes!" or from Creative Science 2014 in Shanghai "Zoe, you've been my life-long friend on SentiBook; today the news feed reports most social network friends don't exist, are you real?. The first example was written by a k12 student with a very practical eye on technical innovation whereas the second example was written by a researcher involved in advanced AI, pondering on the possibilities of it achieving the capability to masquerade as people, either openly or surreptitiously, opening up intriguing, if disturbing consequences for human society and relationships.

== Methodology ==
The core methodology of μSFP is the application of flash fiction as shorthand for describing innovative ideas for science, engineering, business and socio-political systems. Generally there are three components to a μSFP; the technology, a simple action and a person. Most literature on μSFP advocates the following steps for writing a μSFP:

- Start by identifying the technology, process or service
- Identify a character (try use a very short person name)
- Then create at plot (events that make up the story – should include an inflection point and a benefit)

Because of its technical roots, Twitter sized μSFPs (140 characters / 25 words) are more common. It is widely acknowledged that writing such ultra-short stories is difficult, so the general advice is to start big, then reduce it. As with larger science fiction prototyping, ideas can come from existing research, fiction or from people's imaginations. Adding a protagonist and context that illustrates the technology in use is an important feature of a μSFP since such prototypes not just describe ideas, but test them by illustrating usage. μSFPs have numerous uses such as teaching English as a foreign language, motivating pre-university students to take up STEM studies and producing real-world technical innovations.

== See also ==
- Creative writing
- Futures studies
