= Lindsay Grace =

American artist, game designer, and professor

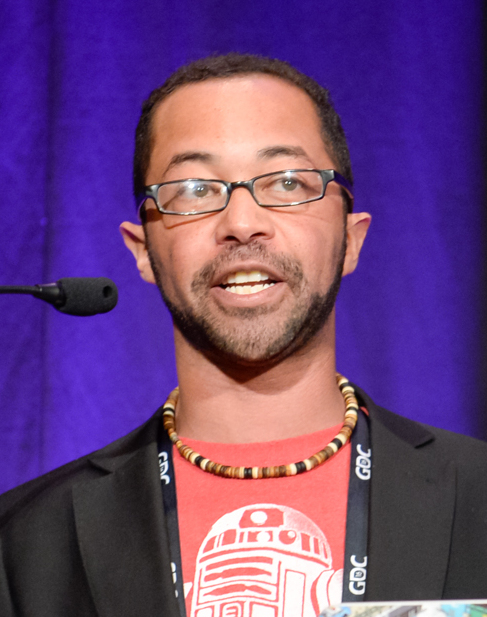
- Grace at the 2016 GDC Education Summit
- Occupations: video game designer, artist, professor
- Employer: University of Miami
- Known for: Critical Gameplay
- Website: www.lgrace.com

Lindsay Grace is an American academic, artist, and video game designer. He currently serves as the Knight Chair of Interactive Media and is also a Professor at the School of Communication, University of Miami.

Grace is well known as an academic game designer who employs critical design. He is the 2019 Games for Change Vanguard Award winner and Knight Chair at the University of Miami. He served as founding director of the American University Game Lab and Studio (JOLT), which includes the Fake News game, Factitious, the NPR game Commuter Challenge and Miami Herald's Gaming the System. In 2013 his game, Wait was inducted in the Games for Change Hall of Fame as one of the five most significant games for change in the last decade. Other notable games include Big Huggin', a game controlled by a giant stuffed animal that players must hug to meet game goals. Big Huggin' was Kickstarted with notable support from Jane McGonigal and selected for the ACM SIGGRAPH's Aesthetics of Gameplay Show.

Grace has created more than 15 independent games, acting as the sole designer, developer, and artist. He has written articles about this process and supports such activity as one of 8 executive board members organizing the Global Game Jam. He also exhibits art internationally and curates exhibits. He co-curated the Indie Arcade 2014 and 2016 events at the Smithsonian American Art Museum.

Lindsay Grace has publicly opposed the link between video games and violence. He was featured in the 2023 PBS American Experience Documentary, Ruthless: Monopoly's Secret History about the board game Monopoly's history.

== Early life and education ==
Grace received his PhD from the University of Portsmouth with a doctoral thesis on Social Impact Game Design for Social Change. He also holds an MFA from the Electronic Visualization Laboratory at the University of Illinois, as well as two degrees from Northwestern University.

== Career ==
From 2013 to 2018, Grace established and led the American University Game Lab and Studio. Between 2014 and 2019, he contributed as a Vice President and board member for the Global Game Jam non-profit. Earlier, from 2009 to 2013, he held the position of C. Michael Armstrong Professor of Creative Arts at Armstrong Institute for Interactive Media Studies, Miami University. He taught video game design, interaction design and theory at American University. Prior to becoming a professor, Lindsay was a software developer and designer, a buyer and a data warehousing integrity analyst at an investment firm.

Grace also had a tenure as a board member for the Digital Games Research Association (DiGRA) during 2013-2015.

== Research and work ==
Grace publishes writing and video games that relate the concept of "philosophy of software" and Critical Design as practice in the arts and games. This practice falls between captology and critical design.

Grace's independent video game publications include Penguin Roll, Zombie Master, Polyglot Cubed and several games under the Mindtoggle Software company. He also writes about games and independent game-making.

In 2008, Grace created Polyglot Cubed which was recognized at the Meaningful play conference at Michigan State, was a serious games showcase finalist at the Interservice/Industry Training, Simulation and Education Conference IITSEC, and the International Conference on Advances in Computer Entertainment Technology. Gamasutra ran an article about it. His research includes algorithmic music generation using visual emergent behavior.

Grace lead the games program at American University School of Communication in Washington D.C.

== Bibliography ==
- Grace, Lindsay D. (2019). Doing Things with Games: Social Impact Through Play. CRC Press. ISBN 0429771312. Retrieved August 22, 2019.
- Grace, L. (2020). Love and Electronic Affection: A Design Primer (editor/author), Routledge Press, ISBN 978-1138367234 . Retrieved September 28, 2020.
- Grace, L. and Huang, K. State of Newsgames 2020 (from Games for Change: 2020 Games for Change Virtual Festival: Newsgame Flyby: State of the Practice 20...). Report at Retrieved September 29, 2020
- Grace, Lindsay (2021): Black Games Studies. Carnegie Mellon University ETC Press. Book. Black Games Studies

== See also ==
- Critical Gameplay
- Big Huggin'
