= Madeline Ashby =

American-Canadian science fiction writer

- Born: April 24, 1983 (age 43); Panorama City, Los Angeles, California, United States
- Education: OCAD University
- Occupation: Writer
- Spouse: David Nickle
- Writing career
- Genre: Science fiction
- Notable work: Company Town

Madeline Ashby (born April 24, 1983 in Panorama City, Los Angeles, California) is an American-Canadian science fiction writer. She is best known for her 2016 novel Company Town, which was selected for the 2017 edition of Canada Reads and was nominated for the 2017 Aurora Award for Best Novel.

She previously published the novels vN (2012) and iD (2013), as well as short stories in anthologies and literary magazines. A graduate of OCAD University, she is a regular columnist for the Ottawa Citizen.

In addition to being a science fiction writer, Ashby has also had jobs working for Intel, the Government of Ontario, and design and communication firms. She lives in Toronto, Ontario.

In 2013, Ashby was nominated for the John W. Campbell Award for Best New Writer, but recused herself on the grounds that her professional writing career had started with her 2009 publication of a short story in Nature and she was thus ineligible.

== Bibliography ==
=== Machine Dynasties series ===
- The Education of Junior Number 12 (novelette, 2011)
- "Give Granny a Kiss" (short story, 2012)
- vN: The First Machine Dynasty (2012)
- iD: The Second Machine Dynasty (2013)
- reV: The Third Machine Dynasty (2020)

=== Other novels ===
- Company Town (2016)
- Glass Houses (2024)

=== Short stories ===
- "In Which Joe and Laurie Save Rock n' Roll" (2007)
- "Fitting a New Suit" (2008)
- "βoyfriend" (2008)
- "Off Track Betting" (2009)
- "The Chair" (2009)
- "Ishin" (2010)
- "Zombies, Condoms and Shenzhen: The Surprising Link Between the Undead and the Unborn" (2010)
- "Social Services" (2013)
- "Come from Away" (2014)
- "By the Time We Get to Arizona" (2014)
- "Memento Mori" (2015)
- "A Stopped Clock" (2015)
- "Be Seeing You" (2015)
- "Thieving Magpie" (2016)
- "Dreams in the Bitch House" (2016)
- "Panic City" (2016)
- "The Japanese Room" (2017)
- "Death on Mars" (2017)
- "Withnail & Us" (2018)
- "Work Shadow/Shadow Work" (2018)
- "Domestic Violence" (2018)
- "Tierra y Libertad" (2018)

=== Non-fiction ===
- How to Future (with Scott Smith, 2020).
