= Creative Science Foundation =

The Creative Science Foundation (CSf) is a non-profit organization, established on 4 November 2011 in London, England, that advocates a synergetic relationship between creative arts (e.g. writing, films, art, dance etc.) and sciences (e.g. engineering, business, socio-political etc.) as a means to fostering innovation. It is best known for its use of science fiction prototyping as an ideation, communication and prototyping tool for product innovation. The foundation's main modus-operandi are the organisation or sponsorship of vacation-schools, workshops, seminars, conferences, journals, publications and projects.

== See also ==
- Futures studies
- Micro-SFP
- Science Fiction Poetry Association
- Science fiction prototyping
- Science Fiction Research Association
- Threatcasting
