= Civilization's Waiting Room =

Research-focused live-action roleplaying game

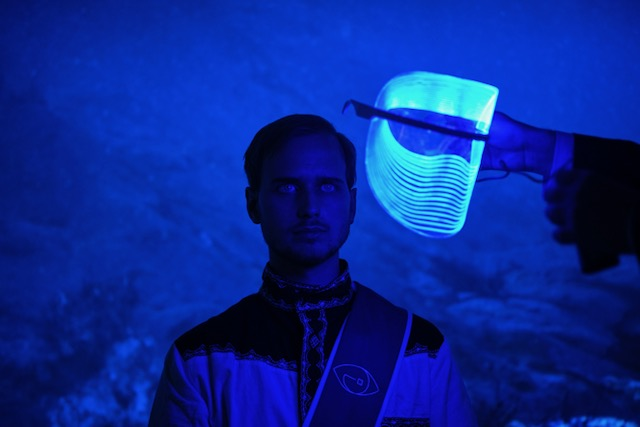
- A participant is ready to commune with the AI Intelligence that rules Civilization. Photographer: Eivind Senneset for UiB.
- Other names: Sivilisasjonens venterom
- Designers: Anita Myhre Andersen, Harald Misje, Jon Andreas Edland, Toril Mjelva Saatvedt, Sebastian Sjøvold, Eskil Mjelva Saatvedt, Marianne Gunderson, Kristian A. Bjørkelo, Jill Walker Rettberg
- Publication: 2021
- Genres: Larp, Nordic larp
- Languages: Norwegian

Sivilisasjonens venterom (Norwegian for "Civilization's Waiting Room") was a research larp (live-action roleplaying game) held in Bergen in November 2021. It was designed to explore the potential of larps as a research methodology and as research dissemination, and was specifically intended to investigate ethical questions that arise when encountering new surveillance technologies.

== Background ==
The project was funded by the Research Council of Norway as part of a scheme to increase the Norwegian impact of EU-funded research. The stated goal was to "create arenas where the general public can practice making ethical decisions about the use of new technologies, specifically machine vision technologies such as facial recognition, deepfakes and VR"

The creative lead for the project was veteran larp developer Anita Myhre Andersen, working with Harald Misje, Jon Andreas Edland, Toril Mjelva Saatvedt, Sebastian Sjøvold and Eskil Mjelva Saatvedt. The researchers in the development team were Marianne Gunderson, Kristian A. Bjørkelo, and Jill Walker Rettberg, who had initiated the project.

The larp drew upon the Nordic larp genre as well as on research on educational larping (Edu-larp) and larps as research tools. In a scholarly paper about Sivilisasjonens venterom, Malthe Stavning Erslev describes it as a research larp, which is "a method of academic knowledge development in its own right".

== Setting and gameplay ==
Civilization's Waiting Room was set in a future where society has unravelled due to climate change and war. The Civilization (Sivilisasjonen) is a city state that is a rare refuge from the surrounding wilderness. It is run by a benevolent AI known as Intelligensen ("the Intelligence") that bases all of its decisions on the sum of all the opinions and interests of the citizens, as it interprets these based on the extensive data it collects and is fed by the citizens. Sivilisasjonen was therefore imagined as an AI-based democracy.

The overall story arc of Sivilisasjonens Venterom unfolded over a dramatic day in the reception hall, starting in the morning with new applicants arriving, and ending in the evening with a ceremony in which those who had learned to manipulate the system were granted citizenship and access to Sivilisasjonen. During the day there were small personal dramas, planned plot twists and unplanned incidents, as well as large-scale hacking of the Intelligence undermining the foundational ideology of Sivilisasjonen. Players experienced conflicts on a personal level, as their characters had their interpersonal relationship challenged by technological mediation, as well as by their shifting interpretation of how this society worked. Participants also experienced large-scale drama as a group when the social framework of the Intelligence cracked and for a little while was replaced by a small group of more individuality-oriented hackers led by one of the organizers.

Three related larps set in the same fictional world were Ettersynsing ("Opticionated"), a short form larp using a dinner table setting that was run at the NORA 2021 conference on AI, Mønsterakademiet, a short larp set in a school that trained citizens for the Civilization, and Hawa, a larp for children run by the larp development company Tidsreiser that was set in another part of the world where there are no adults, and robots bring up children in an attempt to mould them into peaceful, productive citizens.

== Reception ==
Malthe Stavning Erslev analyses his experience of playing Trin in the larp, discussing larps as a mimetic method related to design fiction. However, he found that the focus on the aspects of surveillance that are visible, such as screens and cameras, led to less focus on data-intensive surveillance, and thus the larp could be said "not to challenge imaginaries, but to solidify them."

In his MA thesis, Jon Andreas Edland argued that the "opportunity to observe a theme or situation from different sides and thus grants a larger room for reflection and understanding based on the context of the situation".
