= Critical design =

Aspect of design that challenges preconceptions

Critical design uses design fiction and speculative design proposals to challenge assumptions and conceptions about the role objects play in everyday life. Critical design plays a similar role to product design, but does not emphasize an object's commercial purpose or physical utility. It is mainly used to share a critical perspective or inspire debate, while increasing awareness of social, cultural, or ethical issues in the eyes of the public. Critical design was popularized by Anthony Dunne and Fiona Raby through their firm, Dunne & Raby.

Critical design can make aspects of the future physically present to provoke a reaction. "Critical design is critical thought translated into materiality. It is about thinking through design rather than through words and using the language and structure of design to engage people." It may be conflated with the critical theory or the Frankfurt School, but it is not related.

== Definition ==
A critical design object challenges an audience's preconceptions, provoking new ways of thinking about the object, its use, and the surrounding culture. Its adverse is affirmative design: design that reinforces the status quo. For a project to succeed in critical design, the viewer must be mentally engaged and willing to think beyond the expected and ordinary. Humor is important, but satire is not the goal.

Many practitioners of critical design have never heard of the term itself, and/or would describe their work differently. Referring to it as critical design simply garners more attention to it, and emphasizes that design has applications beyond problem solving.

It is more of an attitude than a style or movement; a position rather than a method. Critical design builds on this attitude by creatively critiquing concepts and ideologies using fabricated artifacts to embody commentaries around everything from consumer culture to the #MeToo Movement. Regardless of its processes, critical design is often discussed as a unique approach in Design Research, perhaps because of its focus on critiquing widely held social, cultural, and technical beliefs. The process of designing such an object, as well as the presentation and narrative around the object itself, allows for reflection on existing cultural values, morals, and practices. In making such an object, critical designers frequently employ classic design processes—research, user experience, iteration—while working to conceptualize scenarios intended to highlight social, cultural, or political paradigms. Design as societal critique is not a new idea.

== History ==
Italian Radical Design of the 1960s and 70s was highly critical of prevailing social values and design ideologies.

The term "critical design" was first used in Anthony Dunne's book Hertzian Tales (1999) and further developed in Design Noir: The Secret Life of Electronic Objects (2001).

According to Sanders, critical design probes "ambiguous stimuli that designers send to people who then respond to them, providing insights for the design process." Uta Brandes identifies critical design as a discrete Design Research method and Bowen integrates it into human-centered design activities as a useful tool for stakeholders to critically think about possible futures.

FABRICA, a communication research center owned by Italian fashion giant Benetton Group, has been actively involved in producing provocative imagery and critical design projects. FABRICA's Visual Communication department, led by Omar Vulpinari, actively participates in critiquing social, political and environmental issues through global awareness campaigns for international magazines and organizations like UN-WHO. Several young artists who have produced critical design projects at FABRICA in recent years are Erik Ravello (Cuba), Yianni Hill (Australia), Marian Grabmayer (Austria), Priya Khatri (India), Andy Rementer (United States), and An Namyoung (South Korea).

== Function ==
To attribute to design practice, critical design broadens the vision in design from traditional practice. It is no longer limited to highlighting the physical function in product design, though this causes some ambiguities in the discussion of critical design's function as it maintains in design area. Matt Malpass addresses Larry Ligo's classification of five different types of function: Structural articulation, Physical function, Psychological function, Social function, as well as Cultural-existential function in his article, with a further discussion of how Modernism leaves a narrower understanding of physical utility when we think about function, which leads to the ambiguity in critical design's function. As critical design focuses on present social, cultural, and ethical implications of design objects and practice, it mostly emphasizes on social and cultural impact from its function.

In addition, critical design objects have a lot of potential to contribute to testing ideas during the process of the development of new technology. As Dunne and Raby express their concerns about always lacking communication between the specialists and the general public to form a two-way discussion of new technology. It always limits to one-way flow from specialists to the public. Critical design provides a stage to give scenarios, completes the dialog between specialists and the general public and helps to collect feedback from the public for further refinements before the idea is going too far for any changes.

== Critical play ==
Researcher Mary Flanagan wrote Critical Play:Radical Game Design in 2009, the same year that Lindsay Grace started the Critical Gameplay project. Grace's Critical Gameplay project is an internationally exhibited collection of video games that apply critical design. The games provoke questions about the way games are designed and played. The Critical Gameplay Game, Wait, was awarded the Games for Change hall of fame award for being one of the 5 most important games for social impact since 2003. The work has been shown at Electronic Language International Festival, Games, Learning & Society Conference, Conference on Human Factors in Computing Systems among other notable events.

== Critiques ==
As critical design has gained mainstream exposure, the discipline has been itself criticized by some for dramatizing so-called 'dystopian scenarios,' which may, in fact, be reflective of real-life conditions in some places in the world. Some see critical design as rooted in the fears of a wealthy, urban, western population and failing to engage with existing social problems. As an example, a project titled Republic of Salivation, by designers Michael Burton and Michiko Nitta, featured as part of MoMA's Design and Violence series, portrays a society plagued by overpopulation and food scarcity which is reliant on heavily modified, government-provided, nutrient blocks. Certain media responses to the work, point to the "presumed naivety of the project," which presents a scenario that "might be dystopian to some, but in some other parts of the world it has been the reality for decades."

== Critical acclaim ==
In recognition of their formalization of the field, Anthony Dunne and Fiona Raby were presented with the inaugural MIT Media Lab Award in June 2015 with director Joichi Ito pointing out that "[Dunne and Raby's] pioneering approach to critical design and its intersection with science, technology, art, and the humanities has changed the landscape of design education and practice worldwide."

== Distinctions with Conceptual art ==
Conceptual art practice has a very similar role as critical design since both of them are sharing critical perspectives to the public and being commentators to issues, the public may get confused to understand these two different fields. However, Matt Malpass points out that the critical designer still applies the skills from the training and practice as designer but re-orientates these skills from a focus on practical ends to a focus on design work that functions symbolically, culturally, existentially, and discursively. Critical design objects are made precisely based on the design principles and carefully follow the design and design research process. Also, critical design objects always stay close to people's everyday life. They tend to be tested on real people and get feedback for further developments. Conceptual art usually associates with gallery spaces and mostly tends to apply the artistic media in the process.

== See also ==
- Social fiction
- Design fiction
- Critical making
- Critical technical practice
- Science fiction prototyping
- Speculative design
- Talk to Me (exhibition) (MoMA), 2011
- Design and the Elastic Mind (exhibition) (MoMA), 2008
