= Threatcasting =

Conceptual framework

Threatcasting is a conceptual framework used to help multidisciplinary groups envision future scenarios. It is also a process that enables systematic planning against threats ten years in the future. Utilizing the threatcasting process, groups explore possible future threats and how to transform the future they desire into reality while avoiding undesired futures. Threatcasting is a continuous, multiple-step process with inputs from social science, technical research, cultural history, economics, trends, expert interviews, and science fiction storytelling. These inputs inform the exploration of potential visions of the future.

Once inputs are explored for impact and application, participants create a science fiction story (science fiction prototyping) based ten years in the future to add context around human activity. Science Fiction Prototyping consists of a future story about a person in a place doing a thing. The threatcasting process results in creation of many potential futures scenarios—some futures are desirable while others are not. Identifying both types of futures (desirable and undesirable) will help the participant recognize which future to aim toward, and which to avoid. Utilizing the scenarios, participants plot actions necessary in the present and at various intervals working toward the ten year future scenario. These actions will help participants understand how to empower or disrupt the target future scenario. Flags (warning events) are also determined in order to map societal indicators onto the recommended path toward the targeted future. When identified flags appear in society, threatcasting participants map these back to the original forecast to see whether or not they are on track toward the target future scenario.

== Origins ==
The notion of threatcasting can be traced back to Brian David Johnson, an applied futurist, who first began using threatcasting, also referred to as futurecasting, in 2011 and to George Hemingway of the Stratalis Group, who pioneered notion of futurecasting for corporate strategy and innovation industrial markets, including mining in the same year. Early adopters of threatcasting include the United States Air Force Academy, the Government of California, and the Army Cyber Institute at West Point Military Academy. Official use of the term threatcasting is attributed to Brian David Johnson in a 2014 Gazette article “Drones, smart hydrants considered by experts looking at future of firefighting.” and to George Hemingway, who referenced the same in a 2013 article on "Futurecasting the mining industry".

== Differences between threatcasting and strategic planning ==
Threatcasting is different from traditional strategic planning and scenario analysis processes due to the identification of specific actions, indicators and concrete steps that can be taken today to disrupt, mitigate and recover from future threats.

== Applications ==
The Army Cyber Institute at West Point in conjunction with Arizona State University's Global Securities Initiative and the School for the Future of Innovation in Society have established a Threatcasting Lab to host and manage a Cyber Threatcasting Project which looks to envision future cyber threats ten years in the future. The first session of this collaborative group was held at West Point, NY in August 2016.

== See also ==
- Accelerating change
- Backcasting
- Creative science foundation
- Forecasting
- Foresight (futures studies)
- Futures studies
- Futures techniques
- Market environment § Environmental scanning
- Outline of futures studies
- Science fiction prototyping
- Scenario planning
- Strategic foresight
- Systems thinking
- Technology roadmap
- Technology forecasting
- Trend analysis

== Notes ==
- Knapp, Alex. Brian David Johnson: Intel's Guide to the Future. Forbes, October 13, 2011.
- U.S. Air Force Academy Public Affairs. 'Future-casting' wildfires. United States Air Force Academy. February 7, 2014.
- Roeder, Tom. Drones, smart hydrants considered by experts looking at future of firefighting. The Gazette, February 21, 2014.
- Johnson, Brian David. Futurecasting, The Future of Wildfire.
- #innovateearthquakes! FIT's day of technology innovation for disaster management. September 5, 2015.
- Lee, Ryan. "Threatcasting". IEEE Computer, vol. 49, no., pp. 94–95, Oct. 2016, doi:10.1109/MC.2016.305.
- Bennett, Michael and Johnson, Brian David. Dark Future Precedents.
- Science Fiction, Futurism and Law. Intelligent Environments 2016. doi:10.3233/978-1-61499-690-3-506
- Petrov, Jan. Shmoocon 2017: Threat-Casting, Fake News, and Ransomware. Kraft Kennedy. February 6, 2017.
- Johnson, Brian David. A Widening Attach Plain. Army Cyber Institute. February, 2017
