= Scott Smith (futurist) =

Futurist, strategist, and writer

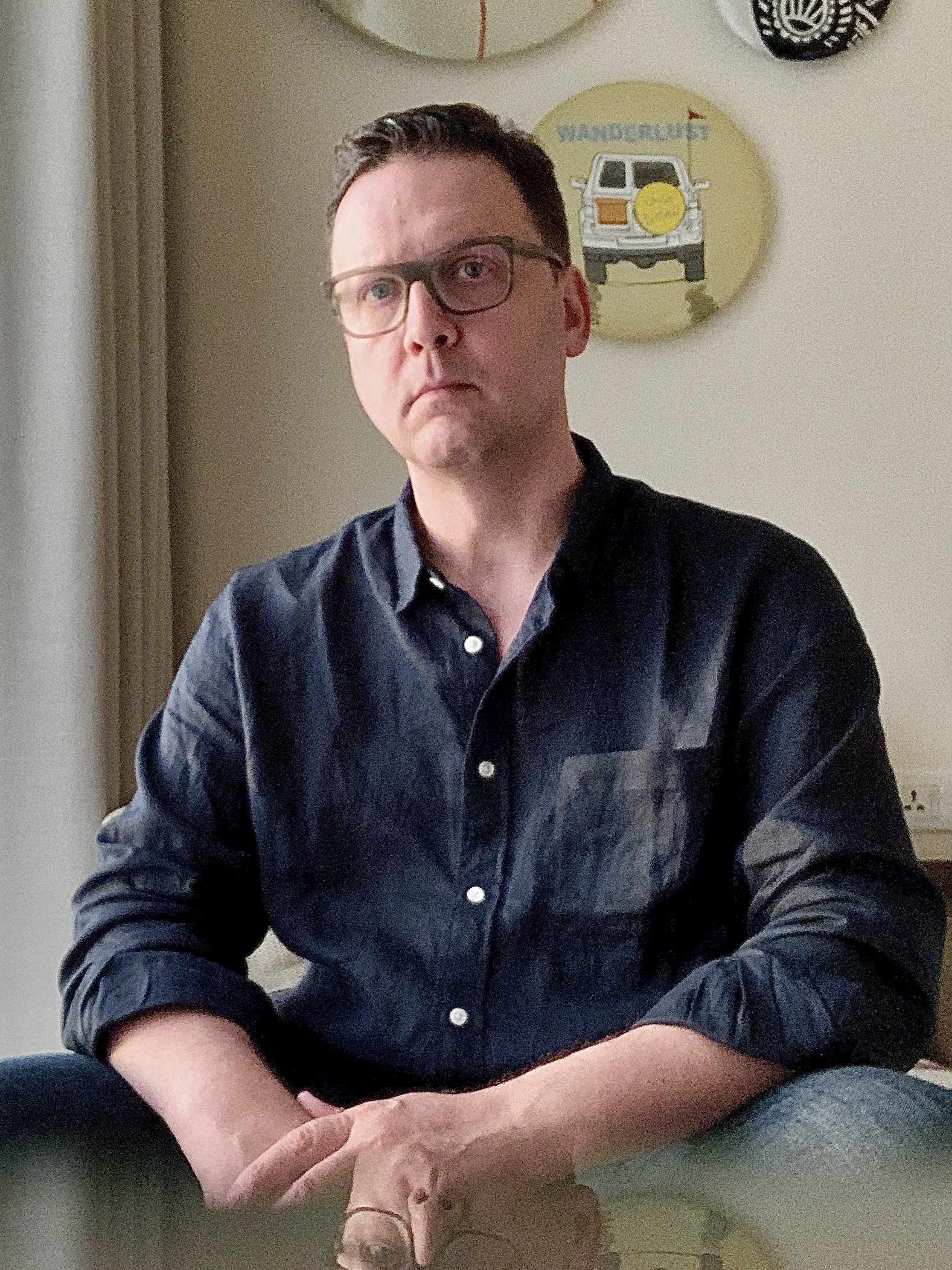
- Born: 1967 (age 58–59)
- Occupations: futurist, strategist, and writer
- Organization: Changeist

Scott Smith (born 1967) is an American futurist, strategist, and writer. He is the founder and managing partner of Changeist, a futures research and consulting practice established in 2007, and the author of How to Future (2020) and, with Susan Cox-Smith, Future Cultures (2023). He is known for coining the phrase "flatpack futures", which refers to "future technological systems which are imagined as readymade products that people will choose to adopt, rather than as the assembled work of countless different actors." Smith argues that this conception of the way the future will play out is limiting and counterproductive.

In 2023 the United Nations Development Programme's Future Trends and Signals System, co-led by Smith and John Willshire with UNDP, received and honourable mention in the Association of Professional Futurists' IF Awards, In 2025 Smith co-founded the 10F Consortium, an independent group of foresight practitioners that publishes open-licensed forecasts.

== Career ==
Smith began his technology forecasting career in 1995 as the Director of Digital Commerce at Jupiter Communications, one of the earliest Internet research companies, helping companies prepare for the online world. He moved on to Director of Internet Business Strategies for Current Analysis in Sterling, Virginia in 1997. From 1999 through 2002 he was Director Networked Business Strategies Europe at the Yankee Group, and then worked as Director of Research Applications at Social Technologies (later Innovaro) until founding Changeist with Susan Cox-Smith in 2007.

Smith is the founder and managing partner of Changeist, a futures research and consulting company established in 2007 which has worked with UNICEF, Comcast, Nokia, and NASA to assist them in preparing for a complex future. He was also co-developer and advisor for the Futures Institute at the Duke University TIP program, and designed the Innovation & Future Thinking summer professional program at IED Barcelona.

In 2016, Smith took part in the panel discussion following the inaugural University of South Australia Enterprise Oration, held as part of the Adelaide Festival of Ideas and Open State. Smith and Cox-Smith were later named the inaugural SA Water Visiting Research Fellows in residence at MOD., the University of South Australia's museum of discovery.

Since 2019 he has sat on the executive board of the Center for Futures Studies at the University of Dubai, alongside Peter Bishop, Andy Hines and Terry Grim, founding members of the Association of Professional Futurists.

He is a frequent keynote speaker at Media Future Week, NEXT, and Lift conferences. At NEXT19 in Hamburg he presented "Building Speculative Leadership" with Sophie Howe, Wales's first Future Generations Commissioner.

Smith was interviewed on France 24's technology programme Tech24 in January 2020 on the practice of forecasting, and was quoted on design fiction in a February 2020 MIT Technology Review feature by Tim Maughan.

In 2025 Smith co-founded the 10F Consortium, an independent group of foresight practitioners that published a set of ten open-licensed forecasts for the decade 2025–2035. The project was the subject of a July 2026 public conversation hosted by the Institute for the Future. Smith and Cox-Smith have also discussed their work on foresight practice and the 10F forecasts with the Siemens Xcelerator Community.

Smith was a columnist for Quartz from 2012–2016, and wrote the Discontinuities column for Thesigers' Current Intelligence from 2011–2013.

== Writing ==
- Embed: Mapping the Future of Work and Play: A case for "Embedding" Non-Ethnographers in the Field (with Andrew Greenman), Ethnographic Praxis in Industry Conference Proceedings 2006(1), September 2006.
- Ludic Foresight (with Suzanne Stein), 2011.
- The Singularity is Boring: An Open, Collaborative 'Mock-up', Journal of Futures Studies, September 2012, 17(1): 151–158.
- Coda: Communicating Futures – An Uncommon Urge, Journal of Futures Studies, September 2012, 17(1): 159–160.
- How to Future: Leading and Sense-making in an Age of Hyperchange (with Madeline Ashby), Kogan Page, 2020.
- Future Cultures: How to Build a Future-Ready Organization Through Leadership (with Susan Cox-Smith), Kogan Page, 2023.
- Contributor, At a Distance: 100 Visionaries at Home in a Pandemic (eds. Spencer Bailey and Andrew Zuckerman), Apartamento Publishing / The Slowdown, 2021, p. 299. ISBN 978-84-09-32537-5

== Reception ==
How to Future was reviewed by Samantha Culp in The Atlantic as part of a 2021 essay on the history of popular futurist writing since Alvin Toffler's Future Shock.

== Honours ==
In 2023 the United Nations Development Programme's Future Trends and Signals System, co-led by Smith and John Willshire with UNDP, received and honourable mention in the Association of Professional Futurists' IF Awards.
