= Dunne & Raby =

Dunne & Raby is a London-based design studio established 1994.

Dunne & Raby uses design as a medium to stimulate discussion and debate amongst designers, industry and the public about the social, cultural and ethical implications of current and emerging technologies. Its practice is centred on Critical Design, a critical theory approach to design.

== Principals ==
Anthony Dunne studied Industrial Design at the RCA before working at Sony Design in Tokyo. On returning to London he completed a PhD in Computer Related Design at the RCA.

From 2005 to 2015 he was Professor and Head of the Design Interactions department at the Royal College of Art (RCA) in London. Upon his resignation from the RCA, MoMA senior curator Paola Antonelli stated that Dunne and Raby's tenure had "changed the course of design".

Fiona Raby studied Architecture at the RCA, and an MPhil in Computer Related Design at the RCA.

They were founding members of the CRD Research Studio, where they also worked as Senior Research Fellows.

After leaving the Royal College of Art they moved to New York to take up teaching positions at the Parsons New School and direct the Designed Realities Studio.

== Awards ==
Dunne and Raby were shortlisted for the Perrier-Jouet Selfridges Design Award in 2000. In July 2015 they received the inaugural MIT Media Lab Award at the Massachusetts Institute of Technology, Boston.

== Exhibits ==
Their projects have been exhibited and published internationally and are in the permanent collection of several museums including The Museum of Modern Art in New York, the Victoria and Albert Museum in London and FrAC centre and they have exhibited at The Science Museum (London), and The Pompidou Centre (Paris) (group exhibition). Dunne & Raby have worked with Sony UK, National Panasonic, France Telecom and The Science Museum. They have published three books, Hertzian Tales (The MIT Press), Design Noir (Princeton Architectural Press), and Speculative Everything (MIT Press).

== See also ==
- Fiona Raby
- Anthony Dunne
