= Critical Gameplay =

American video game developer

- Native name: Critical Gameplay
- Type: Private
- Industry: Videogames
- Founder: Lindsay Grace
- Headquarters: Washington, D.C., United States

Critical Gameplay is a video game developer, founded in 2009 by game developer Lindsay Grace.

== List of games ==
Each of the following games was developed under rapid prototyping constraints, by a single developer, designer and artist for the Critical Gameplay exhibition. Each game was developed in a weekend (art, code, and design) and then tweaked over a week. As such the games are developed under a more independent development model. The games return to the romantic notion of a lone-developer making a game late into the night.

The games listed are a subset of the Critical Gameplay collection which is an evolving collection of game notions.

The games are aesthetically designed to mimic characteristics of the game mechanics within their historical context (indicated by the date following). Each is designed to critique a specific gameplay mechanic from that year's standards.

- Charity (1978)
- Black/White (1985)
- Simultaneity (1985)
- EveryDay Heroes: Home (1990)
- Levity (1994)
- Healer (1996)
- You (1997)
- Bang! (1998)
- Match (2003)
- Wait (2005)
- Big Huggin' is an affection game (2011).
- Stolen Kisses (2013)

== Exhibitions ==
=== 2009 ===
Their first exhibition of Critical Gameplay was done on April 17, 2009, on West Cermak Gallery, Chicago, Illinois, US.

Their second exhibition was on September 22, 2009, at Digital Expo on Miami University, Oxford, Ohio, US

The third exhibition was done in October/November 2009 at the annual Symposium of the Special Commission of Games and Digital Entertainment of the Computing Brazilian Society (SBGames 2009) on Rio de Janeiro, Brazil.

The fourth exhibition was done in October 2009 on ACE2009 Creative Exhibition in Athens, Greece.

Their last exhibition in 2009 was on International Digital Media and Art Association's 7th Annual conference on Ball State University in Muncie, Indiana.

=== 2010 ===
- In April 2010 Critical Gameplay had an exhibit at Chi2010 (Conference on Human Factors in Computing Systems), at Atlanta, Georgia, US
- Their second exhibit was held at Meaningful Play 2010 on East Lansing Technology Innovation Center, East Lansing, Michigan, US
- Their last exhibition was held at International Digital Media and Art Association's 7th Annual conference on Vancouver British Columbia, Canada

=== 2011 ===
- In July 2011 Critical Gameplay had an exhibition at Games + Learning + Society Conference in Madison, Wisconsin

=== 2012 ===
- Their first exhibition on 2012 was done in June 2012 in Games, Learning, Society Conference on Madison, Wisconsin, Big Huggin' was available for play in juried art gallery.
- In July–August 2012 they had an exhibition on FILE Festival at Centro Cultural FIESP, São Paulo, Brazil.
- July 2012 on Artscape, Baltimore, Maryland, US
- October 2012 at Punk Arcade on Little Berlin Gallery, Philadelphia, Pennsylvania, US
- October 2012 at Meaningful Play on East Lansing Technology Innovation Center at Michigan State University, East Lansing, Michigan, US
- November 2012 on Computer Art Congress 3 (Post Digital Art) on Paris, France

=== 2013 ===
- June 2013 on Games for change festival at New World Stages, New York City, New York
- July 2013, 5th Annual Game Play Festival, Brooklyn, New York, US
- July 2013, Artscape, Baltimore, Maryland, US
- September 2013, Boston Festival of Independent Games, Massachusetts Institute of Technology, Boston, Massachusetts, US
- November 2013, International Digital Media Arts Exhibit (IDEAS), Laguna Beach College of Art and Design, Laguna Beach, California US
- November 2013, 10th International Conference on Advances in Computer Entertainment Technology (ACE)

University of Twente, Bad Boekelo, Enschede, Netherlands

=== 2014 ===
- January 2014, on 12th Annual Magfest at National Harbor, Maryland, US, where Big Huggin' and Black Like Me available for play
- April 2014 at 9th International Conference on the Foundations of Digital Games on Fort Lauderdale, Florida, US and Cozumel, Mexico
- March–April 2014 at The Aesthetics of Gameplay, exhibited online
- July 2014, on 33rd Annual Artscape (Gamescape exhibits) in Baltimore, Maryland, US
- August 4, 2014, on Digital Games Research Association (DiGRA) Annual Conferencein Salt lake City, Utah, US
- September 2014, at Computer Art Congress in Nano Federal University, Rio de Janeiro, Brazil. Black Like Me available for play
- November 2014, at International Conference on Interactive Digital Storytelling Exhibition on ArtScience Museum at Marina Bay Sands, Singapore
- November 2014, at International Digital Media and Arts Association Exhibit (IDEAS), Utah Valley University, Salt Lake City, Orem, US
- November 2014, Advances in Computer Entertainment (ACE2014) in Funchal, Madeira, Portugal
- Their last exhibition in December 2014 was on Indies from the Middle at Smithsonian American Art Museum on Washington DC, US, where they show their game Big Huggin', a demo was available for play

=== 2015 ===
- July 2015, 34th Annual Artscape (Gamescape exhibits) in Baltimore, Maryland, US

== See also ==
- Lindsay Grace
- Big Huggin'
