= Julian Bleecker =

American academic

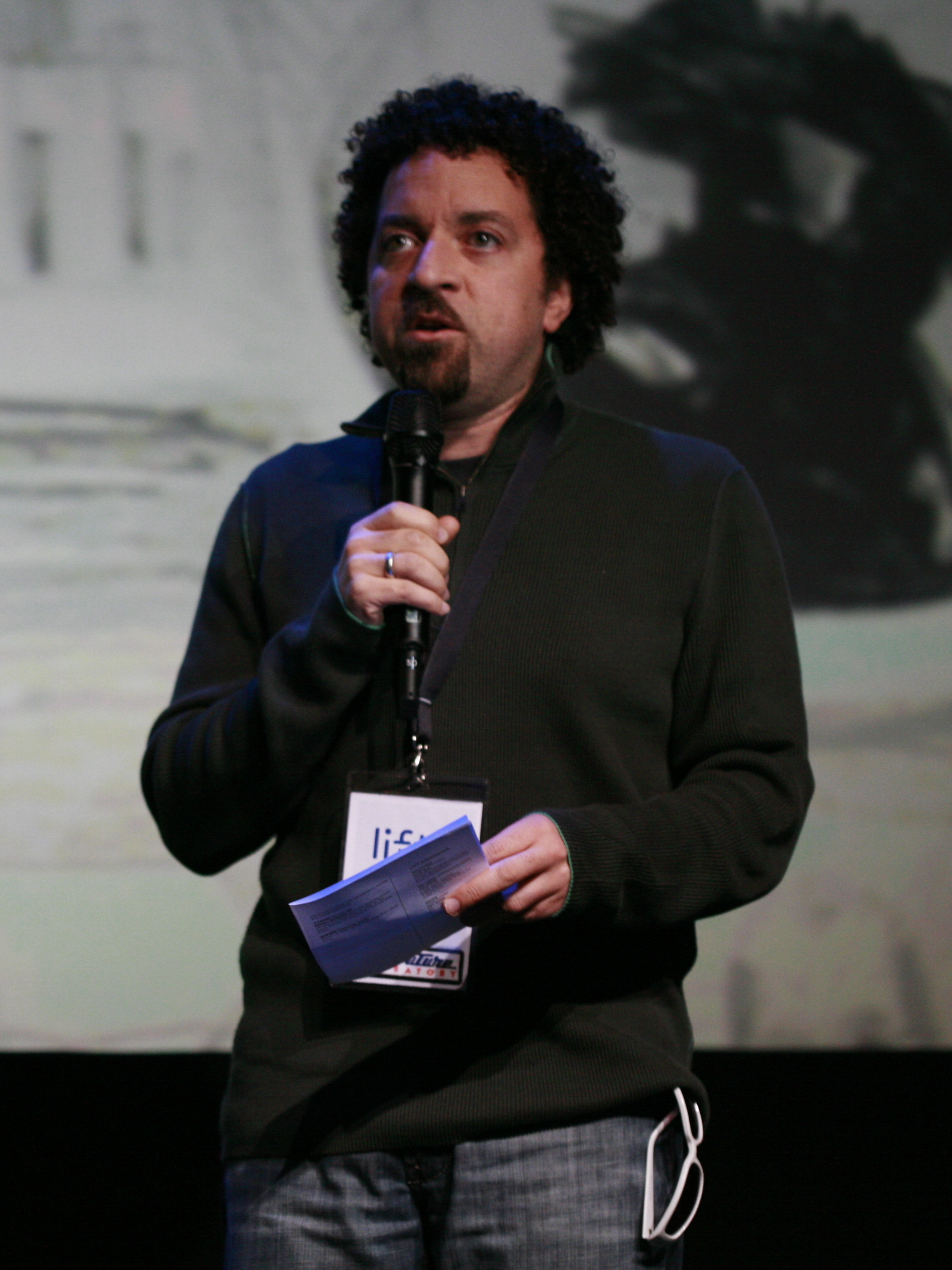
Bleecker speaking in 2008

Julian Bleecker is an artist and technologist with a history developing innovative mobile research projects.

== Career ==
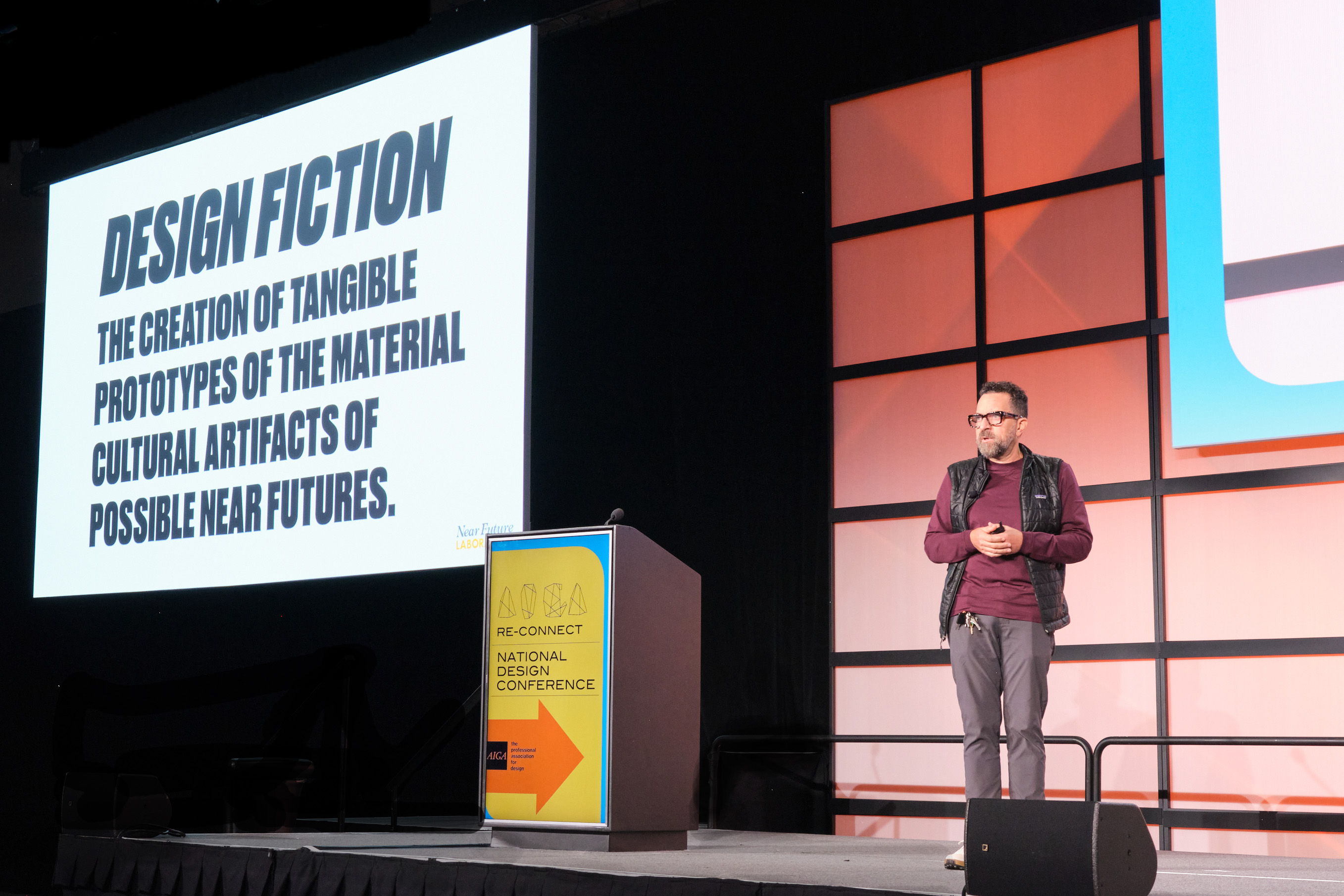
Bleecker giving the Keynote at the 2022 AIGA Conference in Seattle, Washington

Bleecker holds a Ph.D. from the History of Consciousness Program at University of California, Santa Cruz where he studied with Donna Haraway, Angela Davis, Victor Burgin, and James Clifford.

He has been an artist-in-residence at Eyebeam, exhibited work at Ars Electronica, a research fellow at the Annenberg Center for Communication and an assistant professor at the USC Interactive Media Division.

Bleecker has been active as a researcher in the areas of mobile computing, pervasive networks and near-field interaction systems. In 2006, with Nicolas Nova, he organized a workshop entitled "Networked Objects" at [EPFL | Ecole Polytechnique Fédérale de Lausanne], held in May 2006, exploring his interest in Near-Field Interaction and the Internet of Things.

This vector of research on mobile computing, pervasive networks and near-field or proximity-based interaction systems has been a theme of Bleecker's research and design projects for a number of years. One of his earlier projects in this area was PDPal (2003–2005), a series of technology project that investigated how mobile devices could be integrated into a system to allow people to annotate the experiences they have, as in a location-specific diary. The PDPal series was commissioned by Eyebeam in New York City, and the Walker Art Center in Minneapolis to find ways for creating art-technology projects that made use of readily available mobile devices, such as PDAs and mobile phones. PDPal was a collaborative project with designers Marina Zurkow and Scott Patterson.

Other more exploratory projects looked at ways to use common technologies, such as WiFi, in unexpected ways. WiFi.Bedouin and WiFi.ArtCache were two projects that use wireless communications networks to create local networks that make digital content available in very location-specific ways. WiFi.ArtCache was invited for exhibition at ISEA 2006 in San Jose, California, and was the winner of the Audience Choice Award. It was also commissioned for exhibition at the group show "Reclaim the Spectrum" in Seville, Spain (2006).

More playful commissioned art-technology projects include "Pussy Weevil", an animated, sensor-based, screen-based character, which was selected for exhibition at Ars Electronica (2005), the Museum of the Moving Image in New York City (2003–2004), and Art Interactive in Boston (2003).

Bleecker was lead technologist on the Sonic Memorial Project, a Peabody Award-winning website and radio documentary based on audio recollections of the events of September 11.

In 2008 he wrote the essay Design Fiction: A Short Essay on Design, Science, Fact and Fiction that lead to the development of the futures design approach Design Fiction.

He founded his cycling product company OMATA in 2014 after working for 7 years at Nokia, and sold it in 2021. He now focuses his time on developing the third evolution of Near Future Laboratory , a multidisciplinary consultancy and global community focused on developing more robust futures practices through Design Fiction. His podcast The Near Future Laboratory Podcast features discussions on the relationship between imagination, creativity, and innovation practices.

== Bibliography ==
- The Manual of Design Fiction: A Practical Guide to Exploring The Near Future. http://themanualofdesignfiction.com
- It's Time To Imagine Harder: The Reader's Guide to The Manual of Design Fiction. https://shop.nearfuturelaboratory.com/products/imagine-harder-the-readers-guide-to-the-manual-of-design-fiction
- Design Fiction: A Short Essay on Design, Science, Fact and Fiction. http://nearfuturelaboratory.com/2009/03/17/design-fiction-a-short-essay-on-design-science-fact-and-fiction/
- Hello, Skater Girl. August 2012. First comprehensive photo book of women who skate. https://www.youtube.com/watch?v=1bQDiuQIP4k&ab_channel=JulianBleecker.
- A Brief Bibliography And Taxonomy Of GPS-Enabled Locative Media. Leonardo Electronic Almanac, v. 14, no. 3. (co-authored with Jeff Knowlton). https://web.archive.org/web/20061014172644/http://leoalmanac.org/journal/Vol_14/lea_v14_n03-04/jbleecker.asp
- A Manifesto for Networked Objects — Cohabitating with Pigeons, Arphids and Aibos In The Internet of Things. February 2006. A point of view essay on design approaches within the idioms of pervasive networks, networked-based sensor platforms and the "Internet of Things." Published on my research blog at https://web.archive.org/web/20060908161927/http://research.techkwondo.com/blog/julian/185
- A Design Approach for the Geospatial Web. June 2005. A point of view article on design for Location Based Services and geo-tagging for the Geospatial Web, published on the O'Reilly Network web site. https://www.oreillynet.com/pub/a/network/2005/06/07/geospatialweb.html
- WiFi.Bedouin. In Vectors Journal of Culture and Technology in a Dynamic Vernacular, Issue 2, Fall 2005. https://web.archive.org/web/20070928141110/http://vectors.iml.annenberg.edu/index.php?page=8%7C2&projectId=12
- Cybertypes. February 2003. A book review of Lisa Nakamura's book on the politics of identity in the context of the internet. Resource Center for Cyberculture Studies. https://web.archive.org/web/20061006002329/http://www.com.washington.edu/rccs/bookinfo.asp?AuthorID=57&BookID=182
- MobileDNA. November 2002. Paper delivered at the American Anthropology Association annual conference, on the invited panel "Making New Things."
- The Race for Cyberspace: Information Technology in the Black Diaspora. September 2001. With Ron Eglash, Science as Culture, Volume 10, Number 3, September 1, 2001, pp. 353–374.
- Mobile Realities. September 2001. Paper delivered at the 2001 meeting of the Society for the Social Studies of Science. Presents the technical and social history of mobile technology.
- The Simulation Crisis. April 1996. Presentation at Cornell University Workshop "Simulating Knowledge: Cultural Analysis of Computer Modeling in the Life Sciences.
- Urban Crisis: Past, Present, and Virtual. Winter 1995. An analysis of the computer simulation game, SimCity2000 informed by race theory and cultural studies. Socialist Review, Winter 1994-95, v. 24, no. 1-2.
- Virtual Reality, Vision Culture, Technology: Re-Establishing Cultural Production. February 1993. Paper delivered at the 81st Annual College Art Association conference on the panel "Pictures from the Hyperworld: The Artist in Technoculture."
