= Centre for the History of Science, Technology and Medicine (Manchester) =

English research centre

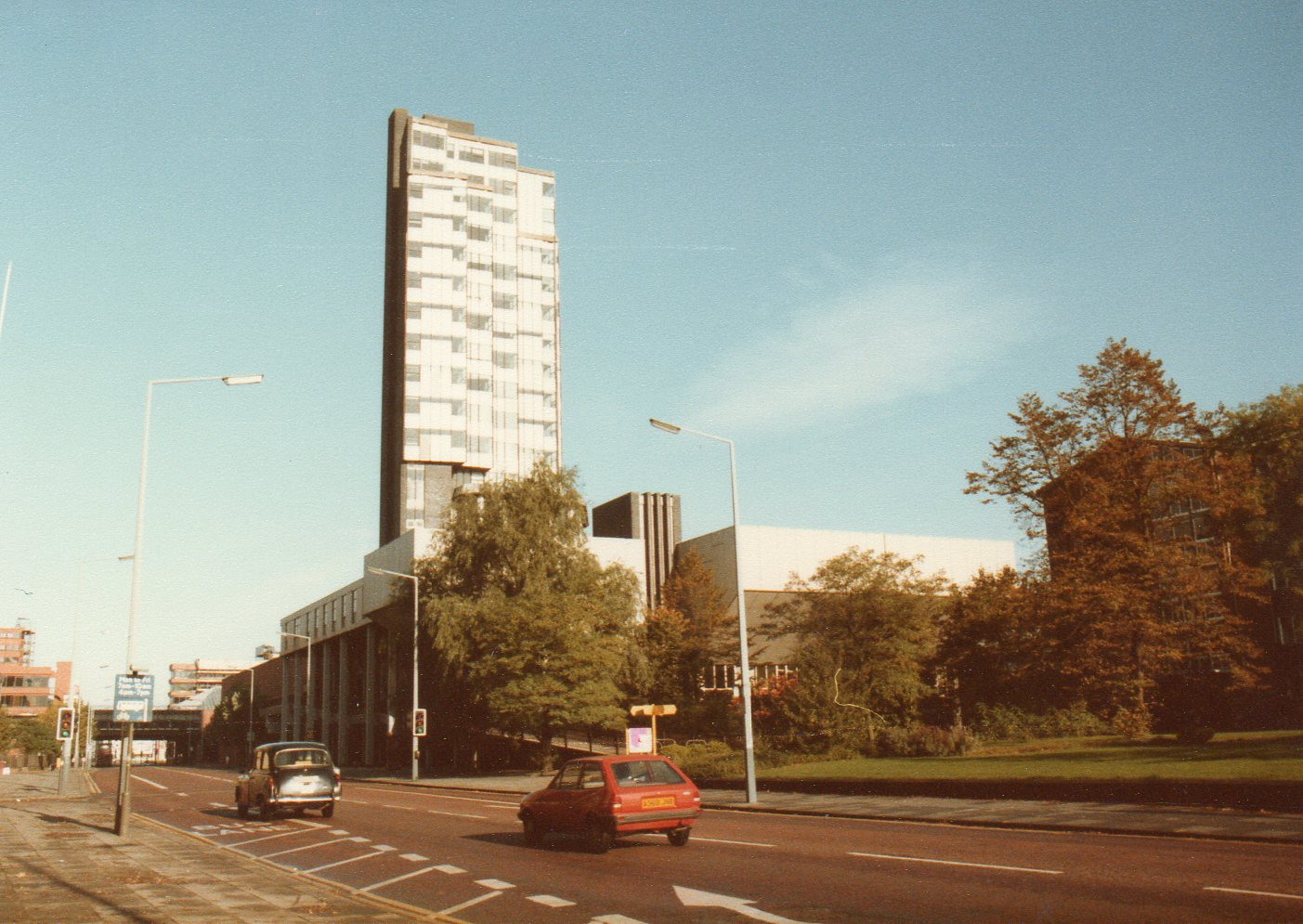
The Mathematics Tower, Victoria University of Manchester (

The Centre for the History of Science, Technology and Medicine (CHSTM) at the University of Manchester is one of the largest groups in Britain researching and teaching the History of Science, Technology and Medicine (HSTM) as one integrated field of study.

== History ==
The Centre for the History of Science, Technology and Medicine was established by John Pickstone at the Victoria University of Manchester in 1986, following his move from UMIST. Initially, part of the university's Department of Science and Technology Policy (STP), CHSTM, was set up to consolidate and develop work on the History of Science, the History of Medicine and the History of Technology in Manchester, the surrounding regions and beyond. It was housed in the Mathematics Tower. The Centre included a Wellcome Unit for the History of Medicine, funded by the Wellcome Trust and the UK National Archive for the History of Computing, that is now held by the University of Manchester Library.

Following the merger of UMIST and the Victoria University of Manchester in 2004 and then directed by Michael Worboys, the Centre joined the new Faculty of Life Sciences (FLS). In 2013 CHSTM hosted the 24th International Congress in the History of Science, Technology and Medicine, organised by the International Union of History and Philosophy of Science. In 2016 FLS merged with the Faculty of Medicine and the Human Sciences, and CHSTM became part of the new Faculty of Biology, Medicine and Health.

== See also ==
- University of Manchester
