= Scott Smith (field hockey) =

Canadian field hockey player

Scott Smith (born August 13, 1972 in Winnipeg, Manitoba) is a former field hockey player from Canada who earned his first senior cap for the Men's National Team in India in 1995.

The ex-resident of Boston, United States has worked as an NCAA Field Hockey Coach.

== International senior competitions ==
- 1995 – India Gold Cup, Chandigarh
- 1999 – World Indoor Classics, Glasgow (1st)
- 1999 – Akhbar El Yom Tournament, Cairo (3rd)
- 1999 – Sultan Azlan Shah Cup, Kuala Lumpur (4th)
- 2002 – Indoor Pan American Cup, Rockville, Maryland (1st)
