= Fiona Raby =

British artist and designer (born 1963)

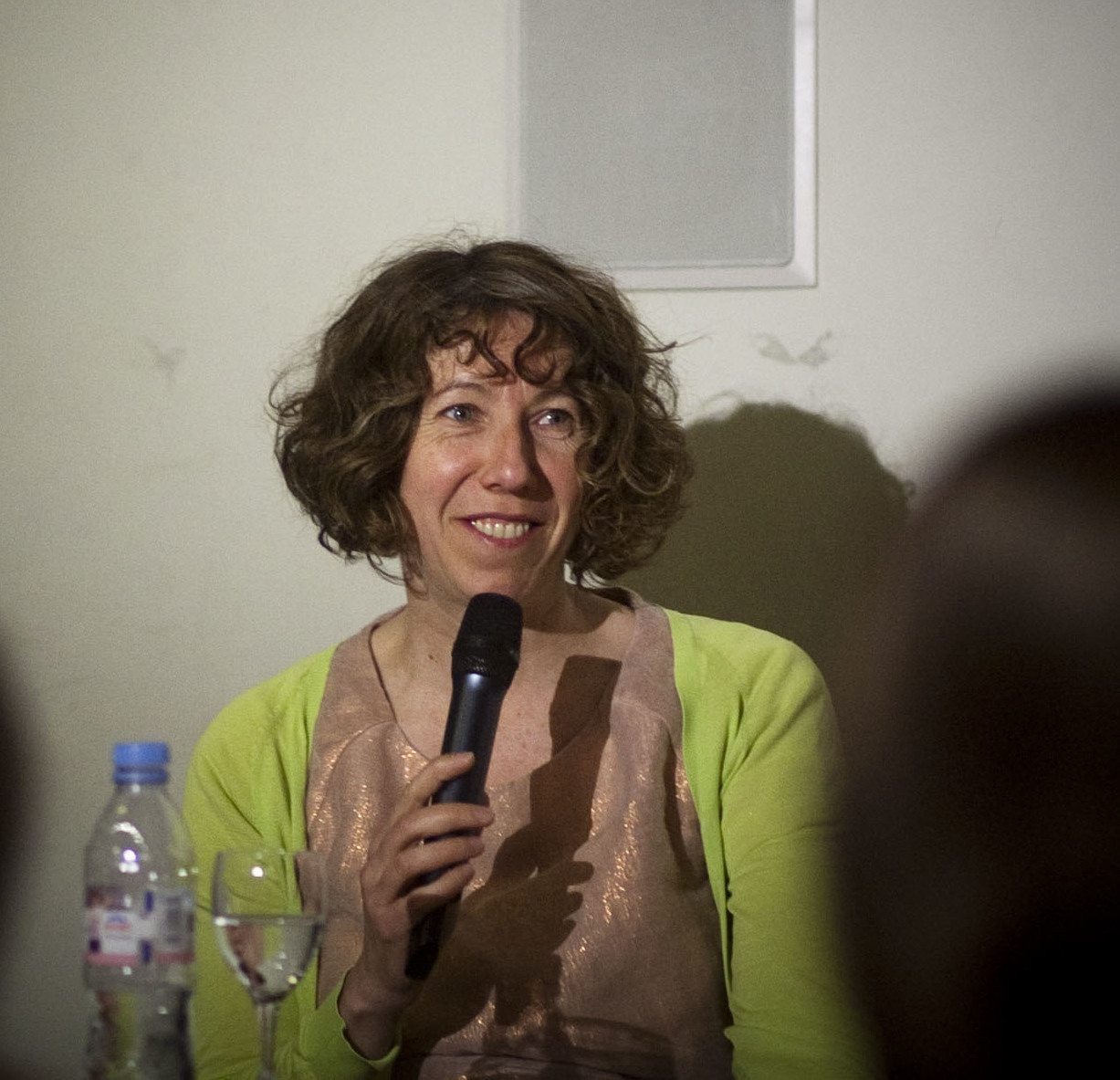

Fiona Raby (born 1963) is a British artist and University Professor of Design and Social Inquiry at The New School. She served as professor of Industrial design at the University of Applied Arts Vienna. She was also a member of the research and teaching staff at the Royal College of Art (RCA) from 1994 to 2015. She left to focus on her partnership with Dunne & Raby. Her work, in collaboration with partner Anthony Dunne, is part of the Museum of Modern Art's (MoMA) permanent collection.

Dunne & Raby are known for a practice of design referred to as speculative design, which they championed across education and within the design field.

She studied Architecture at the RCA, before completing an MPhil in Computer Related Design (CRD) at the RCA. She is one of the founding members of the CRD Research Studio at RCA. In 2001, she was shortlisted for the Perrier-Jouet design prize.

With partner Anthony Dunne, Fiona moved their teaching practice from the Royal College of Art (RCA) to Parsons in New York. The duo have been appointed professors of Design and Emerging Technology at The New School, which encompasses Parsons School of Design.

== Publications ==
- Anthony Dunne and Fiona Raby,Design Noir: The Secret Life of Electronic Objects, Basel: Birkhäuser, 2001. ISBN 978-3-7643-6566-0.
- Anthony Dunne and Fiona Raby, 'Between Reality and the Impossible' In: Biennale Internationale Design Saint-Étiennne 2010. Cité du Design Éditions, Saint-Étienne, France, pp. 129–153. ISBN 978-2-912808-40-0
- Anthony Dunne and Fiona Raby, Speculative Everything: Design, Fiction and Social Dreaming, The MIT Press, 2013. ISBN 9780262019842.
- Paola Antonelli, Emma Dexter, Fiona Raby, Iwona Blazwick, Darkitecture: Learning Architecture for the Twenty-First Century Two Little Boys, 2013. ISBN 978-0-957429-90-1
