= Anthony Dunne =

Designer and academic

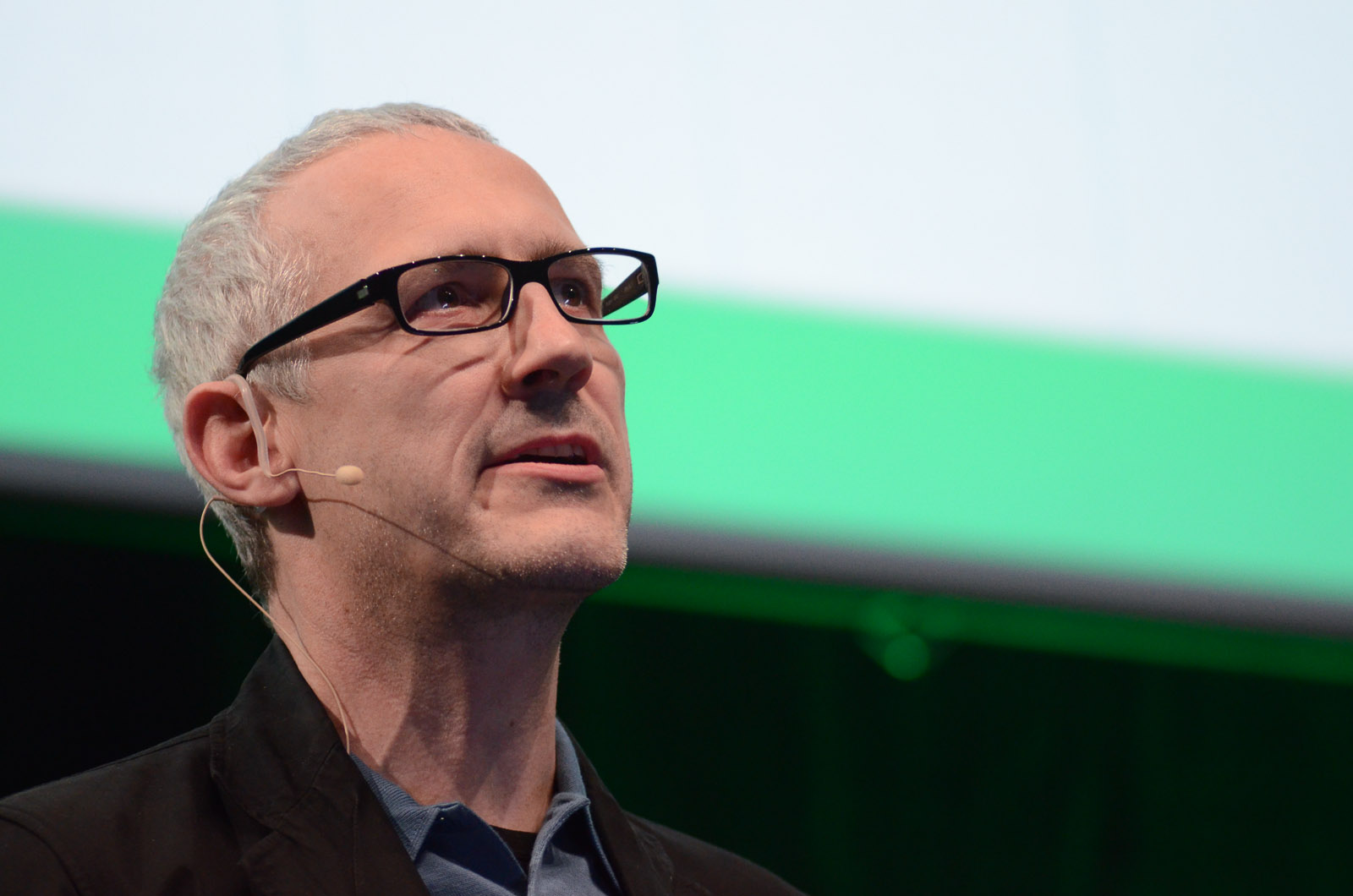
Anthony Dunne, 2013

Anthony Dunne is a critical designer, educator and founder of the art group Dunne and Raby. He runs the studio with his long term partner and collaborator Fiona Raby.

He was a reader at the Royal College of Art Design Interactions department from 2005 - 2015 before leaving and moving to New York to take up professorships in Design and Emerging Technologies at the New School.

== Publications ==
- Anthony Dunne and Fiona Raby, Design Noir: The Secret Life of Electronic Objects, Basel: Birkhäuser, 2001. ISBN 978-3-7643-6566-0
- Anthony Dunne and Fiona Raby, Hertzian Tales: Electronic Products, Aesthetic Experience, and Critical Design, The MIT Press, 1999. ISBN 9780262042321
- Anthony Dunne and Fiona Raby, 'Between Reality and the Impossible' In: Biennale Internationale Design Saint-Étiennne 2010. Cité du Design Éditions, Saint-Étienne, France, pp. 129–153. ISBN 978-2-912808-40-0
- Anthony Dunne and Fiona Raby, Speculative Everything: Design, Fiction and Social Dreaming, The MIT Press, 2013. ISBN 9780262019842.
- Paola Antonelli, Emma Dexter, Fiona Raby, Iwona Blazwick, Darkitecture: Learning Architecture for the Twenty-First Century Two Little Boys, 2013. ISBN 978-0-957429-90-1
