= Mathematics and art =

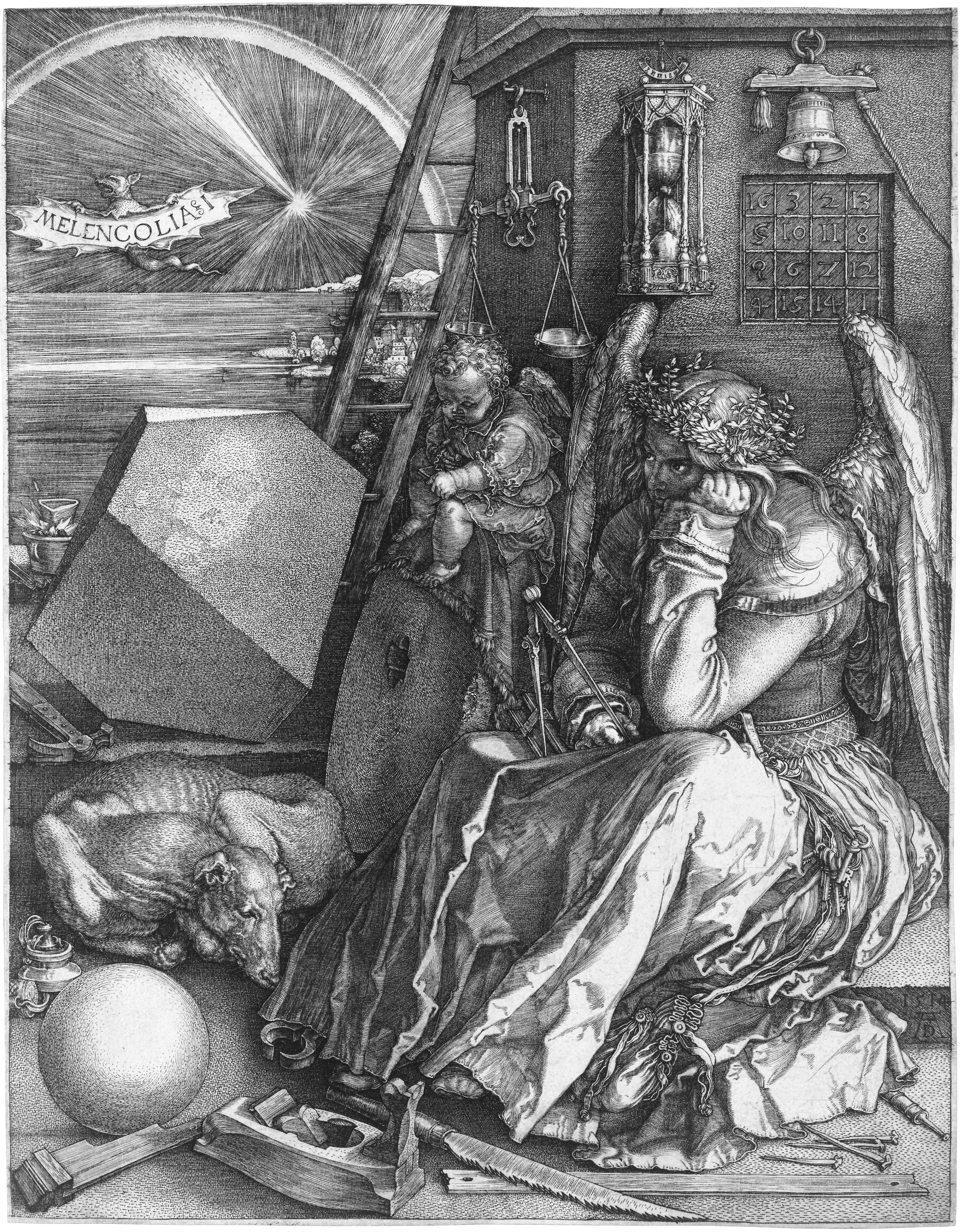
Mathematics in art: Albrecht Dürer's copper plate engraving Melencolia I, 1514. Mathematical references include a compass for geometry, a magic square and a truncated rhombohedron, while measurement is indicated by the scales and hourglass.

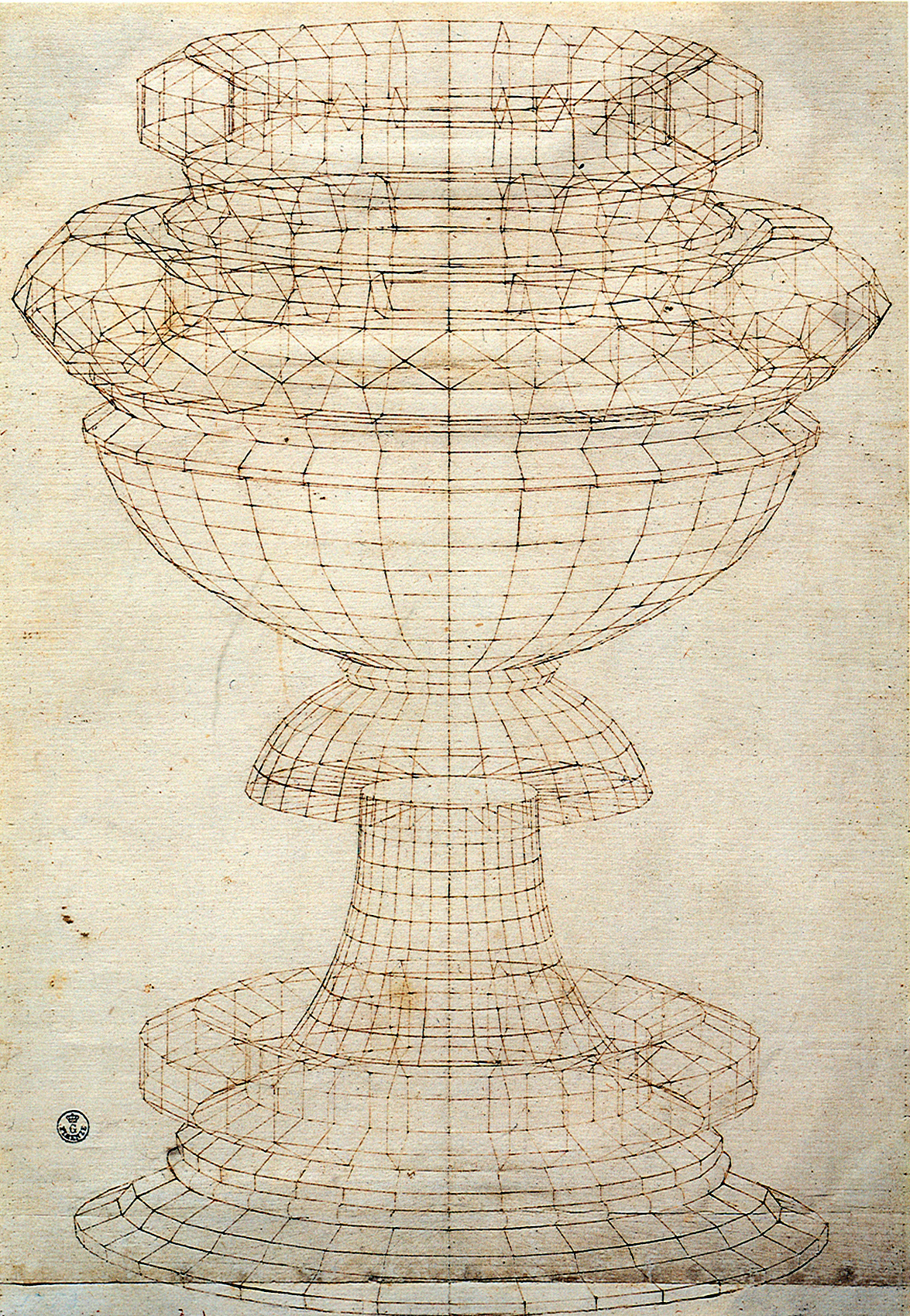
Wireframe drawing of a vase as a solid of revolution by Paolo Uccello, 15th century

Mathematics and art are related in a variety of ways. Mathematics has itself been described as an art motivated by beauty. Mathematics can be discerned in arts such as music, dance, painting, architecture, sculpture, and textiles. This article focuses, however, on mathematics in the visual arts.

Mathematics and art have a long historical relationship. Artists have used mathematics since the 4th century BC when the Greek sculptor Polykleitos wrote his Canon, prescribing proportions conjectured to have been based on the ratio 1:√2 for the ideal male nude. Persistent popular claims have been made for the use of the golden ratio in ancient art and architecture, without reliable evidence. In the Italian Renaissance, Luca Pacioli wrote the influential treatise De divina proportione (1509), illustrated with woodcuts by Leonardo da Vinci, on the use of the golden ratio in art. Another Italian painter, Piero della Francesca, developed Euclid's ideas on perspective in treatises such as De Prospectiva Pingendi, and in his paintings. The engraver Albrecht Dürer made many references to mathematics in his work Melencolia I. In modern times, the graphic artist M. C. Escher made intensive use of tessellation and hyperbolic geometry, with the help of the mathematician H. S. M. Coxeter, while the De Stijl movement led by Theo van Doesburg and Piet Mondrian explicitly embraced geometrical forms. Mathematics has inspired textile arts such as quilting, knitting, cross-stitch, crochet, embroidery, weaving, Turkish and other carpet-making, as well as kilim. In Islamic art, symmetries are evident in forms as varied as Persian girih and Moroccan zellige tilework, Mughal jali pierced stone screens, and widespread muqarnas vaulting.

Mathematics has directly influenced art with conceptual tools such as linear perspective, the analysis of symmetry, and mathematical objects such as polyhedra and the Möbius strip. Magnus Wenninger creates colourful stellated polyhedra, originally as models for teaching. Mathematical concepts such as recursion and logical paradox can be seen in paintings by René Magritte and in engravings by M. C. Escher. Computer art often makes use of fractals including the Mandelbrot set, and sometimes explores other mathematical objects such as cellular automata. Controversially, the artist David Hockney has argued that artists from the Renaissance onwards made use of the camera lucida to draw precise representations of scenes; the architect Philip Steadman similarly argued that Vermeer used the camera obscura in his distinctively observed paintings.

Other relationships include the algorithmic analysis of artworks by X-ray fluorescence spectroscopy, the finding that traditional batiks from different regions of Java have distinct fractal dimensions, and stimuli to mathematics research, especially Filippo Brunelleschi's theory of perspective, which eventually led to Girard Desargues's projective geometry. A persistent view, based ultimately on the Pythagorean notion of harmony in music, holds that everything was arranged by Number, that God is the geometer of the world, and that therefore the world's geometry is sacred.

== Origins: from ancient Greece to the Renaissance ==
=== Polykleitos's Canon and symmetria ===
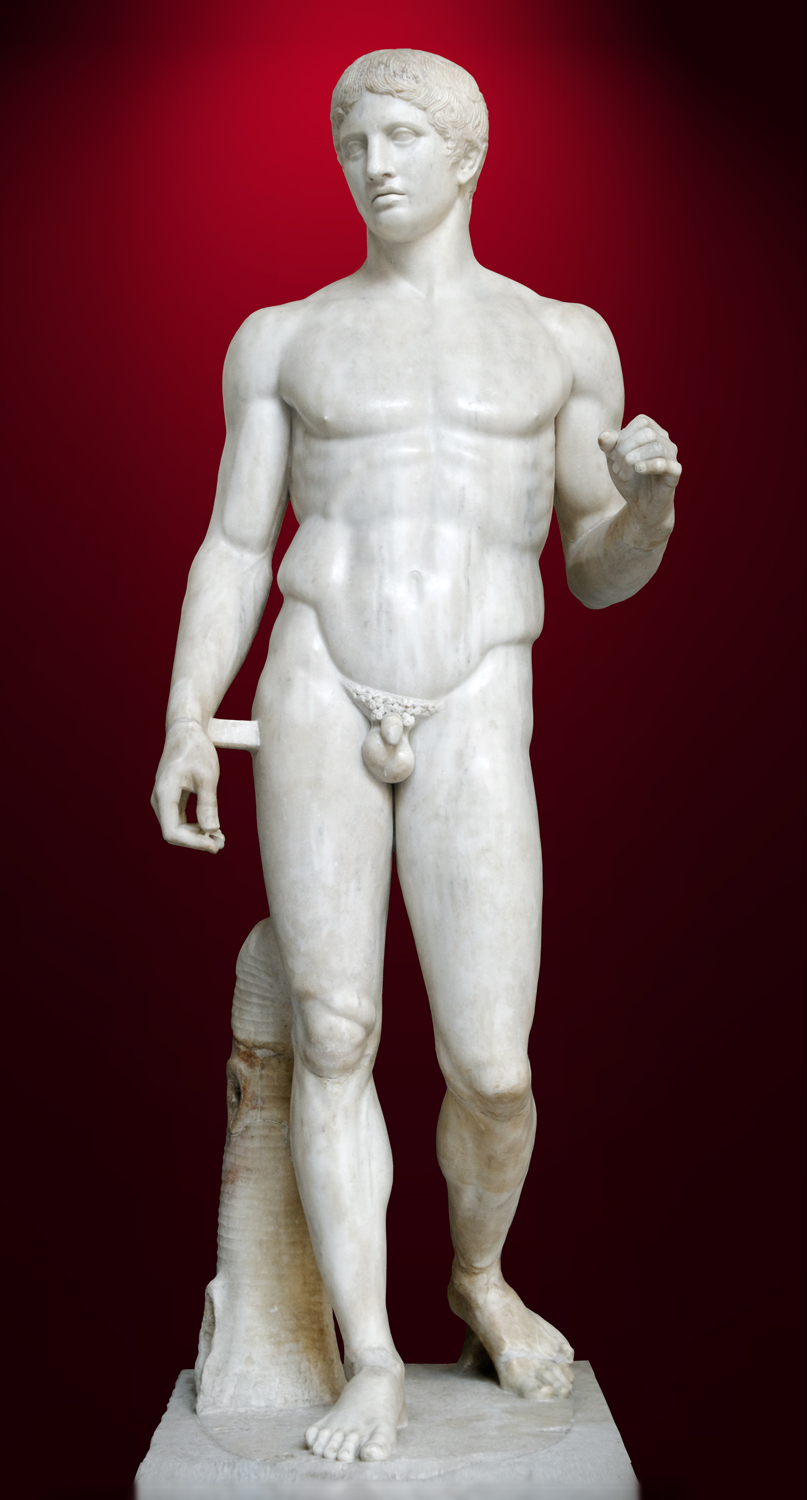
Roman copy in marble of Doryphoros, originally a bronze by Polykleitos

Polykleitos the elder (c. 450–420 BC) was a Greek sculptor from the school of Argos, and a contemporary of Phidias. His works and statues consisted mainly of bronze and were of athletes. According to the philosopher and mathematician Xenocrates, Polykleitos is ranked as one of the most important sculptors of classical antiquity for his work on the Doryphorus and the statue of Hera in the Heraion of Argos. While his sculptures may not be as famous as those of Phidias, they are much admired. In his Canon, a treatise he wrote designed to document the "perfect" body proportions of the male nude, Polykleitos gives us a mathematical approach towards sculpturing the human body.

The Canon itself has been lost but it is conjectured that Polykleitos used a sequence of proportions where each length is that of the diagonal of a square drawn on its predecessor, 1:√2 (about 1:1.4142).

The influence of the Canon of Polykleitos is immense in Classical Greek, Roman, and Renaissance sculpture, with many sculptors following Polykleitos's prescription. While none of Polykleitos's original works survive, Roman copies demonstrate his ideal of physical perfection and mathematical precision. Some scholars argue that Pythagorean thought influenced the Canon of Polykleitos. The Canon applies the basic mathematical concepts of Greek geometry, such as the ratio, proportion, and symmetria (Greek for "harmonious proportions") and turns it into a system capable of describing the human form through a series of continuous geometric progressions.

=== Perspective and proportion ===
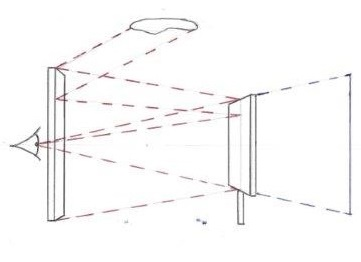
Brunelleschi's experiment with linear perspective

In classical times, rather than making distant figures smaller with linear perspective, painters sized objects and figures according to their thematic importance. In the Middle Ages, some artists used reverse perspective for special emphasis. The Muslim mathematician Alhazen (Ibn al-Haytham) described a theory of optics in his Book of Optics in 1021, but never applied it to art. The Renaissance saw a rebirth of Classical Greek and Roman culture and ideas, among them the study of mathematics to understand nature and the arts. Two major motives drove artists in the late Middle Ages and the Renaissance towards mathematics. First, painters needed to figure out how to depict three-dimensional scenes on a two-dimensional canvas. Second, philosophers and artists alike were convinced that mathematics was the true essence of the physical world and that the entire universe, including the arts, could be explained in geometric terms.

The rudiments of perspective arrived with Giotto (1266/7 – 1337), who attempted to draw in perspective using an algebraic method to determine the placement of distant lines. In 1415, the Italian architect Filippo Brunelleschi and his friend Leon Battista Alberti demonstrated the geometrical method of applying perspective in Florence, using similar triangles as formulated by Euclid, to find the apparent height of distant objects. Brunelleschi's own perspective paintings are lost, but Masaccio's painting of the Holy Trinity shows his principles at work.

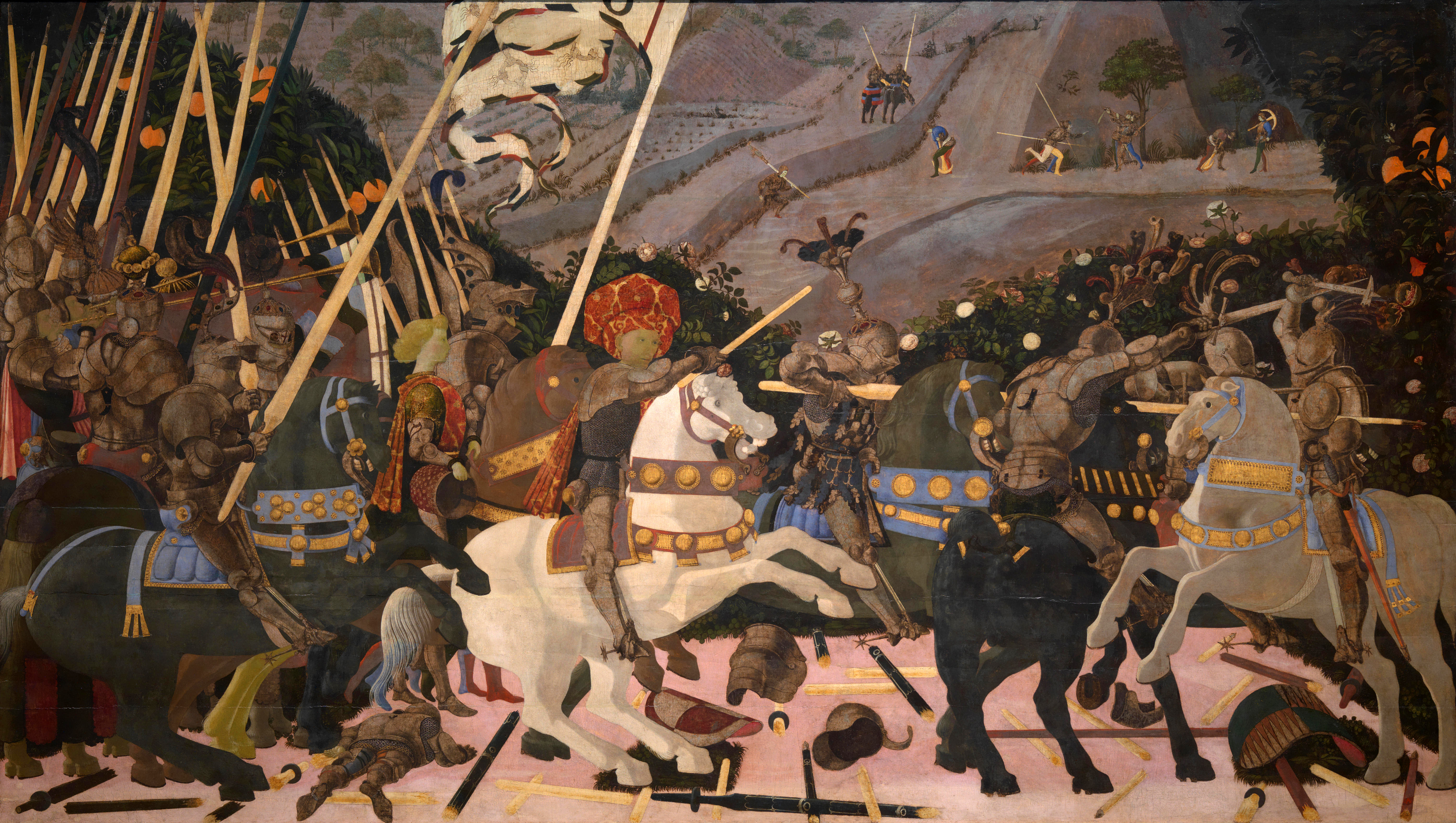
Paolo Uccello made innovative use of perspective in The Battle of San Romano (c. 1435–1460).

The Italian painter Paolo Uccello (1397–1475) was fascinated by perspective, as shown in his paintings of The Battle of San Romano (c. 1435–1460): broken lances lie conveniently along perspective lines.

The painter Piero della Francesca (c. 1415–1492) exemplified this new shift in Italian Renaissance thinking. He was an expert mathematician and geometer, writing books on solid geometry and perspective, including De prospectiva pingendi (On Perspective for Painting), Trattato d'Abaco (Abacus Treatise), and De quinque corporibus regularibus (On the Five Regular Solids). The historian Vasari in his Lives of the Painters calls Piero the "greatest geometer of his time, or perhaps of any time." Piero's interest in perspective can be seen in his paintings including the Polyptych of Perugia, the San Agostino altarpiece and The Flagellation of Christ. His work on geometry influenced later mathematicians and artists including Luca Pacioli in his De divina proportione and Leonardo da Vinci. Piero studied classical mathematics and the works of Archimedes. He was taught commercial arithmetic in "abacus schools"; his writings are formatted like abacus school textbooks, perhaps including Leonardo Pisano (Fibonacci)'s 1202 Liber Abaci. Linear perspective was just being introduced into the artistic world. Alberti explained in his 1435 De pictura: "light rays travel in straight lines from points in the observed scene to the eye, forming a kind of pyramid with the eye as vertex." A painting constructed with linear perspective is a cross-section of that pyramid.

In De Prospectiva Pingendi, Piero transforms his empirical observations of the way aspects of a figure change with point of view into mathematical proofs. His treatise starts in the vein of Euclid: he defines the point as "the tiniest thing that is possible for the eye to comprehend". (Note: In Piero's Italian: "una cosa tanto picholina quanto e possible ad ochio comprendere".) He uses deductive logic to lead the reader to the perspective representation of a three-dimensional body.

The artist David Hockney argued in his book Secret Knowledge: Rediscovering the Lost Techniques of the Old Masters that artists started using a camera lucida from the 1420s, resulting in a sudden change in precision and realism, and that this practice was continued by major artists including Ingres, Van Eyck, and Caravaggio. Critics disagree on whether Hockney was correct. Similarly, the architect Philip Steadman argued controversially that Vermeer had used a different device, the camera obscura, to help him create his distinctively observed paintings.

In 1509, Luca Pacioli (c. 1447–1517) published De divina proportione on mathematical and artistic proportion, including in the human face. Leonardo da Vinci (1452–1519) illustrated the text with woodcuts of regular solids while he studied under Pacioli in the 1490s. Leonardo's drawings are probably the first illustrations of skeletonic solids. These, such as the rhombicuboctahedron, were among the first to be drawn to demonstrate perspective by being overlaid on top of each other. The work discusses perspective in the works of Piero della Francesca, Melozzo da Forlì, and Marco Palmezzano. Leonardo studied Pacioli's Summa, from which he copied tables of proportions. In Mona Lisa and The Last Supper, Leonardo's work incorporated linear perspective with a vanishing point to provide apparent depth. The Last Supper is constructed in a tight ratio of 12:6:4:3, as is Raphael's The School of Athens, which includes Pythagoras with a tablet of ideal ratios, sacred to the Pythagoreans. In Vitruvian Man, Leonardo expressed the ideas of the Roman architect Vitruvius, innovatively showing the male figure twice, and centring him in both a circle and a square.

As early as the 15th century, curvilinear perspective found its way into paintings by artists interested in image distortions. Jan van Eyck's 1434 Arnolfini Portrait contains a convex mirror with reflections of the people in the scene, while Parmigianino's Self-portrait in a Convex Mirror, c. 1523–1524, shows the artist's largely undistorted face at the centre, with a strongly curved background and artist's hand around the edge.

Three-dimensional space can be represented convincingly in art, as in technical drawing, by means other than perspective. Oblique projections, including cavalier perspective (used by French military artists to depict fortifications in the 18th century), were used continuously and ubiquitously by Chinese artists from the first or second centuries until the 18th century. The Chinese acquired the technique from India, which acquired it from Ancient Rome. Oblique projection is seen in Japanese art, such as in the Ukiyo-e paintings of Torii Kiyonaga (1752–1815).

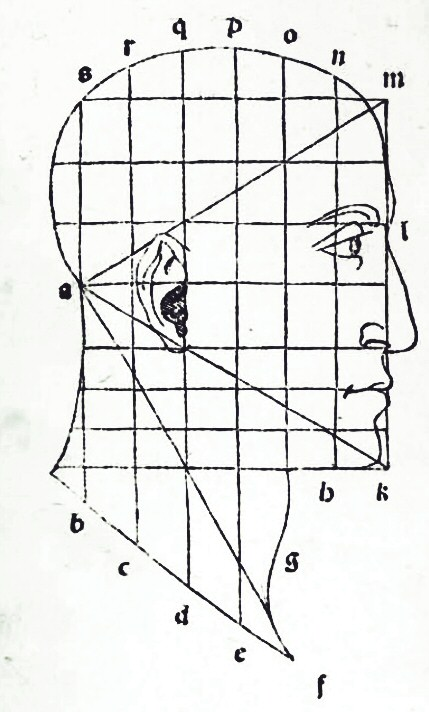
Woodcut from Luca Pacioli's 1509 De divina proportione with an equilateral triangle on a human face

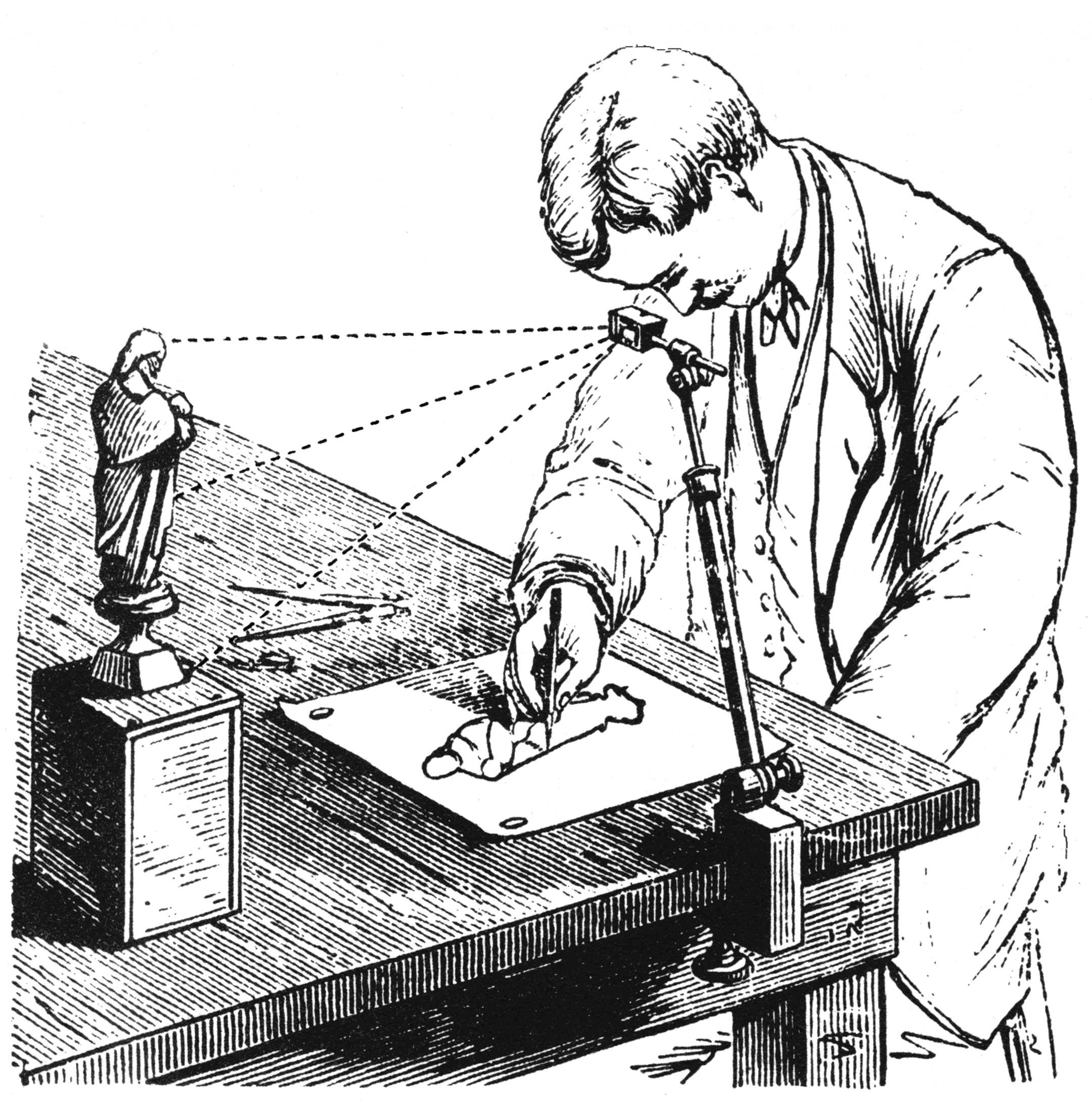
Camera lucida in use. Scientific American, 1879

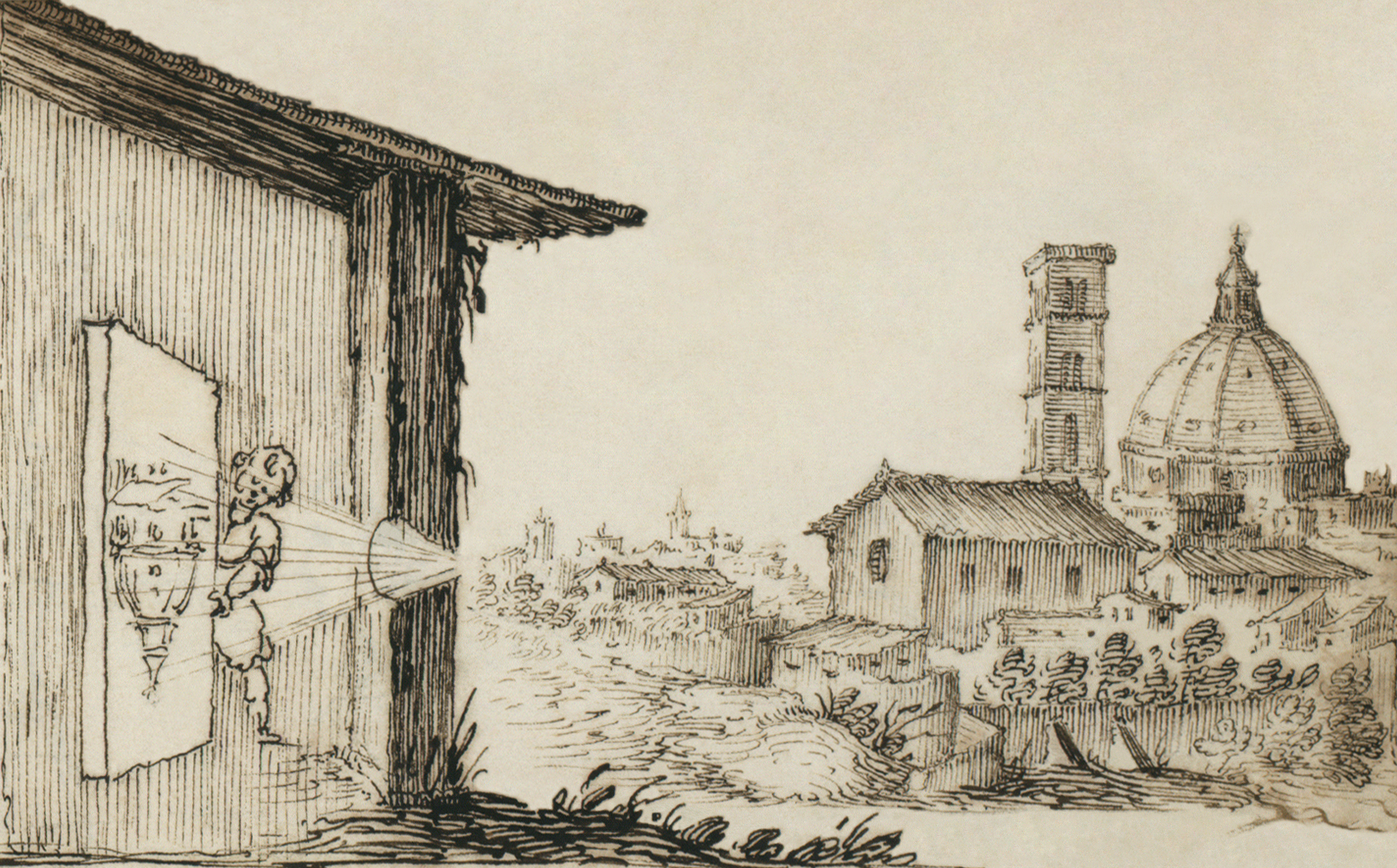
Illustration of an artist using a camera obscura, 17th century

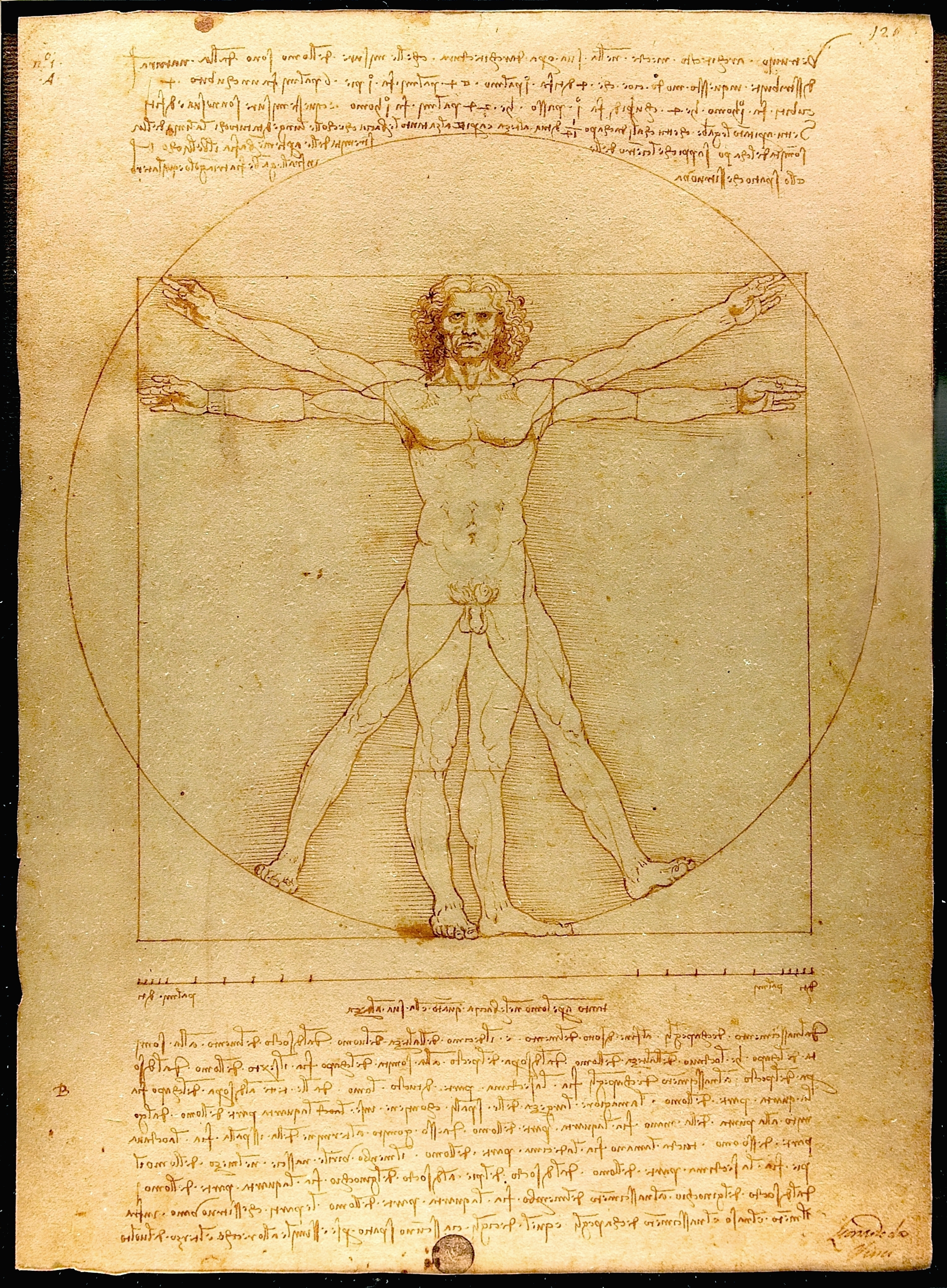
Proportion: Leonardo's Vitruvian Man, c. 1490

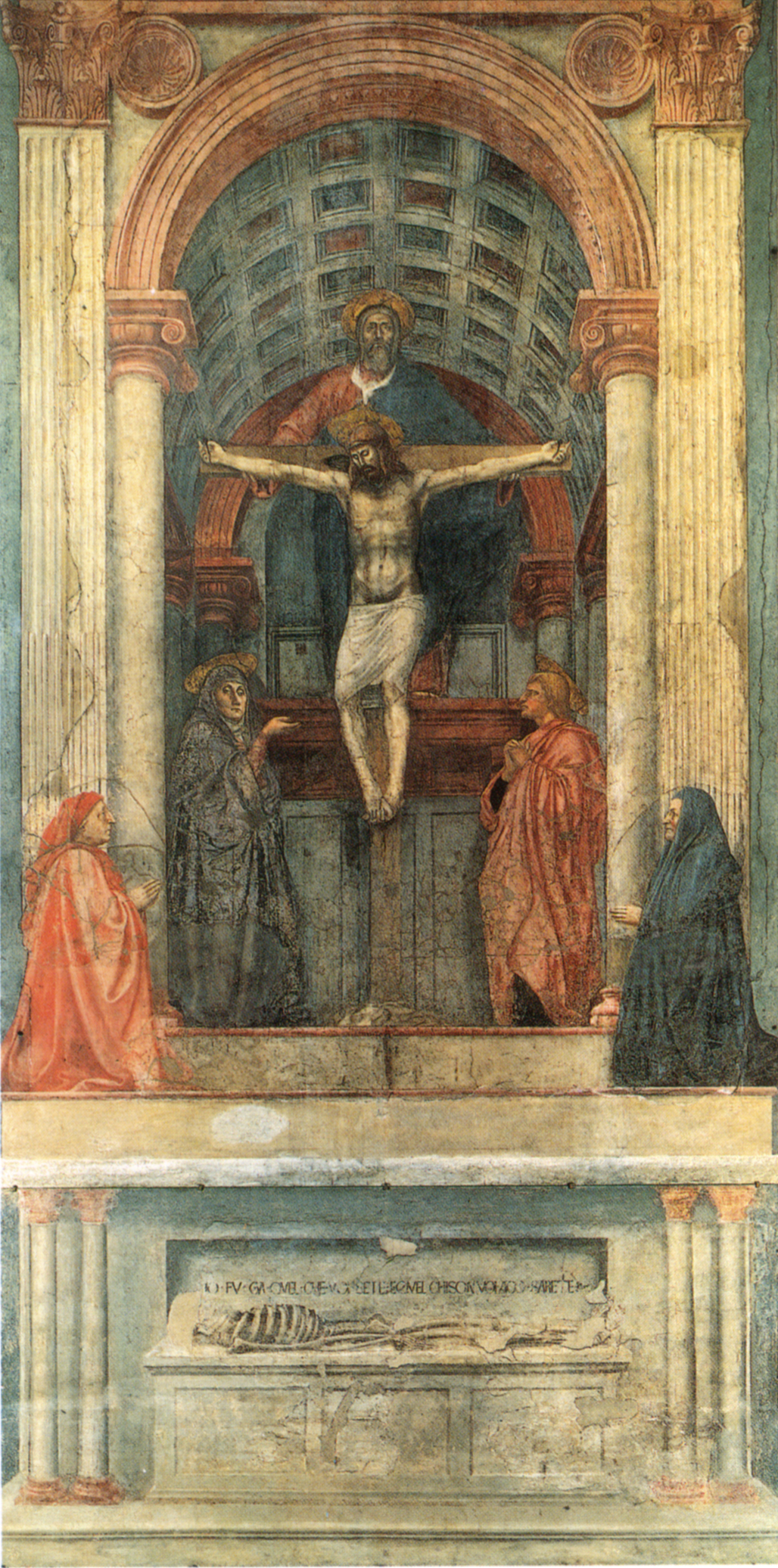
Brunelleschi's theory of perspective: Masaccio's Trinità, c. 1426–1428, in the Basilica of Santa Maria Novella

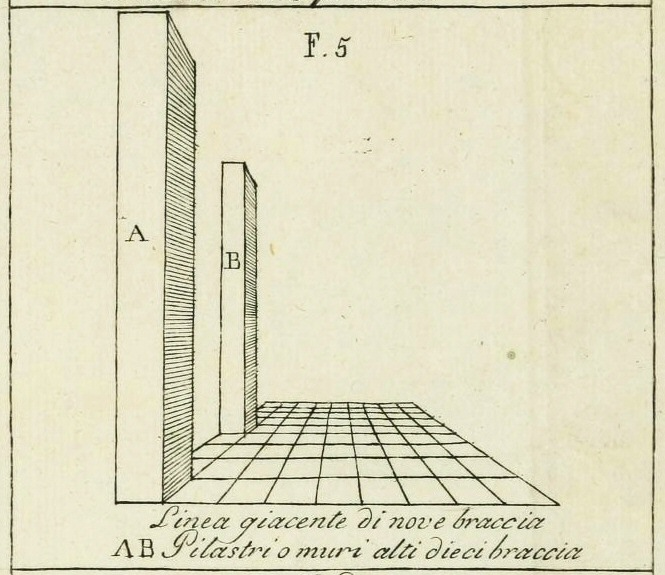
Diagram from Leon Battista Alberti's 1435 Della Pittura, with pillars in perspective on a grid

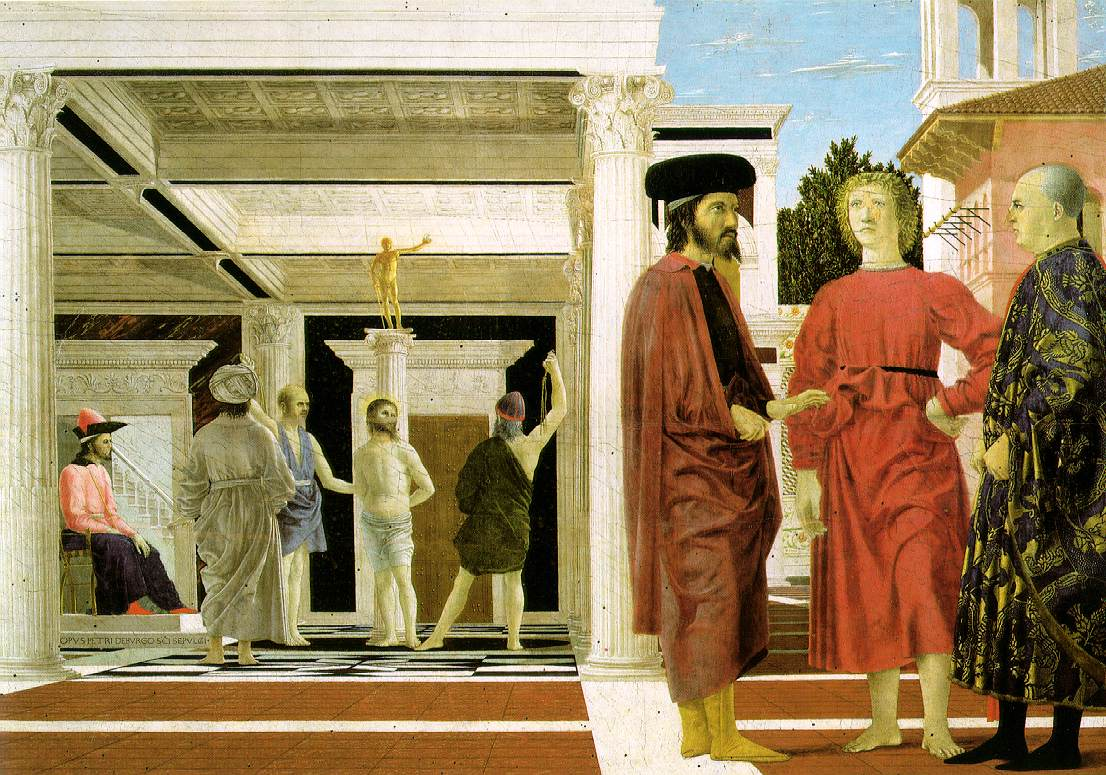
Linear perspective in Piero della Francesca's Flagellation of Christ, c. 1455–1460

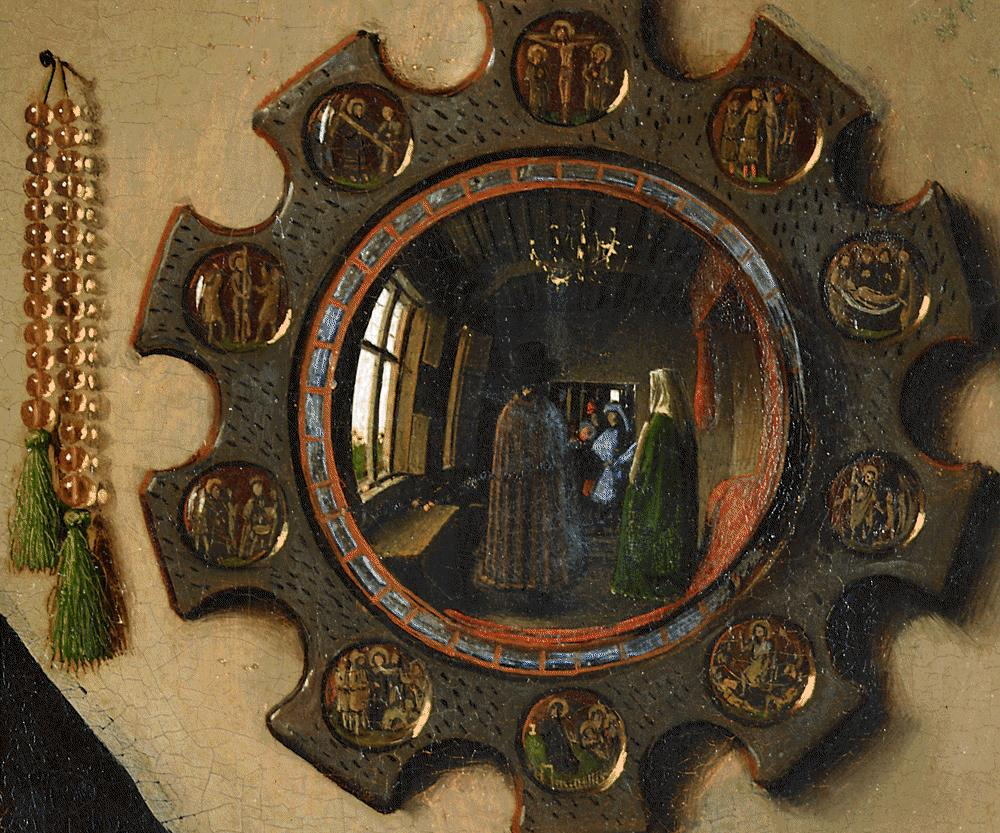
Curvilinear perspective: convex mirror in Jan van Eyck's Arnolfini Portrait, 1434

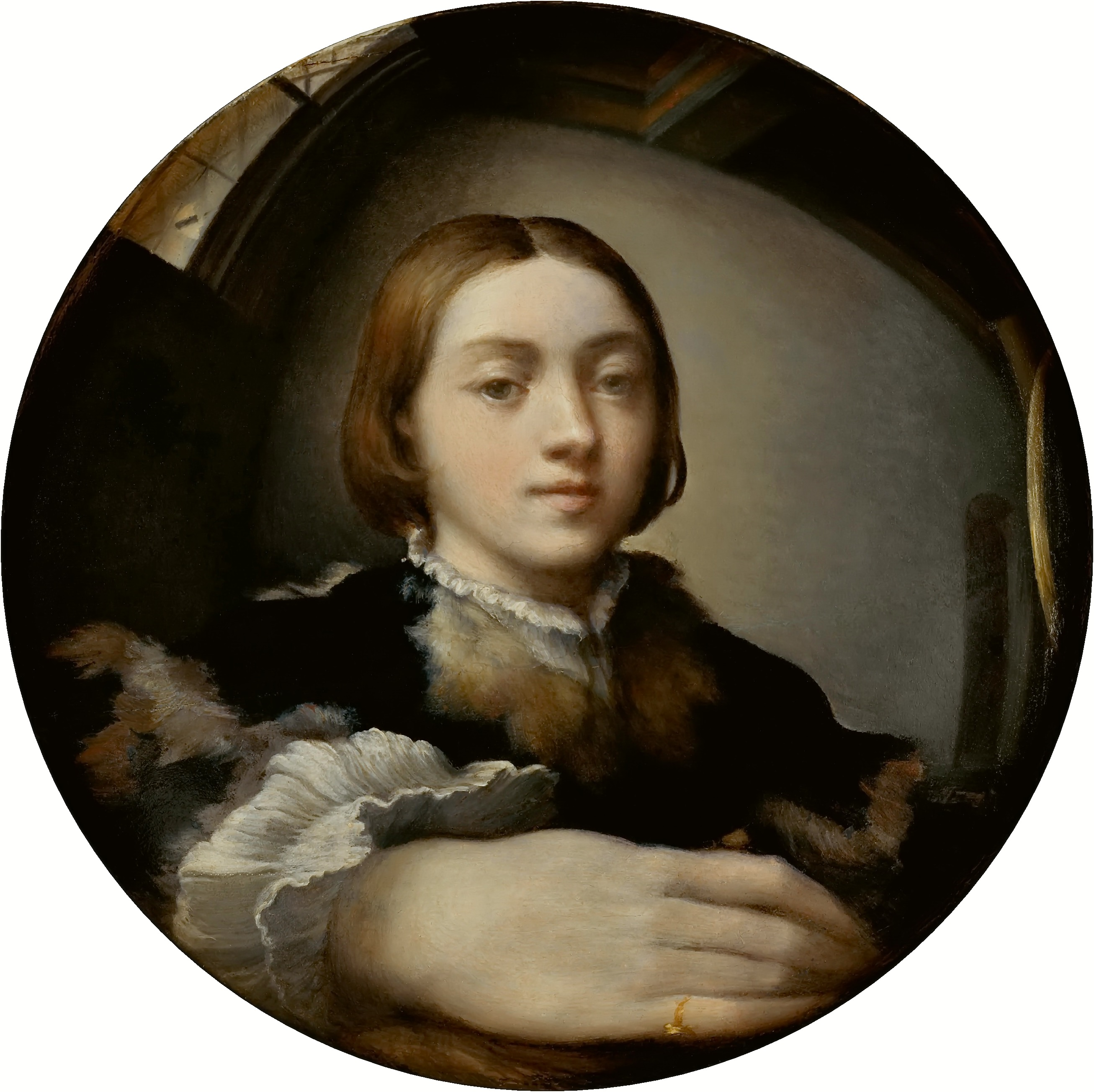
Parmigianino, Self-portrait in a Convex Mirror, c. 1523–1524

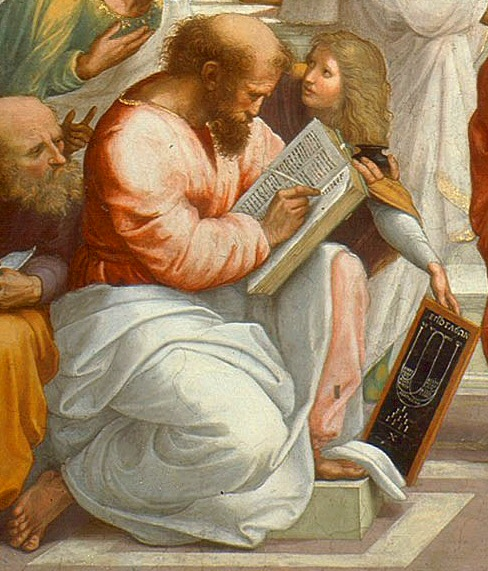
Pythagoras with tablet of ratios, in Raphael's The School of Athens, 1509

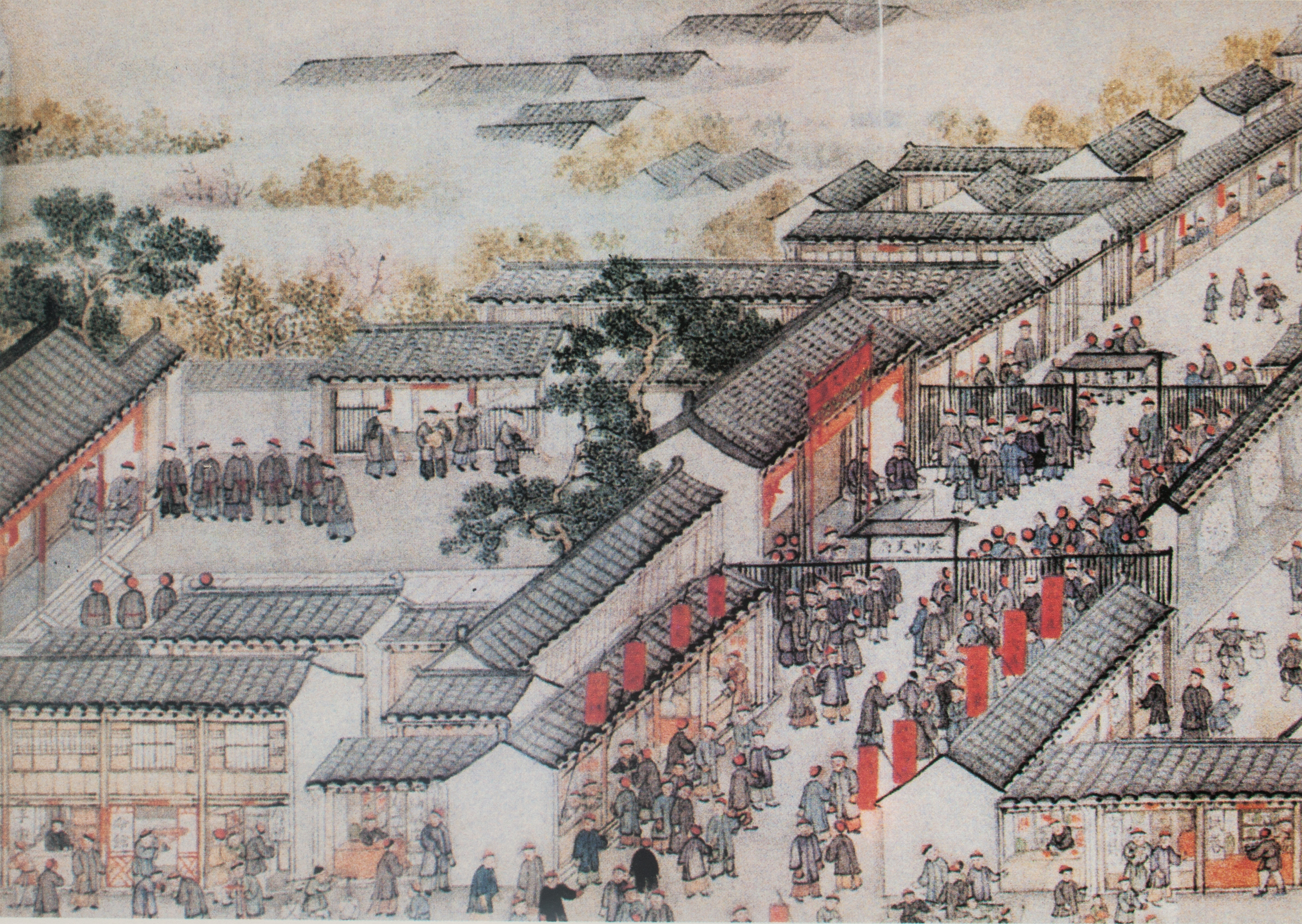
Oblique projection: Entrance and yard of a yamen. Detail of scroll about Suzhou by Xu Yang, ordered by the Qianlong Emperor. 18th century

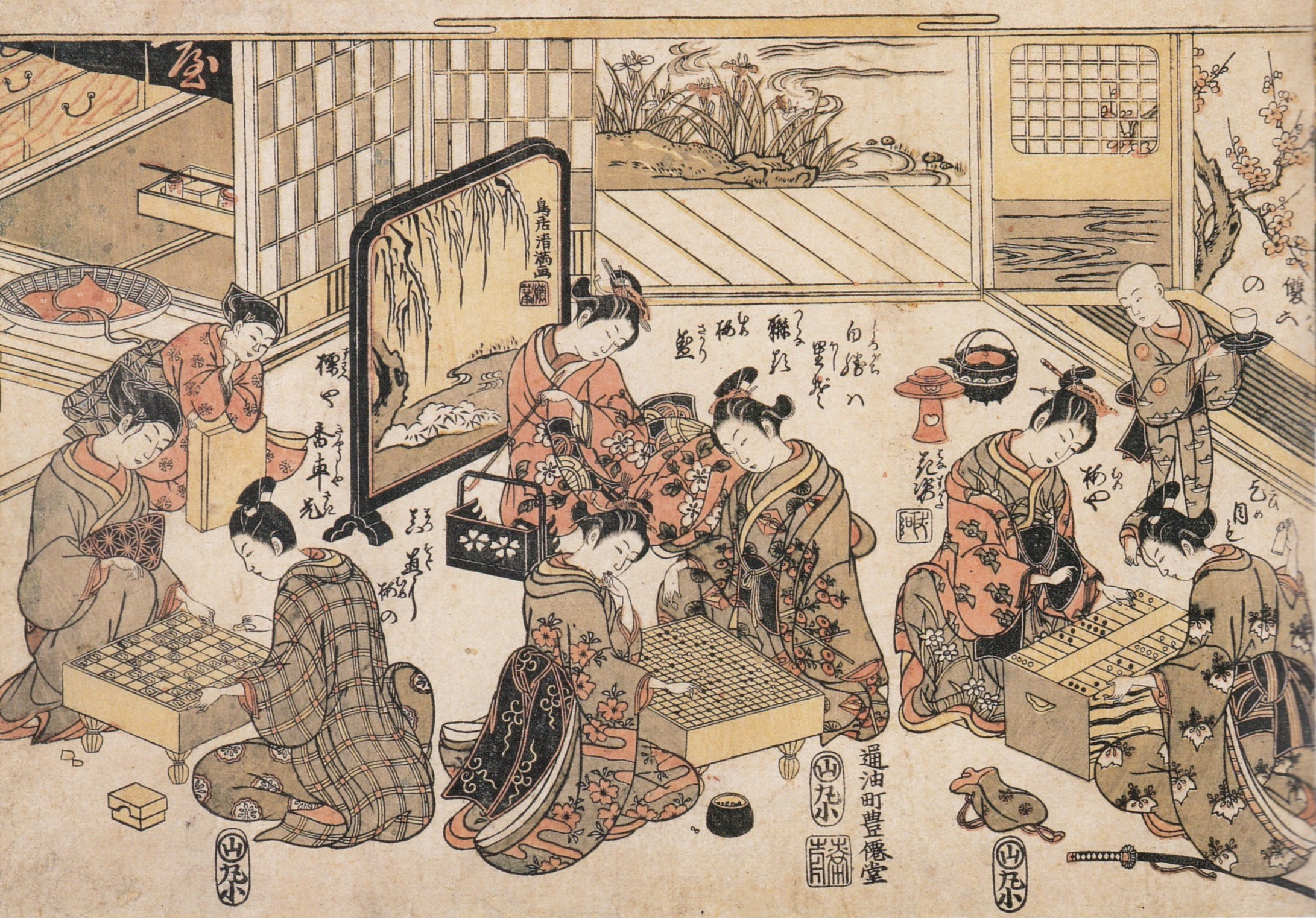
Oblique projection: women playing Shogi, Go and Ban-sugoroku board games. Painting by Torii Kiyonaga, Japan, c. 1780

=== Golden ratio ===
The golden ratio (roughly equal to 1.618) was known to Euclid. The golden ratio has persistently been claimed in modern times to have been used in art and architecture by the ancients in Egypt, Greece and elsewhere, without reliable evidence. The claim may derive from confusion with "golden mean", which to the Ancient Greeks meant "avoidance of excess in either direction", not a ratio. Pyramidologists since the 19th century have argued on dubious mathematical grounds for the golden ratio in pyramid design. (Note: The ratio of the slant height to half the base length is 1.619, less than 1% from the golden ratio, suggesting the use of the Kepler triangle (face angle 51°49'). However, other ratios are within measurement error of the same shape, and historical evidence suggests that simple integer ratios are more likely to have been used.) The Parthenon, a 5th-century BC temple in Athens, has been claimed to use the golden ratio in its façade and floor plan, but these claims too are disproved by measurement. The Great Mosque of Kairouan in Tunisia has similarly been claimed to use the golden ratio in its design, but the ratio does not appear in the original parts of the mosque. The historian of architecture Frederik Macody Lund argued in 1919 that the Cathedral of Chartres (12th century), Notre-Dame of Laon (1157–1205) and Notre Dame de Paris (1160) are designed according to the golden ratio, drawing regulator lines to make his case. Other scholars argue that until Pacioli's work in 1509, the golden ratio was unknown to artists and architects. For example, the height and width of the front of Notre-Dame of Laon have the ratio 8/5 or 1.6, not 1.618. Such Fibonacci ratios quickly become hard to distinguish from the golden ratio. After Pacioli, the golden ratio is more definitely discernible in artworks including Leonardo's Mona Lisa.

Another ratio, the only other morphic number, was named the plastic number (Note: 'Plastic' named the ability to take on a chosen three-dimensional shape.) in 1928 by the Dutch architect Hans van der Laan (originally named le nombre radiant in French). Its value is the solution of the cubic equation

$$x^3=x+1\,$$,

an irrational number which is approximately 1.325. According to the architect Richard Padovan, this has characteristic ratios 3/4 and 1/7, which govern the limits of human perception in relating one physical size to another. Van der Laan used these ratios when designing the 1967 St. Benedictusberg Abbey church in the Netherlands.

Base:hypotenuse(b:a) ratios for the Pyramid of Khufu could be: 1:φ (Kepler triangle), 3:5 (3-4-5 Triangle), or 1:4/π

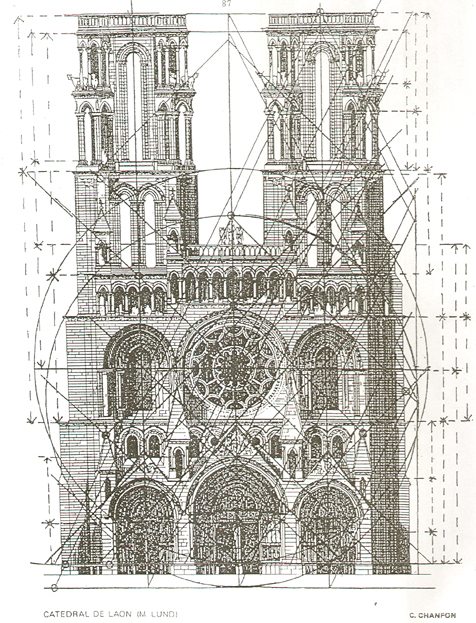
Supposed ratios: Notre-Dame of Laon

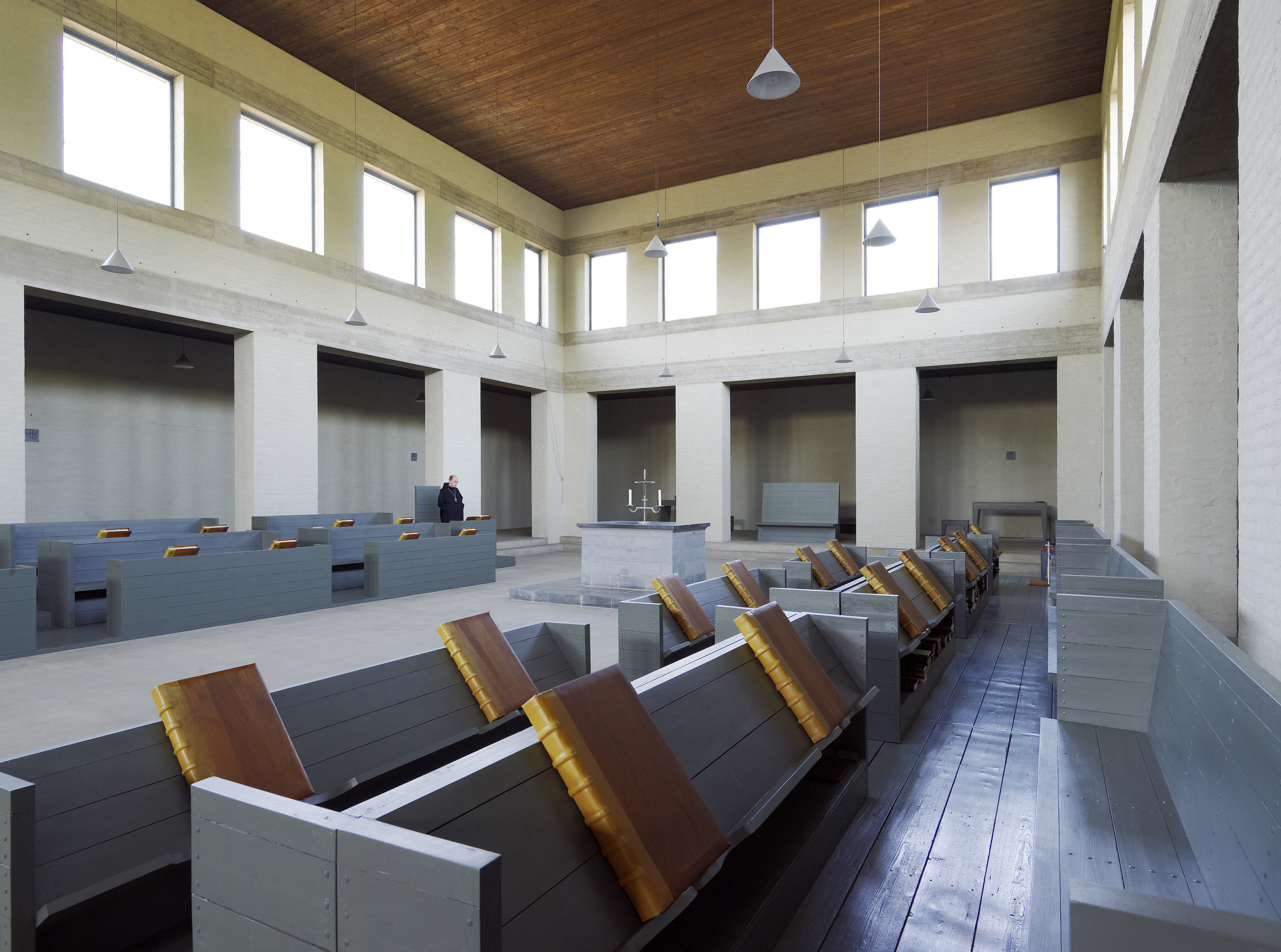
The 1967 St. Benedictusberg Abbey church by Hans van der Laan has plastic ratio proportions.

Golden triangles, rectangles and the golden spiral superimposed on the Mona Lisa

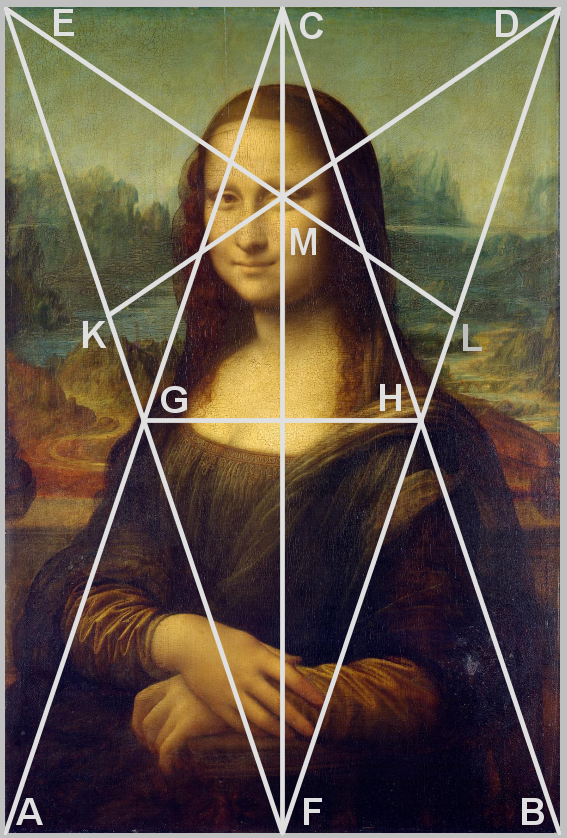
Figure 1: Golden triangles

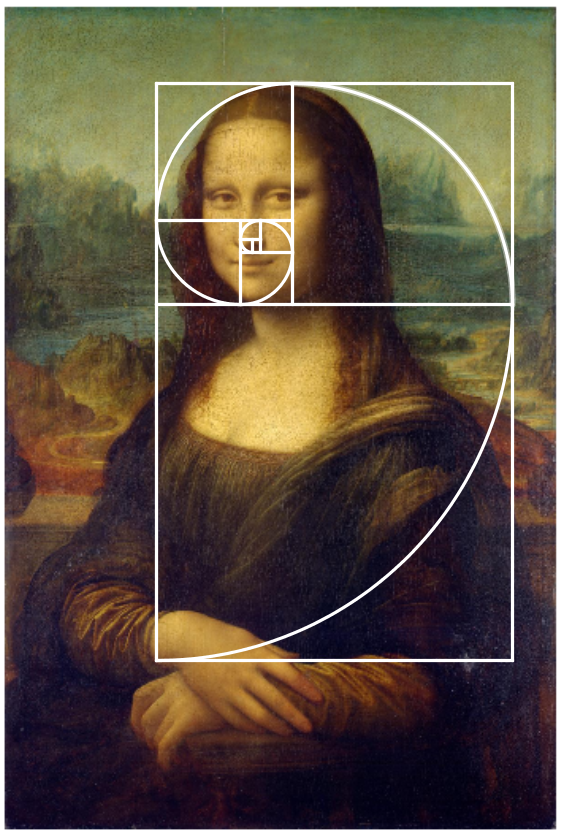
Figure 2: Golden rectangles with Golden spiral

A famous example is the painting Mona Lisa by Leonardo da Vinci. It exhibits characteristics of the golden ratio and reveals several golden triangles, golden rectangles, and the golden spiral.

In Figure 1, point $\mathrm{M}$ (Mona Lisa's left eye) divides the line segments $\mathrm{\overline{DK}}$ and $\mathrm{\overline{EL}}$ according to the golden ratio. The triangles $\mathrm{ABC}, \mathrm{DEF}, \mathrm{AFG}, \mathrm{FBH}, \mathrm{HGF}$ and $\mathrm{GHC}$ are golden triangles, because in each of these six triangles, the base and the legs stand in the ratio of the golden ratio to one another.

Figure 2 shows golden rectangles and the golden spiral. The golden spiral is positioned so that it begins at the left wrist and touches the top of the head. The tip of the nose then forms the point towards which the spiral converges.

=== Planar symmetries ===
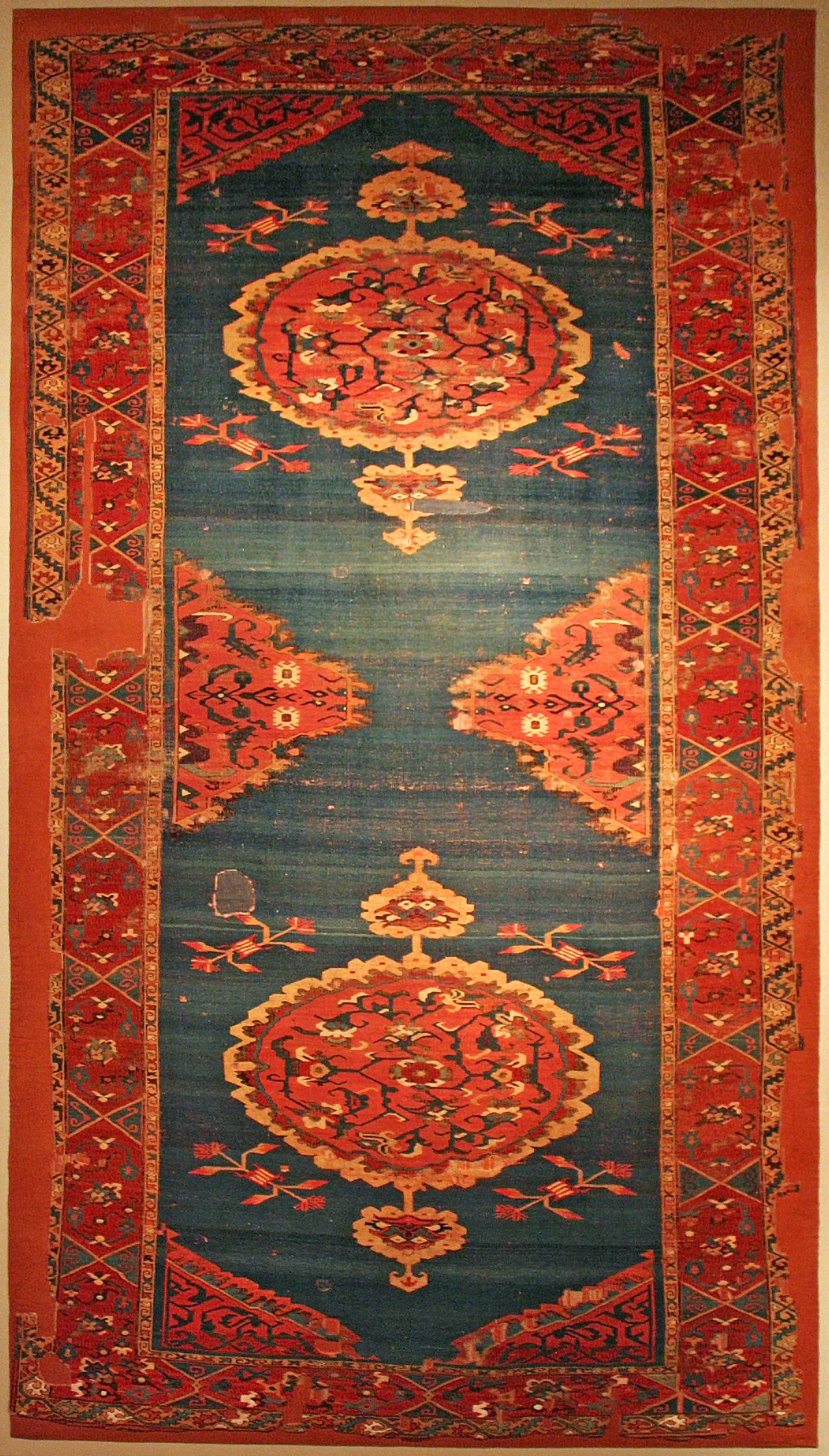
Powerful presence: carpet with double medallion. Central Anatolia (Konya – Karapınar), circa 1600. Alâeddin Mosque

Planar symmetries have for millennia been exploited in artworks such as carpets, lattices, textiles and tilings.

Many traditional rugs, whether pile carpets or flatweave kilims, are divided into a central field and a framing border; both can have symmetries, though in handwoven carpets these are often slightly broken by small details, variations of pattern and shifts in colour introduced by the weaver. In kilims from Anatolia, the motifs used are themselves usually symmetrical. The general layout, too, is usually present, with arrangements such as stripes, stripes alternating with rows of motifs, and packed arrays of roughly hexagonal motifs. The field is commonly laid out as a wallpaper with a wallpaper group such as pmm, while the border may be laid out as a frieze of frieze group pm11, pmm2 or pma2. Turkish and Central Asian kilims often have three or more borders in different frieze groups. Weavers certainly had the intention of symmetry, without explicit knowledge of its mathematics. The mathematician and architectural theorist Nikos Salingaros suggests that the "powerful presence" (aesthetic effect) of a "great carpet" such as the best Konya two-medallion carpets of the 17th century is created by mathematical techniques related to the theories of the architect Christopher Alexander. These techniques include making opposites couple; opposing colour values; differentiating areas geometrically, whether by using complementary shapes or balancing the directionality of sharp angles; providing small-scale complexity (from the knot level upwards) and both small- and large-scale symmetry; repeating elements at a hierarchy of different scales (with a ratio of about 2.7 from each level to the next). Salingaros argues that "all successful carpets satisfy at least nine of the above ten rules", and suggests that it might be possible to create a metric from these rules.

Elaborate lattices are found in Indian Jali work, carved in marble to adorn tombs and palaces. Chinese lattices, always with some symmetry, exist in 14 of the 17 wallpaper groups; they often have mirror, double mirror, or rotational symmetry. Some have a central medallion, and some have a border in a frieze group. Many Chinese lattices have been analysed mathematically by Daniel S. Dye; he identifies Sichuan as the centre of the craft.

Girih tiles

Symmetries are prominent in textile arts including quilting, knitting, cross-stitch, crochet, embroidery and weaving, where they may be purely decorative or may be marks of status. Rotational symmetry is found in circular structures such as domes; these are sometimes elaborately decorated with symmetric patterns inside and out, as at the 1619 Sheikh Lotfollah Mosque in Isfahan. Items of embroidery and lace work such as tablecloths and table mats, made using bobbins or by tatting, can have a wide variety of reflectional and rotational symmetries which are being explored mathematically.

Islamic art exploits symmetries in many of its artforms, notably in girih tilings. These are formed using a set of five tile shapes, namely a regular decagon, an elongated hexagon, a bow tie, a rhombus, and a regular pentagon. All the sides of these tiles have the same length; and all their angles are multiples of 36° (π/5 radians), offering fivefold and tenfold symmetries. The tiles are decorated with strapwork lines (girih), generally more visible than the tile boundaries. In 2007, the physicists Peter Lu and Paul Steinhardt argued that girih resembled quasicrystalline Penrose tilings. Elaborate geometric zellige tilework is a distinctive element in Moroccan architecture. Muqarnas vaults are three-dimensional but were designed in two dimensions with drawings of geometrical cells.

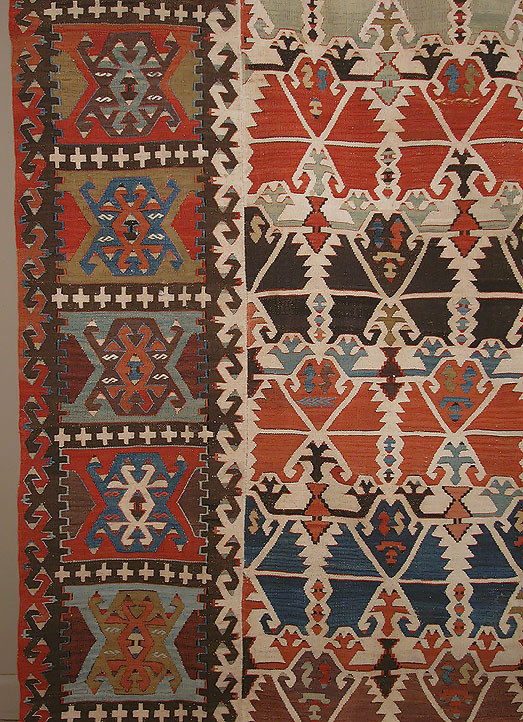
Hotamis kilim (detail), central Anatolia, early 19th century

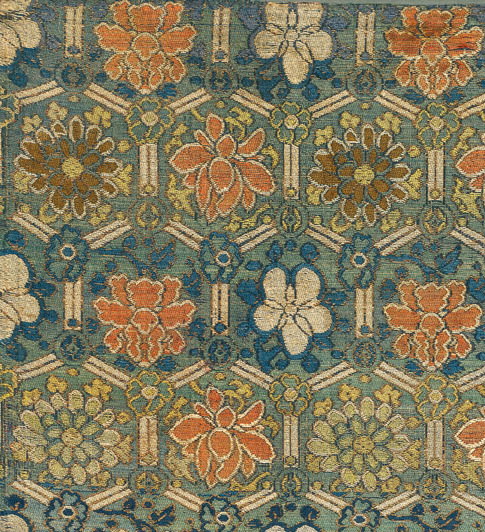
Detail of a Ming Dynasty brocade, using a chamfered hexagonal lattice pattern

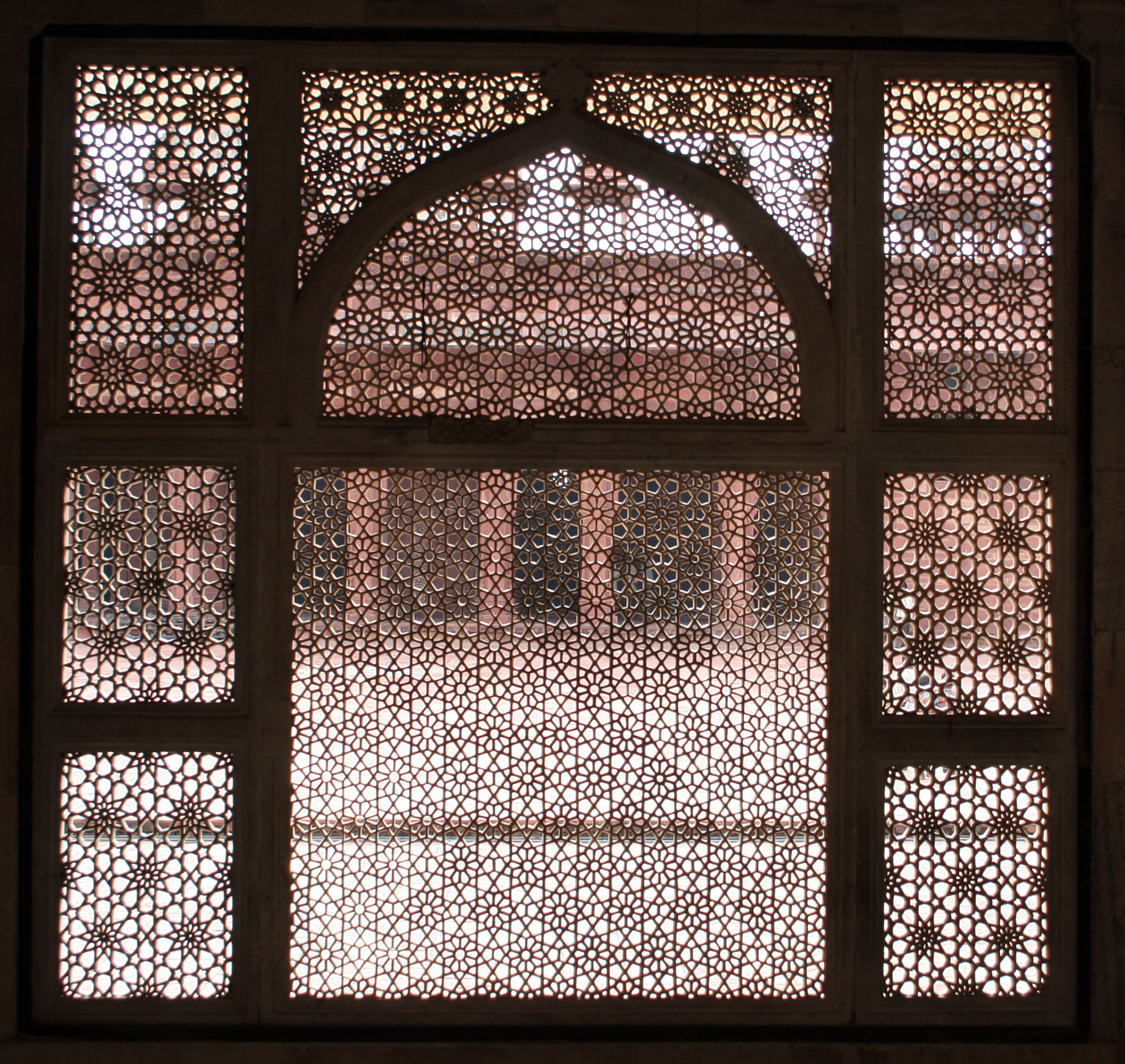
Jaali marble lattice at tomb of Salim Chishti, Fatehpur Sikri, India

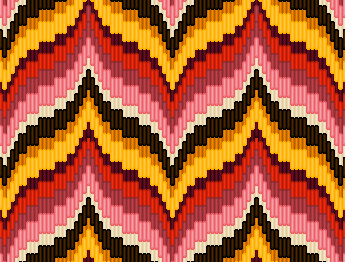
Symmetries: Florentine Bargello pattern tapestry work

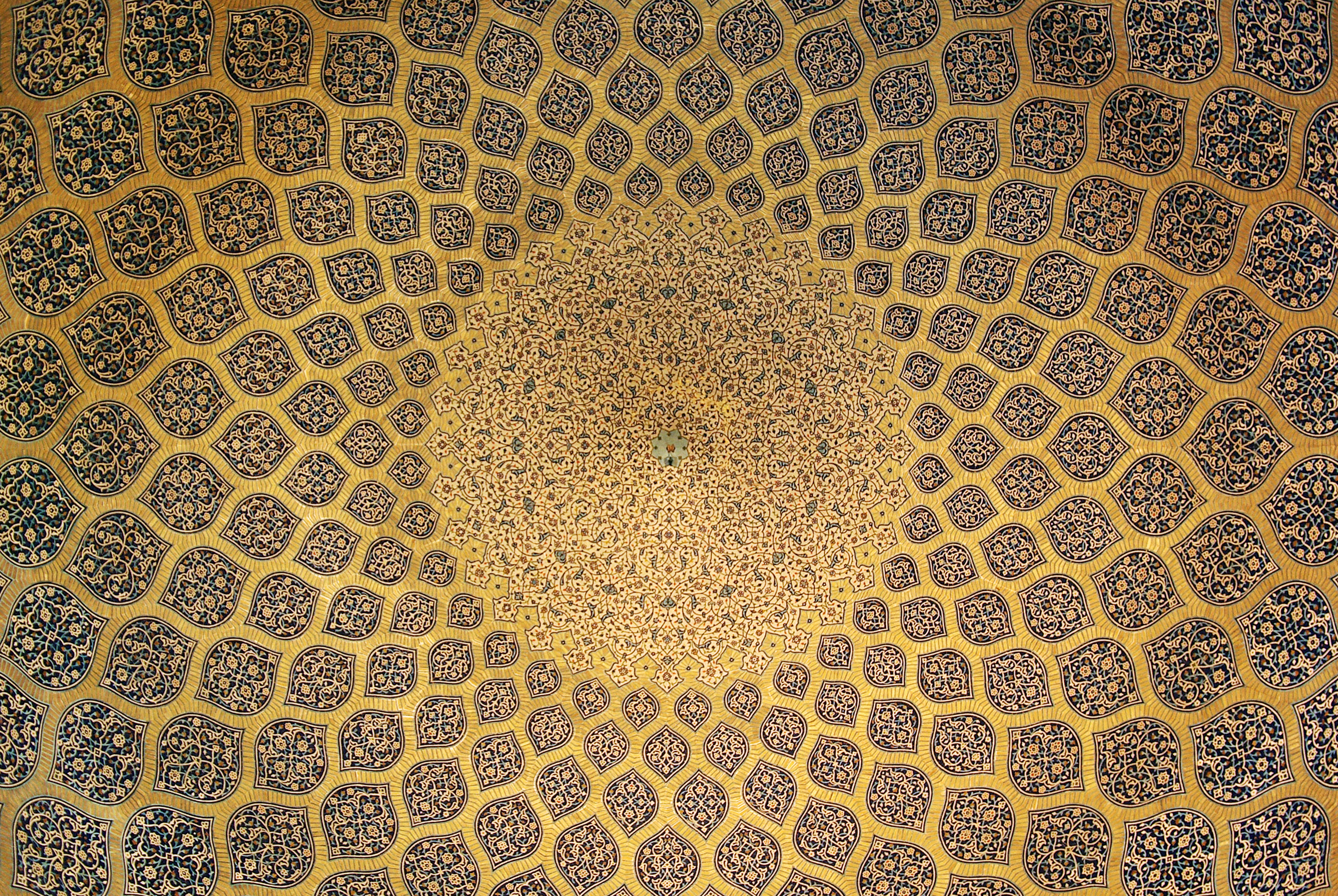
Ceiling of the Sheikh Lotfollah Mosque, Isfahan, 1619

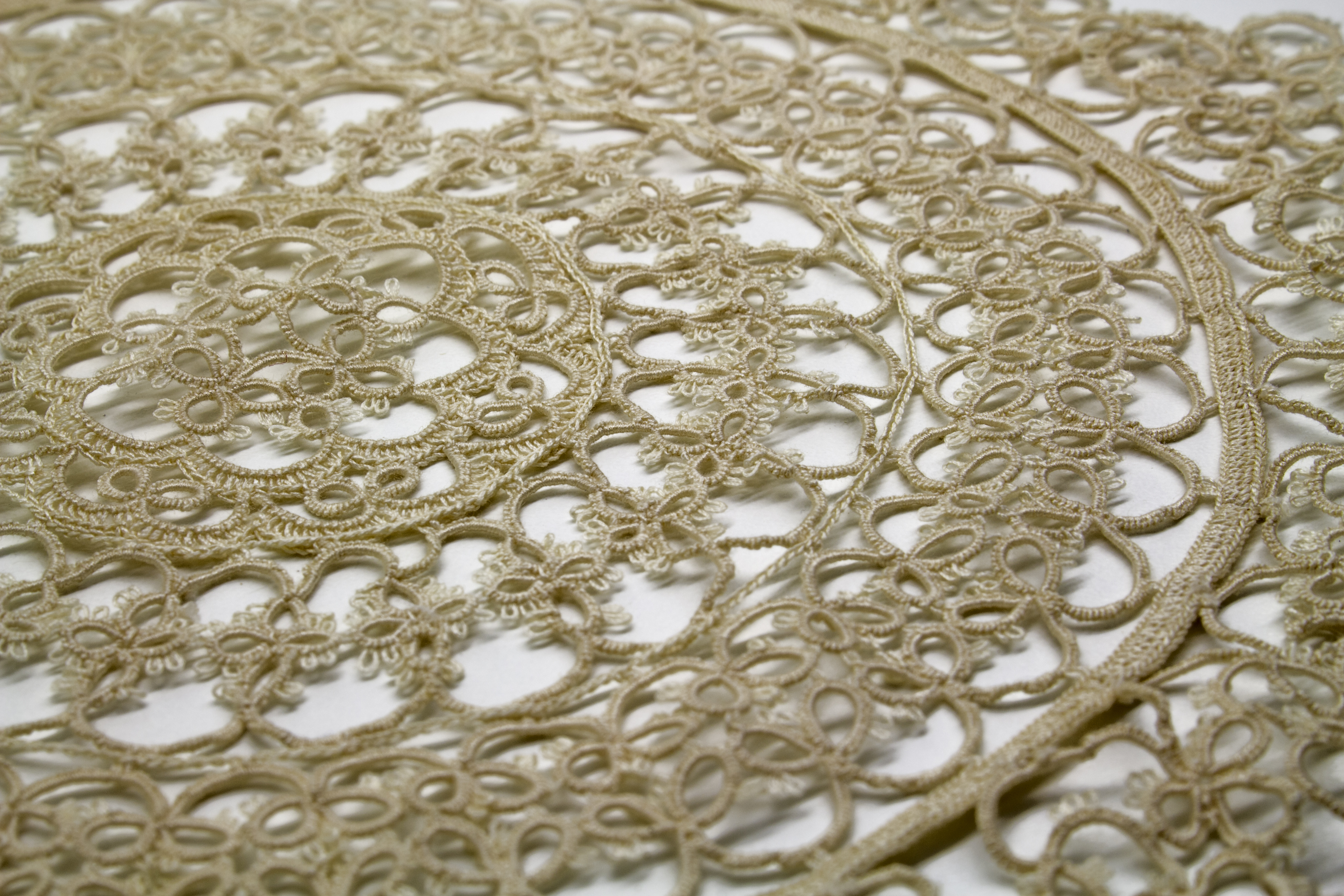
Rotational symmetry in lace: tatting work

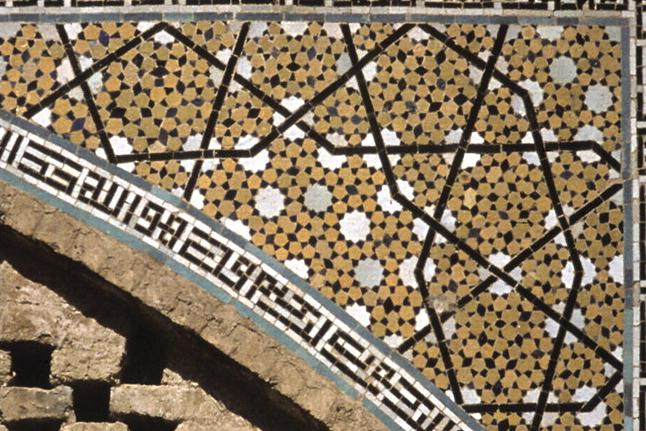
Girih tiles: patterns at large and small scales on a spandrel from the Darb-i Imam shrine, Isfahan, 1453

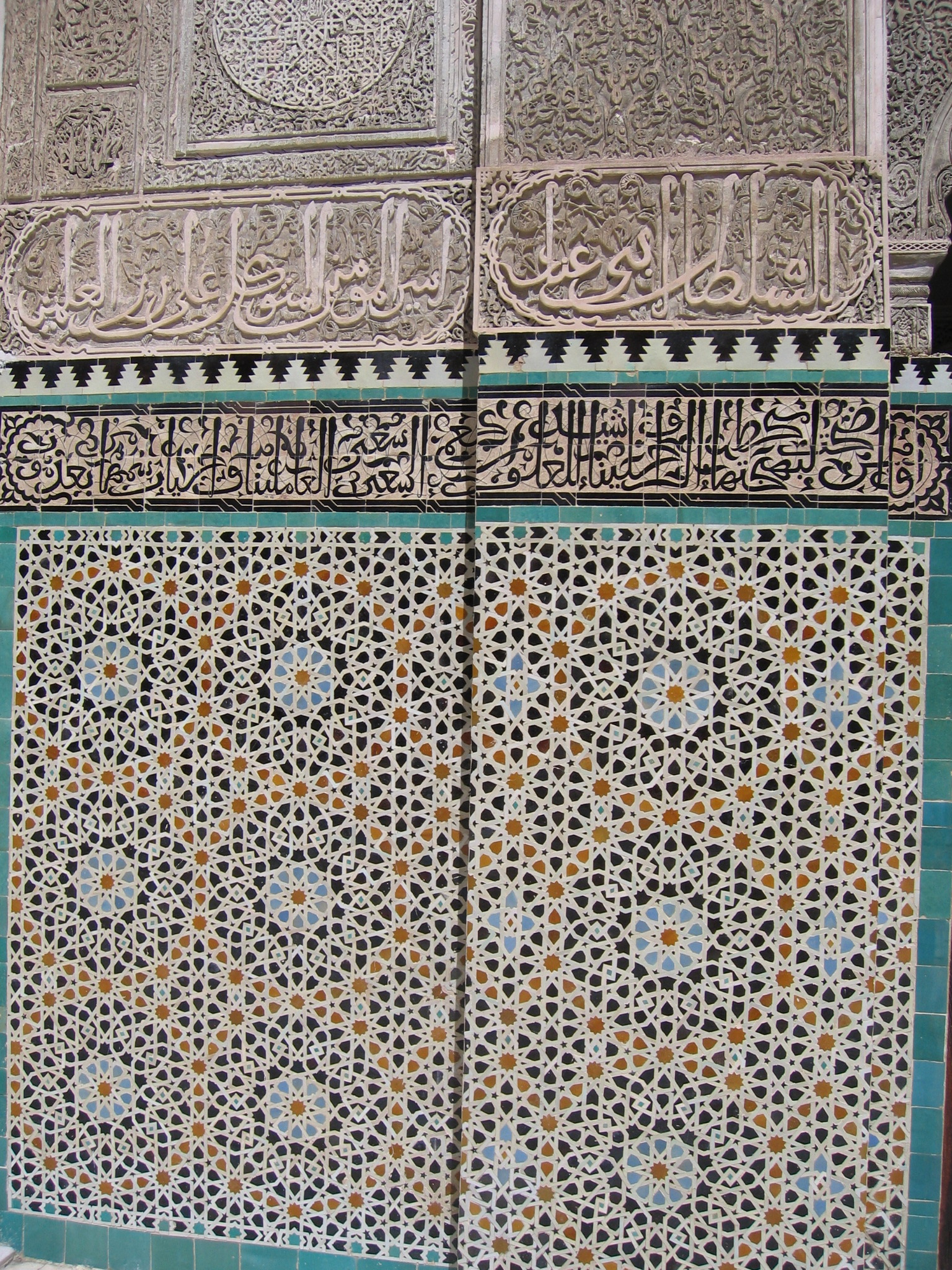
Tessellations: zellige mosaic tiles at Bou Inania Madrasa,
Fes, Morocco

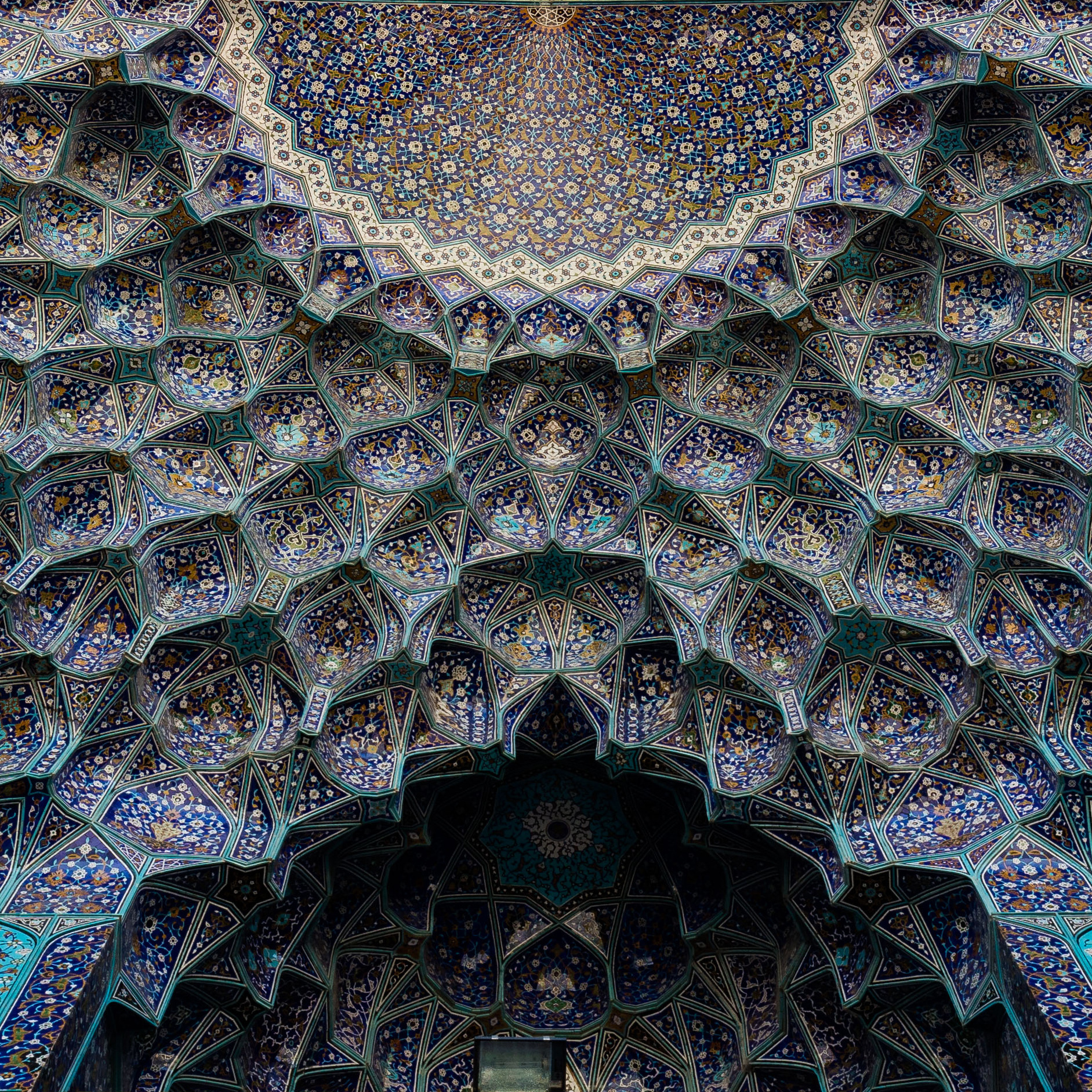
The complex geometry and tilings of the muqarnas vaulting in the Sheikh Lotfollah Mosque, Isfahan

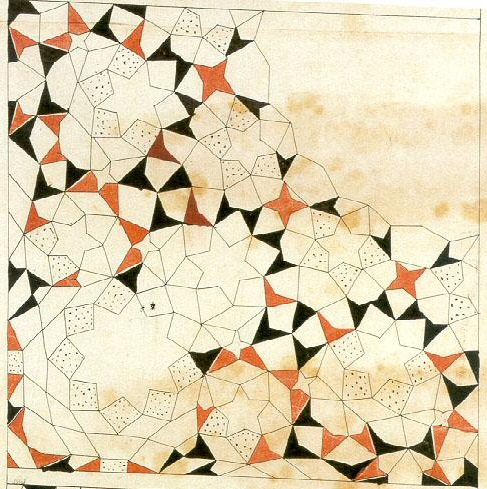
Architect's plan of a muqarnas quarter vault. Topkapı Scroll

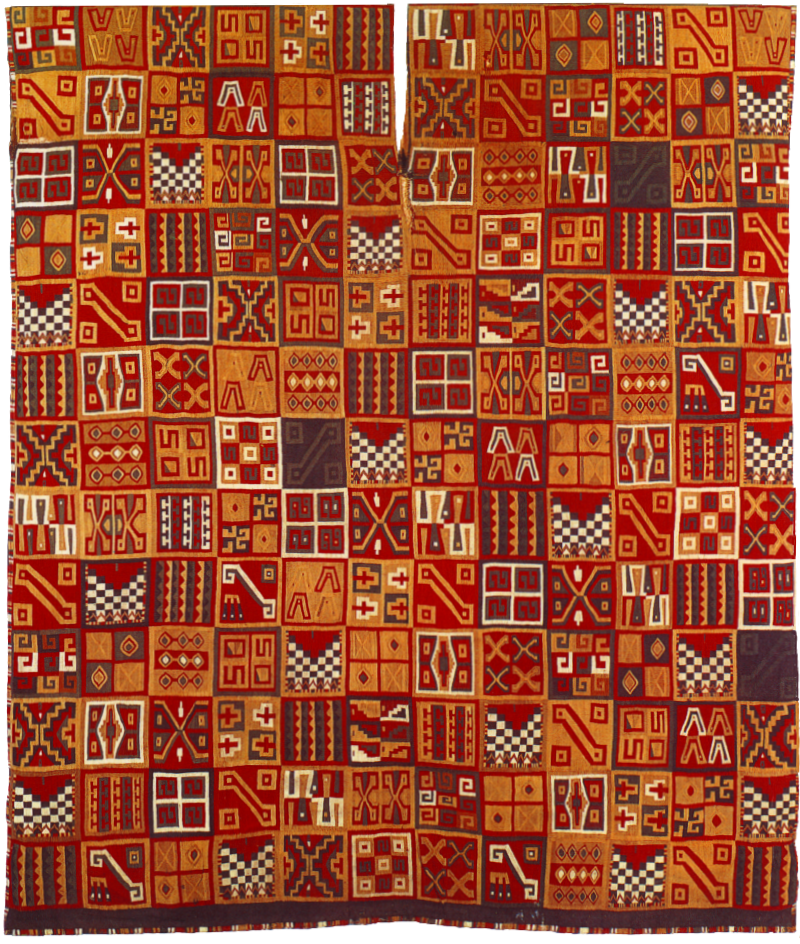
Tupa Inca tunic from Peru, 1450 –1540, an Andean textile denoting high rank

=== Polyhedra ===
The Platonic solids and other polyhedra are a recurring theme in Western art. They are found, for instance, in a marble mosaic featuring the small stellated dodecahedron, attributed to Paolo Uccello, in the floor of the San Marco Basilica in Venice; in Leonardo da Vinci's diagrams of regular polyhedra drawn as illustrations for Luca Pacioli's 1509 book The Divine Proportion; as a glass rhombicuboctahedron in Jacopo de Barbari's portrait of Pacioli, painted in 1495; in the truncated polyhedron (and various other mathematical objects) in Albrecht Dürer's engraving Melencolia I; and in Salvador Dalí's painting The Last Supper in which Christ and his disciples are pictured inside a giant dodecahedron.

Albrecht Dürer (1471–1528) was a German Renaissance printmaker who made important contributions to polyhedral literature in his 1525 book, Underweysung der Messung (Education on Measurement), meant to teach the subjects of linear perspective, geometry in architecture, Platonic solids, and regular polygons. Dürer was likely influenced by the works of Luca Pacioli and Piero della Francesca during his trips to Italy. While the examples of perspective in Underweysung der Messung are underdeveloped and contain inaccuracies, there is a detailed discussion of polyhedra. Dürer is also the first to introduce in text the idea of polyhedral nets, polyhedra unfolded to lie flat for printing. Dürer published another influential book on human proportions called Vier Bücher von Menschlicher Proportion (Four Books on Human Proportion) in 1528.

Dürer's well-known engraving Melencolia I depicts a frustrated thinker sitting by a truncated triangular trapezohedron and a magic square. These two objects, and the engraving as a whole, have been the subject of more modern interpretation than the contents of almost any other print, including a two-volume book by Peter-Klaus Schuster, and an influential discussion in Erwin Panofsky's monograph of Dürer.

Salvador Dalí's 1954 painting Corpus Hypercubus uniquely depicts the cross of Christ as an unfolded three-dimensional net for a hypercube, also known as a tesseract: the unfolding of a tesseract into these eight cubes is analogous to unfolding the sides of a cube into a cross shape of six squares, here representing the divine perspective with a four-dimensional regular polyhedron. The painting shows the figure of Christ in front of the tessaract; he would normally be shown fixed with nails to the cross, but there are no nails in the painting. Instead, there are four small cubes in front of his body, at the corners of the frontmost of the eight tessaract cubes. The mathematician Thomas Banchoff states that Dalí was trying to go beyond the three-dimensional world, while the poet and art critic Kelly Grovier says that "The painting seems to have cracked the link between the spirituality of Christ's salvation and the materiality of geometric and physical forces. It appears to bridge the divide that many feel separates science from religion."

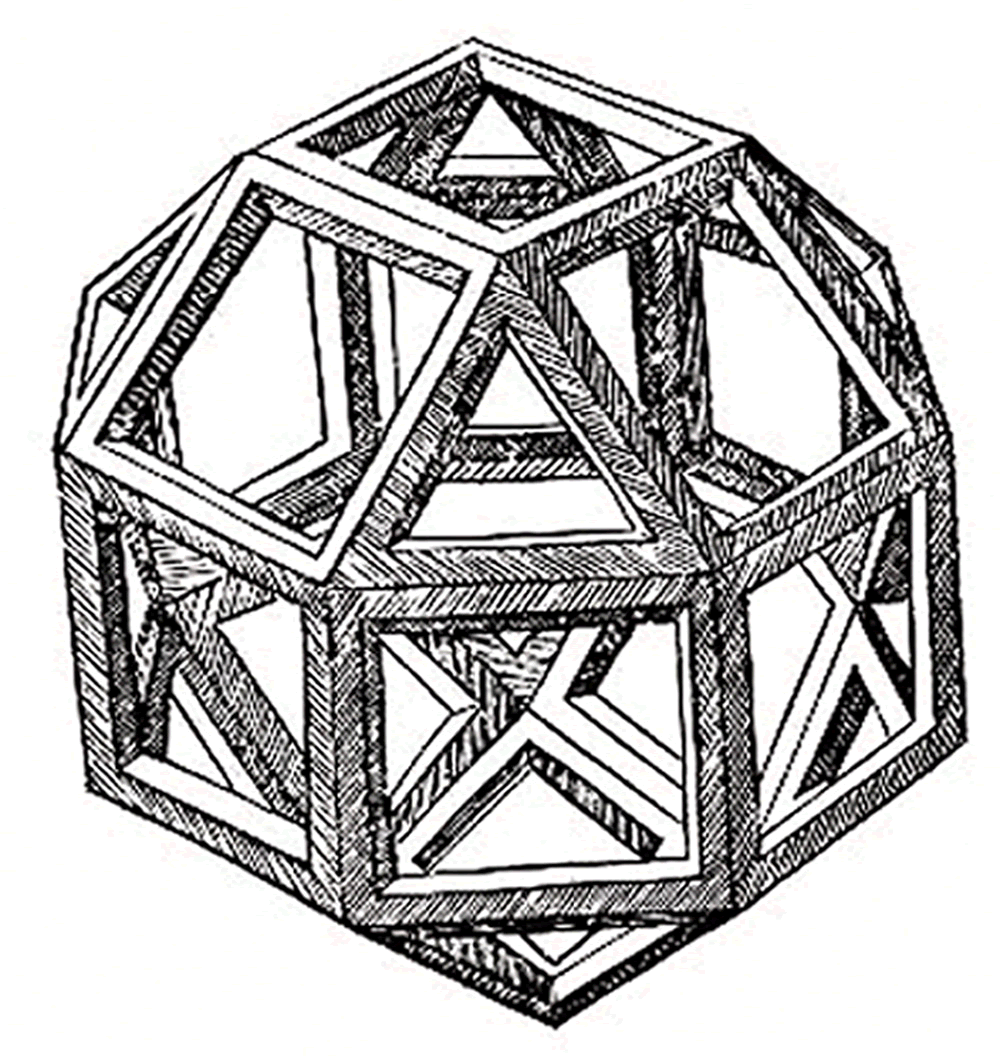
The first printed illustration of a rhombicuboctahedron, by Leonardo da Vinci, published in De Divina Proportione, 1509

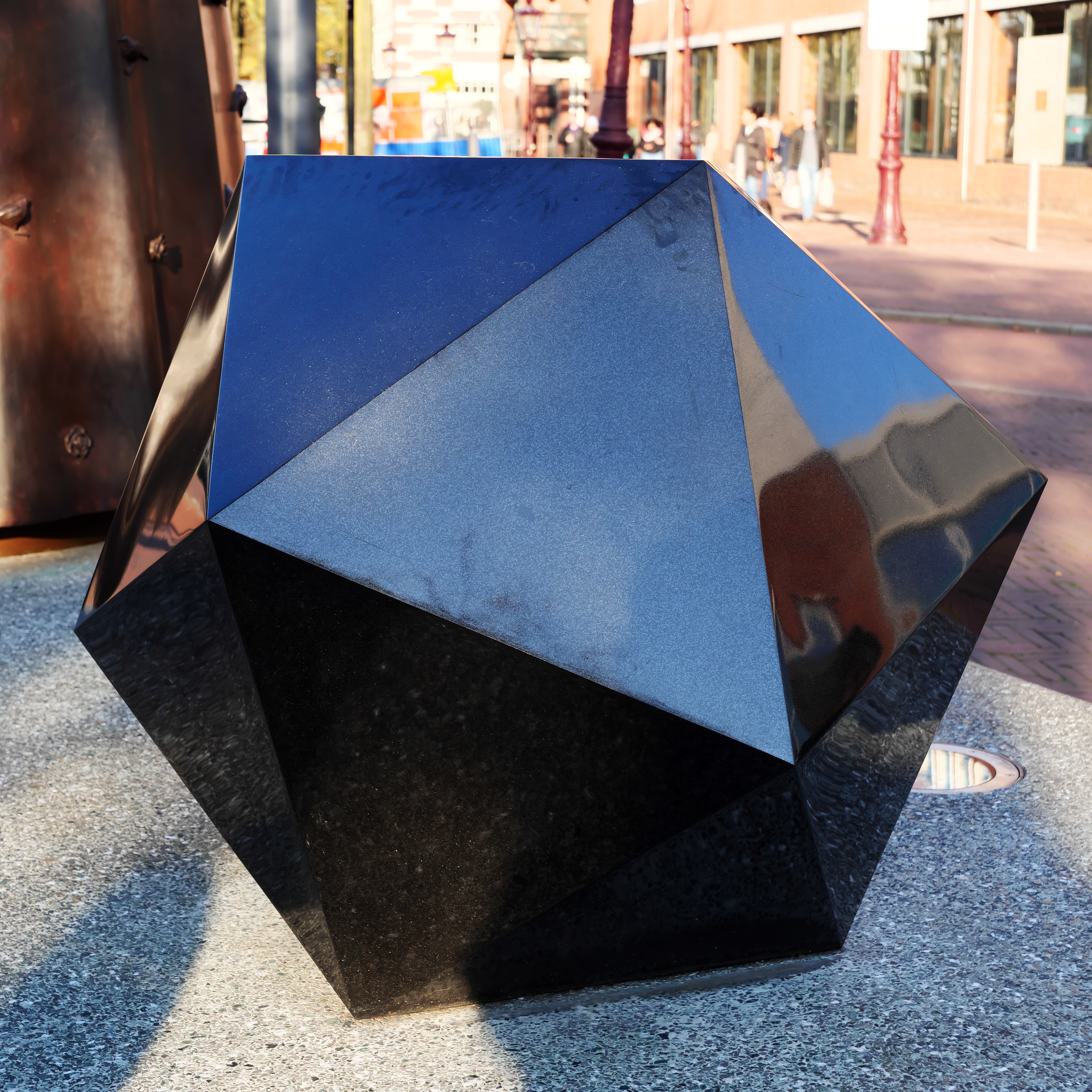
Icosahedron as a part of the monument to Baruch Spinoza, Amsterdam

=== Fractal dimensions ===
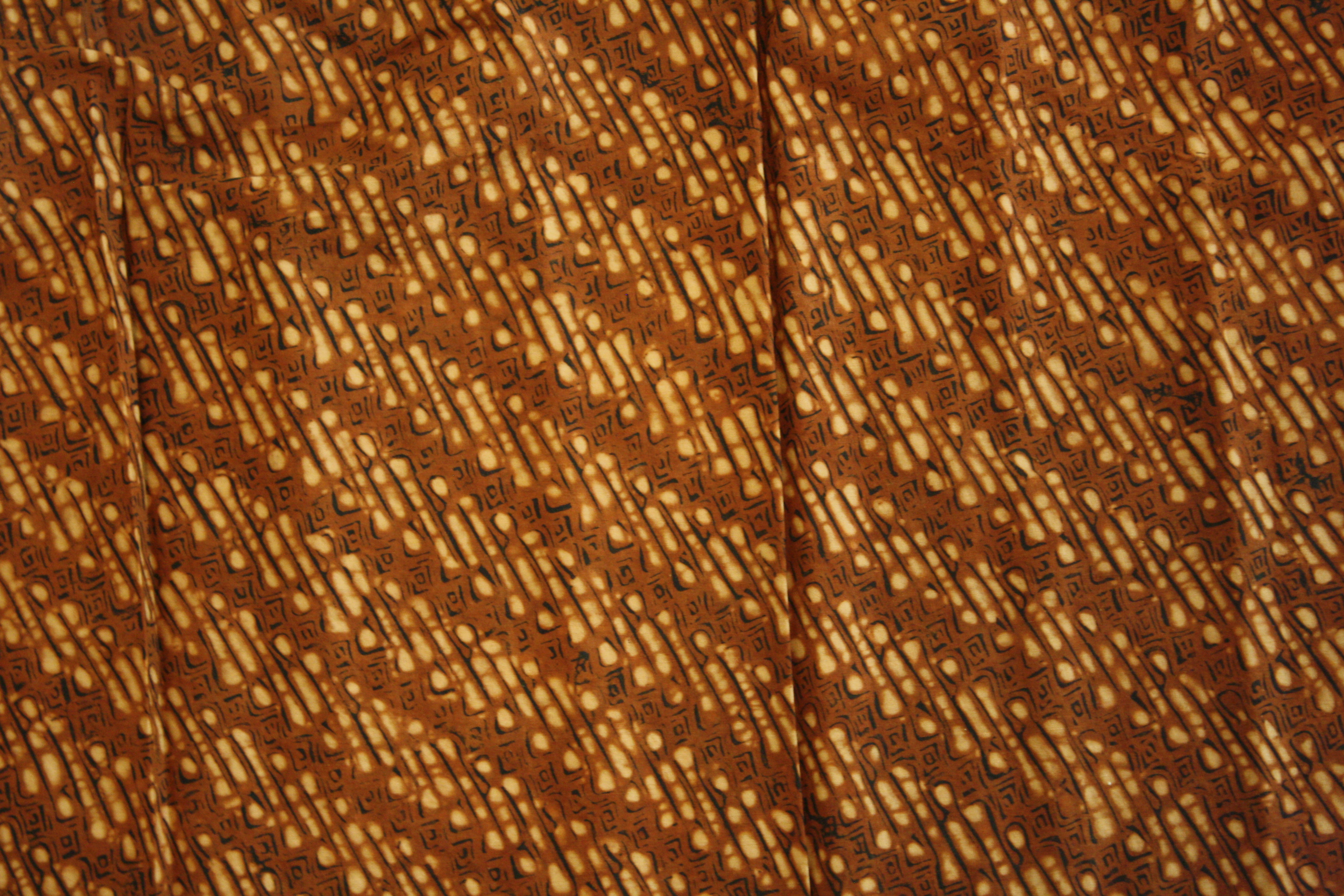
Batiks from Surakarta, Java, like this parang klithik sword pattern, have a fractal dimension between 1.2 and 1.5.

Traditional Indonesian wax-resist batik designs on cloth combine representational motifs (such as floral and vegetal elements) with abstract and somewhat chaotic elements, including imprecision in applying the wax resist, and random variation introduced by cracking of the wax. Batik designs have a fractal dimension between 1 and 2, varying in different regional styles. For example, the batik of Cirebon has a fractal dimension of 1.1; the batiks of Yogyakarta and Surakarta (Solo) in Central Java have a fractal dimension of 1.2 to 1.5; and the batiks of Lasem on the north coast of Java and of Tasikmalaya in West Java have a fractal dimension between 1.5 and 1.7.

The drip painting works of the modern artist Jackson Pollock are similarly distinctive in their fractal dimension. His 1948 Number 14 has a coastline-like dimension of 1.45, while his later paintings had successively higher fractal dimensions and accordingly more elaborate patterns. One of his last works, Blue Poles, took six months to create, and has the fractal dimension of 1.72.

== A complex relationship ==
The astronomer Galileo Galilei in his Il Saggiatore wrote that "[The universe] is written in the language of mathematics, and its characters are triangles, circles, and other geometric figures." Artists who strive and seek to study nature must first, in Galileo's view, fully understand mathematics. Mathematicians, conversely, have sought to interpret and analyse art through the lens of geometry and rationality. The mathematician Felipe Cucker suggests that mathematics, and especially geometry, is a source of rules for "rule-driven artistic creation", though not the only one. Some of the many strands of the resulting complex relationship are described below.

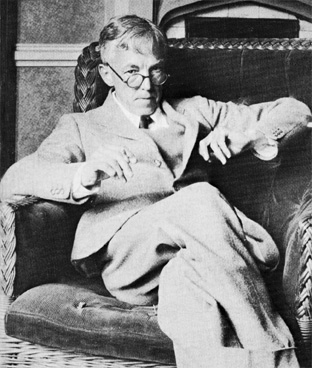
The mathematician G. H. Hardy defined a set of criteria for mathematical beauty.

=== Mathematics as an art ===
The mathematician Jerry P. King describes mathematics as an art, stating that "the keys to mathematics are beauty and elegance and not dullness and technicality", and that beauty is the motivating force for mathematical research. King cites the mathematician G. H. Hardy's 1940 essay A Mathematician's Apology. In it, Hardy discusses why he finds two theorems of classical times as first rate, namely Euclid's proof there are infinitely many prime numbers, and the proof that the square root of 2 is irrational. King evaluates this last against Hardy's criteria for mathematical elegance: "seriousness, depth, generality, unexpectedness, inevitability, and economy" (King's italics), and describes the proof as "aesthetically pleasing". The Hungarian mathematician Paul Erdős agreed that mathematics possessed beauty but considered the reasons beyond explanation: "Why are numbers beautiful? It's like asking why is Beethoven's Ninth Symphony beautiful. If you don't see why, someone can't tell you. I know numbers are beautiful."

=== Mathematical tools for art ===
Mathematics can be discerned in many of the arts, such as music, dance, painting, architecture, and sculpture. Each of these is richly associated with mathematics. Among the connections to the visual arts, mathematics can provide tools for artists, such as the rules of linear perspective as described by Brook Taylor and Johann Lambert, or the methods of descriptive geometry, now applied in software modelling of solids, dating back to Albrecht Dürer and Gaspard Monge. Artists from Luca Pacioli in the Middle Ages and Leonardo da Vinci and Albrecht Dürer in the Renaissance have made use of and developed mathematical ideas in the pursuit of their artistic work. The use of perspective began, despite some embryonic usages in the architecture of Ancient Greece, with Italian painters such as Giotto in the 13th century; rules such as the vanishing point were first formulated by Brunelleschi in about 1413, his theory influencing Leonardo and Dürer. Isaac Newton's work on the optical spectrum influenced Goethe's Theory of Colours and in turn artists such as Philipp Otto Runge, J. M. W. Turner, the Pre-Raphaelites and Wassily Kandinsky. Artists may also choose to analyse the symmetry of a scene. Tools may be applied by mathematicians who are exploring art, or artists inspired by mathematics, such as M. C. Escher (inspired by H. S. M. Coxeter) and the architect Frank Gehry, who more tenuously argued that computer aided design enabled him to express himself in a wholly new way.

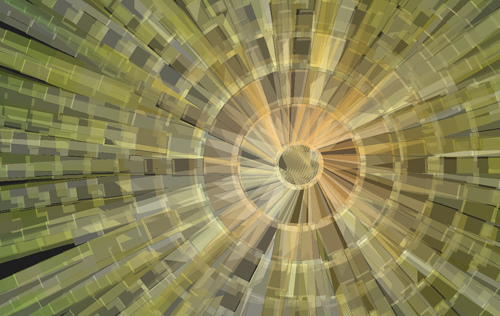
Octopod by Mikael Hvidtfeldt Christensen. Algorithmic art produced with the software Structure Synth

The artist Richard Wright argues that mathematical objects that can be constructed can be seen either "as processes to simulate phenomena" or as works of "computer art". He considers the nature of mathematical thought, observing that fractals were known to mathematicians for a century before they were recognised as such. Wright concludes by stating that it is appropriate to subject mathematical objects to any methods used to "come to terms with cultural artifacts like art, the tension between objectivity and subjectivity, their metaphorical meanings and the character of representational systems." He gives as instances an image from the Mandelbrot set, an image generated by a cellular automaton algorithm, and a computer-rendered image, and discusses, with reference to the Turing test, whether algorithmic products can be art. Sasho Kalajdzievski's Math and Art: An Introduction to Visual Mathematics takes a similar approach, looking at suitably visual mathematics topics such as tilings, fractals and hyperbolic geometry.

Some of the first works of computer art were created by Desmond Paul Henry's "Drawing Machine 1", an analogue machine based on a bombsight computer and exhibited in 1962. The machine was capable of creating complex, abstract, asymmetrical, curvilinear, but repetitive line drawings. More recently, Hamid Naderi Yeganeh has created shapes suggestive of real world objects such as fish and birds, using formulae that are successively varied to draw families of curves or angled lines. Artists such as Mikael Hvidtfeldt Christensen create works of generative or algorithmic art by writing scripts for a software system such as Structure Synth: the artist effectively directs the system to apply a desired combination of mathematical operations to a chosen set of data.

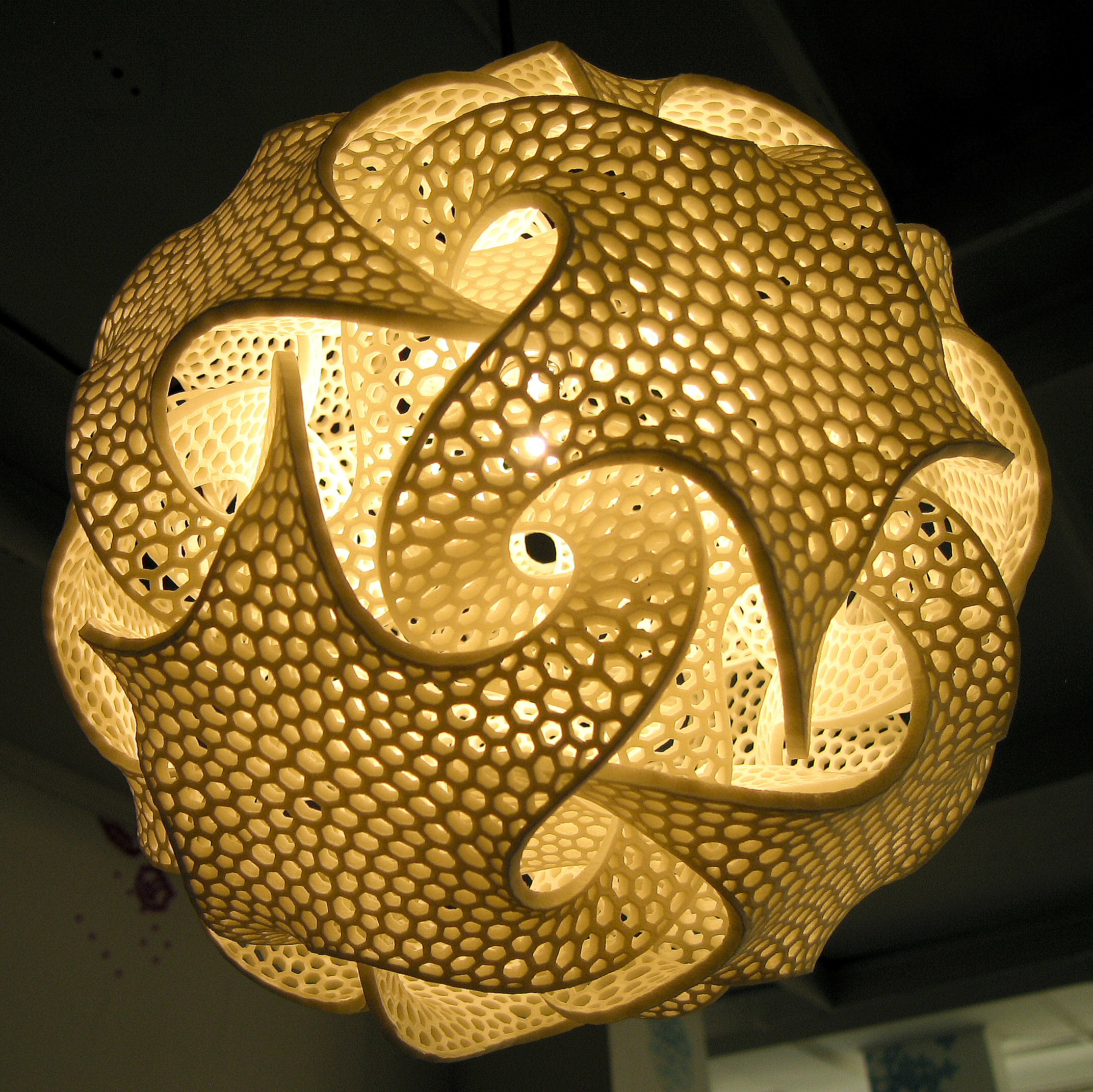
Mathematical sculpture by Bathsheba Grossman, 2007

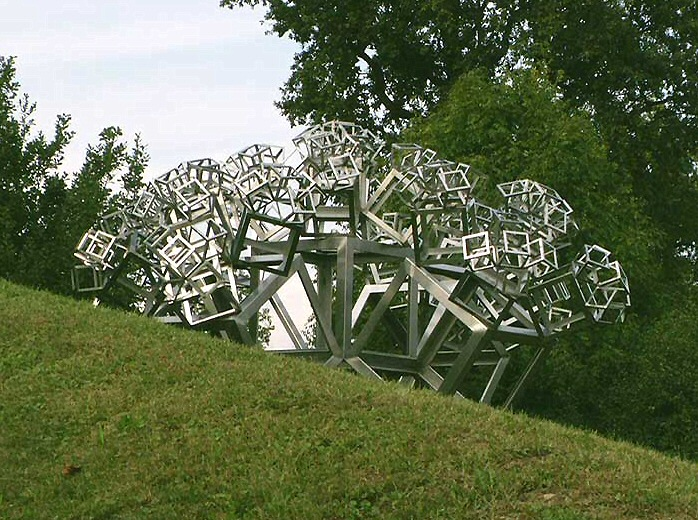
Fractal sculpture: 3D Fraktal 03/H/dd by Hartmut Skerbisch, 2003

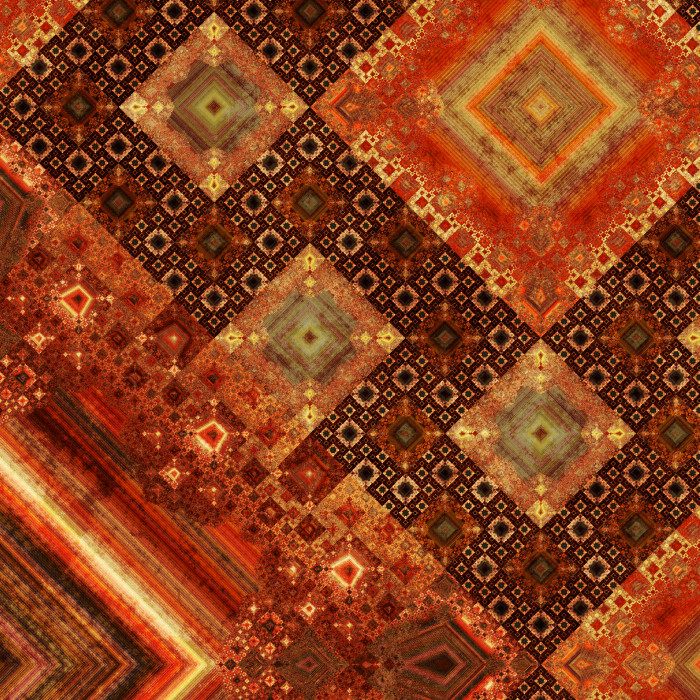
Fibonacci word: detail of artwork by Samuel Monnier, 2009

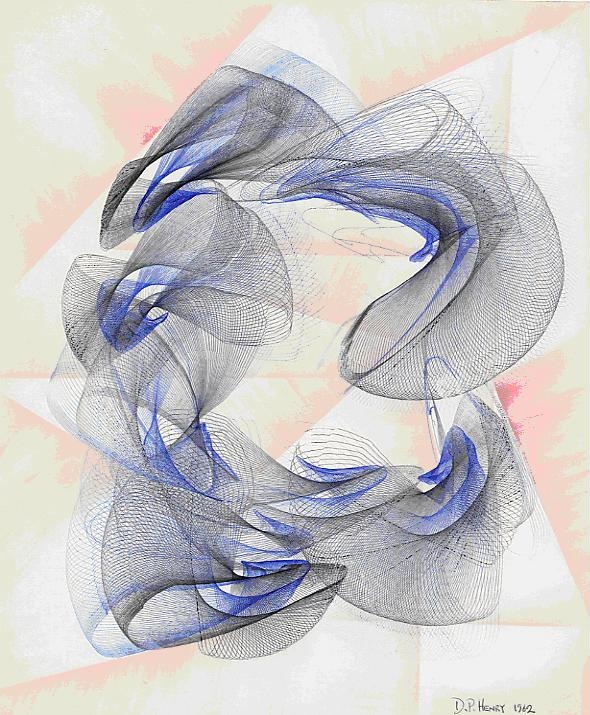
Computer art image produced by Desmond Paul Henry's "Drawing Machine 1", exhibited 1962

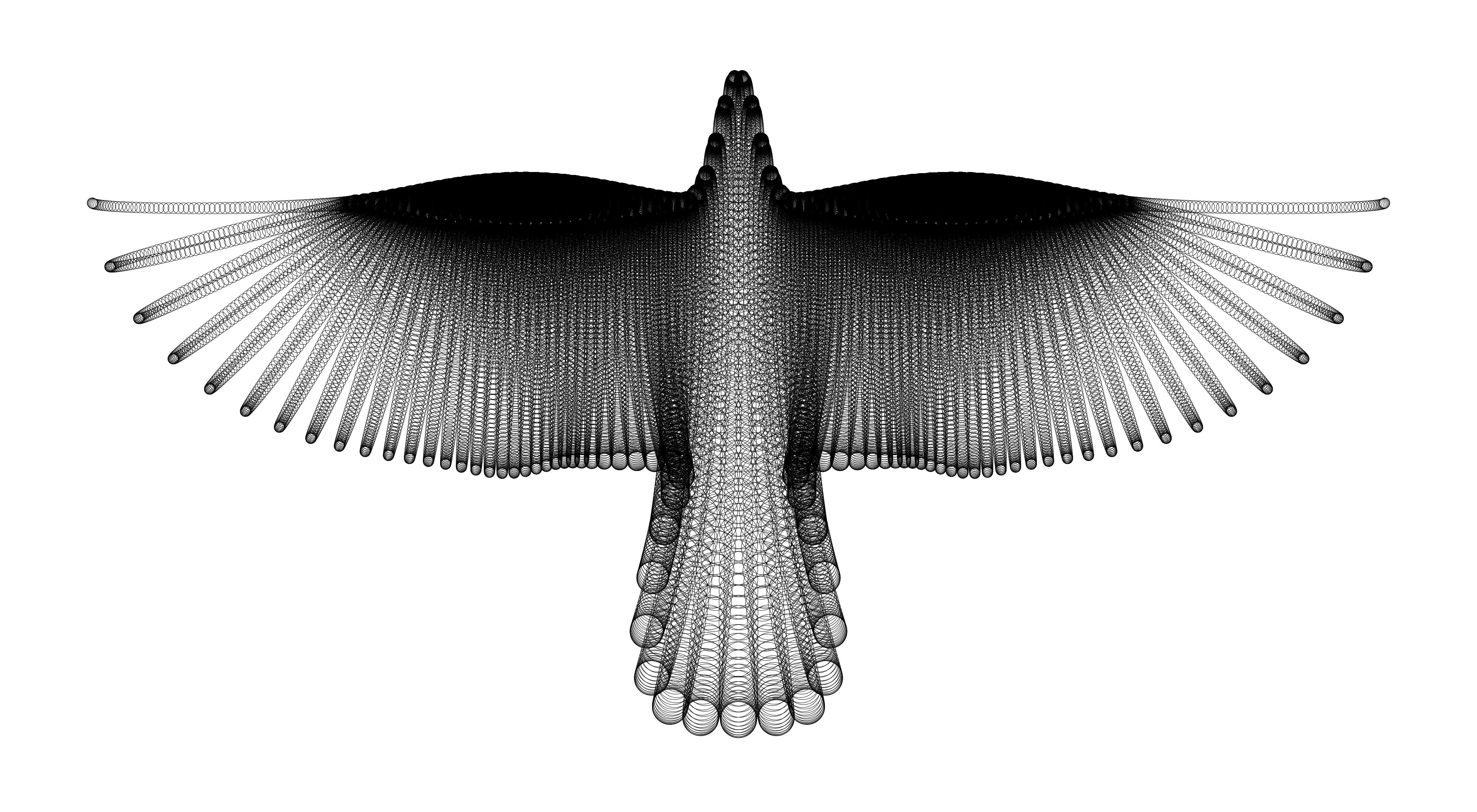
A Bird in Flight, by Hamid Naderi Yeganeh, 2016, constructed with a family of mathematical curves.

=== From mathematics to art ===
Proto-Cubism: Pablo Picasso's 1907 painting Les Demoiselles d'Avignon uses a fourth dimension projection to show a figure both full face and in profile.

The mathematician and theoretical physicist Henri Poincaré's Science and Hypothesis was widely read by the Cubists, including Pablo Picasso and Jean Metzinger. Being thoroughly familiar with Bernhard Riemann's work on non-Euclidean geometry, Poincaré was more than aware that Euclidean geometry is just one of many possible geometric configurations, rather than as an absolute objective truth. The possible existence of a fourth dimension inspired artists to question classical Renaissance perspective: non-Euclidean geometry became a valid alternative. The concept that painting could be expressed mathematically, in colour and form, contributed to Cubism, the art movement that led to abstract art. Metzinger, in 1910, wrote that: "[Picasso] lays out a free, mobile perspective, from which that ingenious mathematician Maurice Princet has deduced a whole geometry". Later, Metzinger wrote in his memoirs:

Maurice Princet joined us often ... it was as an artist that he conceptualized mathematics, as an aesthetician that he invoked n-dimensional continuums. He loved to get the artists interested in the new views on space that had been opened up by Schlegel and some others. He succeeded at that.

The impulse to make teaching or research models of mathematical forms naturally creates objects that have symmetries and surprising or pleasing shapes. Some of these have inspired artists such as the Dadaists Man Ray, Marcel Duchamp and Max Ernst, and following Man Ray, Hiroshi Sugimoto.

Enneper surfaces as Dadaism: Man Ray's 1934 Objet mathematique

Man Ray photographed some of the mathematical models in the Institut Henri Poincaré in Paris, including Objet mathematique (Mathematical object). He noted that this represented Enneper surfaces with constant negative curvature, derived from the pseudo-sphere. This mathematical foundation was important to him, as it allowed him to deny that the object was "abstract", instead claiming that it was as real as the urinal that Duchamp made into a work of art. Man Ray admitted that the object's [Enneper surface] formula "meant nothing to me, but the forms themselves were as varied and authentic as any in nature." He used his photographs of the mathematical models as figures in his series he did on Shakespeare's plays, such as his 1934 painting Antony and Cleopatra. The art reporter Jonathan Keats, writing in ForbesLife, argues that Man Ray photographed "the elliptic paraboloids and conic points in the same sensual light as his pictures of Kiki de Montparnasse", and "ingeniously repurposes the cool calculations of mathematics to reveal the topology of desire". Twentieth century sculptors such as Henry Moore, Barbara Hepworth and Naum Gabo took inspiration from mathematical models. Moore wrote of his 1938 Stringed Mother and Child: "Undoubtedly the source of my stringed figures was the Science Museum ... I was fascinated by the mathematical models I saw there ... It wasn't the scientific study of these models but the ability to look through the strings as with a bird cage and to see one form within another which excited me."

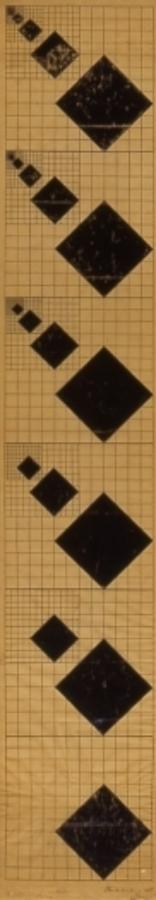
Theo van Doesburg's Six Moments in the Development of Plane to Space, 1926 or 1929

The artists Theo van Doesburg and Piet Mondrian founded the De Stijl movement, which they wanted to "establish a visual vocabulary comprised of elementary geometrical forms comprehensible by all and adaptable to any discipline". Many of their artworks visibly consist of ruled squares and triangles, sometimes also with circles. De Stijl artists worked in painting, furniture, interior design and architecture. After the breakup of De Stijl, Van Doesburg founded the Avant-garde Art Concret movement, describing his 1929–1930 Arithmetic Composition, a series of four black squares on the diagonal of a squared background, as "a structure that can be controlled, a definite surface without chance elements or individual caprice", yet "not lacking in spirit, not lacking the universal and not ... empty as there is everything which fits the internal rhythm". The art critic Gladys Fabre observes that two progressions are at work in the painting, namely the growing black squares and the alternating backgrounds.

The mathematics of tessellation, polyhedra, shaping of space, and self-reference provided the graphic artist M. C. Escher (1898—1972) with a lifetime's worth of materials for his woodcuts. In the Alhambra Sketch, Escher showed that art can be created with polygons or regular shapes such as triangles, squares, and hexagons. Escher used irregular polygons when tiling the plane and often used reflections, glide reflections, and translations to obtain further patterns. Many of his works contain impossible constructions, made using geometrical objects which set up a contradiction between perspective projection and three dimensions, but are pleasant to the human sight. Escher's Ascending and Descending is based on the "impossible staircase" created by the medical scientist Lionel Penrose and his son the mathematician Roger Penrose.

Some of Escher's many tessellation drawings were inspired by conversations with the mathematician H. S. M. Coxeter on hyperbolic geometry. Escher was especially interested in five specific polyhedra, which appear many times in his work. The Platonic solids—tetrahedrons, cubes, octahedrons, dodecahedrons, and icosahedrons—are especially prominent in Order and Chaos and Four Regular Solids. These stellated figures often reside within another figure which further distorts the viewing angle and conformation of the polyhedrons and provides a multifaceted perspective artwork.

The visual intricacy of mathematical structures such as tessellations and polyhedra have inspired a variety of mathematical artworks. Stewart Coffin makes polyhedral puzzles in rare and beautiful woods; George W. Hart works on the theory of polyhedra and sculpts objects inspired by them; Magnus Wenninger makes "especially beautiful" models of complex stellated polyhedra.

The distorted perspectives of anamorphosis have been explored in art since the sixteenth century, when Hans Holbein the Younger incorporated a severely distorted skull in his 1533 painting The Ambassadors. Many artists since then, including Escher, have make use of anamorphic tricks.

The mathematics of topology has inspired several artists in modern times. The sculptor John Robinson (1935–2007) created works such as Gordian Knot and Bands of Friendship, displaying knot theory in polished bronze. Other works by Robinson explore the topology of toruses. Genesis is based on Borromean rings – a set of three circles, no two of which link but in which the whole structure cannot be taken apart without breaking. The sculptor Helaman Ferguson creates complex surfaces and other topological objects. His works are visual representations of mathematical objects; The Eightfold Way is based on the projective special linear group PSL(2,7), a finite group of 168 elements. The sculptor Bathsheba Grossman similarly bases her work on mathematical structures. The artist Nelson Saiers uses mathematical concepts and theorems in his art from toposes and schemes to the four color theorem and the irrationality of π, incorporating them into commentary on history and social justice.

A liberal arts inquiry project examines connections between mathematics and art through the Möbius strip, flexagons, origami and panorama photography.

Mathematical objects including the Lorenz manifold and the hyperbolic plane have been crafted using fiber arts including crochet. (Note: Images and videos of Hinke Osinga's crocheted Lorenz manifold reached international television news, as can be seen in the linked website.) The American weaver Ada Dietz wrote a 1949 monograph Algebraic Expressions in Handwoven Textiles, defining weaving patterns based on the expansion of multivariate polynomials. The mathematician Daina Taimiņa demonstrated features of the hyperbolic plane by crocheting in 2001. This led Margaret and Christine Wertheim to crochet a coral reef, consisting of many marine animals such as nudibranchs whose shapes are based on hyperbolic planes. The mathematician J. C. P. Miller used the Rule 90 cellular automaton to design tapestries depicting both trees and abstract patterns of triangles. The "mathekniticians" Pat Ashforth and Steve Plummer use knitted versions of mathematical objects such as hexaflexagons in their teaching, though their Menger sponge proved too troublesome to knit and was made of plastic canvas instead. Their "mathghans" (Afghans for Schools) project introduced knitting into the British mathematics and technology curriculum.

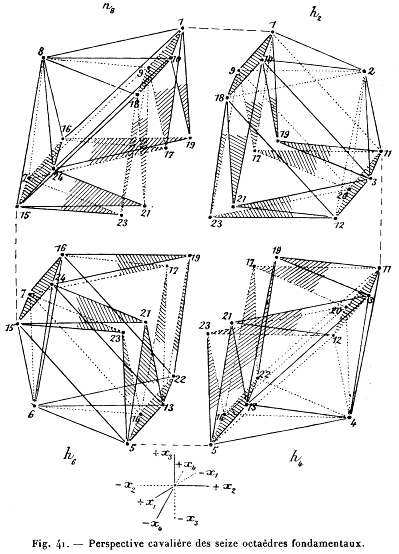
Four-dimensional space to Cubism: Esprit Jouffret's 1903 Traité élémentaire de géométrie à quatre dimensions. (Note: Maurice Princet gave a copy to Pablo Picasso, whose sketchbooks for Les Demoiselles d'Avignon illustrate Jouffret's influence.)

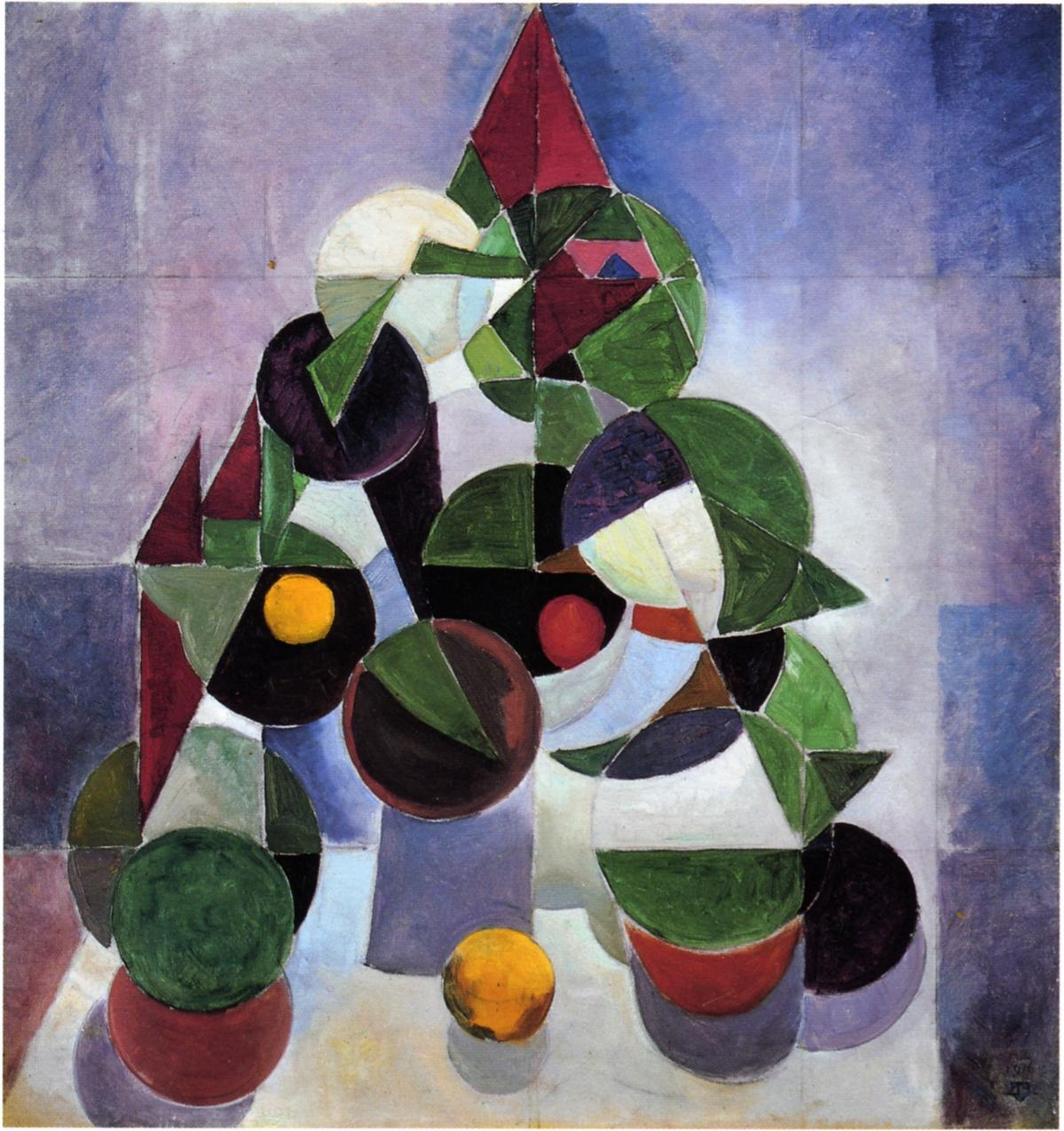
De Stijl: Theo van Doesburg's geometric Composition I (Still Life), 1916

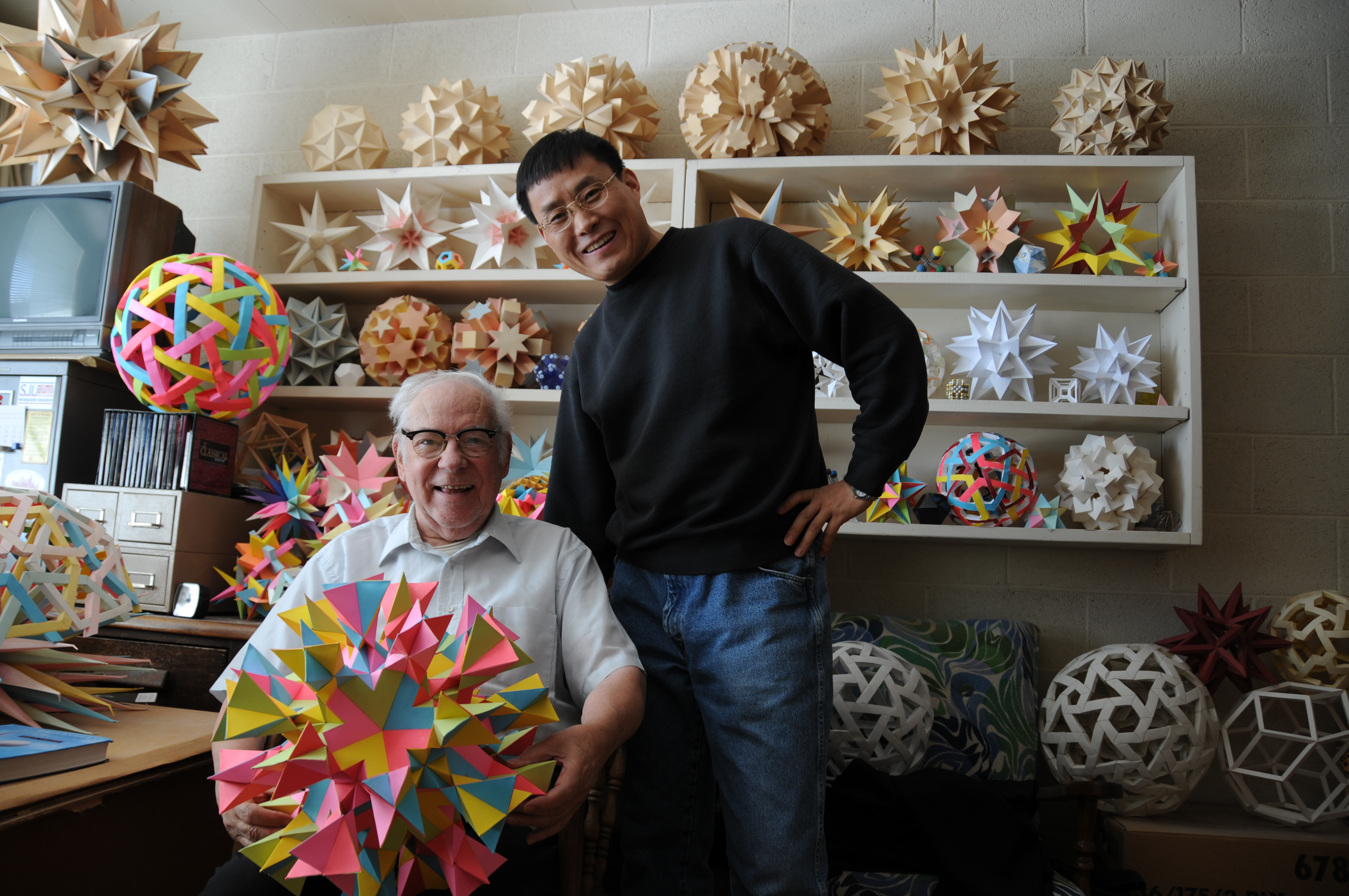
Pedagogy to art: Magnus Wenninger with some of his stellated polyhedra, 2009

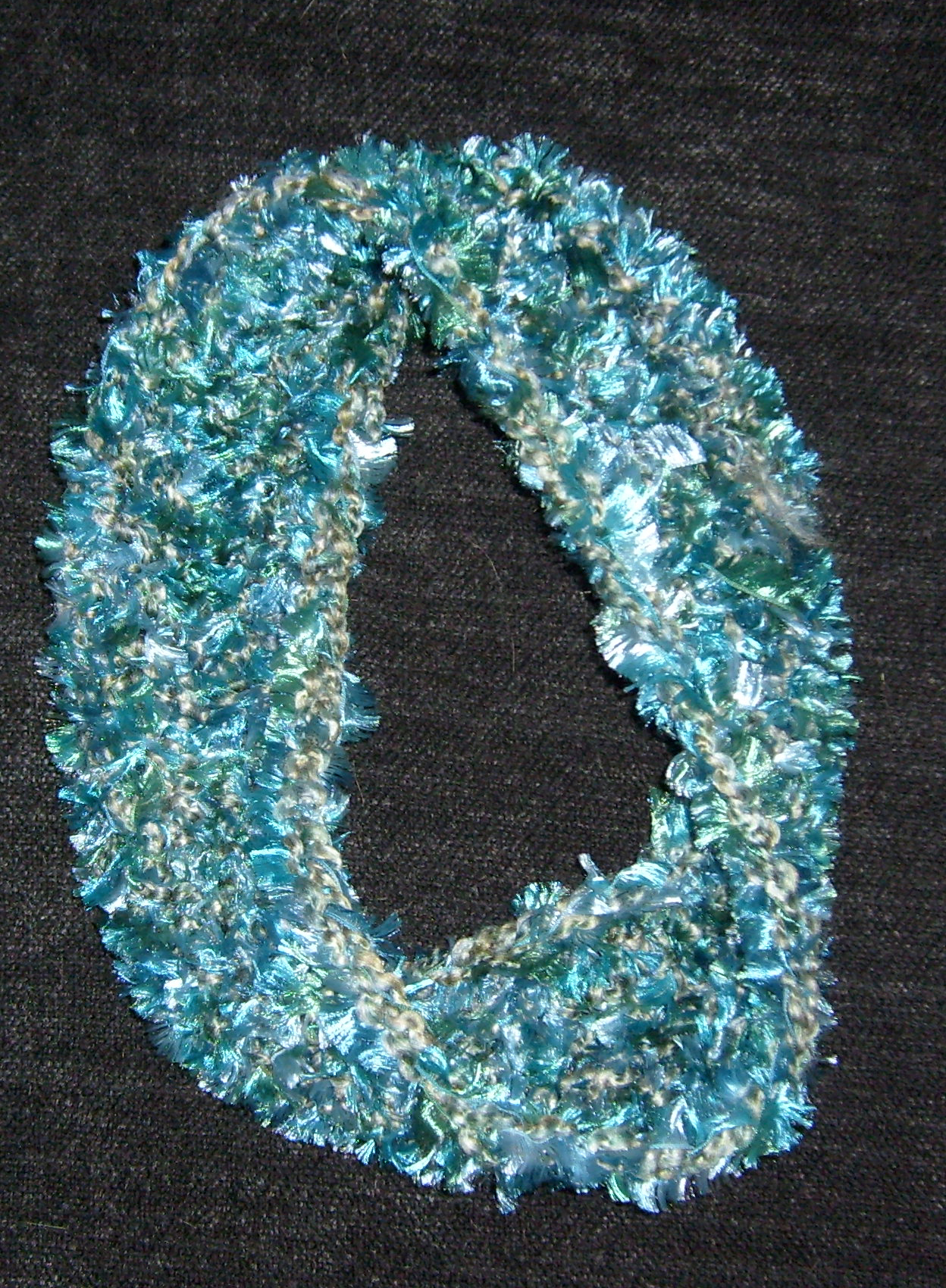
A Möbius strip scarf in crochet, 2007

Anamorphism: The Ambassadors by Hans Holbein the Younger, 1533, with severely distorted skull in foreground

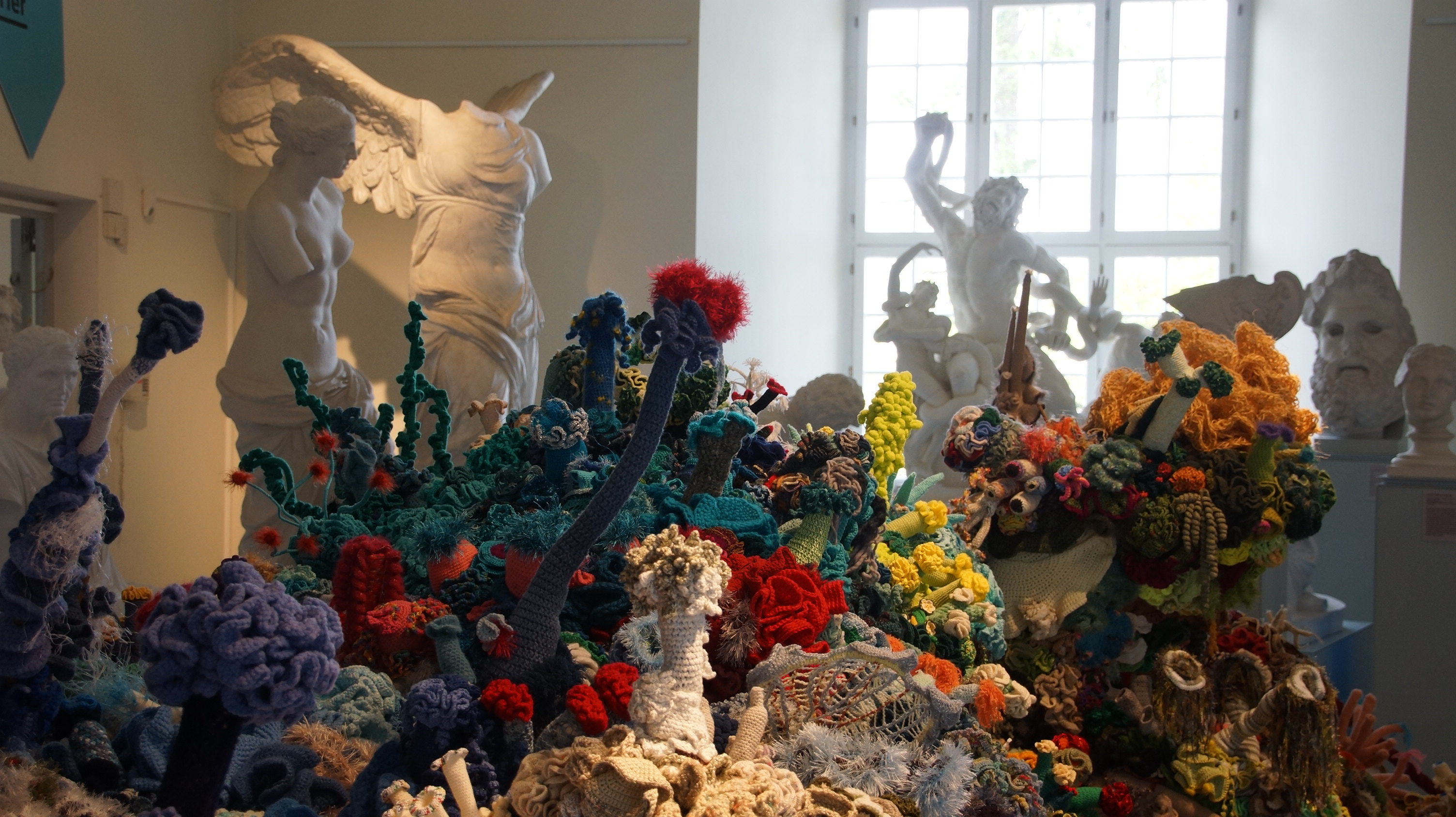
Crocheted coral reef: many animals modelled as hyperbolic planes with varying parameters by Margaret and Christine Wertheim. Föhr Reef, Tübingen, 2013

=== Illustrating mathematics ===
Modelling is far from the only possible way to illustrate mathematical concepts. Giotto's Stefaneschi Triptych, 1320, illustrates recursion in the form of mise en abyme; the central panel of the triptych contains, lower left, the kneeling figure of Cardinal Stefaneschi, holding up the triptych as an offering. Giorgio de Chirico's metaphysical paintings such as his 1917 Great Metaphysical Interior explore the question of levels of representation in art by depicting paintings within his paintings.

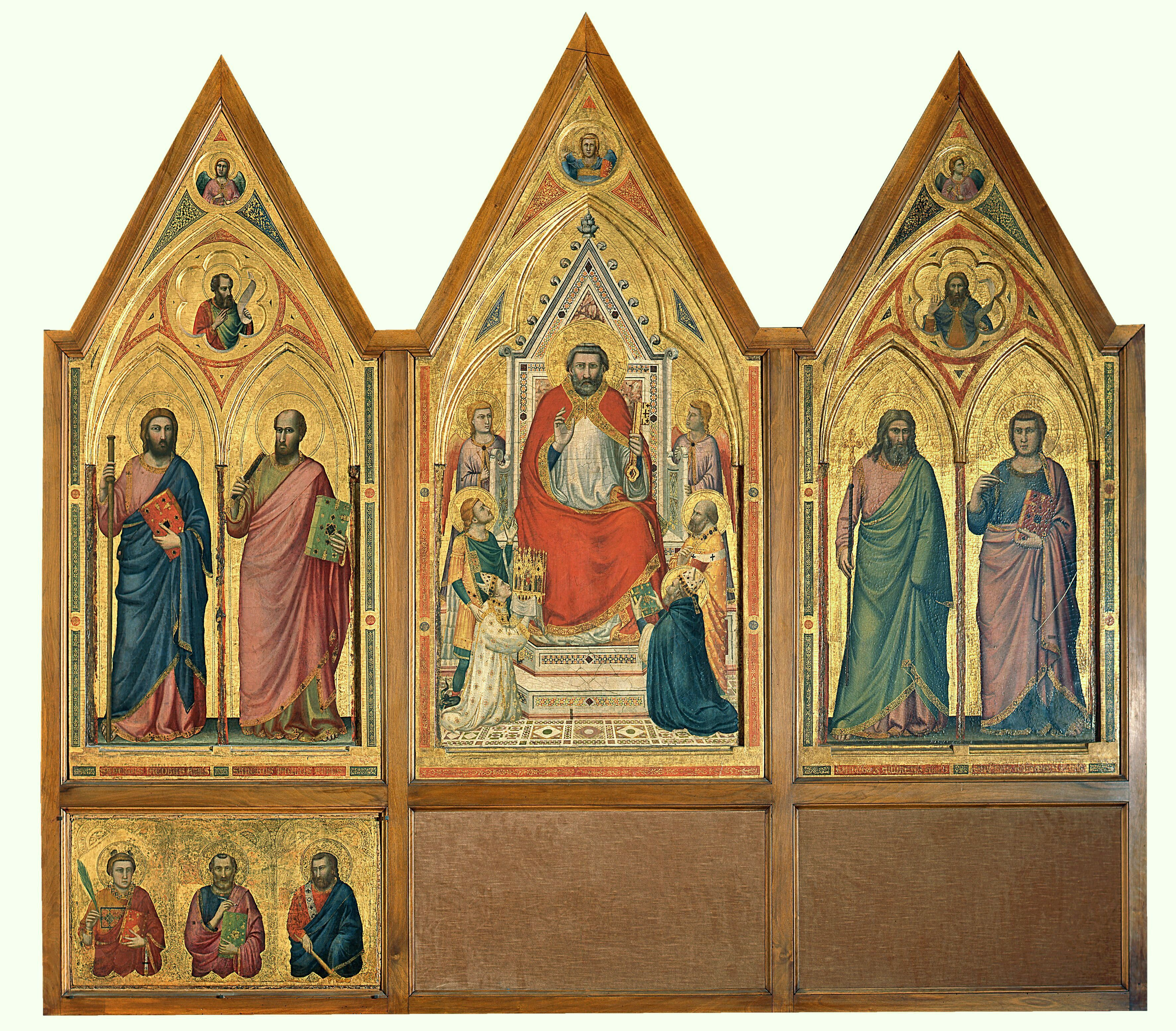
Front face of Giotto's Stefaneschi Triptych, 1320 illustrates recursion.

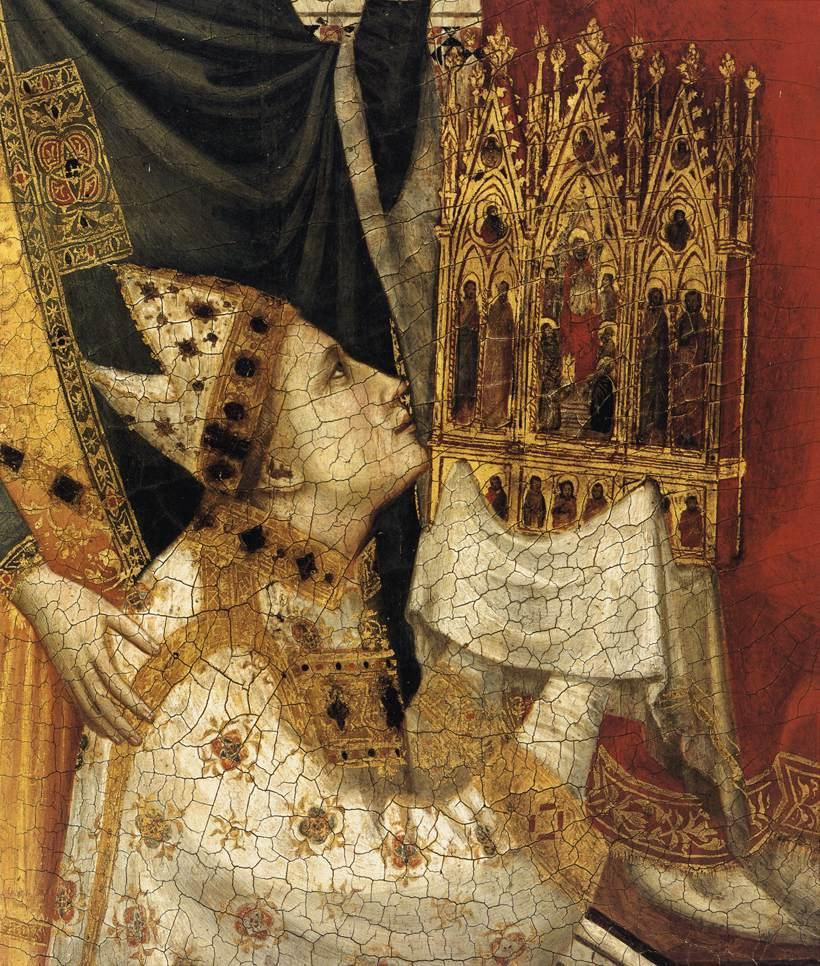
Detail of Cardinal Stefaneschi holding the triptych

Art can exemplify logical paradoxes, as in some paintings by the surrealist René Magritte, which can be read as semiotic jokes about confusion between levels. In La condition humaine (1933), Magritte depicts an easel (on the real canvas), seamlessly supporting a view through a window which is framed by "real" curtains in the painting. Earlier artists such as Rembrandt had already explored the question of framing, in multiple paintings such as his 1646 The Holy Family with a Curtain. That work depicts both the scene and its frame (both wood and curtain), introducing a level confusion between reality and depiction of reality. Alberti, in his discussion of perspective, had likened paintings to open windows on to the scenes depicted. In La condition humaine, Magritte, in the words of the art historian András Rényi, "escalates the subversive power of the iconic difference that is already manifest in Rembrandt, and heightens it to an open paradox." In Rényi's view, the resulting visual joke is the entire purpose of the painting, subverting the art of painting. He comments that La condition humaine is "more of a painted, meta-painterly philosopheme than a painterly work".

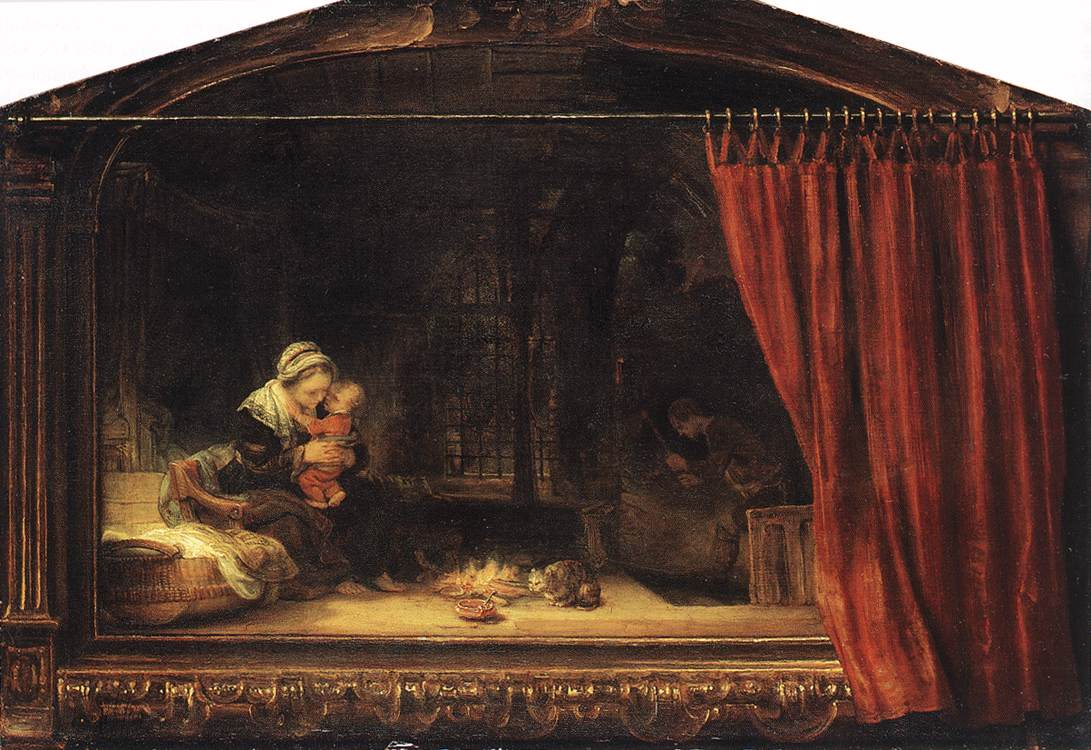
Rembrandt, The Holy Family with a Curtain, 1646 depicts both the scene and its frame (both wood and curtain), introducing a level confusion between reality and depiction of reality.

Semiotic joke: René Magritte's 1933 painting La condition humaine promotes the confusion of levels of scene and frame to visual paradox.

Another approach to mathematical paradox is taken in Escher's Print Gallery (1956); this is a print which depicts a distorted city which contains a gallery which recursively contains the picture, and so ad infinitum. Magritte made use of spheres and cuboids to distort reality in a different way, painting them alongside an assortment of houses in his 1931 Mental Arithmetic as if they were children's building blocks, but house-sized. The Guardian observed that the "eerie toytown image" prophesied Modernism's usurpation of "cosy traditional forms", but also plays with the human tendency to seek patterns in nature.

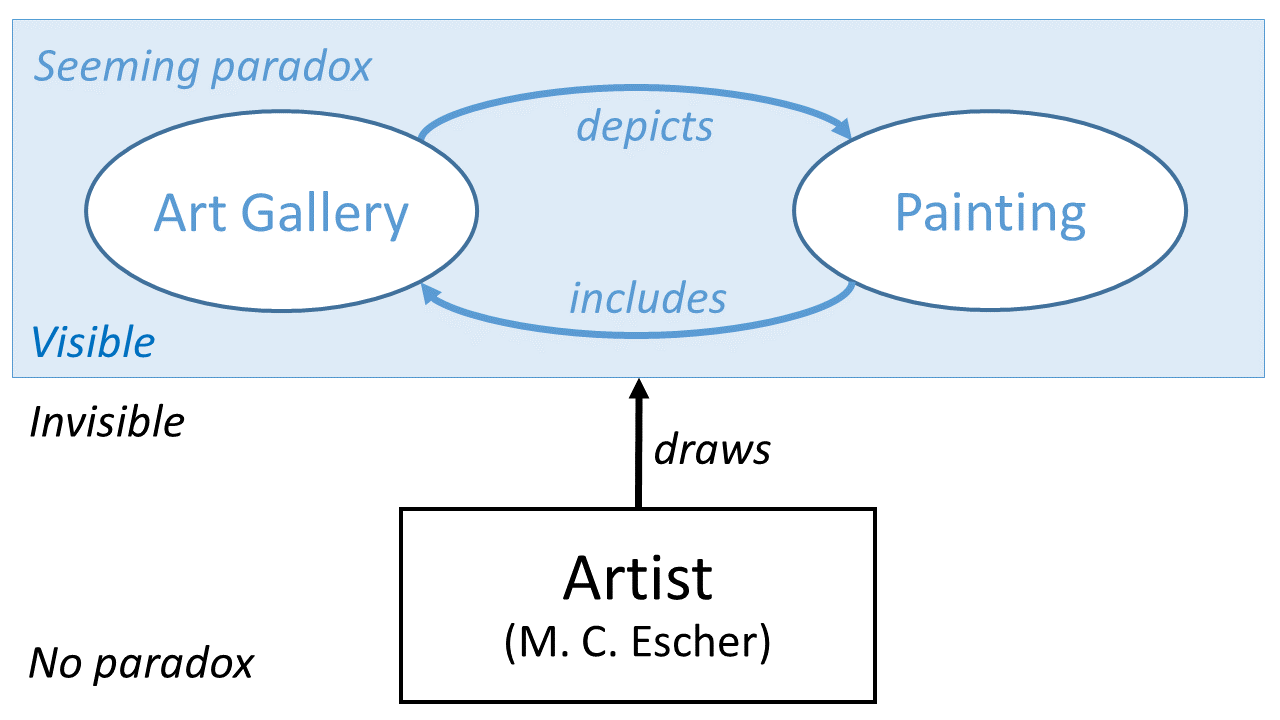
Diagram of the apparent paradox embodied in M. C. Escher's 1956 lithograph Print Gallery, as discussed by Douglas Hofstadter in his 1980 book Gödel, Escher, Bach

Salvador Dalí's last painting, The Swallow's Tail (1983), was part of a series inspired by René Thom's catastrophe theory. The Spanish painter and sculptor Pablo Palazuelo (1916–2007) focused on the investigation of form. He developed a style that he described as the geometry of life and the geometry of all nature. Consisting of simple geometric shapes with detailed patterning and coloring, in works such as Angular I and Automnes, Palazuelo expressed himself in geometric transformations.

The artist Adrian Gray practises stone balancing, exploiting friction and the centre of gravity to create striking and seemingly impossible compositions.

Lithograph Print Gallery by M. C. Escher, 1956

Artists, however, do not necessarily take geometry literally. As Douglas Hofstadter writes in his 1980 reflection on human thought, Gödel, Escher, Bach, by way of (among other things) the mathematics of art: "The difference between an Escher drawing and non-Euclidean geometry is that in the latter, comprehensible interpretations can be found for the undefined terms, resulting in a comprehensible total system, whereas for the former, the end result is not reconcilable with one's conception of the world, no matter how long one stares at the pictures." Hofstadter discusses the seemingly paradoxical lithograph Print Gallery by M. C. Escher; it depicts a seaside town containing an art gallery which seems to contain a painting of the seaside town, there being a "strange loop, or tangled hierarchy" to the levels of reality in the image. The artist himself, Hofstadter observes, is not seen; his reality and his relation to the lithograph are not paradoxical. The image's central void has also attracted the interest of mathematicians Bart de Smit and Hendrik Lenstra, who propose that it could contain a Droste effect copy of itself, rotated and shrunk; this would be a further illustration of recursion beyond that noted by Hofstadter.

=== Analysis of art history ===
Algorithmic analysis of images of artworks, for example using X-ray fluorescence spectroscopy, can reveal information about art. Such techniques can uncover images in layers of paint later covered over by an artist; help art historians to visualize an artwork before it cracked or faded; help to tell a copy from an original, or distinguish the brushstroke style of a master from those of his apprentices.

Max Ernst was photographed in the act of making Lissajous figures in New York, 1942. He used a conical dispenser suspended by a string from a second string, which was in turn attached at two points to a rod. The dispenser was allowed to swing freely over a square sheet to create the artwork, while the artist sat nearby, watching the process.

The 20th century Dadaist artist Max Ernst painted Lissajous figures directly by swinging a punctured bucket of paint over a canvas. He had himself photographed in the act of making the mathematical figures in New York in 1942. He suspended the paint container by a string from a second string, which was in turn attached at two points to a rod. He allowed the container to swing freely over a square sheet to create the artwork, while he sat nearby, dressed in a suit and tie, watching the process. (Note: The photograph was published in Kenneth M. Swezey's 1952 McGraw-Hill book Science Magic.) Ernst was the first to introduce the use of this semi-automatic form of drip painting (also called "oscillation"), which he popularised. He applied the technique to multiple paintings during his artistic career, including his 1942 works The Bewildered Planet, Surrealism and Painting, and Young Man Intrigued by the Flight of a Non-Euclidean Fly, and his 1970 work Green Zone. Lissajous figures later featured repeatedly in early computer art. Ernst's use of the mathematical technique likely influenced Jackson Pollock's drip painting style. Pollock's paintings have a definite fractal dimension of controlled chaos.

The computer scientist Neil Dodgson investigated whether Bridget Riley's stripe paintings could be characterised mathematically, concluding that while separation distance could "provide some characterisation" and global entropy worked on some paintings, autocorrelation failed as Riley's patterns were irregular. Local entropy worked best, and correlated well with the description given by the art critic Robert Kudielka.

The American mathematician George Birkhoff's 1933 Aesthetic Measure proposes a quantitative metric of the aesthetic quality of an artwork. It does not attempt to measure the connotations of a work, such as what a painting might mean, but is limited to the "elements of order" of a polygonal figure. Birkhoff first combines (as a sum) five such elements: whether there is a vertical axis of symmetry; whether there is optical equilibrium; how many rotational symmetries it has; how wallpaper-like the figure is; and whether there are unsatisfactory features such as having two vertices too close together. This metric, O, takes a value between −3 and 7. The second metric, C, counts elements of the figure, which for a polygon is the number of different straight lines containing at least one of its sides. Birkhoff then defines his aesthetic measure of an object's beauty as O/C. This can be interpreted as a balance between the pleasure looking at the object gives, and the amount of effort needed to take it in. Birkhoff's proposal has been criticized in various ways, not least for trying to put beauty in a formula, but he never claimed to have done that.

=== Stimuli to mathematical research ===
Art has sometimes stimulated the development of mathematics, as when Brunelleschi's theory of perspective in architecture and painting started a cycle of research that led to the work of Brook Taylor and Johann Heinrich Lambert on the mathematical foundations of perspective drawing, and ultimately to the mathematics of projective geometry of Girard Desargues and Jean-Victor Poncelet.

The Japanese paper-folding art of origami has been reworked mathematically by Tomoko Fusé using modules, congruent pieces of paper such as squares, and making them into polyhedra or tilings. Paper-folding was used in 1893 by T. Sundara Rao in his Geometric Exercises in Paper Folding to demonstrate geometrical proofs. The mathematics of paper folding has been explored in Maekawa's theorem, Kawasaki's theorem, and the Huzita–Hatori axioms.

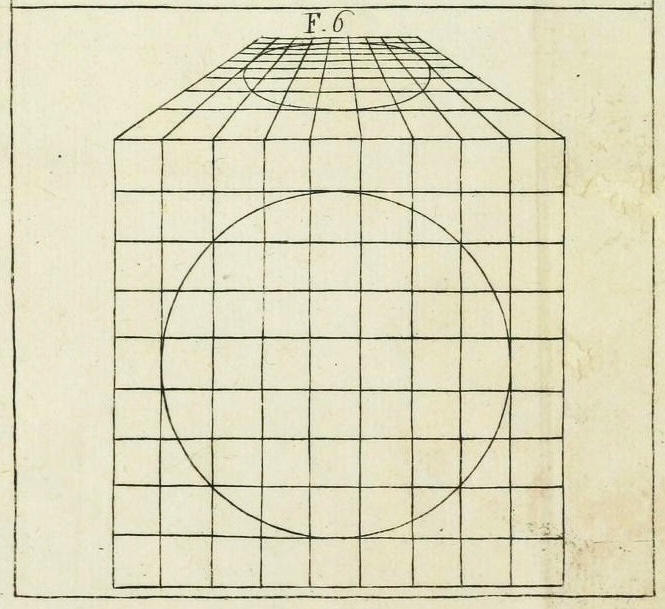
Stimulus to projective geometry: Alberti's diagram showing a circle seen in perspective as an ellipse. Della Pittura, 1435–1436

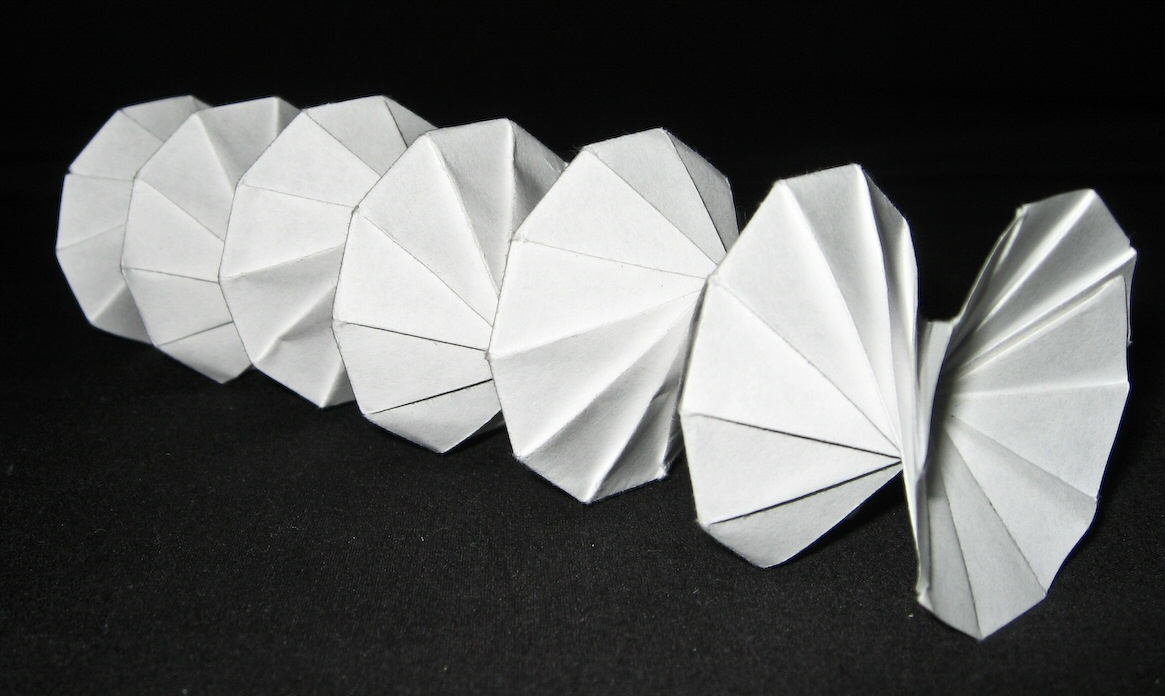
Mathematical origami: Spring Into Action, by Jeff Beynon, made from a single paper rectangle.

=== Illusion to op art ===
The Fraser spiral illusion, named for Sir James Fraser who discovered it in 1908.

Optical illusions such as the Fraser spiral strikingly demonstrate limitations in human visual perception, creating what the art historian Ernst Gombrich called a "baffling trick." The black and white ropes that appear to form spirals are in fact concentric circles. The mid-twentieth century op art or optical art style of painting and graphics exploited such effects to create the impression of movement and flashing or vibrating patterns seen in the work of artists such as Bridget Riley, Spyros Horemis, and Victor Vasarely.

=== Sacred geometry ===
A strand of art from Ancient Greece onwards sees God as the geometer of the world, and the world's geometry therefore as sacred. The belief that God created the universe according to a geometric plan has ancient origins. Plutarch attributed the belief to Plato, writing that "Plato said God geometrizes continually" (Convivialium disputationum, liber 8,2). This image has influenced Western thought ever since. The Platonic concept derived in its turn from a Pythagorean notion of harmony in music, where the notes were spaced in perfect proportions, corresponding to the lengths of the lyre's strings; indeed, the Pythagoreans held that everything was arranged by Number. In the same way, in Platonic thought, the regular or Platonic solids dictate the proportions found in nature, and in art. An illumination in the 13th-century Codex Vindobonensis shows God drawing out the universe with a pair of compasses, which may refer to a verse in the Old Testament: "When he established the heavens I was there: when he set a compass upon the face of the deep" (Proverbs 8:27). In 1596, the mathematical astronomer Johannes Kepler modelled the universe as a set of nested Platonic solids, determining the relative sizes of the orbits of the planets. William Blake's Ancient of Days (depicting Urizen, Blake's embodiment of reason and law) and his painting of the physicist Isaac Newton, naked, hunched and drawing with a compass, use the symbolism of compasses to critique conventional reason and materialism as narrow-minded. Salvador Dalí's 1954 Crucifixion (Corpus Hypercubus) depicts the cross as a hypercube, representing the divine perspective with four dimensions rather than the usual three. In Dalí's The Sacrament of the Last Supper (1955) Christ and his disciples are pictured inside a giant dodecahedron.

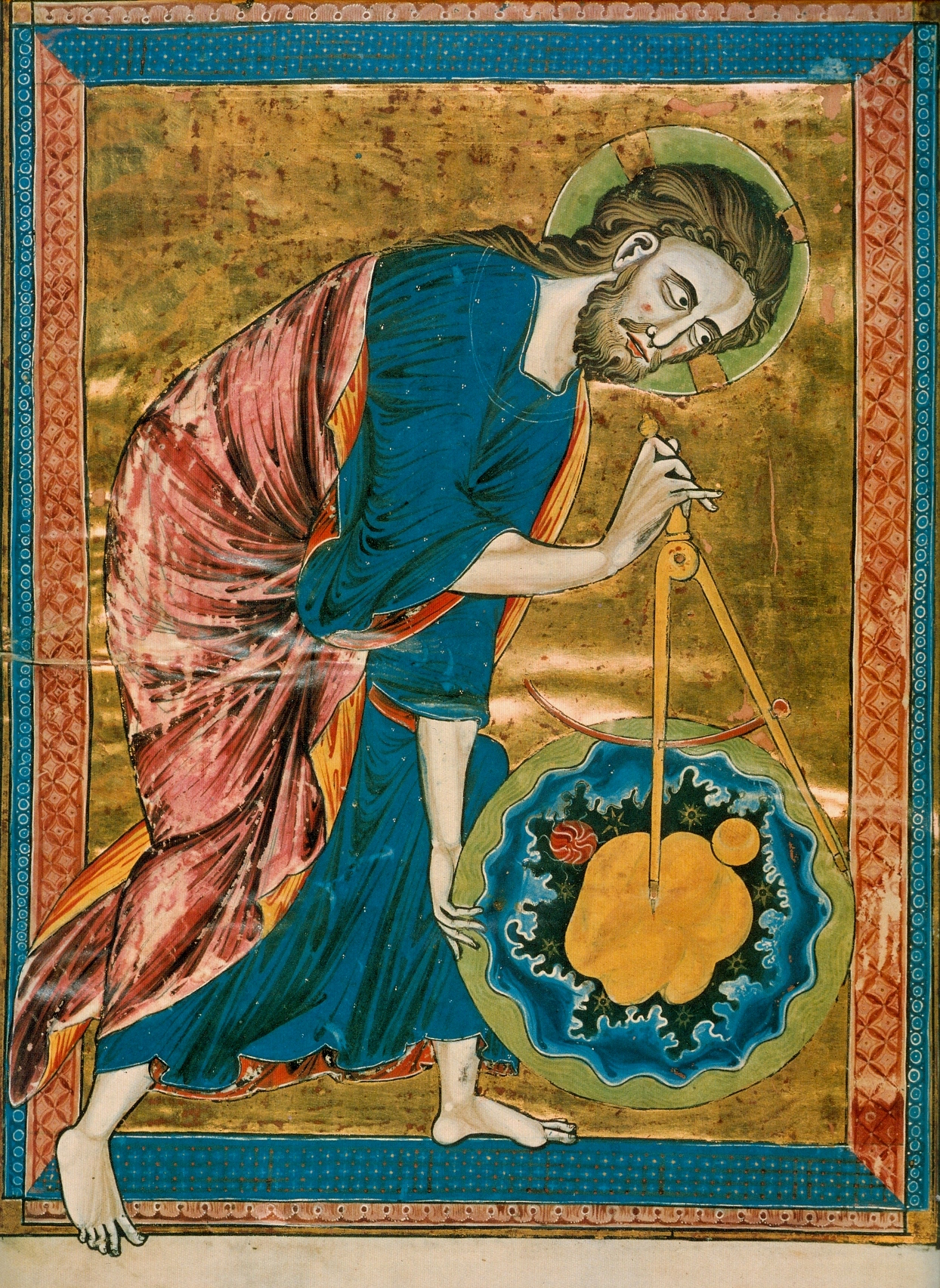
God the geometer. Codex Vindobonensis, c. 1220

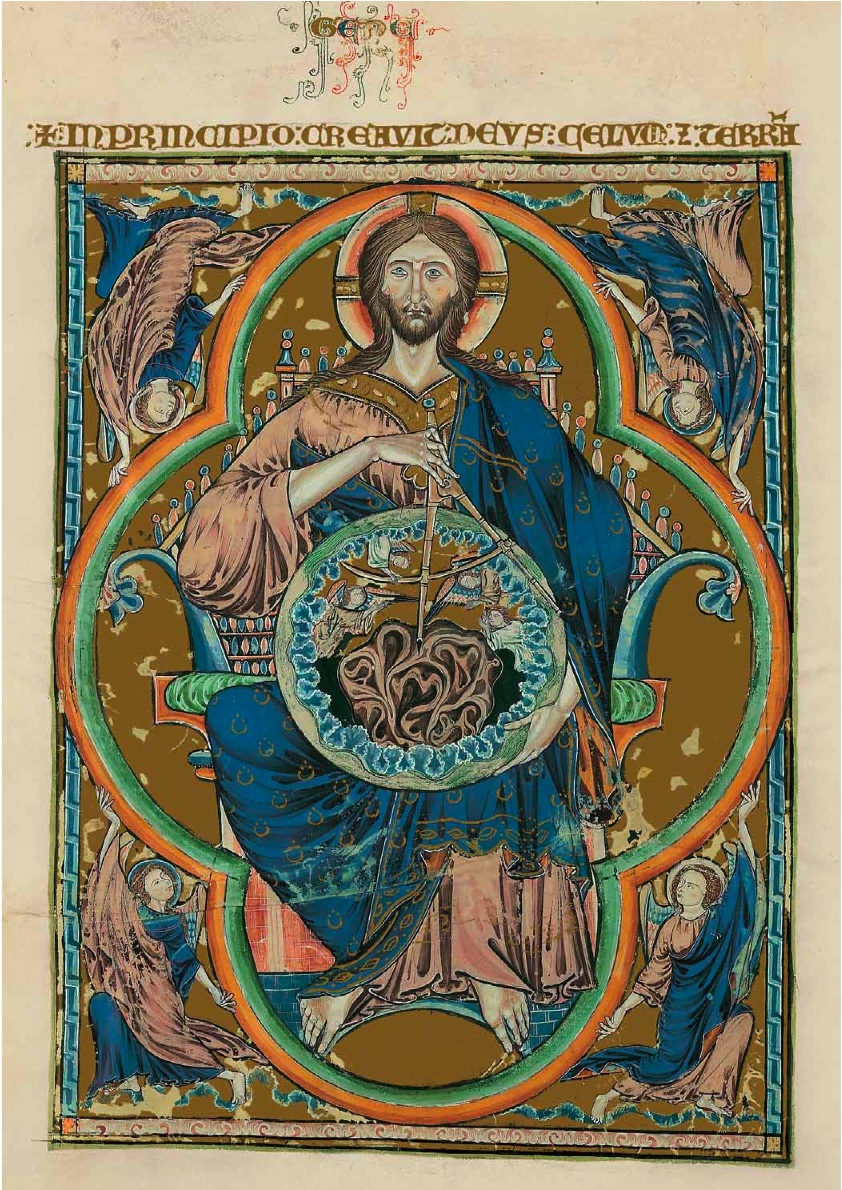
The creation, with the Pantocrator bearing. Bible of St Louis, c. 1220–1240

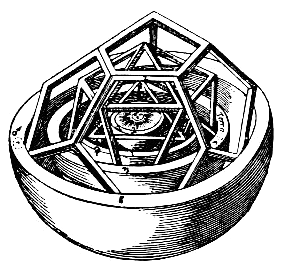
Johannes Kepler's Platonic solid model of planetary spacing in the Solar System from Mysterium Cosmographicum, 1596

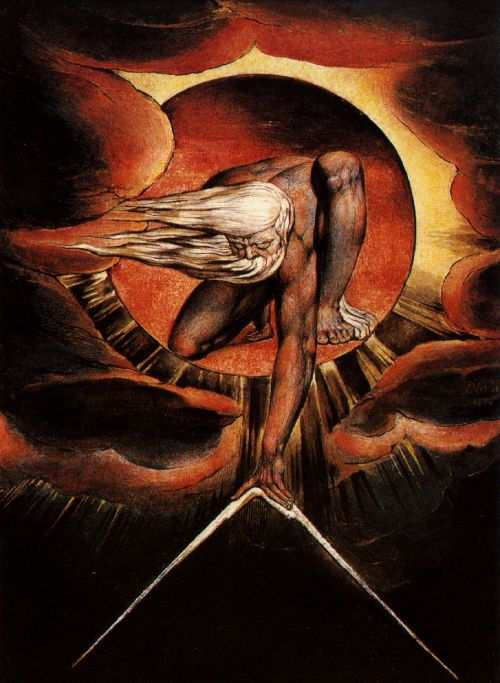
William Blake's The Ancient of Days, 1794

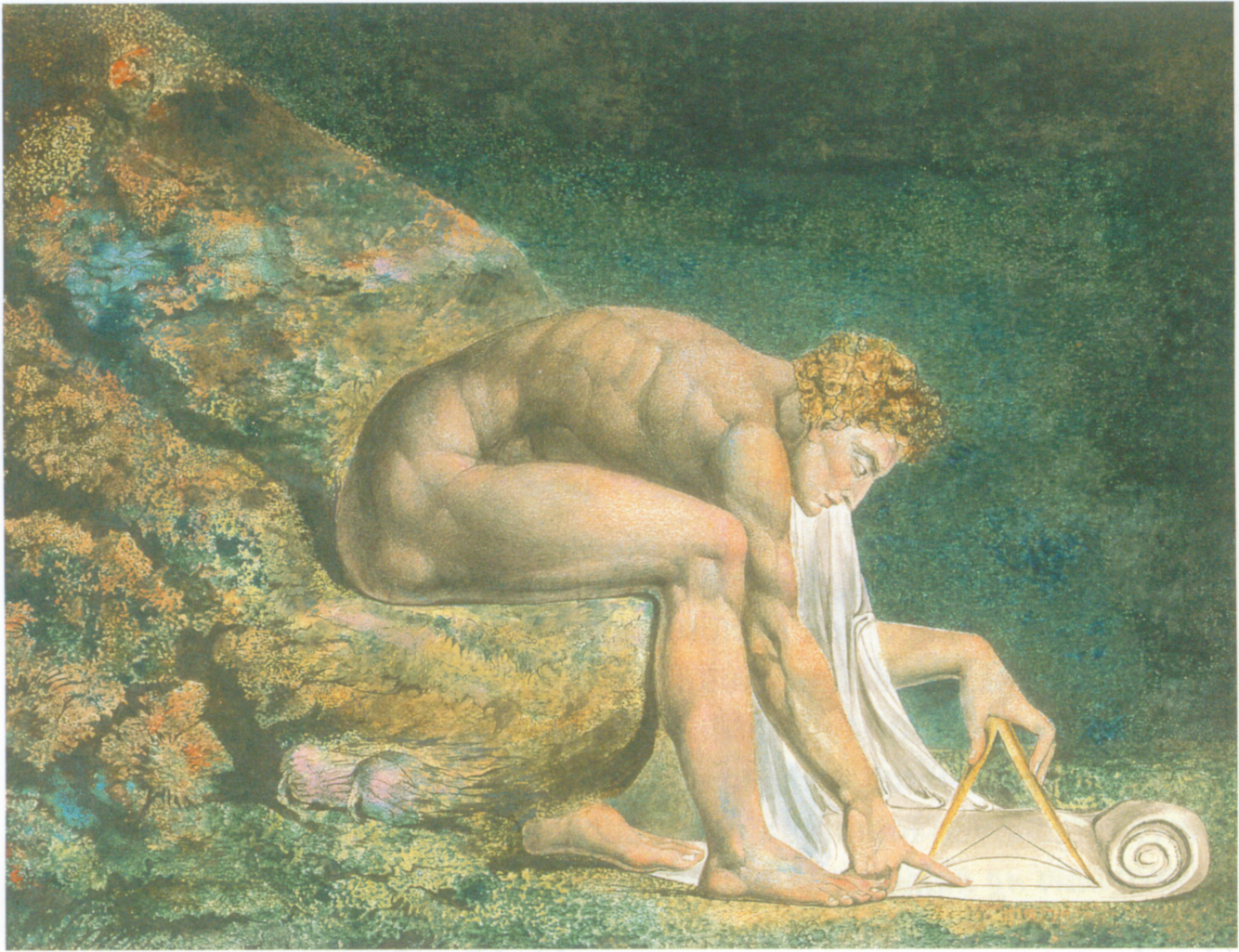
William Blake's Newton, c. 1800

== See also ==
- List of mathematical art software
- Mathematics and architecture
- Music and mathematics
