= List of mathematical artists =

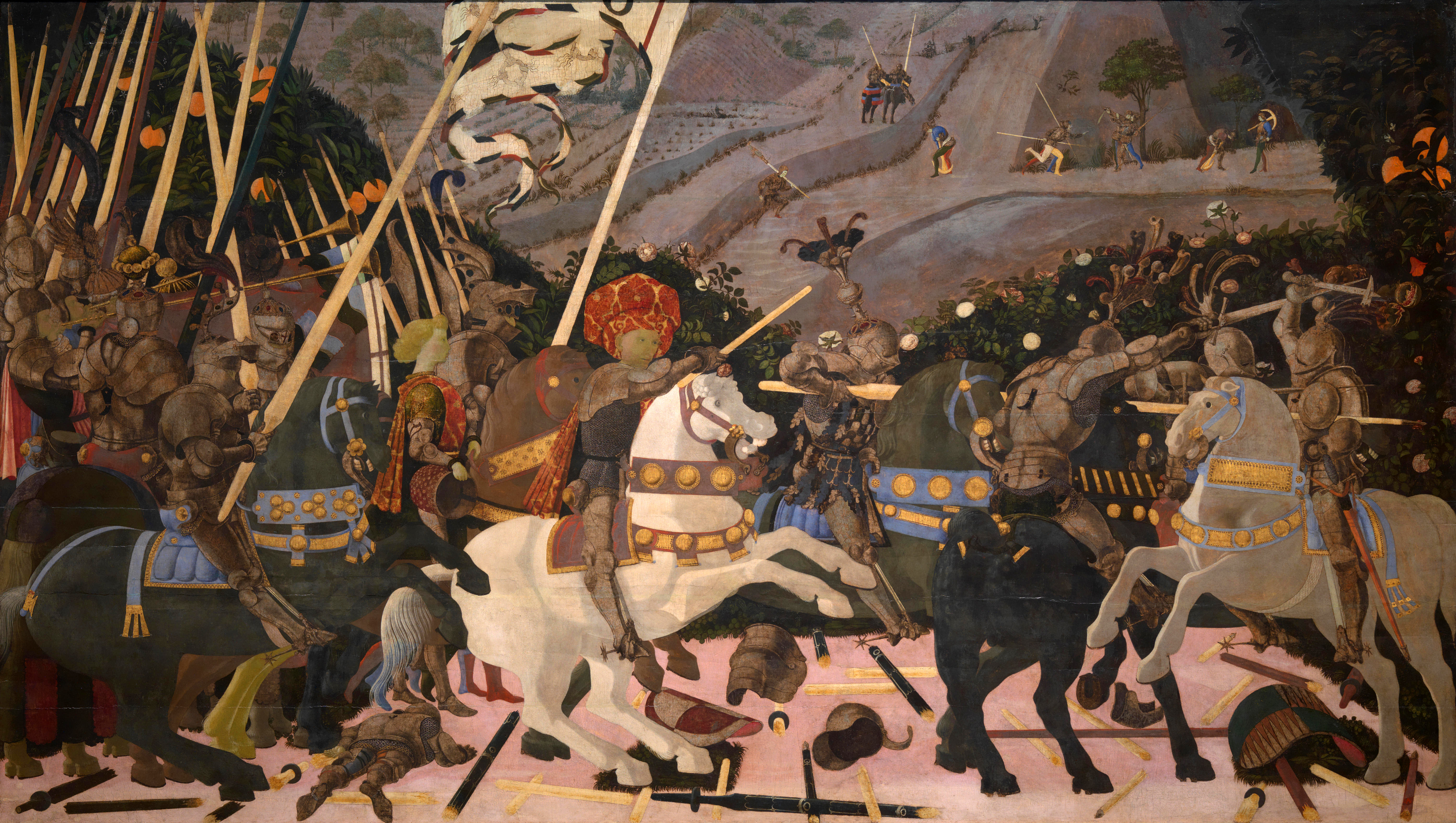
Broken lances lying along perspective lines in Paolo Uccello's The Battle of San Romano, 1438

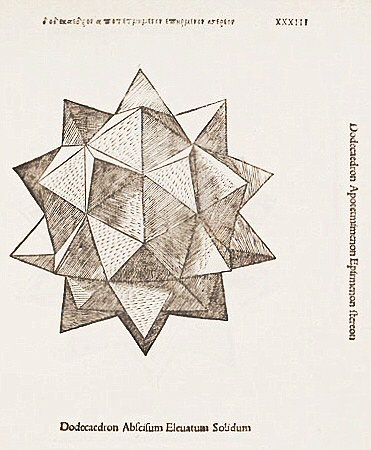
"Dodecaedron Abscisum Elevatum Solidum" woodcut by Leonardo da Vinci, from Luca Pacioli's De divina proportione (Venice, 1509) – an "elevated" icosidodecahedron that is augmented with pyramids made of triangles.

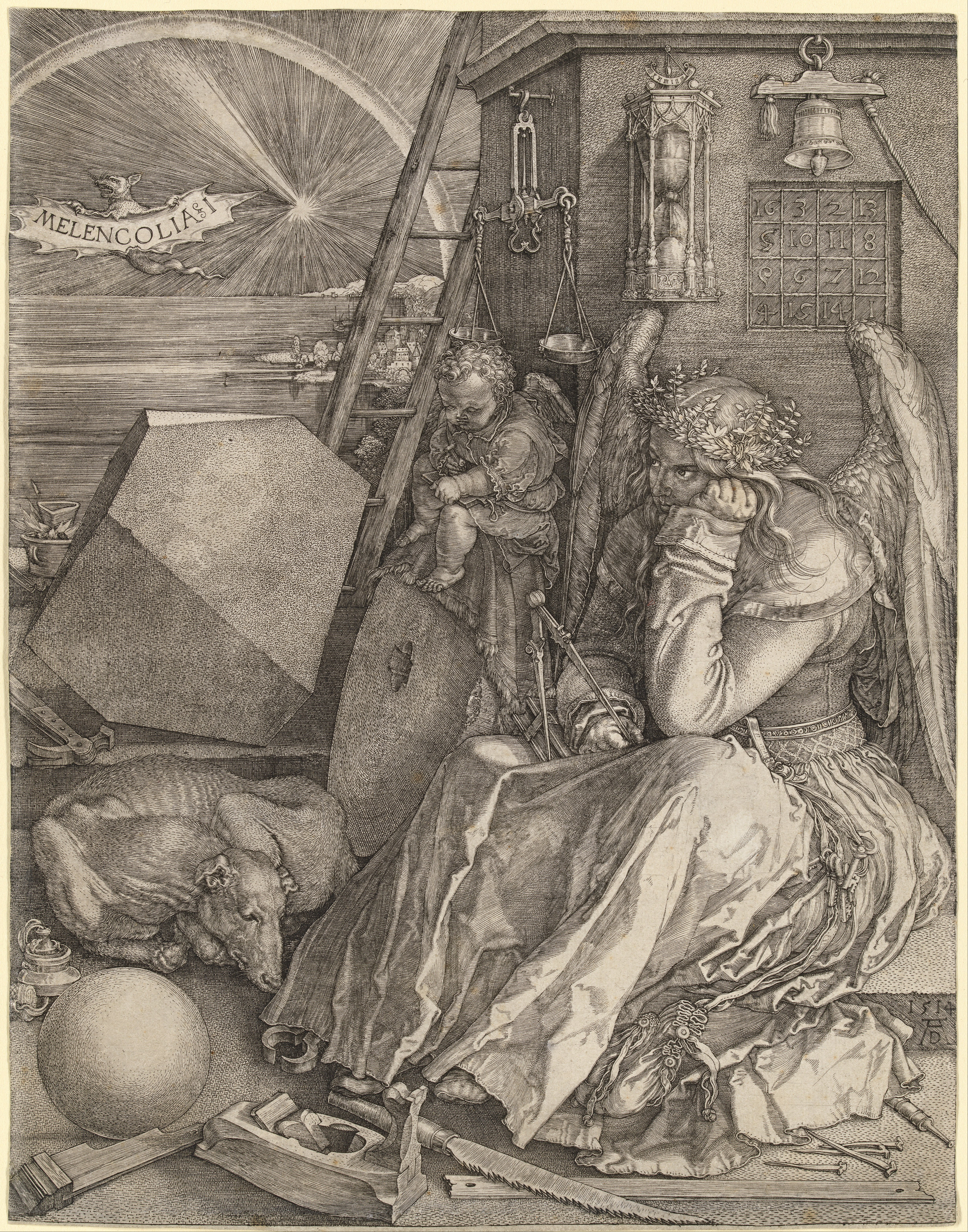
Albrecht Dürer's 1514 engraving Melencolia, with a truncated triangular trapezohedron and a magic square

Rencontre dans la porte tournante by Man Ray, 1922, with helix

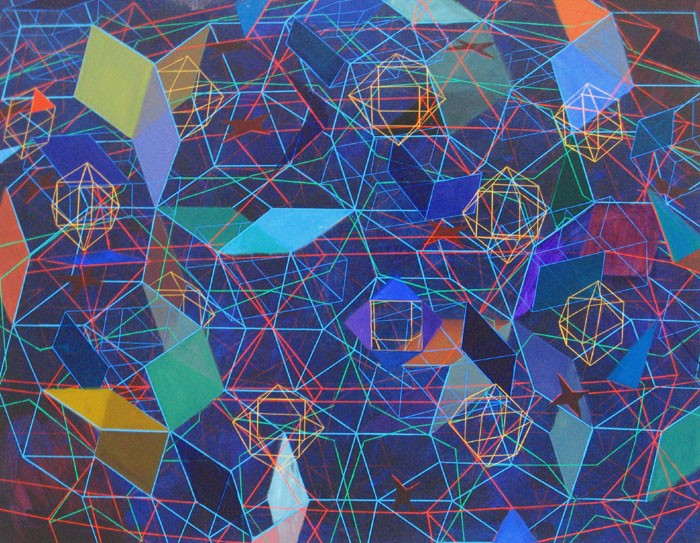
Four-dimensional geometry in Painting 2006-7 by Tony Robbin

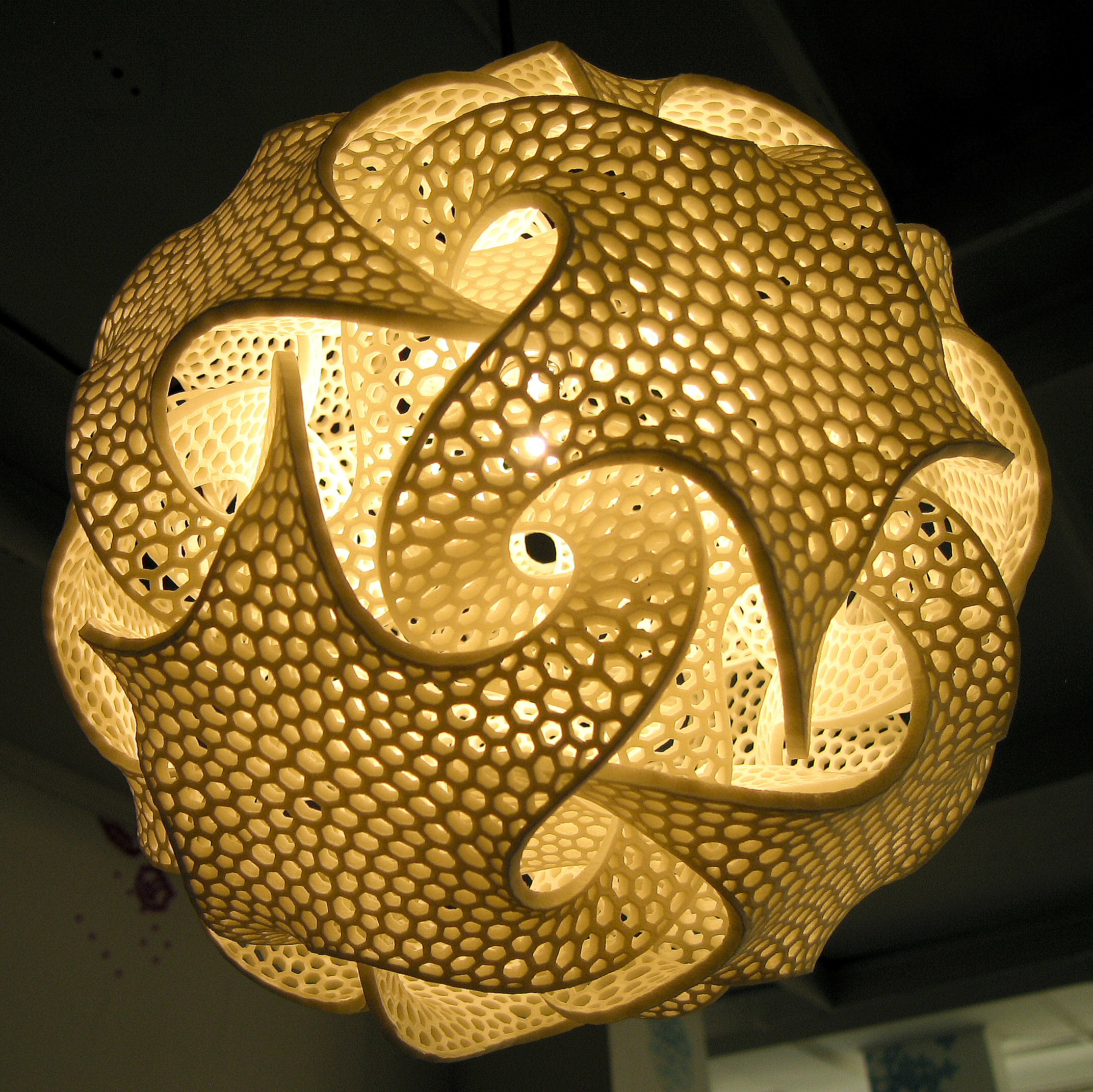
Quintrino by Bathsheba Grossman, 2007, a sculpture with dodecahedral symmetry

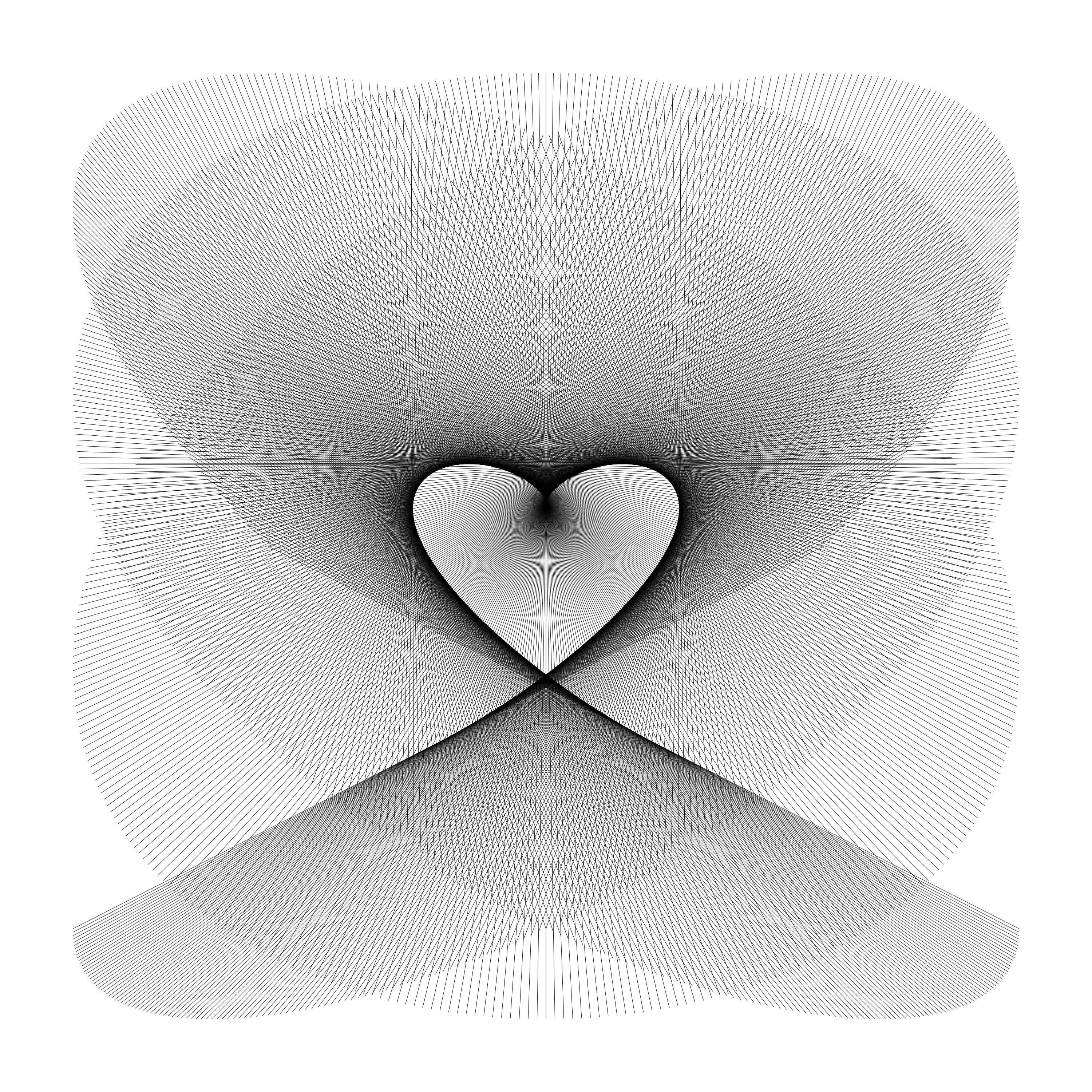
Heart by Hamid Naderi Yeganeh, 2014, using a family of trigonometric equations

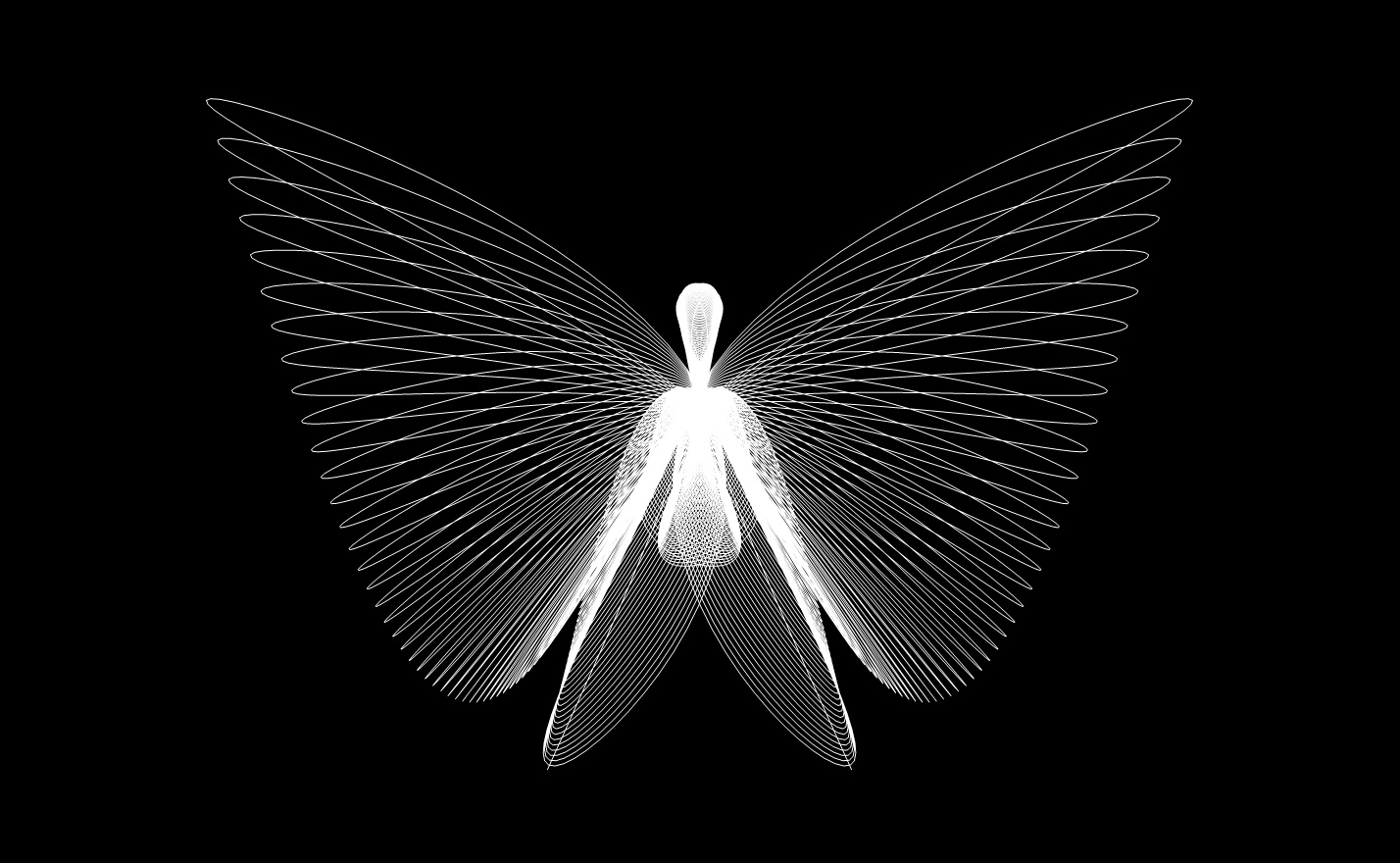
"Angel V" of Mikołaj Jakub Kosmalski - A cubic curve formed on a finite set of points generated by a parametric formula using trigonometric functions and operations on complex numbers

This is a list of artists who actively explored mathematics in their artworks. Art forms practised by these artists include painting, sculpture, architecture, textiles and origami.

Some artists such as Piero della Francesca and Luca Pacioli went so far as to write books on mathematics in art. Della Francesca wrote books on solid geometry and the emerging field of perspective, including De Prospectiva Pingendi (On Perspective for Painting), Trattato d’Abaco (Abacus Treatise), and De corporibus regularibus (Regular Solids), while Pacioli wrote De divina proportione (On Divine Proportion), with illustrations by Leonardo da Vinci, at the end of the fifteenth century.

Merely making accepted use of some aspect of mathematics such as perspective does not qualify an artist for admission to this list.

The term "fine art" is used conventionally to cover the output of artists who produce a combination of paintings, drawings and sculptures.

== List ==
Mathematical artists
Artist	Dates	Artform	Contribution to mathematical art
Calatrava, Santiago	1951–	Architecture	Mathematically-based architecture
Della Francesca, Piero	1420–1492	Fine art	Mathematical principles of perspective in art; his books include De prospectiva pingendi (On perspective for painting), Trattato d’Abaco (Abacus treatise), and De corporibus regularibus (Regular solids)
Demaine, Erik and Martin	1981–	Origami	"Computational origami": mathematical curved surfaces in self-folding paper sculptures
Dietz, Ada	1882–1950	Textiles	Weaving patterns based on the expansion of multivariate polynomials
Draves, Scott	1968–	Digital art	Video art, VJing
Dürer, Albrecht	1471–1528	Fine art	Mathematical theory of proportion
Ernest, John	1922–1994	Fine art	Use of group theory, self-replicating shapes in art
Escher, M. C.	1898–1972	Fine art	Exploration of tessellations, hyperbolic geometry, assisted by the geometer H. S. M. Coxeter
Farmanfarmaian, Monir	1922–2019	Fine art	Geometric constructions exploring the infinite, especially mirror mosaics
Ferguson, Helaman	1940–	Digital art	Algorist, Digital artist
Fomenko, Anatoly	1940-	Illustration	Fantastical illustrations representing concepts from the mathematical field of topology
Forakis, Peter	1927–2009	Sculpture	Pioneer of geometric forms in sculpture
Grossman, Bathsheba	1966–	Sculpture	Sculpture based on mathematical structures
Hart, George W.	1955–	Sculpture	Sculptures of 3-dimensional tessellations (lattices)
Radoslav Rochallyi	1980–	Fine art	Equations-inspired mathematical visual art including mathematical structures.
Hill, Anthony	1930–	Fine art	Geometric abstraction in Constructivist art
Leonardo da Vinci	1452–1519	Fine art	Mathematically-inspired proportion, including golden ratio (used as golden rectangles)
Longhurst, Robert	1949–	Sculpture	Sculptures of minimal surfaces, saddle surfaces, and other mathematical concepts
Man Ray	1890–1976	Fine art	Photographs and paintings of mathematical models in Dada and Surrealist art
Naderi Yeganeh, Hamid	1990–	Fine art	Exploration of tessellations (resembling rep-tiles)
Pacioli, Luca	1447–1517	Fine art	Polyhedra (e.g. rhombicuboctahedron) in Renaissance art; proportion, in his book De divina proportione
Perry, Charles O.	1929–2011	Sculpture	Mathematically-inspired sculpture
Robbin, Tony	1943–	Fine art	Painting, sculpture and computer visualizations of four-dimensional geometry
Ri Ekl	1984–	Visual computer poetry	Geometry-inspired poetry
Saiers, Nelson	2014–	Fine art	Mathematical concepts (toposes, Brown representability, Euler's identity, etc) play a central role in his artwork.
Séquin, Carlo	1941–	Digital art	computer graphics, geometric modelling, and sculpture
Sugimoto, Hiroshi	1948–	Photography, sculpture	Photography and sculptures of mathematical models, inspired by the work of Man Ray and Marcel Duchamp
Taimina, Daina	1954–	Textiles	Crochets of hyperbolic space
Thorsteinn, Einar	1942–2015	Architecture	Mathematically-inspired sculpture and architecture with polyhedral, spherical shapes and tensile structures
Uccello, Paolo	1397–1475	Fine art	Innovative use of perspective grid, objects as mathematical solids (e.g. lances as cones)
Kosmalski, Mikołaj Jakub	1986	Digital art	Exploration of spreadsheet software capabilities (OO Calc and MS Excel), generation of finite sets of points by parametric formulas, connecting these points by curved (usually cubic) and broken lines.
Verhoeff, Jacobus	1927–2018	Sculpture	Escher-inspired mathematical sculptures such as lattice configurations and fractal formations
Widmark, Anduriel	1987–	Sculpture	Geometric glass sculpture using tetrastix, and knot theory
