= Soon I Will Be Invincible =

2007 novel by Austin Grossman

- US cover of Soon I Will Be Invincible
- Author: Austin Grossman
- Cover artist: Geoff Spear; Chip Kidd; Bryan Hitch
- Language: English
- Genre: Superhero fiction
- Publisher: Pantheon Books
- Publication date: June 5, 2007
- Publication place: United States
- Media type: Print (hardcover); Audiobook
- Pages: 288
- ISBN: 0-375-42486-5

Soon I Will Be Invincible is a novel by Austin Grossman, published by Pantheon Books and released on June 5, 2007. The novel uses two alternating first person narratives—the first told from the point of view of Fatale, a female cyborg recruited by the superhero group The New Champions as they investigate the disappearance of a superhero named CoreFire. The other narrative is told from the point of view of Dr. Impossible, a supervillain possessing super-human strength and intellect who suffers from Malign Hypercognition Disorder ("evil genius" syndrome). The plot follows Impossible's thirteenth attempt to take over the world after escaping from prison.

The novel—Grossman's first—was written during his tenure as a video game designer. The book uses characters, settings, and storylines generally associated with comic books and superhero fiction, but is written entirely in prose. The story explores how superheroes cope with their powers and interact with one another. The potential motivations and perspectives of supervillains are also examined. Grossman's book has been variously described as clever, engaging, and fun—but overstuffed with comic book tropes.

== Background ==
The novel Soon I Will Be Invincible is the first novel by Austin Grossman, an established video games designer. Grossman had come from a literary family, son of Judith and Allen Grossman and brother of Lev Grossman, which had fostered his ambition to write his own novel. Instead, Grossman accepted a job working in the video game medium which he credited with teaching him to realistically portray creative characters and situations. He always had an interest in the superhero genre, citing Alan Moore and Frank Miller as literary influences. In the mid-1990s, the idea behind what would become his first novel came to him in the form of a supervillain's voice. Grossman spent the next few years casually developing the character that would become Dr. Impossible, adding supporting characters, and writing short stories. By 2006, Penguin's imprint Michael Joseph purchased the publishing rights for the UK, as did Rizzoli for an Italian version. By the time the book was being published, Grossman was 37 years old and had entered the University of California-Berkeley's doctoral program studying English Literature, specializing in Romantic and Victorian literature.

== Plot ==
Rainwater is soaking into my costume, seeping through the steel and nylon fibers onto super-hardened skin. I wish I were anywhere but here; I wish I were home. But I'm a supervillain, and I don't have a home, just a space station, or a jail cell, or a base, or a sewer tunnel. I don't have a secret identity; I'm Doctor Impossible just about all the time now.

— Doctor Impossible, Soon I Will Be Invincible, page 123.

After CoreFire, the world's greatest superhero, goes missing, the former members of The Champions re-unite to investigate his disappearance, bringing in two new replacement heroines, Lily and Fatale. They immediately suspect CoreFire's nemesis, Dr. Impossible, was involved, even though he has been incarcerated in a maximum security prison since his defeat by Damsel during his twelfth world domination attempt. An interrogation by two novice heroes about CoreFire's disappearance gives Dr. Impossible the chance to escape and initiate a new attempt at world domination. The New Champions search for Impossible, convinced he is responsible for CoreFire's demise, while he gathers the materials needed to advance his plan. This is intercut with flashbacks to earlier times and his origin, as well as reflections on other paths he could have taken in life.

Fatale observes the actions of the New Champions as its newest member. She feels uncomfortable replacing a popular, deceased member and unworthy of belonging to a superhero group, but she proves herself to be highly competent and earns the respect of her teammates. Fatale's closest friend on the team is another new member, Lily, a reformed supervillain and former girlfriend of Dr. Impossible. Fatale contrasts Dr. Impossible's flashbacks by having no memory of her life before the accident in Brazil that made her a cyborg, with her exposition coming from her new experiences with the other superheroes. During the investigation, she discovers that the corporation that transformed her into a cyborg was a front for Dr. Impossible during one of his previous attempts at world domination.

We all retire for the night, but no one goes right to sleep. I know, because the interior walls here are thin enough that at night when I crank my senses through the right spectra, I can see right through them. I feel a little guilty, of course, but I can't resist. I've heard so many so stories and rumors about this crowd, a tight group for so many years. The actual facts are odd, and a little disappointing.

— Fatale, Soon I Will Be Invincible, page 57.

The climax is reached on Dr. Impossible's island, as he attempts to start a controlled Ice Age, making him Earth's ruler and only source of energy. He almost succeeds, using the hammer formerly belonging to the supervillain The Pharaoh to defeat the New Champions. CoreFire suddenly returns but is also unsuccessful against Dr. Impossible. Lily, who had quit the team earlier, eventually returns and defeats Dr. Impossible. Lily reveals that she is actually Erica Lowenstein, Dr. Impossible's childhood crush before his transformation and frequent kidnapee when she was the girlfriend of CoreFire. In the final chapter, Dr. Impossible ponders what it truly means to conquer the world, and whether such a feat can really be achieved, as he prepares for yet another escape from custody to start the cycle all over again with a new plan.

== Main characters ==
- Dr. Impossible, the supervillain narrator. The novel chronicles his escape from maximum security prison and his thirteenth attempt at world conquest. He is the "smartest man in the world." A lab accident involving 'zeta radiation' gave him superpowers, consisting of super-reflexes, reasonable super-strength, and toughened skin. He was diagnosed with Malign Hypercognition Disorder. He is a pastiche of Lex Luthor and Doctor Doom.
- Fatale, the superhero narrator. A rookie hero recruited by the New Champions, she is a cyborg, the result of experimental surgery following a near-fatal accident in São Paulo. She eventually discovers that the corporation responsible for creating and maintaining her cybernetic parts was a cover for one of Doctor Impossible's schemes. For a time she worked National Security Agency missions. She is a pastiche of Cyborg and Tomorrow Woman.

=== The New Champions ===
UK cover by Bryan Hitch.

- Fatale, a superhero recruited by the New Champions and the narrator of the superhero-half of the novel. She is a cyborg, the result of experimental surgery following a near-fatal accident in São Paulo. She eventually discovers that the corporation responsible for creating and maintaining her cybernetic parts was a cover for one of Doctor Impossible's schemes. For a time she worked National Security Agency missions.
- Damsel, a Wonder Woman-like character. She is the leader of both the original Champions and the New Champions. She is the daughter of a golden age superhero and a princess of an alien planet. She is also Blackwolf's ex-wife. Her powers are flight, super-strength, micro-vision, and a protective forcefield.
- Blackwolf, co-founder of the Champions and Damsel's ex-husband. A Batman-like character, he is the team's only unpowered member, but he is athletically trained and intellectually gifted. He is motivated by the death of family members and has mild autism. He divides his time between managing his successful corporation and work as a superhero.
- Feral, a half-human/half-tiger. He is the only member of the team who still patrols and fights street crime.
- Elphin, the last fairy on Earth. Though born in the 10th century, she continues to have the appearance of a teenager but with insectoid wings. Inhumanly fast and strong, she uses a magical spear as a weapon and has some nature-controlling powers.
- Mr. Mystic, a magician. He was a stage magician before travelling the world and discovering the secret of true magic. He wears a tuxedo and top hat as his costume. His powers are undefined but include illusion and teleportation. Real name is William Zard.
- Rainbow Triumph, a teenage girl given experimental treatment for her terminal illness. The treatment saved her life and gave her superpowers, such as super-speed, but she needs to keep taking her medicine every few hours or she will die.
- Lily, a reformed supervillainess and former girlfriend of Dr. Impossible and CoreFire. She claims to come from the far future, having been sent back to prevent an ecological disaster that would destroy humanity. However, she later is revealed to be Erica Lowenstein, the Lois Lane-like one-time girlfriend of CoreFire. She is super-strong, invulnerable and transparent.

== Style and themes ==
The story is divided into 21 chapters, with each chapter switching between the points-of-view of the supervillain Dr. Impossible and the superhero Fatale. The narrative is written in the first person, like a memoir, describing the inner monologues of the two protagonists. The dual narrative foils and "blur[s] the distinction" between the superheroes and the supervillain. The language was described as having a "sincere tone of glory" and "boyish indulgence" with "an undercurrent of sadness and a surprisingly human universality". While the story uses standard comic book story elements, like superheroes fighting supervillains, the book is written entirely in prose. The story combines a satire of superhero archetypes and comic book clichés, such as the use of many superlatives, with realist elements that portray the sometimes mundane lives and everyday challenges of its characters, like coping with cybernetic body parts that weigh far more than a natural body and that react before the brain registers what is happening. Common social situations and psychological issues, like loneliness and trying to connect with a group, are also portrayed. Reviewers identified numerous themes, such as power, greed, fame, ego, loneliness, belonging, and identity.

=== Characterization of superheroes ===
The novel uses characters with generic superhero traits. While they are public celebrities for being heroes, the novel deals more with the personal lives of superheroes, how they cope with their powers and interact with one another. The character Fatale, being asked to join the New Champions superhero group, is used as a "useful outsider looking in" behind the scenes. They exist in a "cult of overachievement", constantly competing and trying to distinguish themselves from one another, which results in characters as "colorful as playing cards but all from different decks, a jumble of incompatible suits and denominations dealt out for an 'Alice in Wonderland' game." Despite their celebrity status and heroic facade, they exist in a "mundane reality" with a normal routine; as the villain devises new means of committing crimes and conquering the world, the heroes chat among themselves, reliving past adventures, and practice fighting one another. From the perspective of the supervillain Dr. Impossible, superheroes live in "a dumb, hackneyed world".

=== Characterization of the supervillain ===
Dr. Impossible is used as an archetype or stock character supervillain. He is characterized as an evil genius or mad scientist who continually attempts to take control of the world's population. This is seen as a sub-type of the hero's journey and his calm deconstruction of his own futile, repetitive and self-destructive behaviours is compared to existentialist literature. The supervillains, especially Dr. Impossible, are portrayed as sympathetic characters afflicted with "Malign Hypercognition Disorder", a psychological condition which makes highly intelligent people use their advantages to perform non-virtuous, or evil, actions. Grossman explained that from Dr. Impossible's point of view, he is not inherently evil but rejects societal norms: "it's a matter of integrity — he's sticking to his principles, doing science his own way, pursuing his goals — even if it means the entire world is against him, even if he looks ridiculous in his costume, even if he knows he's going to lose. The superheroes are taking the conformist path, and getting all the applause." From the literary point of view, Grossman believes the supervillains are more interesting characters, "they are usually the most dynamic characters and the most creative. ... Their plans usually start with a great invention, which gives the story all its color and energy. The hero just has to come in and smash it up." Grossman admitted that much of the Dr. Impossible character was inspired by his feelings as a graduate student, "On the one hand, you're supposed to be really smart, and on the other hand, it's a humiliating experience. You're psyched about your intellect and kind of arrogant, but at the same time, you're [insignificant] in the eyes of the world."

=== Genre ===
Soon I Will Be Invincible takes characters, settings, and storylines generally associated with the comic book format and re-casts them using the novel's prose format. This use of superhero fiction in an alternate format was compared to other similar, successful attempts, like Sam Raimi's Spider-Man films, Brad Bird's The Incredibles, and the TV serial No Heroics. Several reviewers contrasted the novel's elements of realism with Alan Moore's Watchmen and Rick Veitch's Bratpack which portrayed a darker side of more realistic superheroes. Novels cited as being similar included Donald Barthelme's Snow White, Robert Coover's Stepmother, and the works of Michael Chabon and Jonathan Lethem. The novel format allowed for more character development, which Grossman took advantage of by portraying them as "real, human characters, with all of the foibles that come with the territory" in what one reviewer called a "hybridization of character and genre". Grossman described it as "a book about real people who happen to be superheros [sic] or supervillains" and that if it were a comic, it would be "page after page of thought balloons". Compared to comic stories, the reviewer for the Richmond Times-Dispatch wrote "The common denominator for most superhero comic books is that they don't make fun of themselves - the believability of their stories is never called into question. They take the heroes seriously. Not so in literature. When a novel appears with comic books as its focus, its author will undoubtedly believe that his or her theme is far more important - far more serious - than the comic books that inspired them. ... tries to do it all, combining humor and comic-book adventure with a literary sense of character. ...The result is a postmodern, inventive, comic-book plot with literary aspirations, and its only problem is that it isn't entirely successful as either humor or as straight adventure."

== Publication and reception ==
Soon I Will Be Invincible was published by Pantheon Books, an imprint of the Knopf Doubleday division of Random House, and released on June 5, 2007, as a hardcover. In the UK it was published by the Penguin Group imprint Michael Joseph. An audiobook was released at the same time featuring the voices of J. Paul Boehmer and Coleen Marlo. Grossman promoted the book by attending book signings in major American cities. In the UK it was promoted by wrapping telephone booths in advertising, in reference to Superman changing outfits in such booths. The cover art, which features photos of stereotypical comic book character clothing like a mask and gloves, by Chip Kidd was called "excellent...[and] sure to attract readers". By contrast, Bryan Hitch's cover art on the British edition, which features hand-drawn illustrations of the book's characters, was called "counter-productive...[or] unnecessary" due to its graphical interpretations of characters that were deliberately written in prose only. The book was short-listed for the 2007 John Sargent Sr. First Novel Prize. Work on a film adaption began in 2008 through Strike Entertainment with scripts being written Dan Weiss and Grossman.

Several reviewers described book as clever, well written, engaging, amusing, and fun. The prose was described as "effortless", "colorful", "kinetic and often witty". Numerous reviewers thought the Dr. Impossible character was the highlight of the novel. The Library Journal review "highly recommended [the novel] for all public libraries" calling it "fun and thought-provoking book". In The New York Times Book Review reviewer Dave Itzkoff wrote that the novel "can't completely measure up [to other superhero fiction and film], but its ambition and persistence in the face of formidable odds make it an admirable addition to the genre". The Publishers Weekly review noted that the comic book scenario written in a prose novel, with "thoughtfully portrayed" characters, would broaden the appeal of the genre. Similarly, regarding the comic book set-up written in prose, Mat Johnson in USA Today wrote that Grossman's "fabulist vision is meticulously captured so that it might be gleefully explored, nostalgically, within its traditional boundaries". Journalist Carlo Wolff wrote that "it takes some time to engage because...Grossman is so enamored of the worlds he's fashioning that he overstuffs them...[but it] is a fresh, warm take on comic books, science fiction and pop culture." The Kirkus Reviews summary notes that the action scenes are "unimpressive, interrupted by more talk as...the battle seesaws in an arbitrary fashion. For all the special effects, a debut novel that's lifeless and inert." Both the reviewers for Entertainment Weekly and Christian Science Monitor gave the book a "B" grade, though The A.V. Club gave it an "A" grade. It is currently ranked #2 as the Best Superhero fiction Books on ListNerd.

A musical theater adaptation of Soon I Will Be Invincible ran at Lifeline Theatre in Chicago from May to July, 2015.
