= Mathematical sculpture =

Sculpture conceived via mathematics

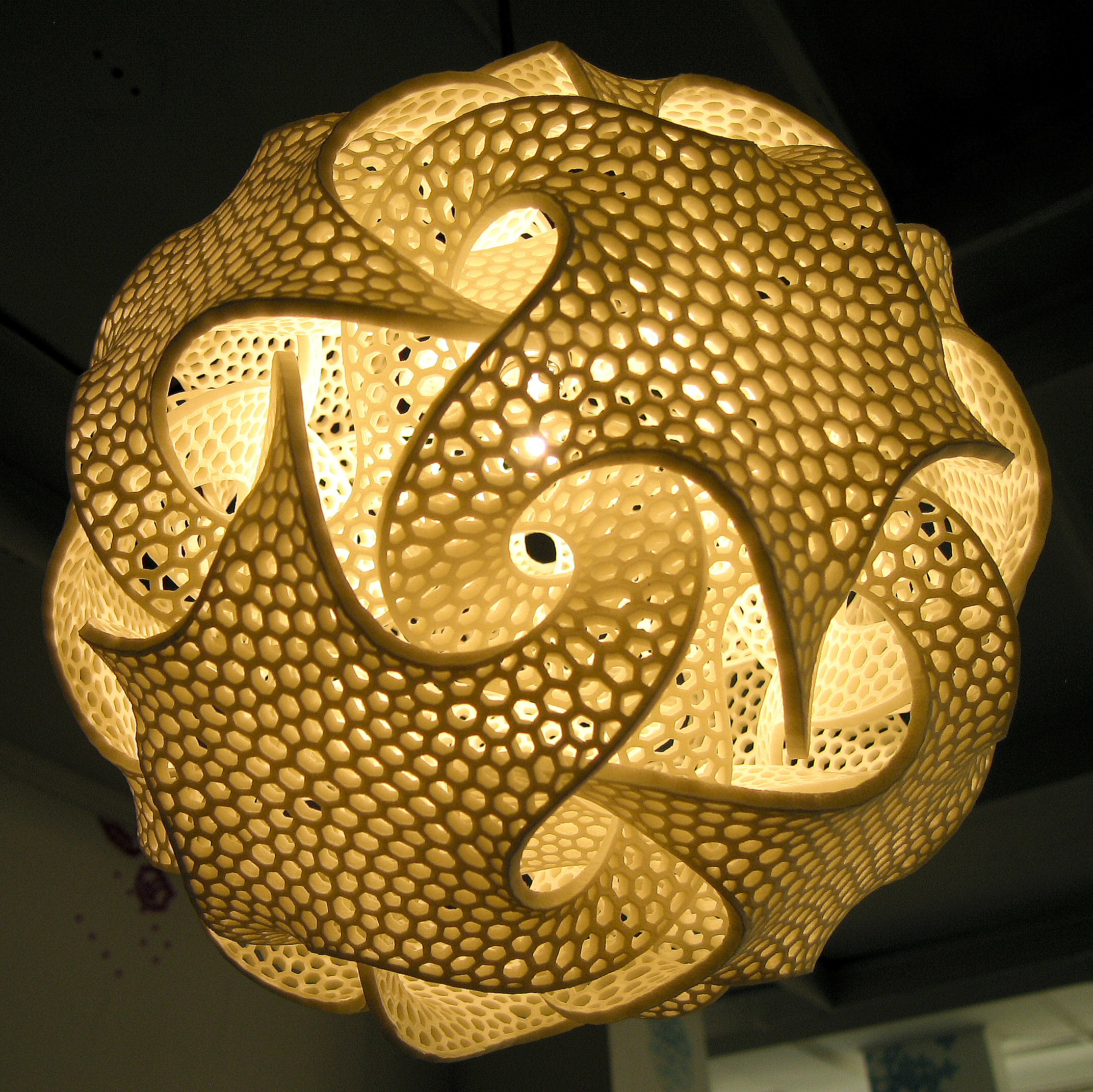
Mathematical sculpture by Bathsheba Grossman, 2007

A mathematical sculpture is a sculpture which uses mathematics as an essential concept. Helaman Ferguson, George W. Hart, Bathsheba Grossman, Peter Forakis and Jacobus Verhoeff are well-known mathematical sculptors.

== Bibliography ==
- Makariou, Sophie (writer of foreword): Toshimasa Kikuchi: Objets mathématiques - Mathematical objects. Exh. cat. for exhibition held at the Musée Guimet, Paris, 7 July - 4 October 2021. Paris: Galerie Mingei, 2021 ISBN 978-2-9566150-3-3 OCLC 1268517010
- Wenninger, Magnus: Polyhedron Models. Cambridge: Cambridge University Press, 1971 ISBN 978-0-521-09859-5
