= Bulletin of the Iranian Mathematical Society =

Journal of the Iranian Mathematical Society

- Discipline: Mathematics
- Language: English
- Edited by: Majid Gazor

Publication details
- History: 1974–present
- Publisher: Springer, on behalf of the Iranian Mathematical Society
- Frequency: Bimonthly
- Impact factor: 1.2 (2025)

Standard abbreviations
- ISO 4: Bull. Iran. Math. Soc.

Indexing
- ISSN: 1017-060X (print); 1735-8515 (web)

Links
- Journal homepage

The Bulletin of the Iranian Mathematical Society is a journal publication from the Iranian Mathematical Society. It has been continuously published papers in the English language since 1974. This journal has been indexed by many major indexing data bases such as zbMATH Open, Mathematical Reviews, Scopus, Science Citation Index Expanded, Islamic World Science Citation Database, etc It covers most areas of mathematics.

== Editors-in-Chief ==
- Majid Gazor 2022-now
- Majid Soleimani-Damaneh 2019-2022
- Hamid Reza Ebrahimi-Vishki 2016-2019
- Abbas Salemi Parizi 2013-2016
- Alireza Ashrafi 2011-2013
- Mohammad Sal Moslehian 2010-2011
- Saeed Azam 2008-2010
- Rahim Zaare-Nahandi 2001-2007
- Mehdi Radjabalipour 2000-2001
- Mohammad Reza Darafsheh 1995-1999
- Mehdi Radjabalipour 1991-1994
- Karim Seddighi 1989-1990
- Ahmad Haghani 1987-1988
- Gholamreza Dargahi-Noubary 1983-1986
- Javad Hamedanizadeh 1979-1983
- Mohammad Reza Noori Moghadam 1977-1979
- Siavash Shahshahani 1976-1977
- Mohammad Gholi Javanshir 1973-1975

== The Shahshahani Prize ==
The Shahshahani Prize, established in 2023, is awarded annually to recognize two outstanding research papers published in the journal from the preceding two years. The prize acknowledges innovation, significance, clarity, and potential impact, with selections made by the journal's editorial board and prize committee.

The prize is named after Siavash Shahshahani, a prominent Iranian mathematician who earned his Ph.D. from the University of California, Berkeley, under the supervision of Stephen Smale. Shahshahani returned to Iran in 1974 to join the faculty at Sharif University of Technology. He has worked in advancing mathematics in Iran, notably as the founding editor of Nashr-e Riazi, and as the second editor-in-chief of BIMS, where he focused the journal exclusively on research publications. He was also instrumental in founding the Institute for Research in Fundamental Sciences and contributed to Iran's early internet infrastructure.

The Shahshahani Prize honors his legacy within the Iranian mathematical community.

=== 2025 Shahshahani Prize Winners ===
1. Hailong Dao and David Eisenbud, Burch Index, Summands of Syzygies and Linearity in Resolutions, Bull. Iran. Math. Soc. (2023) 49:10.
2. Federico Bambozzi, Tomoki Mihara, Derived Analytic Geometry for Z-Valued Functions Part I: Topological Properties, Bull. Iran. Math. Soc. (2024) 50:58.

=== 2024 Shahshahani Prize Winners ===
1. Amnon Neeman, An improvement on the base-change theorem and the functor f^!, Bull. Iran. Math. Soc. (2023) 49:25.
2. Peter J. Olver, Invariants of finite and discrete group actions via moving frames, Bull. Iran. Math. Soc. (2023) 49:11.

=== 2023 Shahshahani Prize Winners ===
1. Karl-Hermann Neeb, Daniel Oeh, Elements in pointed invariant cones in Lie algebras and corresponding affine pairs. Bull. Iran. Math. Soc. 48, No 1, 295-330 (2022).
2. Joel Merker, Vanishing Hachtroudi curvature and local equivalence to the Heisenberg pseudosphere. Bull. Iran. Math. Soc. 47, No. 6, 1775-1792 (2021).

== See also ==
- Javad Mashreghi, an editor of the journal
- Cumrun Vafa, an advisory board member
- Freydoon Shahidi, an advisory board member
- Maryam Mirzakhani, Fields Medal 2014, a former editor of this journal.
