= Banach Journal of Mathematical Analysis =

- Discipline: Functional analysis, operator theory
- Language: English
- Edited by: Mohammad Sal Moslehian

Publication details
- History: 2007–present
- Publisher: Tusi Mathematical Research Group
- Frequency: Quarterly

Standard abbreviations
- ISO 4: Banach J. Math. Anal.

Indexing
- ISSN: 1735-8787 (print); 2662-2033 (web)

Links
- Journal homepage; Online access

The Banach Journal of Mathematical Analysis is a peer-reviewed mathematics journal founded by Professor Mohammad Sal Moslehian and published by Tusi Mathematical Research Group in cooperation with Springer (Birkhäuser). It was established in 2006. The journal publishes articles on functional analysis and operator theory and related topics.

== Abstracting and indexing ==
The journal is abstracted and indexed in Scopus, Science Citation Index Expanded, Mathematical Reviews, and Zentralblatt MATH. The journal is included in the Reference List Journal of MathSciNet published by the American Mathematical Society. Two other related journals are Annals of Functional Analysis and Advances in Operator Theory.
