= Advances in Operator Theory =

Mathematics Journal

- Discipline: Functional analysis, operator theory
- Language: English
- Edited by: Mohammad Sal Moslehian

Publication details
- History: 2016–present
- Publisher: Birkhäuser on behalf of the Tusi Mathematical Research Group
- Frequency: Quarterly

Standard abbreviations
- ISO 4: Adv. Oper. Theory

Indexing
- ISSN: 2662-2009 (print); 2538-225X (web)
- OCLC no.: 1224060607

Links
- Journal homepage; Online access

Advances in Operator Theory is a peer-reviewed scientific journal established in 2016 by Mohammad Sal Moslehian and published by Birkhäuser on behalf of the Tusi Mathematical Research Group. It covers functional analysis and operator theory and related topics.

== Abstracting and indexing ==
The journal is abstracted and indexed in Scopus, MathSciNet, Emerging Sources Citation Index, and Zentralblatt MATH.

== See also ==
- Annals of Functional Analysis
- Banach Journal of Mathematical Analysis
