= Mohammad Sal Moslehian =

Iranian mathematician (born 1966)

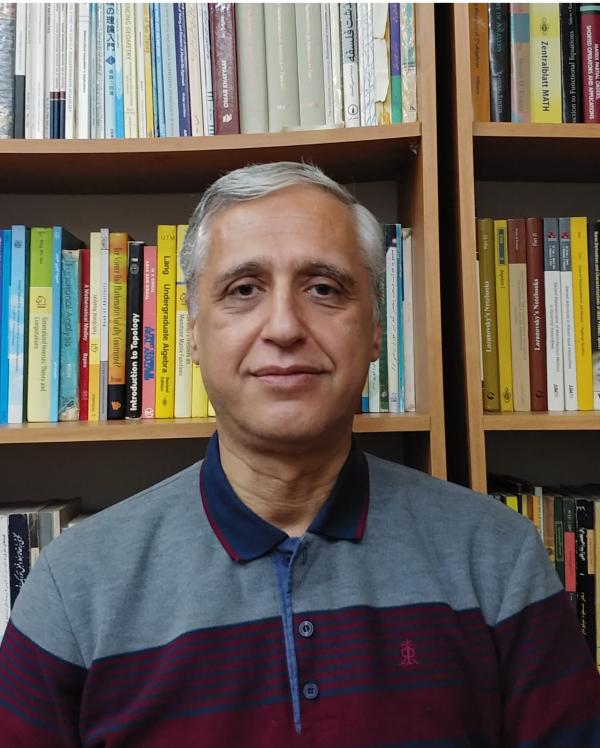
- Born: 21 March 1966 (age 60); Mashhad, Iran
- Known for: Theory of operator and norm inequalities
- Spouse: Maryam Amyari
- Children: Anahita Sal Moslehian, Arash Sal Moslehian
- Scientific career
- Fields: Mathematics
- Workplaces: Ferdowsi University of Mashhad
- Thesis: Homology and Local Cohomology for Banach Algebras (1999)
- Doctoral advisor: Assadollah Niknam

Mohammad Sal Moslehian (محمد صال مصلحیان) (born on 21 March 1966 in Mashhad, Iran) is an Iranian mathematician and a professor of mathematics at Ferdowsi University of Mashhad, Iran. He is the President of the Iranian Mathematical Society for the period of 2021-2024 and an invited member of the Iranian Academy of Sciences. His Erdős number is 3. He is known for his contribution to the operator and norm inequality. He has developed the orthogonality in Hilbert C*-modules and has significant contributions to operator means. He established noncommutative versions of martingale and maximum inequalities that play an essential role in noncommutative probability spaces. In addition, he has written several expository papers discussing research and education, as well as promoting mathematics.

== Education and career ==
Moslehian obtained his Ph.D. from the Ferdowsi University of Mashhad under the supervision of Professor Assadollah Niknam in 1999. His research areas include Functional Analysis and Operator Theory, specifically operator algebras and Hilbert C^{*}-modules. He spent his sabbatical leave at the University of Leeds (UK) and Karlstad University (Sweden) in 2006 and 2015 respectively and was a Senior Associate Researcher at the International Centre for Theoretical Physics (ICTP, Trieste) for the period of 2012-2017 and a non-resident researcher of the Institute for Research in Fundamental Sciences during 2006–2007. He supervised more than 20 PhD students.

His most significant scientific-executive responsibilities are as follows:

- The President of the Iranian Mathematical Society (2021-2024).
- A member of the executive committee of the Iranian Mathematical Society (2004-2012) & (2021-2024).
- An invited member of the Academy of Sciences (2015-).
- Vice Dean of the Faculty of Mathematical Science at Ferdowsi University of Mashhad (2003-2004).
- Director of Center of Excellence in Analysis on Algebraic Structures (2007-).
- General Director of Graduate Studies at Ferdowsi University of Mashhad (2008-2012).
- Vice-Dean (Research Affairs) of the Faculty of Mathematical Science at Ferdowsi University of Mashhad (2016-2018).
- General Director of Research at the Ferdowsi University of Mashhad (2018-).
- The founder and director of the "Tusi Mathematical Research Group", Iran.

== Editorial board ==
He is the founder and the editor-in-chief of three mathematics journals: Banach Journal of Mathematical Analysis, Annals of Functional Analysis, and Advances in Operator Theory that are published by Springer Nature/Birkhäuser as well as being the editor-in-chief of the Bulletin of the Iranian Mathematical Society (2010-2011) and the Newsletter of the Iranian Mathematical Society (2004-2007).

== Awards and honors ==
Some of Moslehian's most important awards/honors for his contributions to mathematics include:

- A gold medal (third place) at the Annual Iranian Student Competition in Mathematics (مسابفه ریاضی دانشجویی کشوری) organized by the Iranian Mathematical Society (1989).
- A gold medal and award from Ferdowsi Academic Foundation (بنیاد دانشگاهی فردوسی) as the distinguished academic member in Basic Sciences (2011).
- The Razavi Scientific award (نشان علمی رضوی) as an elected researcher in Basic Sciences by the governor-general of Razavi Khorasan Province (2016).
- An award as a distinguished researcher elected by Ministry of Science, Research and Technology and a certificate from the first vice president of Iran (2018).
- Recipient of the national Allame Tabatabaei Award (جايزه علامه طباطبايى) and certificate from a vice president of Iran (2019).

== Books ==
- General Topology (with A. Niknam), Ferdowsi Univ. Press, Mashad, 2005. (in Persian)

== Selected journal articles ==
- Dales, H. G.; Moslehian, Mohammad SAL (2007). "Stability of Mappings on Multi-Normed Spaces". Glasgow Mathematical Journal. 49 (2): 321–332. doi:10.1017/S0017089507003552. S2CID 3257834.
- Mirzavaziri, Madjid; Moslehian, Mohammad Sal (2006). "Automatic continuity of σ-derivations on C*-algebras". Proceedings of the American Mathematical Society. 134 (11): 3319–3327. arXiv:math/0508028. doi:10.1090/S0002-9939-06-08376-6. S2CID 14595610.
- Moslehian, Mohammad Sal; Najafi, Hamed (2011). "Around Operator Monotone Functions". Integral Equations and Operator Theory. 71 (4): 575–582. arXiv:1110.6594. doi:10.1007/s00020-011-1921-0. S2CID 119645053.
- Eskandari, Rasoul; Moslehian, M. S.; Popovici, Dan (2021). "Operator equalities and Characterizations of Orthogonality in Pre-Hilbert C*-Modules". Proceedings of the Edinburgh Mathematical Society. 64 (3): 594–614. arXiv:2001.10053. doi:10.1017/S0013091521000341. S2CID 210932244.
- Matharu, Jagjit Singh; Moslehian, Mohammad Sal (2015). "Gruess inequality for some types of positive linear maps". Journal of Operator Theory. 73: 265–278. arXiv:1411.0134. doi:10.7900/jot.2013nov20.2040. S2CID 119714354.
