= Annals of Functional Analysis =

- Discipline: Functional analysis, operator theory
- Language: English
- Edited by: Mohammad Sal Moslehian

Publication details
- History: 2010–present
- Publisher: Tusi Mathematical Research Group
- Frequency: Quarterly

Standard abbreviations
- ISO 4: Ann. Funct. Anal.

Indexing
- ISSN: 2639-7390 (print); 2008-8752 (web)
- OCLC no.: 652359887

Links
- Journal homepage; Online access

The Annals of Functional Analysis is a peer-reviewed mathematics journal founded by Professor Mohammad Sal Moslehian and published by the Tusi Mathematical Research Group in cooperation with Springer (Birkhäuser). The journal was established in 2009 and covers functional analysis and operator theory and related topics.

== Abstracting and indexing ==
The journal is abstracted and indexed in Scopus, Science Citation Index Expanded, Mathematical Reviews, and Zentralblatt MATH. The journal is included in the Reference List Journal of MathSciNet published by the American Mathematical Society. Two other related journals are Banach Journal of Mathematical Analysis and Advances in Operator Theory.
