= CandyFab =

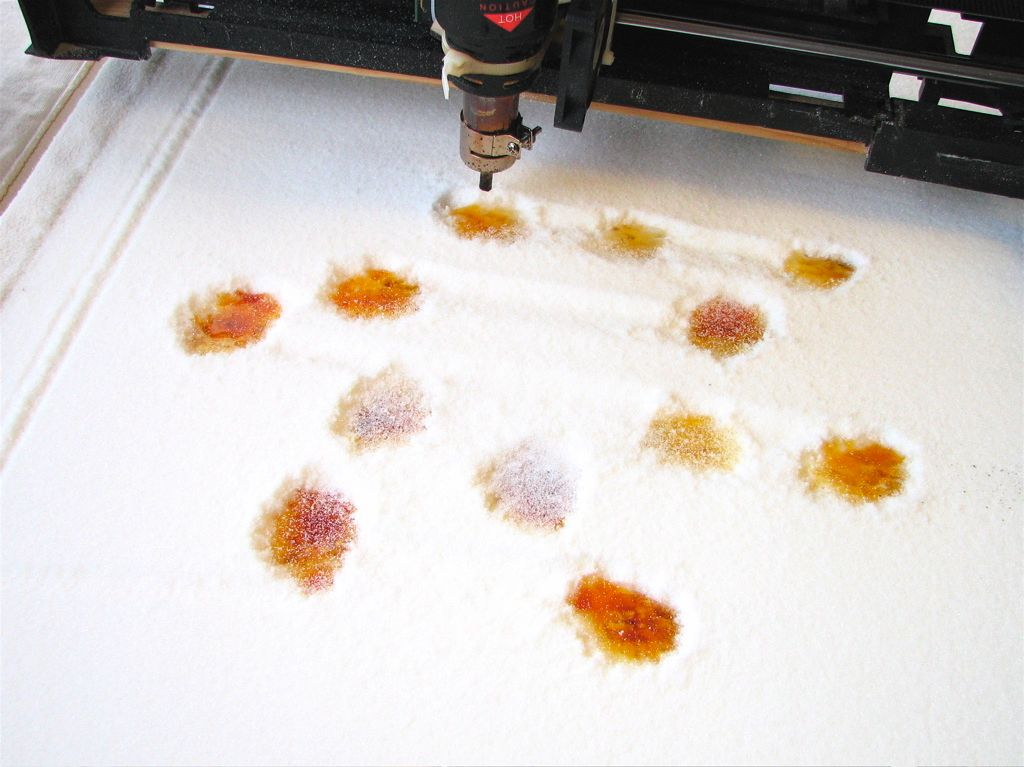
Midpoint in printing a toroidal coil sculpture on the CandyFab 4000, an experimental rapid prototyping machine that can use granulated sugar as the printing medium.

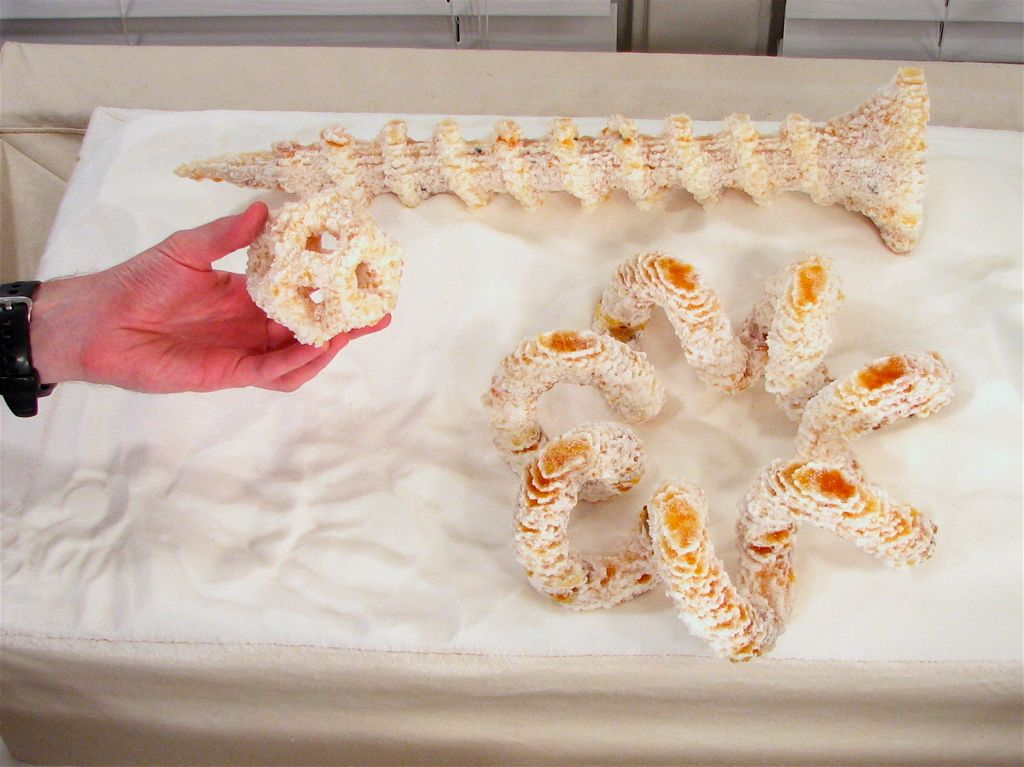
Completed toroidal coil sculpture, along with a model of a wood screw and a small dodecahedron. Each of these objects was fabricated out of pure sugar.

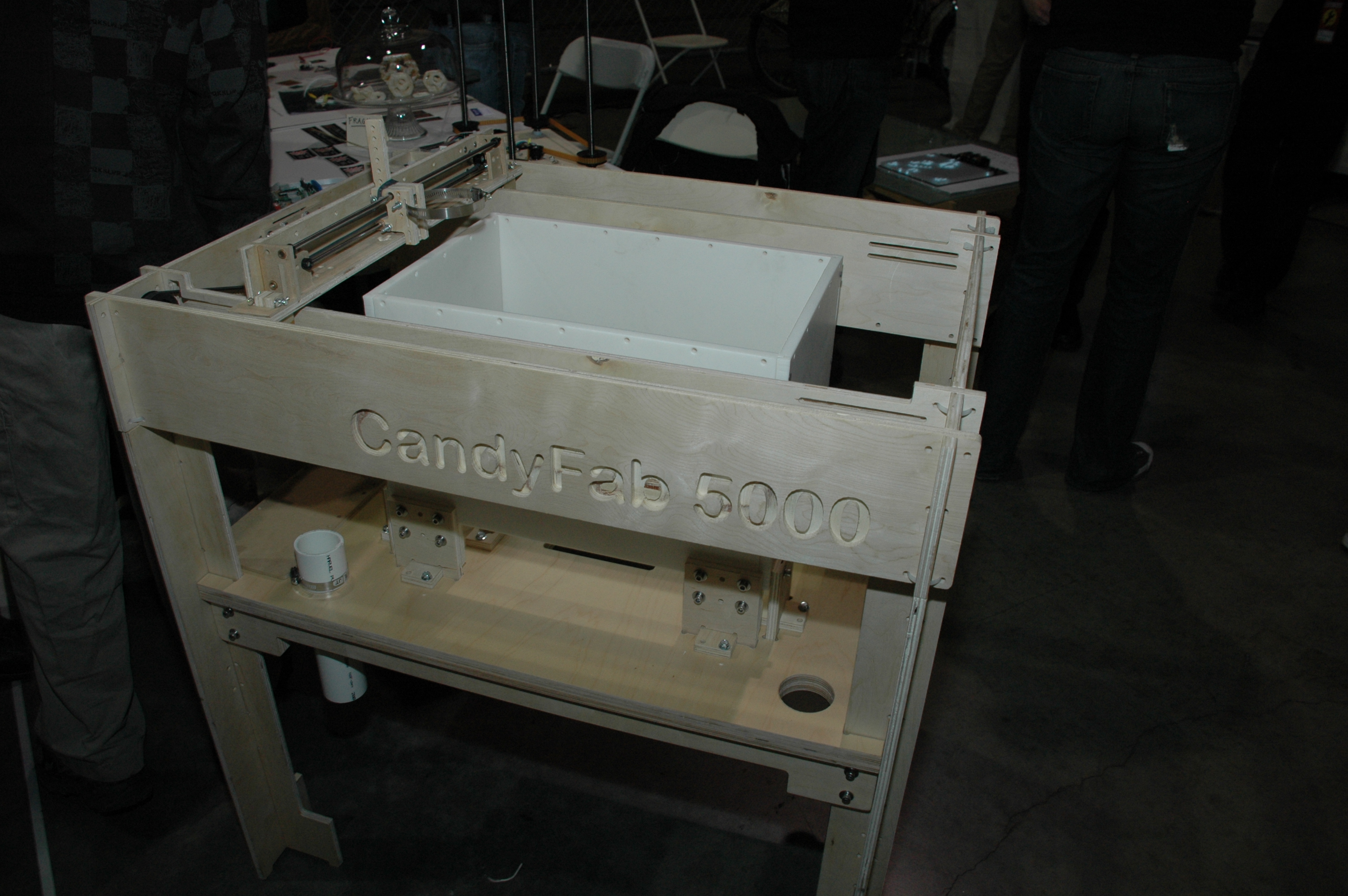
CandyFab 5000 machine at the 2008 Maker Faire event

The CandyFab is a method of producing physical objects out of a computer representation of the structure. It differs from some other 3D printing methods in the following aspects:

- It is optimized for relatively large pieces using low to medium print resolution.
- To reduce the hazards of working with large amounts of media, non-toxic materials (ideally, food-grade) are used. The prototype CandyFab 4000 unit uses granulated sugar as its print medium, giving rise to its name, but other materials with low melting temperatures and low toxicities are still under consideration.
- It uses low cost parts and construction to make it easier for others to design or build their own, with plans available as open source.

== Technology ==
The CandyFab uses a heat source mounted on a computer-controlled X-Y positioning head to fuse the surface of a granular bed of the print media. The only thing which comes into contact with the media is heated air, which is turned on and off by the software synchronously with the motion of the positioning head. Fabrication of the shape of the part being produced progresses in layers; after each complete pass, the bed is lowered and a fresh layer of granular media is applied on top. The unfused media serves to support overhangs and thin walls in the part being produced, reducing the need for auxiliary temporary supports for the workpiece. The movable bed is of a size suitable for producing finished parts several kilograms in weight.

The resolution of features produced correspond to a smallest volume element of 2.5 x 2.5 x 2.7 mm or less. Pieces produced from ordinary granular sugar have fairly good strength and feature an amber to brown surface color owing to caramelization of the sugar. Special attention has been paid to the selection of all materials coming into contact with the sugar bed or with the hot air stream to make it possible to fabricate food-grade pieces if desired.

There is an effort to encourage further work on improving the technology in the following areas:

- Hardware
- 3D modeling software
- CNC software

In addition, the inventors Windell Oskay and Lenore Edman of candyfab.org have organized teams to explore applications, gastronomy, and post processing.

== Fabricated pieces ==
Several large pieces of sculpture have been produced using the CandyFab, including one of a mathematical object designed by sculptor Bathsheba Grossman. This and other pieces were shown by inventors Windell Oskay and Lenore Edman of candyfab.org at the Bay Area Maker Faire 2007.

== See also ==
- Rapid prototyping
- Solid freeform fabrication
- Digital fabricator
