= You (Grossman novel) =

2013 novel by Austin Grossman

You: A Novel
- Author: Austin Grossman
- Language: English
- Genre: Fiction
- Published: 2013, Mulholland Books
- Publication place: United States
- Media type: Print, e-book, audiobook
- Pages: 400 pages (hardcover)
- ISBN: 0316198536

You: A Novel (also stylized as YOU in all capital letters) is a 2013 techno-thriller novel by author Austin Grossman. It was released on April 16, 2013, through Mulholland Books and centers on a game developer that takes a job at a company created by two formerly close friends, only to end up putting his own life in jeopardy in the process.

While writing the book, Grossman drew upon his experiences in the game development world and used the movie Tron as an influence, as it had influenced him early on in his career.

== Synopsis ==
Average guy Russell is offered the chance to work at the prestigious Black Arts games as a video game designer, a company created by two formerly close friends of his. He soon finds that one of his other friends, Simon, also worked at the company but died under mysterious circumstances that might be related to the company's first big hit. Russell manages to initially flourish at the company but finds his job in danger after a software glitch could potentially permanently derail the company's next big game release. As Russell tries to find and fix the root of the glitch, he discovers that doing so is putting his own life at risk, as the glitch has far deeper implications than he initially realized.

== Reception ==
Critical reception has been mixed to positive. Common praise for You has centered on the book's premise and delivery, as well as its detail about the programming world. SF Signal gave a mostly negative review for the work, stating that while the book had some decent material, ultimately there was "too much nostalgia and not enough substance". Tor.com remarked that they had misgivings about the book that were justified, but that ultimately they loved the work as a whole and that the things that made them enjoy the book would be things that would make others dislike it.
