= Austin Grossman =

American author and video game designer (born 1969)

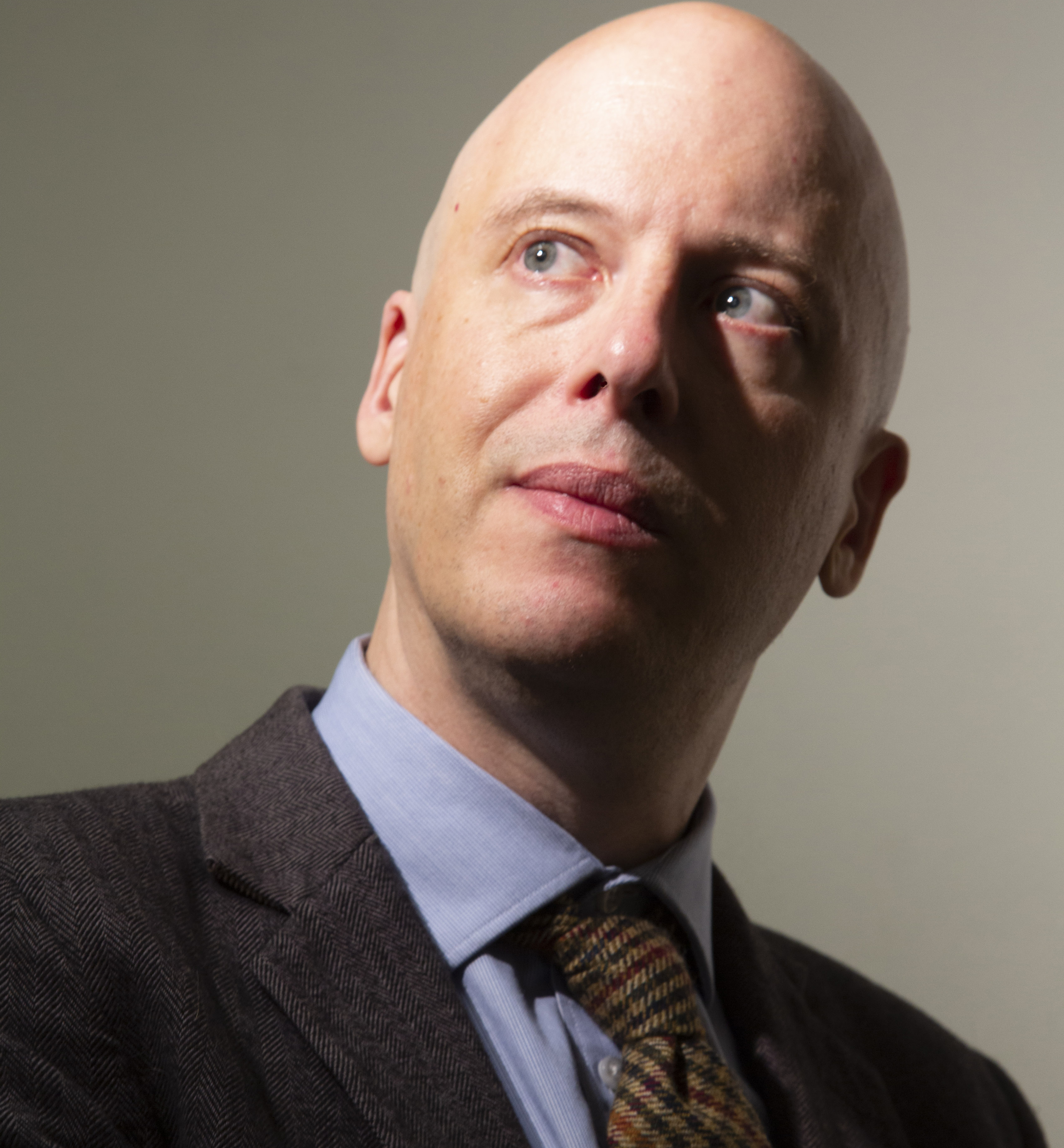
- Grossman in 2019
- Born: June 26, 1969 (age 57); Concord, Massachusetts, U.S.
- Education: Harvard University (BA)
- Relatives: Lev Grossman (twin brother); Bathsheba Grossman (sister); Allen Grossman (father); Judith Grossman (mother)

Austin Seth Grossman (born June 26, 1969) is an American author and video game designer. He has contributed to The New York Times and has written for a number of video games, most notably Deus Ex and Dishonored.

== Life ==
Grossman was born in Concord, Massachusetts. He graduated from Harvard University in 1991 and pursued a graduate degree in English literature at the University of California, Berkeley. He is the twin brother of writer Lev Grossman and brother of sculptor Bathsheba Grossman, and the son of the poet Allen Grossman and the novelist Judith Grossman.

Grossman's father was born Jewish and his mother was raised Anglican.

Grossman started his career in the game industry by replying to a classified ad in The Boston Globe in May 1992 that led him to Looking Glass Studios, where in System Shock he pioneered the audio log technique for storytelling in narrative games. Grossman has worked with DreamWorks Interactive, Ion Storm, and Crystal Dynamics, and served as Director of Game Design and Interactive Story at Magic Leap until April 2020. He currently teaches writing and narrative design at New York University Tisch School of the Arts.

== Novels ==
Grossman is the author of the novel Soon I Will Be Invincible, which was published by Pantheon Books in 2007. His second book, entitled YOU, debuted in April 2013. His third novel, Crooked, came out in July 2015. In 2021, he co-wrote an original audiobook for Audible called New Found Land: The Long Haul with Neal Stephenson and Sean Stewart, which the trio had developed as a story for AR company Magic Leap. In June 2024, Grossman published his fourth novel, Fight Me.

== Works ==
=== Books ===
- Soon I Will Be Invincible (2007)
- You (2013)
- Crooked (2015)
- Fight Me (2024)

=== Audio Original ===
- New Found Land: The Long Haul (2021), co-written with Neal Stephenson and Sean Stewart.

=== Short stories ===
- "The River Gods of Mars" in Under the Moons of Mars: New Adventures on Barsoom (2012)
- "Professor Incognito Apologizes: an Itemized List" in The Mad Scientist's Guide to World Domination (2013)
- "The Fresh Prince of Gamma World" in Press Start to Play (2015)

=== Games ===
Year	Title	Developer
1993	Ultima Underworld II: Labyrinth of Worlds	LookingGlass Technologies
1994	System Shock	LookingGlass Technologies
1995	Flight Unlimited	LookingGlass Technologies
1996	Terra Nova: Strike Force Centauri	LookingGlass Technologies
1998	Trespasser	DreamWorks Interactive
2000	Deus Ex	Ion Storm
2001	Clive Barker's Undying	EA Los Angeles
2001	Battle Realms	Liquid Entertainment
2004	Thief: Deadly Shadows	Ion Storm
2006	Tomb Raider: Legend	Crystal Dynamics
2008	Frontlines: Fuel of War	Kaos Studios; N-Fusion Interactive
2012	Dishonored	Arkane Studios
2016	Dishonored 2	Arkane Studios
