= Crooked (novel) =

2015 novel by Austin Grossman

- First edition cover
- Author: Austin Grossman
- Publisher: Mulholland Books
- Publication date: July 28, 2015
- ISBN: 978-0-316-19851-6

Crooked is a novel by author Austin Grossman, published in 2015 by Mulholland Books. It is a cosmic horror fantasy and secret history of the Cold War and the Watergate scandal, narrated by a fictional version of Richard Nixon.

== Synopsis ==
Richard Nixon grows up on his parents’ citrus farm, occasionally perceiving eerie forces and noticing strange behavior by his mother. When he grows up he returns from service in World War II and wins office against incumbent U. S. Representative Jerry Voorhis. Once in Washington Nixon works with the House Un-American Activities Committee investigating Whittaker Chambers’ accusations against U.S. State Department official Alger Hiss. While tailing Hiss, Nixon is apprehended by KGB operatives Arkady and Gregor. Through a misapplied spell, Gregor becomes possessed by a powerful supernatural entity. Both Arkady and Nixon shoot Gregor, but only wound him.

Through subsequent study of Hiss’s papers, Nixon learns of a government project called Blue Ox, being run out of isolated Pawtuxet Farm in rural Massachusetts. The sponsor of Project Blue Ox, General Dwight Eisenhower, chooses Nixon as his running mate when he runs for President of the United States. Nixon witnesses Eisenhower cast a fatal curse on Josef Stalin (which directly leads to his death), but Eisenhower is reluctant to pass on all the mystical secrets of the Oval Office to Nixon, and many are forgotten after Eisenhower’s 1957 stroke.

Nixon withdraws from politics after losing the 1960 presidential election to John F. Kennedy and failing in his 1962 bid for Governor of California, but he is drafted to run again for president by Henry Kissinger, in reality a millennia-old wizard. Once in office, Nixon finds himself and his country once again targeted by Gregor, who Kissinger tells him has made a deal with challenger George McGovern. It is in response to this action that the 1972 Watergate break-in is planned.

== Background and composition ==
Grossman has said that he chose Nixon as the protagonist of his novel because Nixon was President when he was born, and also because he had always been regarded as a villain and a joke. When the novel was being written Grossman’s brother Lev read an outline.

== Critical reception ==
Washington Post critic Ron Charles gave the book a mixed-to-positive review, saying, "Only when it comes to Henry Kissinger does the novel really live up to its comic potential...The scene of Kissinger — Doctor Kissinger, please! — showing the president his lair under the Pentagon is a delightful tip of the sorcerer’s hat to Dr. Strangelove.”

Novelist Elizabeth Hand offered qualified praise in her review for the Los Angeles Times, writing, "The most impressive aspect of the novel is how Grossman creates a nuanced, funny and moving characterization of a man reviled during (and after) his term of office," although she was more critical of the book's pacing.

io9's Annalee Newitz praised Crooked alongside Linda Nagata's The Red, saying, "There’s a lot of sardonic humor in the retelling of Nixon’s career as a supernatural thriller, leading up to the ghoulish apocalypse of Watergate, [b]ut there’s also genuine insight into what motivates politicians, and how a lifetime spent clawing to get to the White House will drive people mad as surely as Cthulhu does." io9 subsequently included Crooked on its list of the best science fiction and fantasy novels of 2015.
