= Allen Grossman =

American writer (1932–2014)

- Born: January 7, 1932; Minneapolis, Minnesota, US
- Died: June 27, 2014 (aged 82); Chelsea, Massachusetts, US
- Education: Harvard (BA, MA), Brandeis University (PhD)
- Occupations: Poet; critic; professor
- Spouse: Judith Grossman
- Children: 5
- Writing career
- Period: 1959–2009
- Genres: Poetry, essay
- Notable awards: Bollingen Prize (2009)
- Website: www.allengrossman.com

Allen R. Grossman (January 7, 1932 – June 27, 2014) was a noted American poet, critic and professor.

== Biography ==
Born in Minneapolis, Minnesota in 1932, Grossman was educated at Harvard University, graduating with an MA in 1956 after several interruptions. He went on to receive a PhD from Brandeis University in 1960, where he remained a professor until 1991. In 1991, he became the Andrew W. Mellon Professor in the Humanities at Johns Hopkins University where until 2005 he taught in the English Department, primarily focusing on poetry and poetics. He continued to write after his retirement from teaching.

Grossman was raised Jewish.

Grossman's first marriage ended in divorce; afterwards he married novelist Judith Grossman, and they stayed married until his death. His children are Jonathan Grossman and Adam Grossman from the first marriage, and Bathsheba Grossman, Austin Grossman, and Lev Grossman from the second.

On November 11, 2006, on the occasion of his retirement, several friends, colleagues, and students of Grossman held a joint reading in his honor. These included Michael Fried, Susan Howe, Ha Jin, Mark Halliday, Breyten Breytenbach, Susan Stewart and Frank Bidart. The event culminated with a reading by Grossman of poetry from his latest book of poems, Descartes' Loneliness.

Grossman died of complications from Alzheimer's at a nursing home in Chelsea, Mass. on June 27, 2014. He was 82.

== Publications ==
=== Poetry ===
- Wash Day, Descartes' Loneliness, Allen Grossman, Poetry Daily
- City of David, Descartes' Loneliness, Allen Grossman, Cahiers de Corey
- Dust, Allen Grossman, AGNI Online

=== Books ===
- A Harlot's Hire (Cambridge, Massachusetts: Boars Head Press, 1959).
- The Recluse (Cambridge, Massachusetts: Pym-Randall Press, 1965).
- And The Dew Lay All Night Upon My Branch (Lexington, Mass.: Aleph Press, 1974).
- The Woman on the Bridge over the Chicago River (New York: New Directions, 1979).
- Of The Great House (New York: New Directions, 1982)
- The Bright Nails Scattered on the Ground (New York: New Directions, 1986).
- The Ether Dome and Other Poems New and Selected, (1979–1990) (New York: New Directions, Fall 1991). Selected by critic Harold Bloom for inclusion in his Western Canon.
- The Song of the Lord (Watershed, 1991). An audiotape where the author reads poems selected from The Ether Dome.
- The Philosopher's Window and Other Poems (New York: New Directions, 1995).
- How to Do Things with Tears (New York: New Directions, 2001).
- Sweet Youth (New York: New Directions, 2002).
- Descartes' Loneliness (New York: New Directions, 2007).
- True-Love: Essays on Poetry and Valuing (Chicago and London: The University of Chicago Press, 2009).

=== Selected prose ===
- Poetic Knowledge in the Early Yeats: a study of The Wind Among the Reeds (University of Virginia Press, 1969).
- The Sighted Singer: Two Works on Poetry (Johns Hopkins University Press, 1992). Contains (Part II): "Summa Lyrica: A Primer of the Common Places in Speculative Poetics".
- The Long Schoolroom: Lessons in the Bitter Logic of the Poetic Principle (University of Michigan Press, 1997).
- "The Passion of Laocoon: Warfare of the Religious Against the Poetic Institution" in Western Humanities Review, Vol LVI Number 2 Fall 2002, pp. 30–80.
- "Wordsworth's 'The Solitary Reaper': Notes on Poiesis, Pastoral, and Institution", TriQuarterly 116, Summer 2003.

== Prizes and awards ==
- Garrison Award for Poetry (195?)
- Prize of the American Academy of Poetry (195?)
- A. B. Cohen Award for Teaching (1965)
- The Pushcart Prize (1975, 1987, 1990)
- Brandeis University Distinguished Service Award (1982)
- Guggenheim Fellowship (1982)
- National Endowment for the Arts Fellowship (1985)
- CASE Massachusetts State Professor of the Year (1987)
- Sara Teasdale Memorial Prize in Poetry (1987)
- Sheaffer-PEN/New England Award for Literary Distinction (1988)
- MacArthur Fellowship (1989)
- National Book Critics Circle Award nominee (1992)
- American Academy of Arts and Sciences Fellow (1993)
- Bollingen Prize (2009)

== Legacy ==
Ben Lerner discusses Grossman's impact on poetics at length in The Hatred of Poetry and references Grossman's death, ostensibly contemporaneously, on p. 78.

== Criticism ==
- Daniel Morris, ed. (2004). Poetry's Poet: Essays on the Poetry, Pedagogy, and Poetics of Allen Grossman. National Poetry Foundation. ISBN 978-0-943373-66-9.
