= Judith Grossman =

American writer

- Education: Somerville College, Oxford; Brandeis University (PhD)
- Occupation: Writer
- Spouse: Allen Grossman (died 2014)
- Children: Lev; Austin; Bathsheba

Judith Grossman is an American writer. She earned a scholarship to Somerville College, Oxford, from which she received a First Class degree in English in 1958. She received a Ph.D. from Brandeis University, in 1968. She has taught at Bennington College. She also taught in the Creative Writing MFA programs at University of California, Irvine from 1992 to 1995 and the University of Iowa (1997). She was chairman of the liberal arts division at Mount Ida College in Newton, Massachusetts.

She was raised Anglican.

She was married to the poet Allen Grossman until his death in 2014. Her children are Lev Grossman, Austin Grossman, and Bathsheba Grossman.

== Works ==
- Judith Grossman (1988). Her Own Terms. Soho Press Inc. ISBN 978-1-56947-289-7.
- Judith Grossman (August 20, 1999). How Aliens Think: Stories. Johns Hopkins University Press. ISBN 978-0-8018-6171-0. "Judith Grossman."

=== Poetry ===
- Judith Grossman. "Golden Child". poetry.com.

=== Criticism ===
- Judith Grossman (February 18, 1991). "Mother Chose the Wrong Life". The Gaddis Anthology.

== Reviews ==
Publishers Weekly (October 1999) said in Her Own Terms Grossman achieved a balance of deadpan wit and understated emotion. Grossman depicts a generation of transatlantic post-war English drifters in the early '60s.
