= Iranian Mathematical Society =

Mathematical society in Iran

- انجمن ریاضی ایران
- Abbreviation: IMS
- Formation: 1971; 55 years ago
- Type: Mathematical society
- Location: Iran
- President: Omid Ali Shehni Karamzadeh
- Website: en.ims.ir

The Iranian Mathematical Society or IMS (Persian: انجمن ریاضی ایران) is the main mathematical society in Iran. It was officially registered in 1971 by Mehdi Behzad, who was the first president. The current president of the IMS is Omid Ali Shehni Karamzadeh.

== Aims and Scope ==
The main goals of the IMS are to promote education and research in mathematical sciences to the highest level of excellence as well as foster the awareness of mathematics and its connections to other basic sciences.

== Publications ==
The primary publication of the IMS is the Bulletin of the Iranian Mathematical Society, which was first published in 1973. The other publications of the IMS are

- Journal of the Iranian Mathematical Society
- Culture and Thoughts of Mathematics
- Newsletter of the Iranian Mathematical Society

== Awards ==
The IMS awards several prizes:

- Shahshahani Prize
- Mirzakhani Award
- Riazi Kermani Award
- Behzad Award
- Radjabalipour Award
- Vesal Award
- Shafieiha Award
- Hashtroudi Award
- Fatemi Award
- Mosahab Award
- Ghorbani Award
