= Bathsheba Grossman =

American sculptor

- Born: 1966 (age 59–60)
- Education: Yale University; University of Pennsylvania
- Known for: Mathematical and scientific sculptor
- Website: bathsheba.com

Bathsheba Grossman (born 1966) is an American artist who creates sculptures using computer-aided design and three-dimensional modeling, with metal printing technology to produce sculpture in bronze and stainless steel. Her bronze sculptures are primarily mathematical in nature, often depicting mathematical oddities (for instance, a figure with only one side but three edges) or intricate patterns with unfamiliar symmetries. Her website also sells crystals that have been laser etched with three-dimensional patterns, including models of nearby stars, the DNA macromolecule, and the Milky Way Galaxy.

Grossman's works have featured in art galleries around the world, as well as The New York Times, and the television series Numb3rs and Heroes. In July 2012, her work The Rygo was installed in the VanDusen Botanical Garden in Vancouver; at 2 meters high, as of the time of installation it is the largest 3D print in North America.

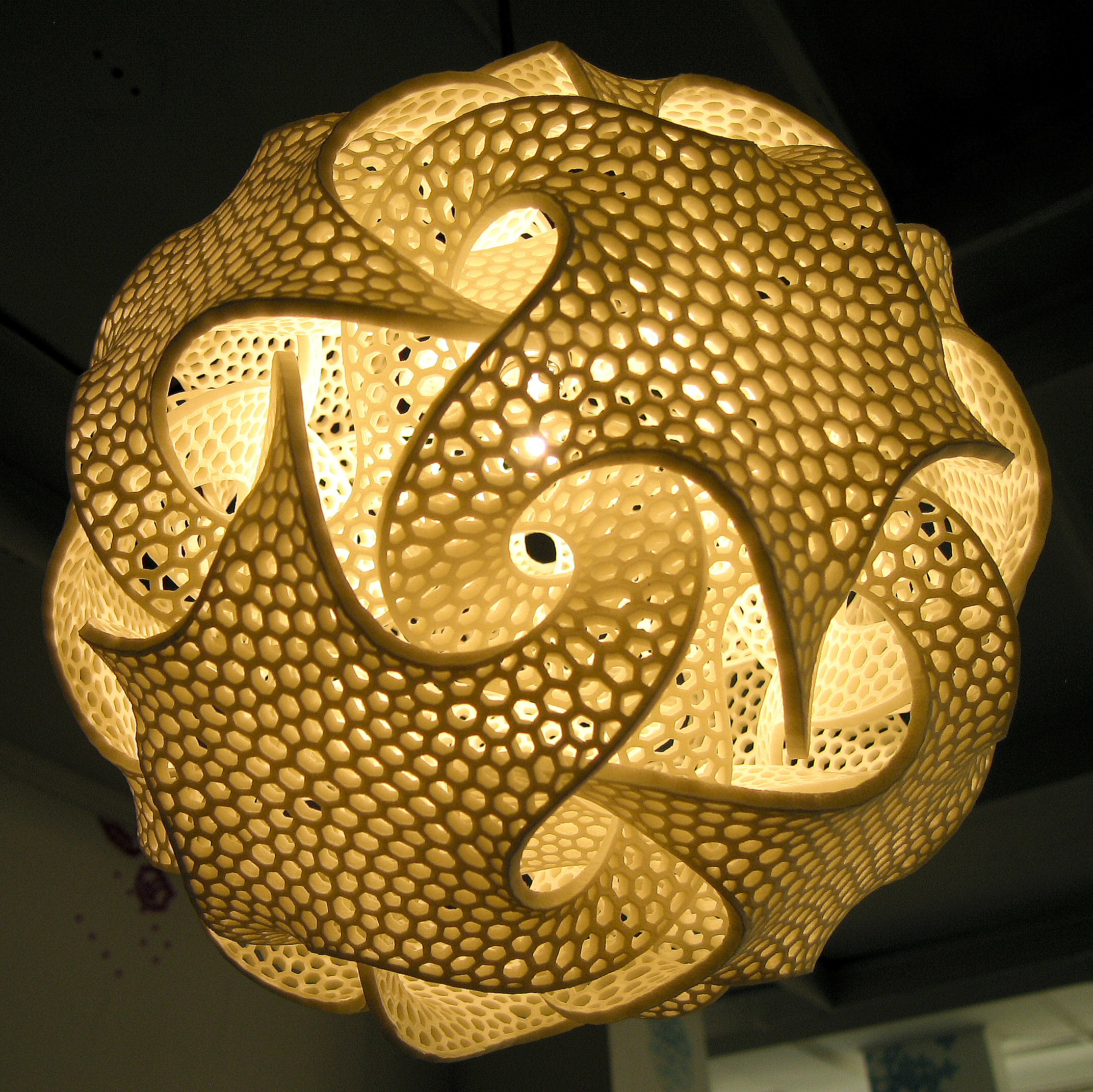
One of her rapid prototyping sculptures is used as a lamp.

She studied under sculptor Erwin Hauer at Yale University as a mathematics undergraduate, and later with Robert Engman at the University of Pennsylvania.

Her brothers are the writers Austin Grossman and Lev Grossman. She is the daughter of the poet Allen Grossman and the novelist Judith Grossman. Grossman's father was born to a Jewish family and her mother was raised Anglican.
