= Jacobus Verhoeff =

Jacobus "Koos" Verhoeff
- Born: February 20, 1927; The Hague
- Died: March 19, 2018 (aged 91); Veldhoven, Netherlands
- Education: University of Amsterdam
- Known for: Error detecting codes, Mathematical art
- Scientific career
- Fields: Mathematics, Computer science
- Workplaces: Delft University of Technology, Philips, Erasmus University Rotterdam
- Thesis: Error Detecting Decimal Codes (1969)
- Doctoral advisor: Adriaan van Wijngaarden, Wouter Peremans

Jacobus "Koos" Verhoeff (20 February 1927 – 19 March 2018) was a Dutch mathematician, computer scientist, and artist. He is known for his work on error detection and correction, and on information retrieval. He has also held exhibitions of his mathematically inspired sculptures.

He is best known for his check-digit Verhoeff algorithm, which is based on the dihedral group of order 10.

His son, Tom Verhoeff, is a mathematician and computer scientist.

== Selected publications ==
- Verhoeff, J. (1977). "A New Data Compression Technique". Annals of Systems Research. Vol. 6. Springer US. pp. 139–148. doi:10.1007/978-1-4613-4074-4_8. ISBN 978-90-207-0731-1.
- Verhoeff, Jacobus (1969). Error detecting decimal codes (Ph.D.). Mathematical Centre, Amsterdam.
- Verhoeff, J. (April 1970). "Wiskundige aspecten van het Nederlandse administratienummer voor personen (Mathematical aspects of the Dutch administration number for persons)". Informatie, Maandblad voor Informatieverwerking (in Dutch). 12 (4): 162–169.
- Verhoeff, Jacobus; Goffman, W; Belzer, Jack (1961). "Inefficiency of the use of boolean functions for information retrieval systems". Communications of the ACM. 4 (12). Association for Computing Machinery: 557–558. doi:10.1145/366853.366861. S2CID 10188422.
- Verhoeff, J. (1953). "Recent investigations about the radical of a ring". Rapport ZW. 1953–007. Math. Centrum Amsterdam.
- Verhoeff, J. "On pseudo-convergent sequences". Nederl. Akad. Wetensch. Proc. Ser. A, (Indagationes Math.). 15 (401–404).
