= Birkhäuser =

Swiss publisher

- Parent company: Springer Science+Business Media (science); Walter de Gruyter (design)
- Founded: 1879
- Founder: Emil Birkhäuser
- Defunct: 2012
- Country of origin: Switzerland
- Headquarters location: Basel
- Publication types: books, academic journals
- Official website: www.springer.com/gp/birkhaeuser (Springer) www.degruyter.com (de Gruyter)

Birkhäuser was a Swiss publisher founded in 1879 by Emil Birkhäuser. It was acquired by Springer Science+Business Media in 1985. Today it is an imprint used by two companies in unrelated fields:

- Springer continues to publish science (particularly: history of science, geosciences, computer science) and mathematics books and journals under the Birkhäuser imprint (with a leaf logo) sometimes called Birkhäuser Science.
- Birkhäuser Verlag – an architecture and design publishing company was (re)created in 2010 when Springer sold its design and architecture segment to ACTAR. The resulting Spanish-Swiss company was then called ActarBirkhäuser. After a bankruptcy, in 2012 Birkhäuser Verlag was sold again, this time to De Gruyter.

Additionally, the Reinach-based printer Birkhäuser+GBC operates independently of the above, being now owned by Basler Zeitung.

== History ==
The original Swiss publishers program focused on regional literature. In the 1920s the sons of Emil Birkhäuser established a basis for the current scientific program with academic journals and reference books, later progressing to textbooks and monographs in the natural sciences. (The company was formally known as "Verlag Emil Birkhäuser & Cie. A.G." back then.) In the 1940s the scientific segments were expanded and gained international recognition. Publications in civil engineering followed as did further journals and book series in the ensuing years. In the 1960s the publishing program was expanded to incorporate architecture and art of famous painters, lithographs and gravures. Birkhäuser opened a branch office in Boston, Massachusetts, USA in 1979 which focused on mathematics and theoretical physics. From 1985 to 2010 Birkhäuser entirely was a part of the Springer Group.
