= Mathematics and fiber arts =

Ideas from Mathematics have been used as inspiration for fiber arts

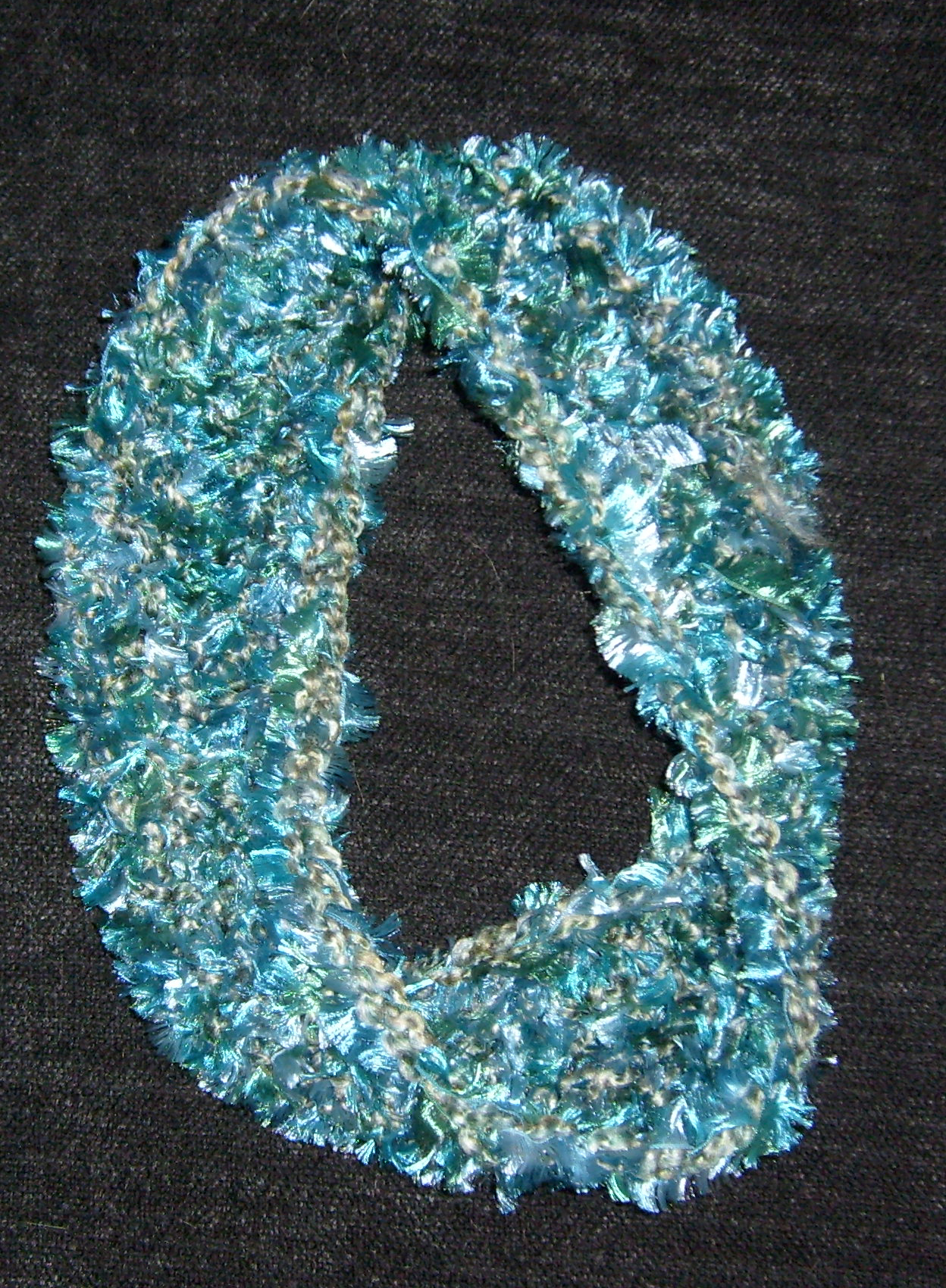
A Möbius strip scarf made from crochet.

Ideas from mathematics have been used as inspiration for fiber arts including quilt making, knitting, cross-stitch, crochet, embroidery and weaving. A wide range of mathematical concepts have been used as inspiration including topology, graph theory, number theory and algebra. Some techniques such as counted-thread embroidery are naturally geometrical; other kinds of textile provide a ready means for the colorful physical expression of mathematical concepts.

== Quilting ==
The IEEE Spectrum has organized a number of competitions on quilt block design, and several books have been published on the subject. Notable quiltmakers include Diana Venters and Elaine Ellison, who have written a book on the subject Mathematical Quilts: No Sewing Required. Examples of mathematical ideas used in the book as the basis of a quilt include the golden rectangle, conic sections, Leonardo da Vinci's Claw, the Koch curve, the Clifford torus, San Gaku, Mascheroni's cardioid, Pythagorean triples, spidrons, and the six trigonometric functions.

== Knitting and crochet ==
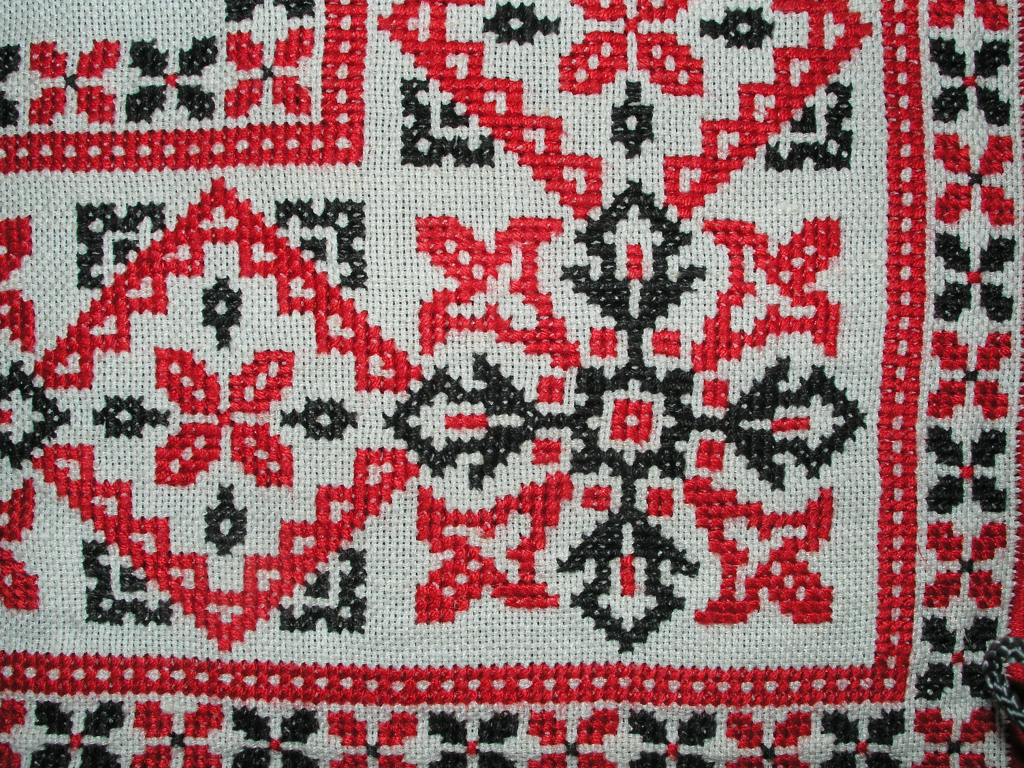
Cross-stitch counted-thread embroidery

Knitted mathematical objects include the Platonic solids, Klein bottles and Boy's surface. The Lorenz manifold and the hyperbolic plane have been crafted using crochet. Knitted and crocheted tori have also been constructed depicting toroidal embeddings of the complete graph K_{7} and of the Heawood graph. The crocheting of hyperbolic planes has been popularized by the Institute For Figuring; a book by Daina Taimina on the subject, Crocheting Adventures with Hyperbolic Planes, won the 2009 Bookseller/Diagram Prize for Oddest Title of the Year.

Clifford Stoll is an American mathematician who produces knitted Möbius strip scarves, as well as knitted 3-Dimensional interpretations of Klein bottles.

== Embroidery ==
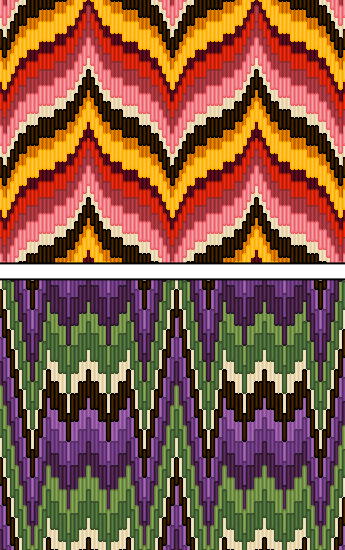
Two Bargello patterns

Embroidery techniques such as counted-thread embroidery including cross-stitch and some canvas work methods such as Bargello make use of the natural pixels of the weave, lending themselves to geometric designs.

== Weaving ==
Ada Dietz (1882 – 1981) was an American weaver best known for her 1949 monograph Algebraic Expressions in Handwoven Textiles, which defines weaving patterns based on the expansion of multivariate polynomials.

J. C. P. Miller (1970) used the Rule 90 cellular automaton to design tapestries depicting both trees and abstract patterns of triangles.

== Spinning ==
Margaret Greig was a mathematician who articulated the mathematics of worsted spinning.

== Fashion design ==
The silk scarves from DMCK Designs' 2013 collection are all based on Douglas McKenna's space-filling curve patterns. The designs are either generalized Peano curves, or based on a new space-filling construction technique.

The Issey Miyake Fall-Winter 2010–2011 ready-to-wear collection designs from a collaboration between fashion designer Dai Fujiwara and mathematician William Thurston. The designs were inspired by Thurston's geometrization conjecture, the statement that every 3-manifold can be decomposed into pieces with one of eight different uniform geometries, a proof of which had been sketched in 2003 by Grigori Perelman as part of his proof of the Poincaré conjecture.

== See also ==
- Mathematics and art
