= Fringe theory =

Idea which departs from accepted scholarship in the field

A fringe theory is an idea or a viewpoint that differs significantly from the accepted scholarship of the time within its field. Fringe theories include the models and proposals of fringe science, as well as similar ideas in other areas of scholarship, such as the humanities. In a narrower sense, the term fringe theory is commonly used as a pejorative, roughly synonymous with the terms pseudo-scholarship and conspiracy theory. Precise definitions distinguishing widely held viewpoints and unaccepted theories are difficult to construct. Issues of false balance or false equivalence can occur when fringe theories are presented as being equal to widely accepted theories.

== Definitions ==
Fringe theories are ideas which depart significantly from a prevailing or mainstream theory. A fringe theory is neither a majority opinion nor that of a respected minority. In general, the term fringe theory is closer to the popular understanding of the word theory—a hypothesis or a guess or an uncertain idea—than to the concept of an established scientific theory. Although often used in the context of fringe science, fringe theories have been discussed in fields of scholarship, such as Biblical criticism, history, finance, law, medicine, and politics. They even exist in fields of study which are themselves outside the mainstream, such as cryptozoology, or parapsychology.

Fringe theories meet with varying levels of academic acceptance. Financial journalist Alexander Davidson characterized fringe theories as "peddled by a small band of staunch supporters," but not necessarily without merit. Daniel N. Robinson described them as occupying "a limbo between the decisive dead end and the ultimately credible productive theory." However, the term is also used pejoratively; advocates of fringe theories are dismissed as cranks or crackpots who are out of touch with reality. In this sense, there is some overlap with other dismissive labels, such as pseudoarchaeology, pseudohistory, and pseudoscience. Describing ideas as fringe theories may be less pejorative than describing them as pseudoscholarship; while it is unlikely that anyone would identify their own work as pseudoscience, astrologer David Cochrane is "proud to be a fringe theorist".

The term is also used to describe conspiracy theories. According to Richard Hofstadter, such theories "explain" historical or political events as the work of a powerful secret organization — "a vast, insidious, preternaturally effective international conspiratorial network". The conspirators are possessed of "almost superhuman power and cunning", as described by historian Esther Webman. Margaret Wertheim suggested that fringe theories should be treated in a manner similar to outsider art. In 2003, she curated an exhibit at the Santa Monica Museum of Art, which was dedicated to the work of pseudoscientist Jim Carter.

=== Demarcation problem ===
Wertheim wrote that a "credentialed physicist ... can generally recognize a fringe theory by sight" when it comes in the form of an eccentrically formatted manuscript; however, it is difficult to distinguish between fringe theories and respected minority theories. A workable definition of what constitutes a fringe theory may not actually be possible. This is an aspect of the demarcation problem that occurs within both science and the humanities.

Geologist Steven Dutch approached the demarcation problem by dividing scientific ideas into three categories: fringe, frontier, and center, based upon their adherence to scientific methodology and their level of acceptance. Later authors, including Richard Duschl, expanded these categories. Under Duschl's system, a fringe theory is a mix of legitimate new ideas and pseudoscience; it awaits analysis to determine whether it will pass into the "frontier" or be rejected entirely.

== Mainstream acceptance of fringe theories ==
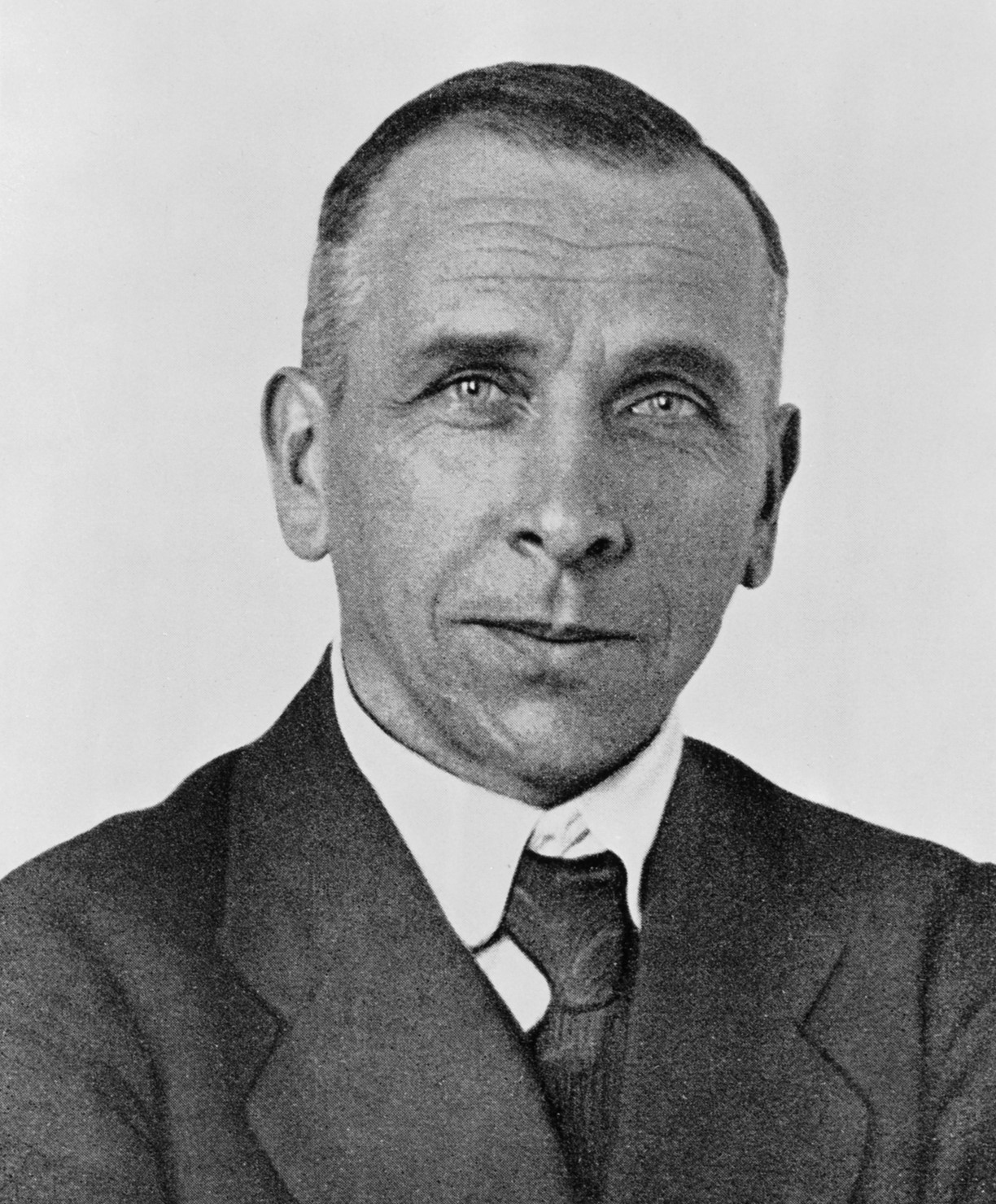
Alfred Wegener advanced the theory of continental drift, a fringe theory which was later adopted by mainstream science.

Most fringe theories never become part of established scholarship. Rejected ideas may help to refine mainstream thought, but most outside theories are simply incorrect and have no wider impact. Nevertheless, some ideas gradually receive wider acceptance until they are no longer viewed as fringe theories, and occasionally, such theories even become the mainstream view. A widely known example is Alfred Wegener's theory of continental drift, which eventually served as the basis for the accepted model of plate tectonics.

Other ideas that have made the transition include the germ theory of disease, Kristian Birkeland's explanation of the aurora, prions, and complexity theory in project management. Behavioral finance was described in 2002 as "at the fringe of ... modern financial theory", but it has since been widely applied in many fields of business. Sometimes the change is not gradual but represents a paradigm shift. Writing for the New York Law Journal, Andrew Bluestone described how a single court case in New York changed the use of an obscure common law statute regarding attorney misconduct from a "fringe theory of law" to an accepted and mainstream cause for legal action in the state.

Conversely, former mainstream theories such as phlogiston and luminiferous aether may be superseded and relegated to the fringe. Such shifts between fringe theory and accepted theories are not always clear-cut. In 1963, Reuben Fine wrote that mainstream psychology had adopted aspects of Sigmund Freud's psychoanalysis but that many students of the discipline believed psychoanalysis to be a "lunatic fringe theory which has little to do with scientific psychology," and psychoanalysis is now generally considered discredited, according to author Frederick Crews who stated, "if you consult psychology faculties in top American universities, you will find almost no one now who believes in the Freudian system of thought. As a research paradigm it's pretty much dead."

== False balance ==
The news media may play a role in the dissemination and popularization of fringe theories. The media sometimes reduce complex topics to two sides and frame issues in terms of an underdog challenger fighting the mainstream theory. Biblical scholar Matthew Collins wrote that this simplification can be "both misrepresentative and misleading, especially when a far-fetched fringe theory is, in the name of neutrality and fairness, elevated to the role of equally legitimate contender." This false equivalence can become the expected media behavior. When The New York Times published an article strongly supporting the mainstream scientific stance on thiomersal and vaccines, others in the media condemned the Times for portraying the alleged vaccine-autism connection as a fringe theory, calling the article a "hit piece".

Issues of false balance also arise in education, especially in the context of the creation–evolution controversy. Creationism has been discredited as a fringe theory akin to Lamarckism or the cosmology of Immanuel Velikovsky's Worlds in Collision. Because advocates of creationism want schools to present only their preferred alternative, not the entire variety of minority views, they have attempted to portray scholarship on the issue as being equally divided between only two models.

== Bibliography ==
- Batt, Sharon (1996) [1994]. Patient No More: The Politics of Breast Cancer (Australian ed.). Spinifex Press. ISBN 978-1-875559-39-8.
- Bell, David (2005). Science, Technology, and Culture. Issues in Cultural and Media Studies. Open University Press. ISBN 978-0-335-21326-9.
- Curlee, Wanda; Gordon, Robert Lee (2013). Successful Program Management: Complexity Theory, Communication, and Leadership. Best Practices and Advances in Program Management Series. Auerbach. ISBN 978-1-4665-6879-2.
- Davidson, Alexander (2002). How to Win in a Volatile Stock Market: The Definitive Guide to Investment Bargain Hunting (2nd ed.). Kogan Page. ISBN 978-0-7494-3803-6.
- Erduran, Sibel; Dagher, Zoubeida (2013). Reconceptualizing the Nature of Science for Science Education: Scientific Knowledge, Practices and Other Family Categories. Contemporary Trends and Issues in Science Education. Springer. ISBN 978-94-017-9056-7.
- Fine, Reuben (2013) [1963]. Freud: A Critical Re-evaluation of his Theories (Reprint ed.). Routledge. ISBN 978-0-415-71708-3.
- Fritze, Ronald H. (2009). Invented Knowledge: False History, Fake Science and Pseudo-religions. Reaktion Books. ISBN 978-1-86189-430-4.
- Hansson, Sven Ove (2013). "Defining Pseudoscience and Science". In Pigliucci, Massimo; Boudry, Maarten (eds.). Philosophy of Pseudoscience: Reconsidering the Demarcation Problem. University of Chicago Press. pp. 61–78. ISBN 978-0-226-05196-3.
- Jago, Lucy (2002) [2001]. The Northern Lights (Reprint ed.). Vintage. ISBN 978-0-375-70882-4.
- Offit, Paul A. (2010). Autism's False Prophets: Bad Science, Risky Medicine, and the Search for a Cure. Columbia University Press. ISBN 978-0-231-14637-1.
- Quinn, Paul (2012). "Anti-Catholicism, Islamophobia, and Modern Christian Multi-Media". In Ansari, Humayun; Hafez, Farid (eds.). From the Far Right to the Mainstream: Islamophobia in Party Politics and the Media. Campus Verlag. pp. 130–153. ISBN 978-3-593-39648-4.
- Rundlett, Ellsworth T. III (2013) [1991]. Maximizing Damages in Small Personal Injury Cases (Revision ed.). James Publishing. ISBN 978-0-938065-55-5.
- Shermer, Michael (2013). "Science and Pseudoscience". In Pigliucci, Massimo; Boudry, Maarten (eds.). Philosophy of Pseudoscience: Reconsidering the Demarcation Problem. University of Chicago Press. pp. 203–224. ISBN 978-0-226-05196-3.
- Shiel, Lisa A. (2013). Forbidden Bigfoot: Exposing the Controversial Truth about Sasquatch, Stick Signs, UFOs, Human Origins, and the Strange Phenomena in Our Own Backyards. Jacobsville Books. ISBN 978-1-934631-29-4.
- Thurs, Daniel L.; Numbers, Ronald L. (2013). "Science, Pseudoscience, and Science Falsely So-Called". In Pigliucci, Massimo; Boudry, Maarten (eds.). Philosophy of Pseudoscience: Reconsidering the Demarcation Problem. University of Chicago Press. pp. 121–144. ISBN 978-0-226-05196-3.
- Ullmann-Margalit, Edna (2006). Out of the Cave: A Philosophical Inquiry into the Dead Sea Scrolls Research. Harvard University Press. ISBN 978-0-674-02223-2.
- Velasquez-Manoff, Moises (2013) [2012]. An Epidemic of Absence: A New Way of Understanding Allergies and Autoimmune Diseases (Reprint ed.). Scribner. ISBN 978-1-4391-9939-8.
- Webman, Esther (2011). "Introduction—hate and absurdity: the impact of The Protocols of the Elders of Zion". In Webman, Esther (ed.). The Global Impact of the Protocols of the Elders of Zion: A Century-Old Myth. Routledge Jewish Studies Series. Routledge. pp. 1–24. ISBN 978-0-415-59892-7.
- Wertheim, Margaret (2011). Physics on the Fringe: Smoke Rings, Circlons, and Alternative Theories of Everything. Walker Books. ISBN 978-0-8027-7872-7.
