= David Weintraub =

David Weintraub may refer to:

- David Weintraub (official) (1904–1969), official of the government of the United States
- David Weintraub (physicist), astrophysicist and astronomy professor
