= Jim Carter (pseudoscientist) =

Amateur scientist

James Carter is best known for his fringe theory of "circlons", the idea that everything is made up of circular objects that interact mechanically, which attempts to replace scientific theories of relativity, quantum mechanics and the Big Bang theory. His ideas are not the subject of serious scientific attention, although he has been used as a case study by writers on fringe science and has been the subject of exhibitions in Santa Monica, California and Los Angeles.

Writer Margaret Wertheim called him "the Leonardo da Vinci of fringe theorists", and wrote a book about him, Physics on the Fringe. She also produced a documentary about him called It’s Jim’s World – We Just Live In It.

== Life ==
In the 1970s, Carter worked as an abalone diver and invented Carter Lift Bags, flotation devices to bring sunken objects to the ocean's surface. He now manufactures and sells these lift bags. He has also worked as a gold miner and now owns a trailer park in Enumclaw, Washington.

== Ideas ==
According to Carter, the universe is composed of what he calls "circlons", ring-like structures like "atomic LEGO blocks, interlocking rings that snap together to form all the elements". He proposes that instead of the Big Bang theory, the universe began when two circlons combined and mated, subdividing to make up all the matter in the universe. His mechanistic theory does not involve action at a distance. He explains gravity as due to the universe's constant expansion. He derived his ideas from experiments involving smoke rings, which he sees as forming analogies for the workings of circlons. His ideas and experiments have no significant scientific standing but have been said to resemble those of 19th-century scientists Lord Kelvin and Peter Guthrie Tait.

He has written two books, The Other Theory of Physics (2000) and Gravity Does Not Exist.

== Exhibitions ==
An exhibition about Carter's ideas was held at the Santa Monica Museum of Art, in Santa Monica, California in 2002, curated by Margaret Wertheim. The exhibition included video animations, models, and diagrams. Another exhibition on his work opened at the Institute For Figuring gallery in Los Angeles in December 2011.
