= Jeannine Mosely =

American computer scientist

Jeannine Mosely (born May 16, 1953 in Pittsburgh, PA) holds a Ph.D. in EECS from the Massachusetts Institute of Technology, and is known for her work as an origami artist. She is best known for her modular origami designs, especially her work using business cards. She has organized several crowd-sourced origami projects built from tens of thousands of business cards involving hundred of volunteers for each project. She is also known for her minimalist origami designs (such as her fourfold alphabet), curved crease models, and her invention of "or-egg-ami" models made from egg cartons.

== Education and engineering career ==
Mosely earned a B.A. in mathematics and a B.S. in electrical engineering from the University of Illinois at Urbana-Champaign and a M.S. and Ph.D. in electrical engineering and computer science from the Massachusetts Institute of Technology. For her master's degree she developed algorithms for time-division multiple access (used in cell-phone technology). For her doctorate she developed flow-control algorithms for handling internet traffic. After finishing her degree, Mosely taught as a visiting lecturer for a year at the University of California, Berkeley in the EECS Department. Subsequently she worked at ICAD, Inc. from 1986 to 1999, developing geometric modeling algorithms for computer-aided design.

== Origami ==
Mosely has created several, large, crowd sourced, origami projects with business cards, as well as many smaller business card models. In 1994 she invented a method for linking traditional business card cubes together into structures that could be very large. In 1995 she launched a project to construct a level 3 approximation to the fractal called the Menger Sponge using these cubes. The project was finished in 2005 with 66,048 cards folded and assembled by Mosely and about 200 volunteers.

In 2008 she was commissioned by First Night Worcester (MA) to develop a project to be a part Worcester's New Year's Eve celebration. Worcester's Union Station was chosen as the model to be built. Mosely made a 3D computer model of the station, which was then developed into the resulting business card model. Several hundred Worcester school children assisted by student volunteers from Worcester Polytechnic Institute folded cubes and helped construct the finished model which incorporated over 60,000 cards.

In 2012, the University of Southern California Libraries commissioned Mosely to co-lead a project in conjunction with Margaret Wertheim, their resident Discovery Fellow, to engage hundreds members of the USC community in building the Mosely Snowflake Sponge, another fractal model, from approximately 49,000 business cards. The Mosely Snowflake Sponge, a member of the same family of fractals as the Menger Sponge, was discovered by Mosely in 2006 while she was exhibiting her model of that original fractal at Machine Project gallery in Los Angeles. The catalog for the Machine-Menger show was published as a small artist's book "A Field Guide to the Business Card Menger Sponge," co-written by Mosely and Wertheim, the exhibition curator. The texts and images of this book are available as an online exhibit at the Institute For Figuring.

Mosely has also developed mathematical techniques for designing and analyzing curved origami models such as her "Orb," "Bud," and "Sails." Sails is a tessellation piece created from a single sheet of white watercolor paper and made up of a repeating pattern of overlapping triangles that evokes billowing sails. In 2019-2020, "Sails" was on display at the Math Unfolded exhibition at the National Museum of Mathematics.

In 2007, Mosely began designing origami-like polyhedral models using egg cartons. She calls this technique "or-egg-ami." In 2012 one of these models was bronzed and gilded by sculptor Kevin Box with help from artist Dick Esterle. The completed sculpture, titled "Waxing Gibbous," was displayed at the Bridges Math Art Conference.

== See also ==
- Institute For Figuring
