= Judith Gamora Cohen =

American astronomer

- Born: 1946; New York City, New York
- Education: Radcliffe College, California Institute of Technology
- Known for: Being one of the designers of the Keck observatory
- Awards: Ernest F. Fullam Award of the Dudley Observatory
- Scientific career
- Fields: Astronomy
- Workplaces: University of California Berkeley, Kitt Peak National Observatory, California Institute of Technology
- Doctoral advisor: Guido Münch
- Website: https://www.pma.caltech.edu/content/judith-g-cohen and http://www.astro.caltech.edu/~jlc/

Judith Gamora Cohen (born 1946), is an American astronomer and the Kate Van Nuys Page Professor of Astronomy at the California Institute of Technology. She is a recognized expert regarding the Milky Way Galaxy, particularly with respect to the Galaxy's outer halo. She also played a key role in the design and construction of the Keck Telescope.

== Early life and education ==
Born in 1946, in New York City, New York, Cohen grew up in Brooklyn. Educated in the city's public schools, she also attended the Workmen's Circle schools in Brooklyn. The recipient of a National Merit Scholarship, she attended Radcliffe College, graduating from there in 1967 with a Bachelor of Arts degree in astronomy. In 1971, she was awarded a PhD in astronomy from the California Institute of Technology (Caltech). Her dissertation, The lithium isotope ratio in F and G field stars, was supervised by Guido Münch.

== Career and research ==
A Miller Postdoctoral Fellow at the University of California, Berkeley from 1971 to 1974, she was subsequently appointed as an assistant astronomer at the Kitt Peak National Observatory in Tucson, Arizona. Cohen joined the teaching faculty at Caltech in 1979, and was named the Kate Van Nuys Page professor of astronomy there in 2005. In addition, she serves as Caltech's co-chair of the Keck Science Steering Committee and is a member of the National Academy of Sciences. She has also delivered the Caroline Herschel Distinguished Lecture at the Space Telescope Science Institute and the Cecilia Payne-Gaposchkin Distinguished Lecture at the Center for Astrophysics, Harvard University.

Cohen's research in the structure and evolution of stars and galaxies has included developing instrumentation for the Keck observatory and leading the Caltech Faint Galaxy Redshift Survey, with more than 200 published papers.

Her research has also been described in the popular press. Using laser-guided adaptive optics at the Keck observatory, she showed that several unlikely tight clusters of stars orbiting the Andromeda Galaxy were not actually clusters at all. Together with Evan Kirby, she has studied the mass of nearby dwarf galaxy Triangulum II, showing that this galaxy has a surprisingly large mass for its number of visible stars, making it a candidate dark matter galaxy.

== See also ==
- List of women in leadership positions on astronomical instrumentation projects
