= Daina Taimiņa =

Latvian mathematician

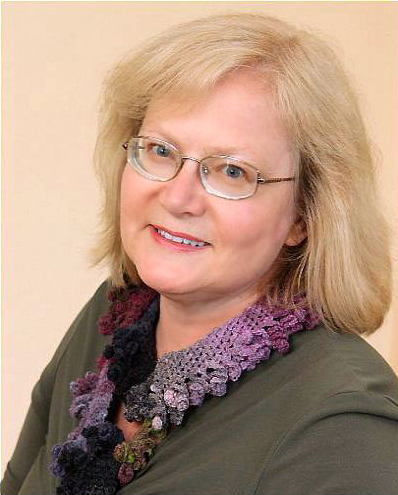
Daina Taimiņa

Daina Taimiņa (born August 19, 1954) is a Latvian mathematician, retired adjunct associate professor of mathematics at Cornell University, known for developing a way of modeling hyperbolic geometry with crocheted objects.

== Education and career ==
Taimiņa received all of her formal education in Riga, Latvia, where in 1977 she graduated summa cum laude from the University of Latvia and completed her graduate work in Theoretical Computer Science (with thesis advisor Prof. Rūsiņš Mārtiņš Freivalds) in 1990. As one of the restrictions of the Soviet system at that time, a doctoral thesis was not allowed to be defended in Latvia, so she defended hers in Minsk, receiving the title of Candidate of Sciences. This explains the fact that Taimiņa's doctorate was formally issued by the Institute of Mathematics of the National Academy of Sciences of Belarus. After Latvia regained independence in 1991, Taimiņa received her higher doctoral degree (doktor nauk) in mathematics from the University of Latvia, where she taught for 20 years.

Daina Taimiņa joined the Cornell Math Department in December 1996.

Combining her interests in mathematics and crocheting, she is one of 24 mathematicians and artists who make up the Mathemalchemy Team.

== Hyperbolic crochet ==
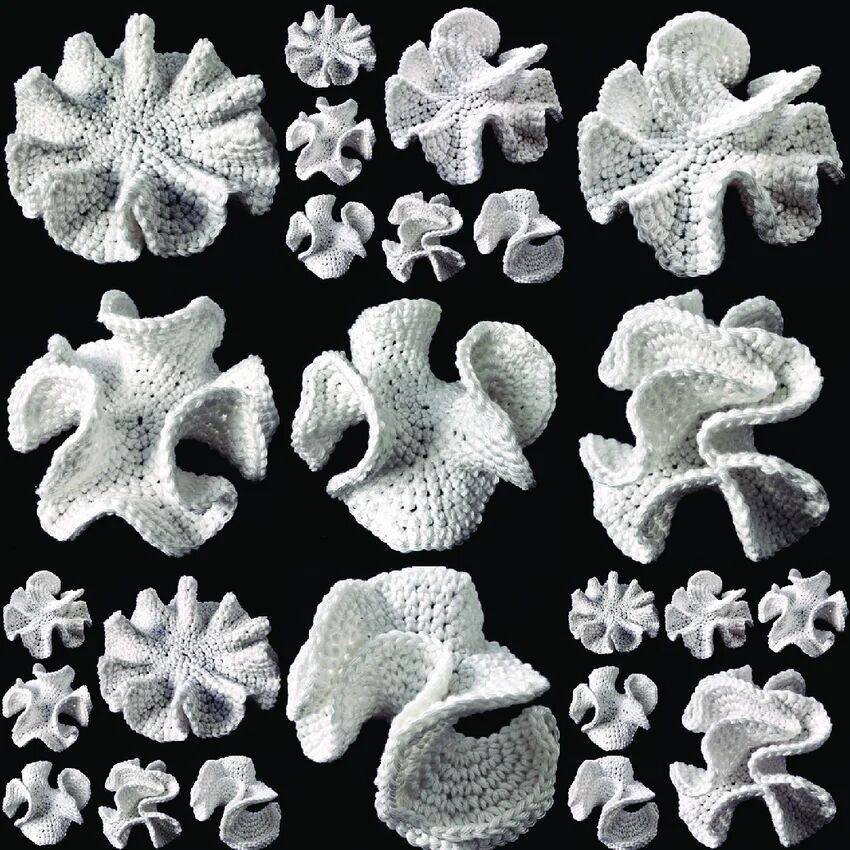
An example of a crochet model of a hyperbolic plane, photographed in different configurations of undulations, folds and oscillations compatible with the intrinsic curvature conditions.

While attending a geometry workshop at Cornell University about teaching geometry for university professors in 1997, Taimiņa was presented with a fragile paper model of a hyperbolic plane, made by the professor in charge of the workshop, David Henderson (designed by geometer William Thurston). It was made "out of thin, circular strips of paper taped together". She decided to make more durable models, and did so by crocheting them. The first night after first seeing the paper model at the workshop she began experimenting with algorithms for a crocheting pattern, after visualising hyperbolic planes as exponential growth.

The following fall, Taimiņa was scheduled to teach a geometry class at Cornell. She was determined to find what she thought was the best possible way to teach her class. So while she, together with her family, spent the preceding summer at a tree farm in Pennsylvania, she also spent her days by the pool watching her two daughters learning how to swim whilst simultaneously making a classroom set of models of the hyperbolic plane. This was the first ever made from yarn and crocheting.

The models made a significant difference to her students, according to themselves. They said they "liked the tactile way of exploring hyperbolic geometry" and that it helped them acquire experiences that helped them move on in said geometry. This was what Taimina herself had been missing when first learning about hyperbolic planes and is also what has made her models so effective, as these models have later become the preferred way of explaining hyperbolic space within geometry.

In a TedxRiga by Taimiņa she tells the story of how the need for a visual, intuitive way of understanding hyperbolic planes spurred her toward inventing crocheted geometry models. In the talk she also gives a basic introduction to hyperbolic geometry using her models as well as rendering some of the negative responses she initially received from some who viewed crocheting as unfitting in mathematics.

In the foreword to Taimiņa's book Crocheting Adventures with Hyperbolic Planes mathematician William Thurston, the designer of the paper model of hyperbolic planes, called Taimiņa's models "deceptively interesting". He attributed much of his view on them to how they make possible a tactile, non-symbolic, cognitively holistic way of understanding the highly abstract and complex part of mathematics non-euclidean geometry, is.

Taimiņa has led several workshops at Cornell University for college geometry instructors together with professor David Henderson (of the aforementioned 1997 workshop and who later became her husband). Crocheted mathematical models later appeared in three geometry textbooks they wrote together, of which the most popular is Experiencing Geometry: Euclidean and non-Euclidean with History. In 2020 Taimiņa published 4th edition of this book as open source Experiencing Geometry

An article about Taimiņa's innovation in New Scientist was spotted by the Institute For Figuring, a small non-profit organisation based in Los Angeles, and she was invited to speak about hyperbolic space and its connections with nature to a general audience which included artists and movie producers. Taimiņa's initial lecture and following other public presentations sparked great interest in this new tactile way of exploring concepts of hyperbolic geometry, making this advanced topic accessible to wide audiences. Originally creating purely mathematical models, Taimiņa soon became popular as a fiber artist and public presenter for general audiences of ages five and up. In June 2005, her work was first shown as art in an exhibition "Not The Knitting You Know" at Eleven Eleven Sculpture Space, an art gallery in Washington, D.C. Since then she has participated regularly in various shows in galleries in US, UK, Latvia, Italy, Belgium, Ireland, Germany. Her artwork is in the collections of several private collectors, colleges and universities, and has been included in the American Mathematical Model Collection of the Smithsonian Museum, Cooper–Hewitt, National Design Museum, and Institut Henri Poincaré.

Her work and its far-flung influence has received wide interest in media. It has been written about in 'Knit Theory' in Discover magazine and in The Times, explaining how a hyperbolic plane can be crocheted by increasing the number of stitches:

For example, adding an extra stitch in the second line for every five stitches in the first. And for every five stitches in the second line, adding an extra one in the third. The number of stitches increases at an exponential rate. As the lines are longer, but joined together, the material quickly starts to fold in interesting ways.

— Alex Bellos, The Times

Margaret Wertheim interviewed Daina Taimiņa and David Henderson for Cabinet Magazine Later, based on Taimiņa's work, the Institute For Figuring published a brochure "A Field Guide to Hyperbolic Space". In 2005 the IFF decided to incorporate Taimiņa's ideas and approach of explaining hyperbolic space in their mission of popularizing mathematics, and curated an exhibition at Machine Project gallery, which was the subject of a piece in the Los Angeles Times.

Taimiņa's way of exploring hyperbolic space via crochet and connections with nature, combatting math phobia, was adapted by Margaret Wertheim in her talks and became highly successful in the IFF-curated Crochet Coral Reef project.

== Books ==
Taimiņa's book Crocheting Adventures with Hyperbolic Planes (A K Peters, Ltd., 2009, ISBN 978-1-56881-452-0) won the 2009 Bookseller/Diagram Prize for Oddest Title of the Year. It also won the 2012 Euler Book Prize of the Mathematical Association of America.

Taimiņa also contributed to David W. Henderson's book Differential Geometry: A Geometric Introduction (Prentice Hall, 1998) and, with Henderson, wrote Experiencing Geometry: Euclidean and Non-Euclidean with History (Prentice Hall, 2005).

== See also ==
- Mathematics and fiber arts
