= David W. Henderson =

American mathematician (1923–2018)

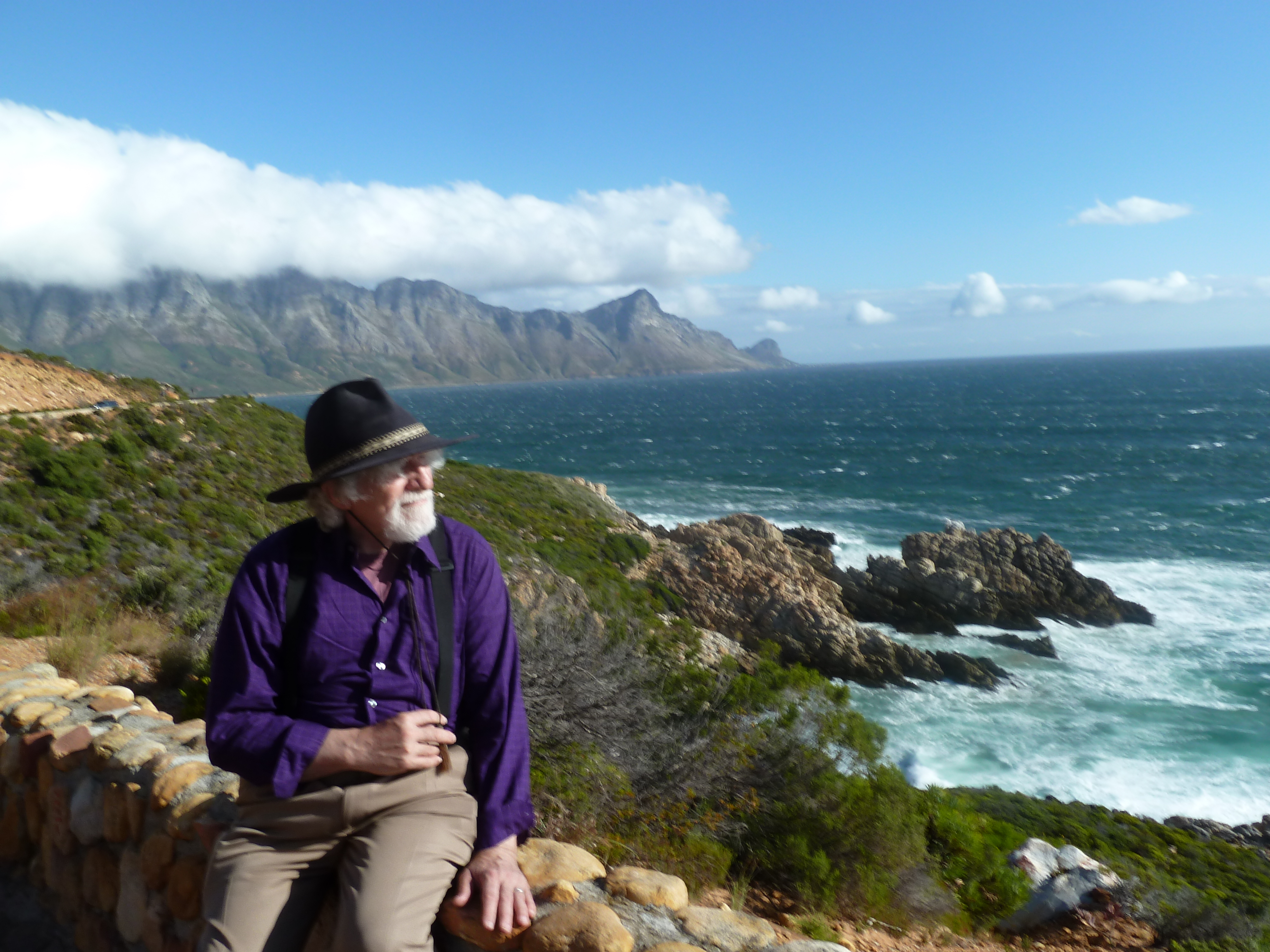
- Henderson on his 70th birthday in South Africa
- Born: February 23, 1939; United States
- Died: December 20, 2018 (aged 79)
- Known for: Topology, algebraic geometry, history of mathematics and educational mathematics
- Spouse: Daina Taimina
- Scientific career
- Fields: Mathematician

David Wilson Henderson (February 23, 1939 – December 20, 2018) was a professor of Mathematics in the Department of Mathematics at Cornell University. His work ranges from the study of topology, algebraic geometry, history of mathematics and exploratory mathematics for teaching prospective mathematics teachers. His papers in the philosophy of mathematics place him with the intuitionist school of philosophy of mathematics. His practical geometry, which he put to work and discovered in his carpentry work, gives a perspective of geometry as the understanding of the infinite spaces through local properties. Euclidean geometry is seen in his work as extendable to the spherical and hyperbolic spaces starting with the study and reformulation of the 5th postulate.

He was struck by an automobile in a pedestrian crosswalk on December 19, 2018, and died the next day from his injuries.

== Bibliography ==
- Henderson, D. W. & Taimina, D. (2001). Crocheting the Hyperbolic Plane, Mathematical Intelligencer, vol.23, No. 2, 2001, pp. 17–28.
- Henderson, D. W. & Taimina, D. (2001). Essays in Mathematics? (Latvian), Skolotajs (Teacher journal), 4(28), 2001, Riga, pp. 27–31.
- Henderson, D. W. & Taimina, D. (2001). Geometry, The Hutchinson Encyclopedia of Mathematics.
- Henderson, D. W. & Taimina, D. (2004). Non-Euclidean Geometries, Encyclopædia Britannica.
- Henderson, D. W. & Taimina, D. (2005). Experiencing Geometry: Euclidean and non-Euclidean with History, Prentice Hall, Upper Saddle River, NJ.
- Taimina, D. & Henderson, W. (2005). How to Use History to Clarify Common Confusions in Geometry, MAA Notes volume No.68, p. 57-73.
- Taimina, D. & Henderson, D. W. (2005). Experiencing Geometry: Euclidean and Non-Euclidean with History, 3rd Edition.-Hall, Upper Saddle River, NJ.
- Taimina, D. & Henderson, D. W. (2020) " Experiencing Geometry: Euclidean and non-Euclidean with History", 4th Edition, open source Project Euclid https://projecteuclid.org/euclid.bia/1598805325
- Taimina, D. & Henderson, D. W. (2006). Experiencing Meanings in Geometry, in Nathalie Sinclair, David Pimm, William Higginson eds, Mathematics and the Aesthetic, Springer, pp. 58–83.
