= Klopsteg Memorial Award =

Annual physics prize of the American Association of Physics Teachers

- Description: Awarded to a notable physicist who delivers a major presentation on a topic of current significance suitable for non-specialists
- Country: United States
- Presented by: American Association of Physics Teachers

The Klopsteg Memorial Award is an annual prize given to a notable physicist in memory of Paul E. Klopsteg. Established in 1990, it is awarded by the American Association of Physics Teachers.

The Klopsteg Memorial Award recipient is asked to make a major presentation at an AAPT Summer Meeting on a topic of current significance suitable for non-specialists.

== Award winners ==
Year	Awardee	Institution	Topic
2026	Stefanie Walch-Gassner	University of Cologne and President of the German Astronomical Society	
2025	Sean M. Carroll	Johns Hopkins University	The Many Worlds of Quantum Mechanics
2024	Don Lincoln	Fermi National Accelerator Laboratory	
2023	Jeffrey Bennett	University of Colorado Boulder	
2021	Helen Czerski	University College London	An Ocean of Physics
2020	James Kakalios	University of Minnesota	Physics of Superheroes
2019	Jodi Cooley	Southern Methodist University	
2018	Clifford V. Johnson	University of Southern California	Black Holes and Time Travel in Your Everyday Life
2017	John C. Brown	University of Glasgow	Black Holes and White Rabbits
2016	Margaret Wertheim	Institute For Figuring	Of Corals and the Cosmos: A Story of Hyperbolic Space
2015	David Weintraub	Vanderbilt University	Exoplanets: The Pace of Discovery and the Potential Impact on Humanity
2014	Donald W. Olson	Texas State University	Celestial Sleuth: Using Physics and Astronomy to Solve Mysteries in Art, History, and Literature
2011	James E. Hansen	NASA Goddard Institute for Space Studies	Halting Human-Made Climate Change: The Case for Young People and Nature
2010	Robert Scherrer	Vanderbilt University	Science and Science Fiction
2009	Lee Smolin	Perimeter Institute for Theoretical Physics	The Role of the Scientist as a Public Intellectual
2008	Michio Kaku	City University of New York	Physics of the Impossible
2007	Neil deGrasse Tyson	Astrophysicist and Director, Hayden Planetarium, American Museum of Natural History	Adventures in Science Literacy
2006	Lisa Randall	Harvard University	Warped Passages: Unraveling the Mysteries of the Universe's Hidden Dimensions
2005	Wendy Freedman	Carnegie Observatories	The Accelerating Universe
2004	Anton Zeilinger	University of Vienna	Quantum Experiments: From Philosophical Curiosity to a New Technology
2003	Sylvester James Gates	University of Maryland, College Park	Why Einstein Would Love Spaghetti in Fundamental Physics
2002	Barry C. Barish	California Institute of Technology	Catching the Waves with LIGO
2001	Virginia Trimble	University of California, Irvine	Cosmology: Man's Place in the Universe
2000	Terrence P. Walker	Ohio State University	The Big Bang: Seeing Back to the Beginning
1999	Michael S. Turner	University of Chicago	Cosmology: From Quantum Fluctuations to the Expanding Universe
1998	Sidney R. Nagel	The James Franck Institute	Physics at the Breakfast Table - Or Waking Up to Physics
1997	Max Dresden	Stanford University and Stanford Linear Accelerator	Scales, Macroscopic, Microscopic, Mesoscopic: Their Autonomy and Interrelation
1996	Margaret Geller	Harvard Smithsonian Center for Astrophysics, Optical Infrared Astronomy Division	
1995	Peter Franken	University of Arizona	Municipal Waste, Recycling, and Nuclear Garbage
1994	N. David Mermin	Cornell University	More Quantum Magic
1993	Charles P. Bean	Rensselaer Polytechnic Institute	An Invitation to Table-Top Physics Inside and in the Open Air
1992	Gabriel Wienreich	University of Michigan at Ann Arbor	What Science Knows about Violins And What It Doesn't Know, Am. J. Phys. 61, 1067 (1993).
1991	Paul K. Hansma	University of California, Santa Barbara	Seeing Atoms with the New Generation of Microscopes, Am. J. Phys. 59, 1067 (1991).

== See also ==
- List of physics awards
- List of prizes named after people
