= Ada Dietz =

American weaver and designer

Ada K. Dietz
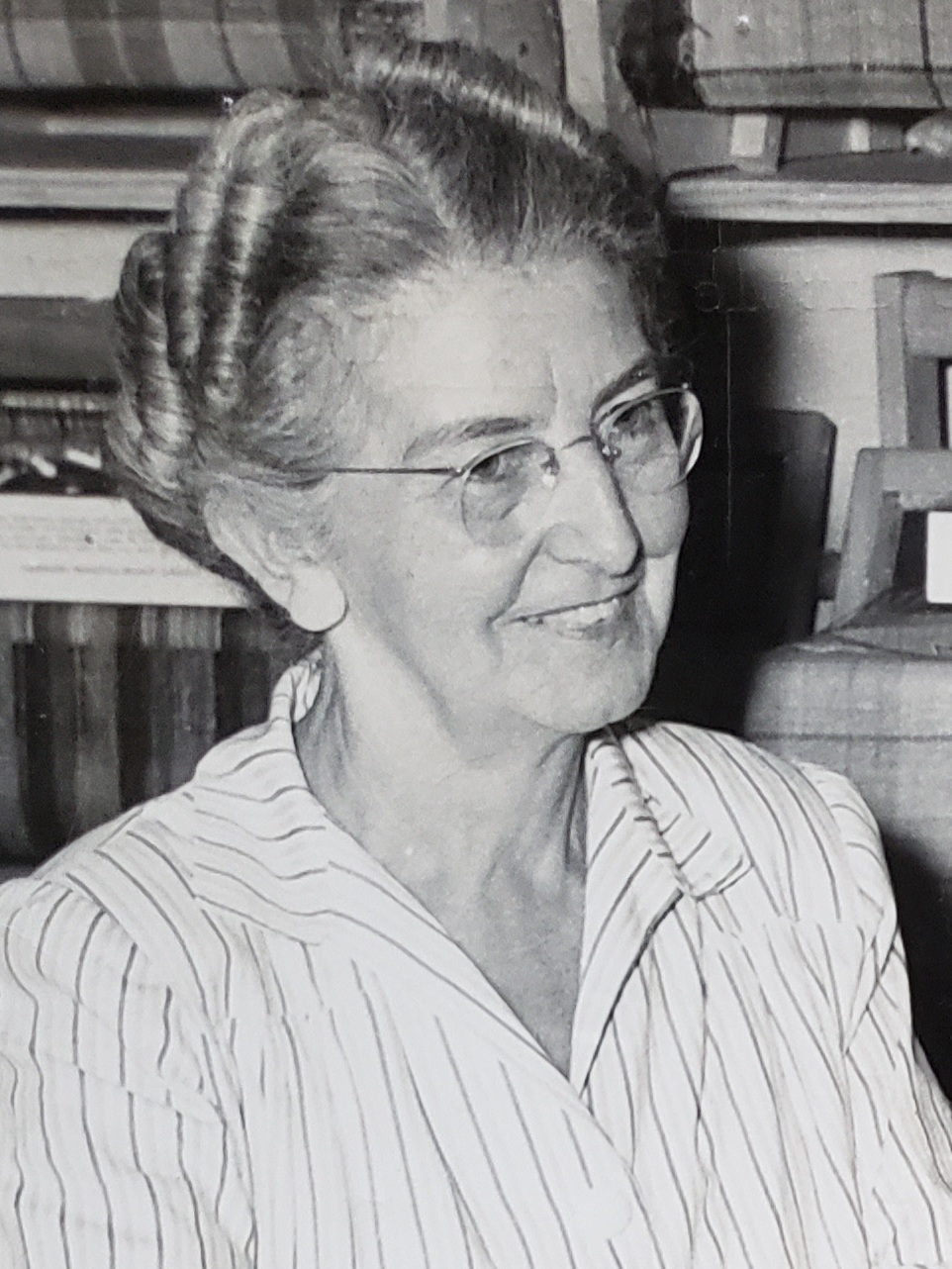
- Born: October 7, 1888; Michigan
- Died: January 12, 1981 (aged 92); San Bernardino County California
- Resting place: Elmwood Cemetery
- Known for: Mathematics and fiber arts
- Notable work: Algebraic Expressions in Handwoven Textiles, 1949

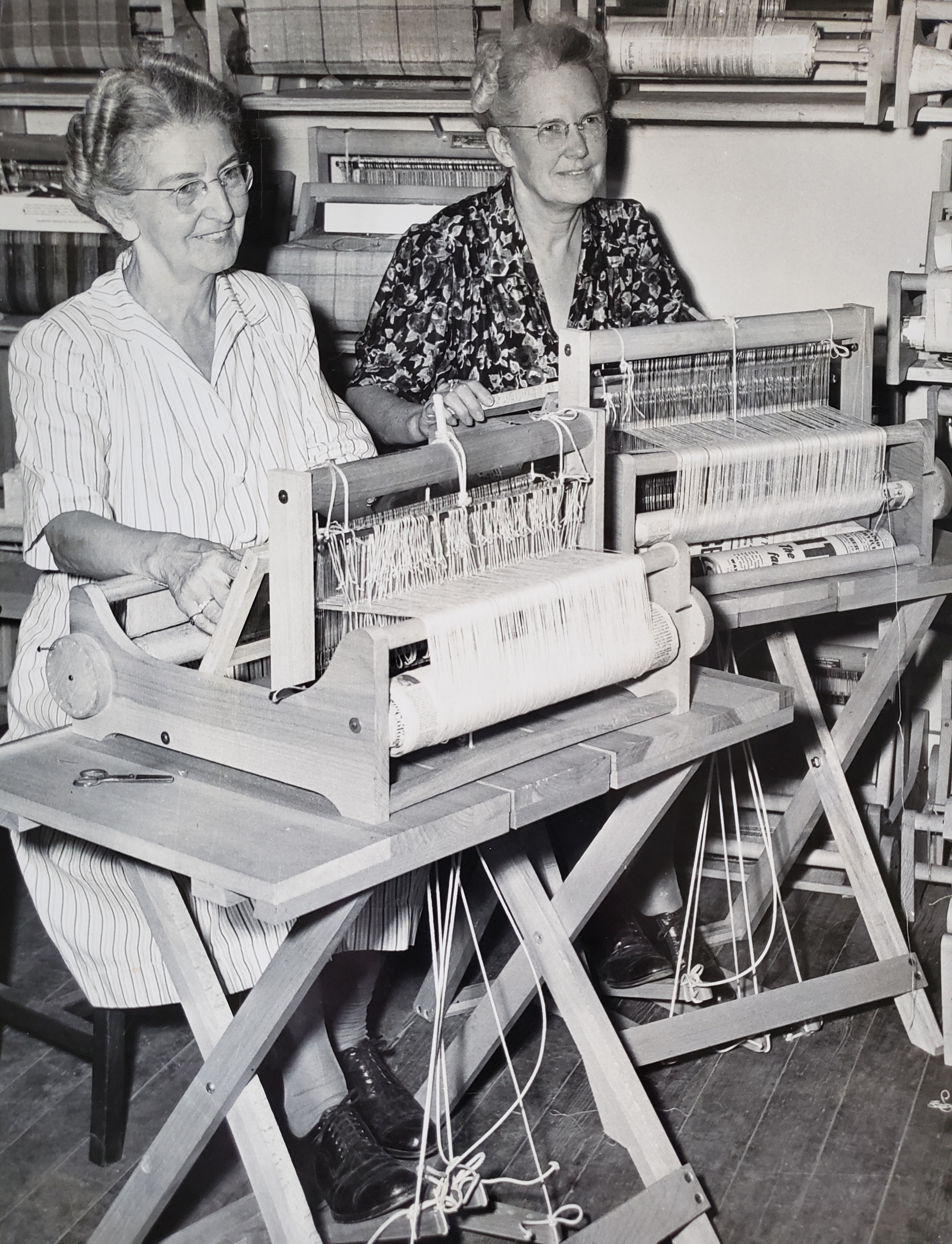
Ada K. Dietz (left) and Ruth E. Foster (right) weaving on Lou Tate Little Looms at the Little Loomhouse, Louisville, KY, circa late 1940s.

Ada K. Dietz (October 7, 1888 – January 12, 1981) was an American weaver best known for her 1949 monograph Algebraic Expressions in Handwoven Textiles, which defines a novel method for generating weaving patterns based on algebraic patterns. Her method employs the expansion of multivariate polynomials to devise a weaving scheme. Dietz' work is still well-regarded today, by both weavers and mathematicians. Along with the references listed below, Griswold (2001) cites several additional articles on her work.

== Algebraic weaving ==
Ada Dietz developed her algebraic method in 1946 while living in Long Beach, California. An avid weaver, Dietz drew upon her experience as a former math teacher to devise a threading pattern based on a cubic binomial expansion. She describes her idea as follows:

"Taking the cube of a binomial [ (x + y)^{3}], I approached [the pattern] in the way applied algebraic problems are approached - by letting x equal one unknown and y equal the other unknown.

"In this case, x equaled the first and second harnesses, and y equaled the third and fourth harnesses. Then it was simply a matter of expanding the cube of the binomial and substituting the values of x and y to write the threading draft." (Dietz, 1949)

A piece based on the formula (a + b + c + d + e + f)^{2}, submitted to the Little Loomhouse Country Fair in Louisville, Kentucky received a positive response, which prompted a collaboration between Dietz and Little Loomhouse's founder, Lou Tate. The fruits of the collaboration included the booklet Algebraic Expressions in Handwoven Textiles and a traveling exhibit which continued throughout the 1950s.

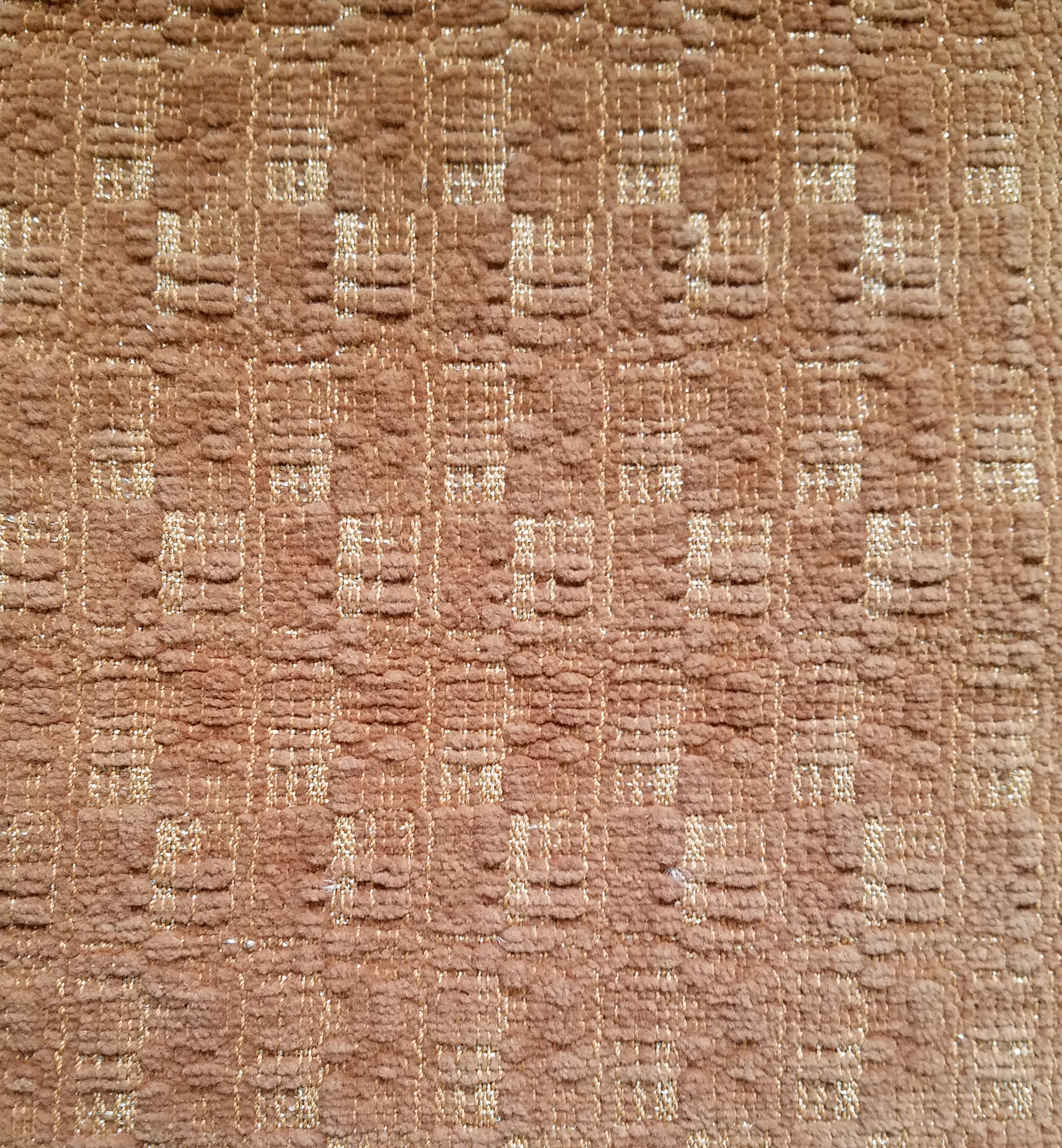
Square of a Trinomial Overshot Weave by Ada K. Dietz, circa 1950s, warp: tan 20/2, tabby: silver, pattern: brown chenille

== History and development ==
Dietz was a high school biology and math teacher when she met Ruth E. Foster, a professional weaver with the Hewson Studios in Los Angeles. Foster's work inspired Dietz to begin studying weaving at Wayne University in Detroit under Nellie Sargent Johnson. Her experiments in writing weaving drafts began in Johnson's classes. It was later when Dietz and Foster were driving north to study at the Banff School of Fine Arts in Canada that she began using mathematical equations. She wanted "a reason for writing a draft in a definite way", and went to the mathematical equations she had worked with for so long.

== See also ==
- Mathematics and fiber arts

== Sources ==
- Dietz, Ada K. (1949). Algebraic Expressions in Handwoven Textiles (PDF). Louisville, Kentucky: The Little Loomhouse. Archived from the original (PDF) on 2016-02-22.
- Griswold, Ralph (2001). "Design Inspirations from Multivariate Polynomials, Part 1" (PDF).
- Redfield, Gail (1959). "Variations on an Algebraic Equation". Handweaver & Craftsman (Summer): 46-49
- Schneider, Lana (1998). "Algebraic Expressions: Designs for Weaving". Handwoven (Jan./Feb): 48–51.
- Schneider, Lana (1998). "Algebraic Expressions in Handwoven Textiles". Reproduced on the FiberArts web site.
