= Jodi Cooley =

American physicist

Jodi Ann Cooley (also published as Cooley-Sekula) is an American experimental physicist specializing in the search for particles that might constitute dark matter. She was formerly a professor of physics at Southern Methodist University and is currently the executive director of SNOLAB, an underground laboratory for dark matter physics and neutrino observation, located in Creighton Mine in Greater Sudbury, Ontario, Canada.

== Education and career ==
Cooley majored in applied mathematics and physics at the University of Wisconsin–Milwaukee, graduating in 1997. She did her graduate study in physics at University of Wisconsin - Madison, completing her Ph.D. in 2003 with the dissertation Searching for Neutrinos from Diffuse Astronomical Sources with the AMANDA-II Detector.

After postdoctoral research at the Massachusetts Institute of Technology, working on the Super-Kamiokande neutrino experiment, she worked as a postdoctoral researcher from 2004 to 2009 at Stanford University. There, her interests shifted from neutrinos to dark matter through her work on the Cryogenic Dark Matter Search CDMS-II experiment in the Soudan Underground Mine in Minnesota.

She became an assistant professor at Southern Methodist University in 2009 and was tenured as an associate professor in 2014, continuing her work with the Soudan Cryogenic Dark Matter Search. In 2022 she was named executive director of SNOLAB.She also currently holds the title of professor of Physics at Queen's University in Kingston, ON.

== Recognition ==
In 2018, Cooley was named a Fellow of the American Association for the Advancement of Science. In 2022, she was named a Fellow of the American Physical Society (APS), after a nomination from the APS Division of Particles and Fields, "for outstanding contributions to searches for dark matter particles".

In 2019 the American Association of Physics Teachers named her as the recipient of their Klopsteg Memorial Lecture Award.
