= Mónica Rodríguez (astrophysicist) =

Spanish astronomer

Mónica Rodríguez Guillén is a Spanish astrophysicist and cosmochemist whose research includes the chemical composition of interstellar clouds including H II regions and planetary nebulae. She works in Tonantzintla, Mexico, as a researcher in the National Institute of Astrophysics, Optics and Electronics (INAOE).

== Education and career ==
Rodríguez is originally from Petrer in Spain, where she was born in 1969.

She studied astrophysics as an undergraduate at the University of La Laguna in Tenerife before traveling to England as an Erasmus scholar at University College London, where she earned a bachelor's degree in 1992. She returned to La Laguna for doctoral study in astrophysics, completing her PhD in 1998. Her doctoral dissertation, La abundancia de hierro en regiones H II galácticas [The iron abundance in galactic H II regions], was supervised by Mexican astronomer Guido Münch.

She became a researcher at INAOE in 2000.

== Recognition ==
Rodríguez is a member of the Mexican Academy of Sciences.
