= Guido Münch =

Mexican astronomer and astrophysicist (1921–2020)

Guido Münch Paniagua
- Born: June 9, 1921; San Cristóbal de las Casas
- Died: April 29, 2020 (aged 98); Pasadena
- Education: National Autonomous University of Mexico; University of Chicago
- Awards: Guggenheim Fellowship; NASA Exceptional Scientific Achievement Medal; American Academy of Arts and Sciences; National Academy of Sciences
- Scientific career
- Fields: Astronomy; Astrophysics
- Institutions: Tacubaya Observatory; Yerkes Observatory; Caltech; Max Planck Institute for Astronomy; University of Heidelberg; Calar Alto Observatory; Instituto de Astrofísica de Canarias
- Thesis: Problems of Radiative Transfer in the Theory of Stellar Atmospheres (1946)
- Doctoral advisor: Subrahmanyan Chandrasekhar
- Doctoral students: Judith Gamora Cohen; James Gunn; Robert A. Parker; Mónica Rodríguez; Virginia Trimble

Guido Münch Paniagua (June 9, 1921 – 29 April 2020) was a Mexican astronomer and astrophysicist.

== Biography ==
Münch was born in San Cristobal de las Casas, Mexico. He studied civil engineering and mathematics at the National Autonomous University of Mexico, receiving his bachelor's degree in civil engineering and mathematics in 1939 and his master's degree in mathematics in 1944. He then went to the University of Chicago, where he was published in Astronomy and Astrophysics in 1946 ("Problems of radiative transfer in the theory of stellar atmospheres"). He then went to the Tacubaya Observatory of the University of Mexico, but returned to the University of Chicago in 1947 as an instructor, and became an assistant professor in 1949. There he worked at the Yerkes Observatory, and worked with astrophysicist Subrahmanyan Chandrasekhar on radiative transfer in stars. He also worked with Gerhard Herzberg and William Wilson Morgan on astronomic spectroscopy. He moved to Caltech in 1951, becoming professor there and working at the Mount Wilson and Palomar observatories.

From 1977 to 1991, Münch was Director at the Max Planck Institute for Astronomy in Heidelberg, in addition to serving as professor at the University of Heidelberg. He also worked at the joint German-Spanish Calar Alto Observatory, and at the Instituto de Astrofísica de Canarias in Tenerife (from 1992 to 1996).

Münch studied the theory of stellar atmospheres, stellar spectroscopy, interstellar matter, the spectroscopy of nebulae, the structure of galaxies, solar physics and planetology. He worked in both observation and theory.

He died in April 2020 at the age of 98.

== Awards ==
In 1944, 1945 and 1958 Münch was named a Guggenheim Fellow. He was a member of the American Academy of Arts and Sciences (1962), the National Academy of Sciences (1967) and in 1982 he became a founding member of the Third World Academy of Sciences. He was an honorary doctor of the National Mexican Institute for Astrophysics, Optics and Electronics.

In 1968, he received the NASA Medal of Exceptional Scientific Merit for his involvement in the Mariner, Viking and Pioneer missions on infrared radiometry. (His work on the Martian atmosphere led to a critically important downward revision in estimates of the planet's atmospheric density.) In 1989, he was awarded a Prince of Asturias Award, and in the same year, the International Astronomical Union organized a conference in his honor in Granada. In 1998 he received the Spanish Civil Order of Alfonso X, the Wise, with the Grand Cross.

His doctoral advisees have included Judith Gamora Cohen, Jim Gunn, Robert A. Parker, Mónica Rodríguez, and Virginia Trimble.

== Writings ==
- "Interstellar Absorption Lines in Distant Stars", Astrophys. J., 1957
- "The Theory of Model Stellar Model Atmospheres", in Jesse Greenstein Stellar Atmospheres, University of Chicago Press 1960
- "An Analysis of the Spectrum of Mars", Astrophys. Journal, vol. 139, 1964
- "Galactic Structure and Interstellar Absorption Lines", in Adriaan Blaauw, Maarten Schmidt Galactic Structure, University of Chicago Press, 1965
- "The Structure of the Atmosphere on the Major Planets", with Laurence M. Trafton, Journal of the Atmospheric Sciences, vol. 26, 1969, p. 813
- "Helium Abundance on Jupiter", with Donald M. Hunten, Space Science Reviews, vol. 14, 1973, p. 433-443
