= David Weintraub (physicist) =

David A. Weintraub is an American astrophysicist and is the Professor of Astronomy at Vanderbilt University.

== Early life and education ==
Weintraub was raised Jewish, and developed an early interest in religion and astronomy, especially the persecution of Galileo Galilei by the Roman Catholic Church.

== Career ==
Weintraub authored Is Pluto a Planet? A Historical Journey through the Solar System in 2006. He authored Exoplanets: The Pace of Discovery and the Potential Impact on Humanity. In 2015, Weintraub was awarded the Klopsteg Memorial Award by the American Association of Physics Teachers.

He published Religion and Extraterrestrial life: How will we deal with it?, in 2014. The book explores various religious reactions to the possibility of extraterrestrial life, and speculates on the potential theological ramifications discovering alien life.

In 2018, he published Life On Mars: What to know before we go, which details the history of mankind's fascination with the possibility of life on Mars.

In 2022, Weintraub edited the volume The Sky Is For Everyone, with Virginia Trimble. The book was published by Princeton University Press, and details the biographies and accomplishments of women in the field of astronomy.
