= Robert A. Parker =

American astronomer and astronaut (born 1936)

Robert Parker
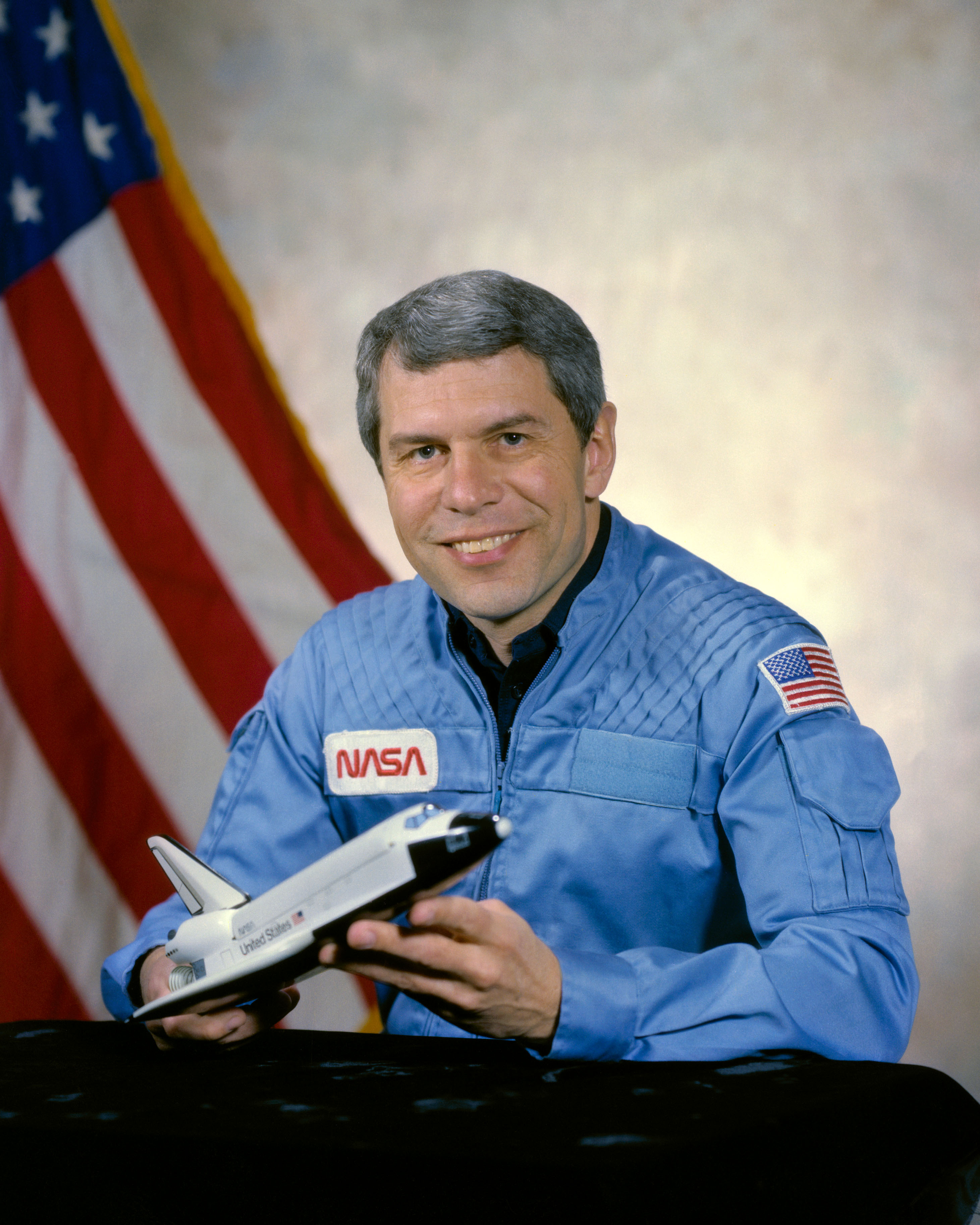
- Born: Robert Allan Ridley Parker; December 14, 1936 (age 89); New York City, New York, U.S.
- Education: Amherst College (BS); California Institute of Technology (MS, PhD)
- Space career

NASA astronaut
- Time in space: 19d 6h 52m
- Selection: NASA Group 6 (1967)
- Missions: STS-9; STS-35
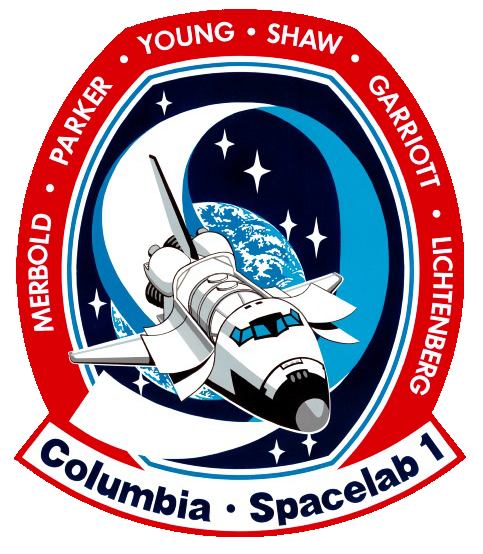
- Mission insignia
- Retired: August 31, 2005
- Scientific career
- Fields: Physics; Astronomy
- Thesis: The Physical Conditions Pertaining to Some Possible Supernova Remnants (1963)
- Doctoral advisor: Guido Münch

Robert Allan Ridley Parker (born December 14, 1936) is an American physicist and astronomer, former director of the NASA Management Office at the Jet Propulsion Laboratory, and a retired NASA astronaut. He was a mission specialist on two Space Shuttle missions, STS-9 and STS-35.

He has logged over 3,500 hours flying time in jet aircraft and 463 hours in space.

== Biography ==
=== Early life ===
Parker was born December 14, 1936, in New York City, but grew up in Shrewsbury, Massachusetts. He attended primary and secondary schools in Shrewsbury. He received a BA in astronomy and physics from Amherst College in 1958 and a PhD in astronomy from the California Institute of Technology in 1962. His doctoral dissertation, The physical conditions pertaining to some possible supernova remnants, was supervised by Guido Münch. Prior to his selection for astronaut training, Parker was an associate professor of astronomy at the University of Wisconsin–Madison.

=== NASA career ===
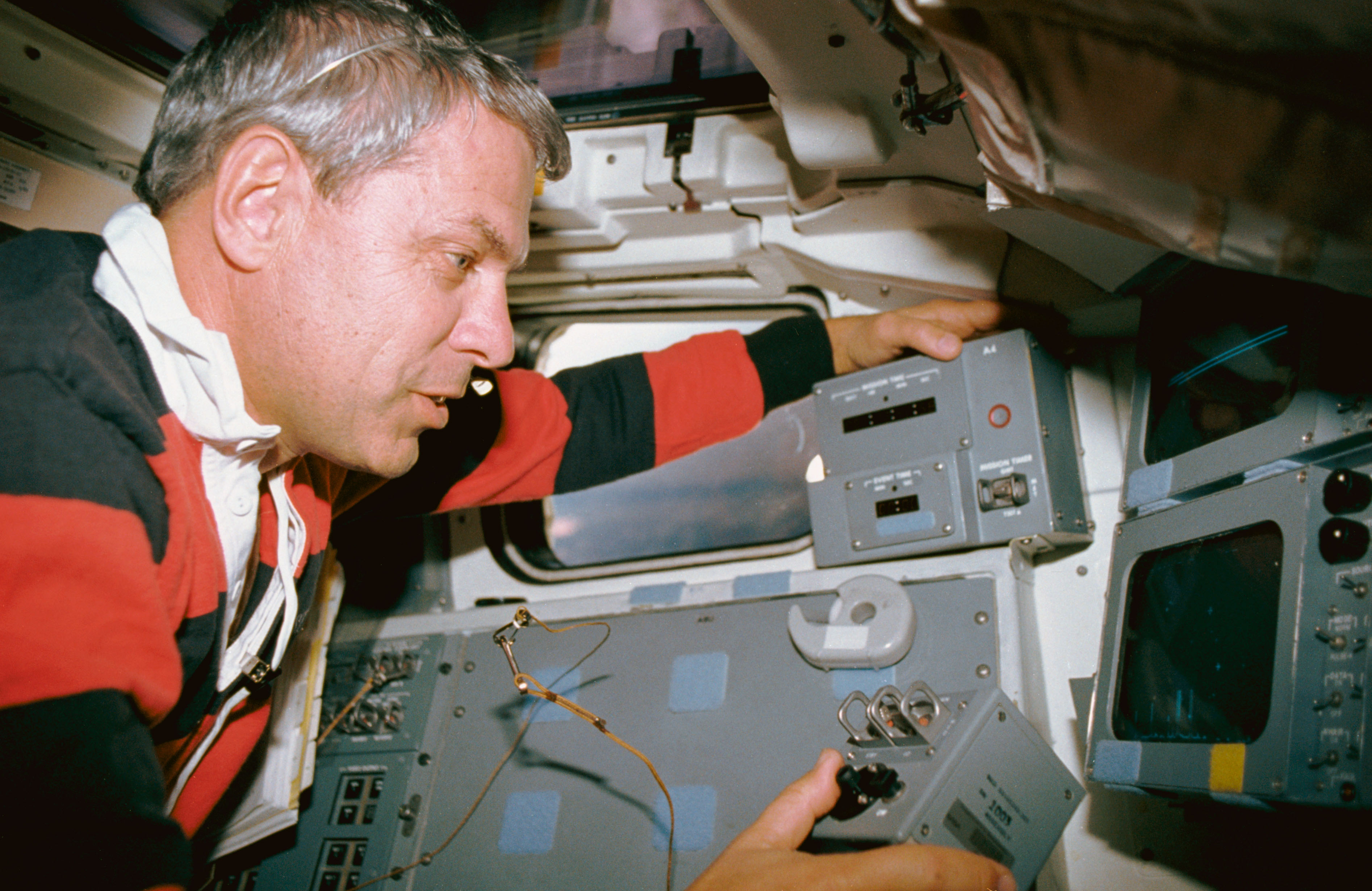
Parker points instruments on ASTRO-1 on Columbia's aft flight deck during STS-35

Parker was selected as a scientist-astronaut by NASA in August 1967. He was a member of the Astronaut Support Crews for the Apollo 15 and 17 missions, and was the person to whom the final words spoken by a man standing on the surface of the Moon (Gene Cernan) were addressed. Later, he served as program scientist for the Skylab Program Director's Office during the three crewed Skylab flights.

From March 1988 to March 1989, Parker was stationed at NASA Headquarters in Washington, D.C., where he served as director of the Space Flight/Space Station Integration Office.

A veteran of two Spacelab missions, Parker was a mission specialist on STS-9/Spacelab-1 (November 28–December 8, 1983) and on STS-35 (December 2–10, 1990), which featured the ASTRO-1 ultraviolet astronomy laboratory.

=== Post-NASA career ===
Parker was director of the Division of Policy and Plans for the Office of Space Flight at NASA Headquarters from January 1991 to December 1991. From January 1992 to November 1993, he was director of the Spacelab and Operations Program. From December 1993 to August 1997 he was manager of the Space Operations Utilization Program. In August 1997, Parker was named director of the NASA Management Office at the Jet Propulsion Laboratory in Pasadena, California. Parker retired from NASA on August 31, 2005.

== Personal life ==
Parker married the former Judy Woodruff of San Marino, California. They have five children and nine grandchildren. Parker resides with his wife in La Cañada Flintridge, California.

== Honors and memberships ==
Parker is a member of the American Astronomical Society and of the International Astronomical Union. He was awarded the NASA Exceptional Scientific Achievement Medal (1973) and the NASA Outstanding Leadership Medal (1974).

== Media ==
In the 1998 miniseries From the Earth to the Moon, Parker was portrayed by Chris Ellis.
