= Peter Franken =

American physicist (1928–1999)

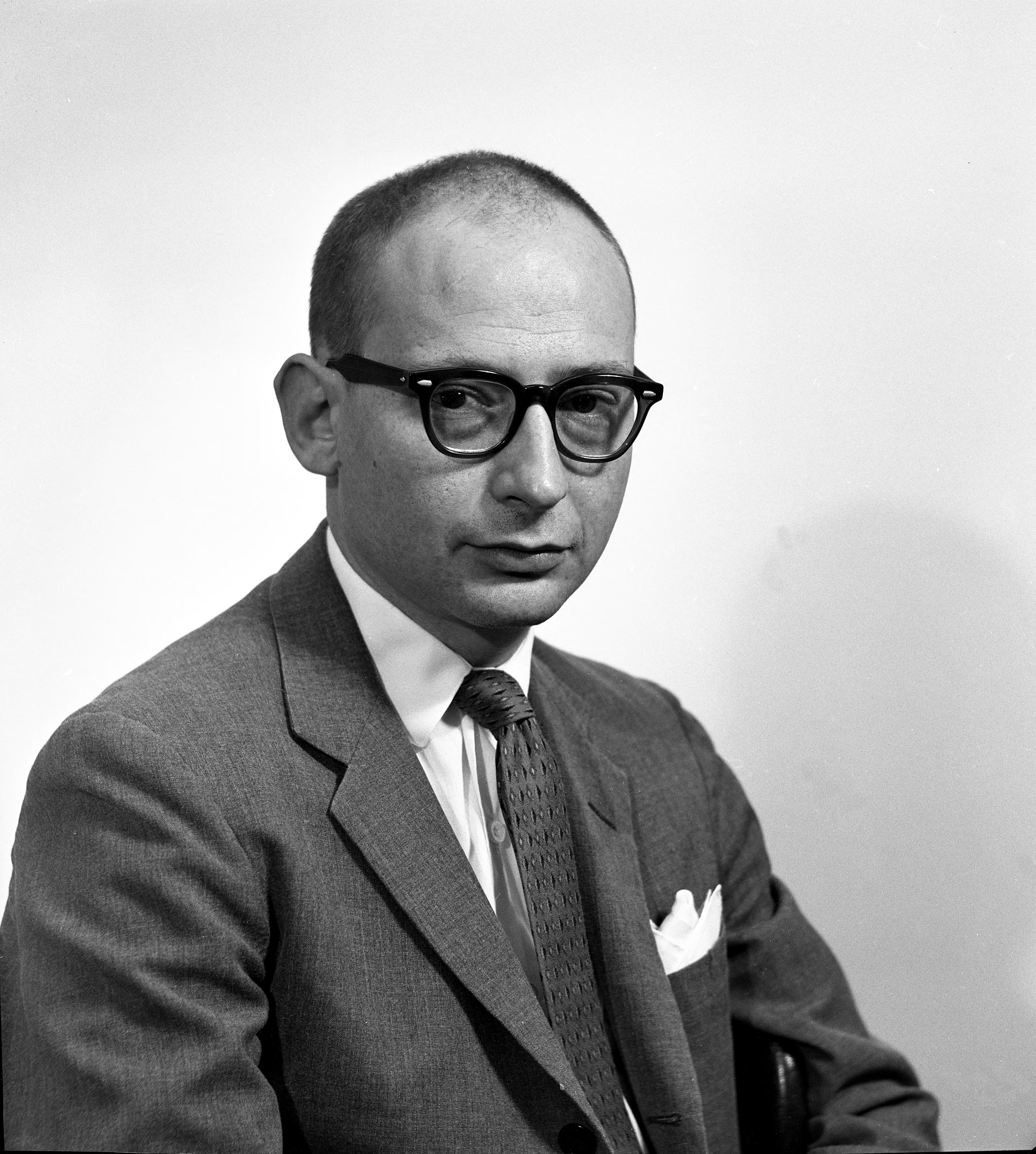
- Franken in 1962
- Born: November 10, 1928
- Died: March 11, 1999 (aged 70)
- Awards: Klopsteg Memorial Award (1995)
- Scientific career
- Fields: Physics
- Institutions: University of Michigan

Peter A. Franken (November 10, 1928 – March 11, 1999) was an American physicist who contributed to the field of nonlinear optics. He was president of the Optical Society of America in 1977. In 1961, Professor Peter Franken and his coworkers in the Randall Laboratory at the University of Michigan observed for the first time the second-harmonic generation. This event launched a golden age in optical physics that has led to applications in fields ranging from optical communications and biological imaging to X-ray generation and homeland security. In 1985 he contributed an oral history to the American Institute of Physics in which he describes background and details of his early work.

== See also ==
- The Optical Society#OSA presidents
- List of nominees for the Nobel Prize in Physics
