= Virginia Louise Trimble =

American astronomer (born 1943)

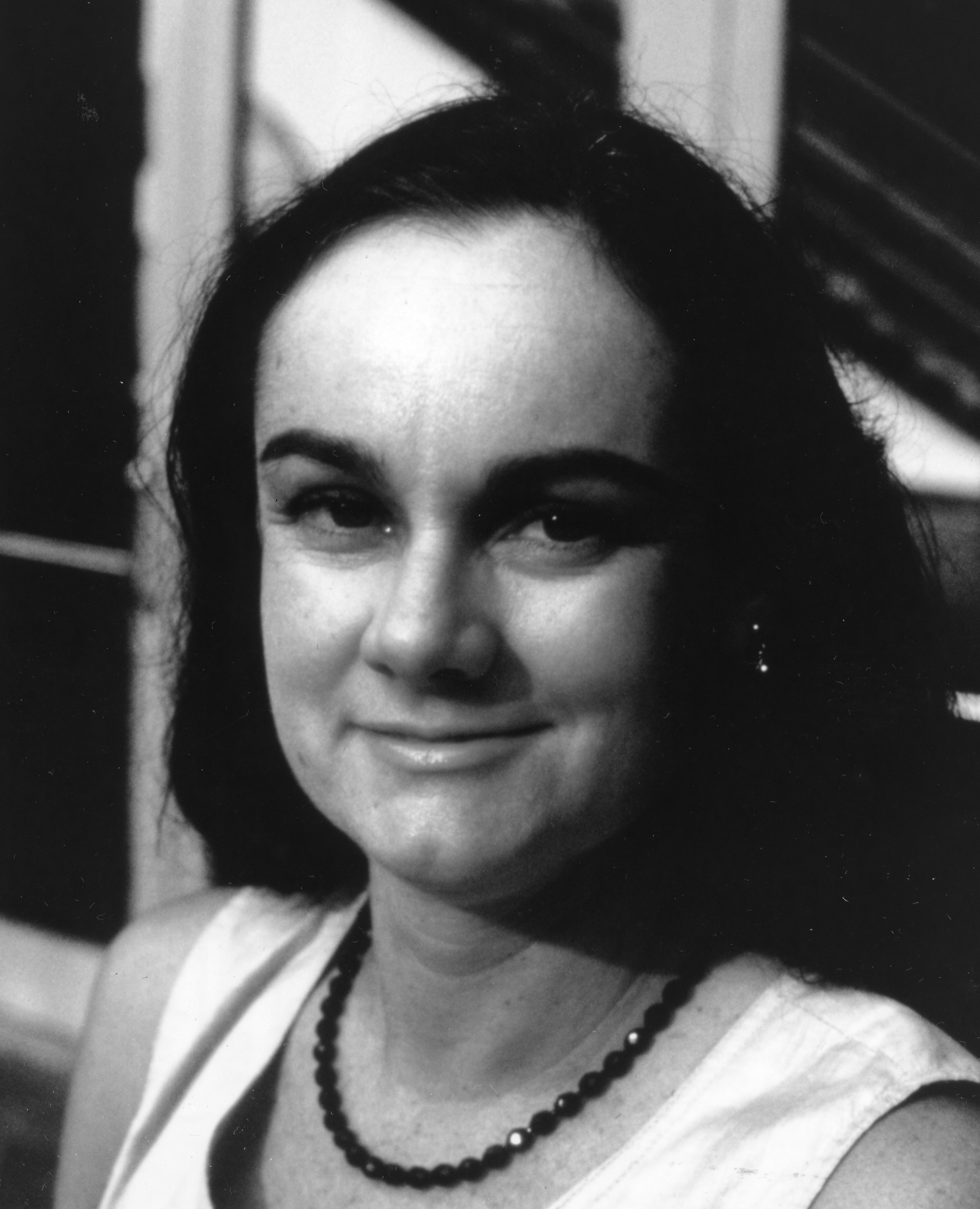
- Trimble in 1988
- Born: November 15, 1943 (age 82)
- Education: UCLA, Caltech, Cambridge
- Known for: Annual reviews of Astronomy and Astrophysics Research; Studies of telescope productivity
- Spouse: Joseph Weber
- Awards: NAS Award for Scientific Reviewing; Klopsteg Memorial Award; George Van Biesbroeck Prize honorary doctorate from the University of Valencia; Andrew Gemant Award
- Scientific career
- Fields: Astrophysics, cosmology, history of astronomy, history of science
- Thesis: Motions and structure of the filamentary envelope of the Crab Nebula
- Doctoral advisor: Guido Münch
- Website: http://www.faculty.uci.edu/profile.cfm?faculty_id=3060

Virginia Louise Trimble (born November 15, 1943) is an American astronomer specializing in the structure and evolution of stars and galaxies, and the history of astronomy. She has published more than 600 works in astrophysics, and dozens of other works in the history of other sciences. She is known for an annual review of astronomy and astrophysics research that was published in the Publications of the Astronomical Society of the Pacific, and often gives summary reviews at astrophysical conferences. In 2018, she was elected a Patron of the American Astronomical Society, for her many years of intellectual, organizational, and financial contributions to the society.

== Life ==
Trimble "grew up the only child of a chemist father and a mother with a flair for language, within easy driving distance of both UCLA and Caltech." While attending UCLA in 1962, she was the subject of a Life article titled "Behind a Lovely Face, a 180 I.Q." The following year, she was selected to promote The Twilight Zone television show as "Miss Twilight Zone" in a national publicity tour. She received her B.A. from UCLA in 1964 and her Ph.D. from the California Institute of Technology in 1968. At the time, the California Institute of Technology did not admit women students "except under exceptional circumstances," and she was only the second woman allowed access to the Palomar Observatory. Following a year of teaching at Smith College and two years postdoctoral work at the Institute of Theoretical Astronomy in Cambridge, Trimble joined the faculty of the University of California, Irvine in 1971, where she is now Professor of astronomy. She met University of Maryland, College Park Professor Joseph Weber, a pioneer in gravitational wave physics, in 1972 and they married 11 days later. From then until his death in 2000, she spent half of each academic year as a visiting professor at the University of Maryland. She was vice president of the International Astronomical Union's Executive Committee from 1994-2000, and vice president of the American Astronomical Society from 1997-2000.

== Honors ==
- She received the NAS Award for Scientific Reviewing in 1986, "for informing and enlightening the astronomical community by her numerous, comprehensive, scholarly, and literate reviews, which have elucidated many complex astrophysical questions"
- She was awarded the Klopsteg Memorial Award from the American Association of Physics Teachers in 2001, "for her leadership, her contributions to the literature, and her dedication as a teacher"
- She received the George Van Biesbroeck Prize in 2010, for "many years of dedicated service to the national and international communities of astronomers, including her expert assessments of progress in all fields of astrophysics and her significant roles in supporting organizations, boards, committees and foundations in the cause of astronomy."
- She was awarded the 2019 Andrew Gemant Award by the American Institute of Physics (AIP)
- She was elected a Legacy Fellow of the American Astronomical Society in 2020.
- The main-belt asteroid 9271 Trimble, discovered by astronomers Eleanor Helin and Schelte Bus in 1978, was named in her honor. The official naming citation was published by the Minor Planet Center on 31 January 2018 (M.P.C. 108696).
- She was awarded the 2024 Abraham Pais Prize for History of Physics by the American Physical Society.

== Selected works ==
- Trimble, Virginia (1992). Visit to Small Universe. Masters of Modern Physics. Springer Science & Business Media. ISBN 978-0-88318-792-0.
- Trimble, Virginia (1987). "Existence and nature of dark matter in the universe". Annual Review of Astronomy and Astrophysics. 25: 425–472. Bibcode:1987ARA&A..25..425T. doi:10.1146/annurev.aa.25.090187.002233. S2CID 123199266.
- Hansen, Carl J.; Kwaler, Steven D.; Trimble, Virginia (2012). Stellar Interiors: Physical Principles, Structure, and Evolution (2 ed.). Springer. ISBN 978-1-4419-9110-2.
- Trimble, Virginia (1975). "The origin and abundances of the chemical elements" (PDF). Reviews of Modern Physics. 47 (4): 877. Bibcode:1975RvMP...47..877T. doi:10.1103/RevModPhys.47.877.
- Motions and structure of the filamentary envelope of the Crab Nebula (Thesis).
- Virginia Trimble; Thomas R. Williams; Katherine Bracher; Richard Jarrell; Jordan D. Marché; F. Jamil Ragep, eds. (2009). Biographical Encyclopedia of Astronomers. Springer. ISBN 978-0-387-35133-9.
