= Triangulum II =

Galaxy in the constellation Triangulum

Observation data (J2000 epoch)
- Constellation: Triangulum
- Right ascension: 02^{h} 13^{m} 17.4^{s}
- Declination: +36° 10′ 42.4″
- Distance: 97.8 ± 6.5 kly (30 ± 2 kpc)

Characteristics
- Mass/Light ratio: 3600 (V) M_{☉}/L_{☉}
- Apparent size (V): 3.9′

Other designations
- Triangulum II, Tri II, Laevens 2, Lae 2

Triangulum II (Tri II or Laevens 2) is a dwarf galaxy close to the Milky Way Galaxy. Like other dwarf spheroidal galaxies, its stellar population is very old: the galaxy was quenched before 11.5 billion years ago. It contains only 1000 stars, yet is quite massive, having a solar mass to light ratio of 3600. This is an unusually high mass for such a small galaxy.

The distance from the centre of the Milky Way is 26 kpc (85 kly). The luminosity is 450 times that of the Sun. This makes it one of the dimmest known galaxies. The 2D half light radius is 34 pc (110 ly). The galaxy was discovered in images taken by Pan-STARRS by Benjamin P. M. Laevens in 2015.

Triangulum II is a candidate for detecting WIMPs as a source of dark matter.
