= Crocheting Adventures with Hyperbolic Planes =

2009 book by Daina Taimina

- First edition
- Author: Daina Taimina
- Publisher: A K Peters
- Publication date: 2009
- ISBN: 9780203732731 (ebook)

Crocheting Adventures with Hyperbolic Planes is a book on crochet and hyperbolic geometry by Daina Taimiņa. It was published in 2009 by A K Peters, with a 2018 second edition by CRC Press.

== Topics ==
The book is on the use of crochet to make physical surfaces with the geometry of the hyperbolic plane. The full hyperbolic plane cannot be embedded smoothly into three-dimensional space, but pieces of it can. Past researchers had made models of these surfaces out of paper, but Taimiņa's work is the first work to do so using textile arts. She had previously described these models in a research paper and used them as illustrations for an undergraduate geometry textbook, but this book describes more of the background for the project, makes it more widely accessible, and provides instructions for others to follow in making these models.

The book has nine chapters. The first chapter introduces the notion of the curvature of a surface, provides instructions for an introductory project in crocheting a patch of the hyperbolic plane, and provides an initial warning about the exponential growth in the area of this plane as a function of its radius, which will cause larger crochet projects to take a very long time to complete. Chapter two covers more concepts in the geometry of the hyperbolic plane, connecting them to crocheted models of the plane.

The next three chapters take a step back to look at the broader history of the topics discussed in the book: geometry and its connection to human arts and architecture in chapter 3, crochet in chapter 4, and non-Euclidean geometry in chapter 5. Chapters 6, 7, and 8 cover specific geometric objects with negatively-curved surfaces, including the pseudosphere, helicoid, and catenoid, investigate mathematical toys, and use these crocheted models "to explore otherwise hard to visualize objects". A final chapter covers the applications of hyperbolic geometry and its ongoing research interest.

== Audience and reception ==
The book is written for a general audience. However, although suggesting that it has a place on mathematical coffee tables, reviewer Keith Leatham wonders who its real readers are likely to be. Reviewer Hinke Osinga, however, feels that the book can be of interest to readers interested in either crochet or mathematics, rather than (as Leatham suggests) requiring both interests. She writes "I highly recommend this book, perhaps not only as a beautiful coffee-table book with the subtle message that mathematics is fun, but also because crochet is a perfect tool for testing and exploring deep mathematical theories."

== Recognition ==
Crocheting Adventures with Hyperbolic Planes won the 2009 Bookseller/Diagram Prize for Oddest Title of the Year. It also won the 2012 Euler Book Prize of the Mathematical Association of America.
