= Margaret Wertheim =

Australian science writer (born 1958)

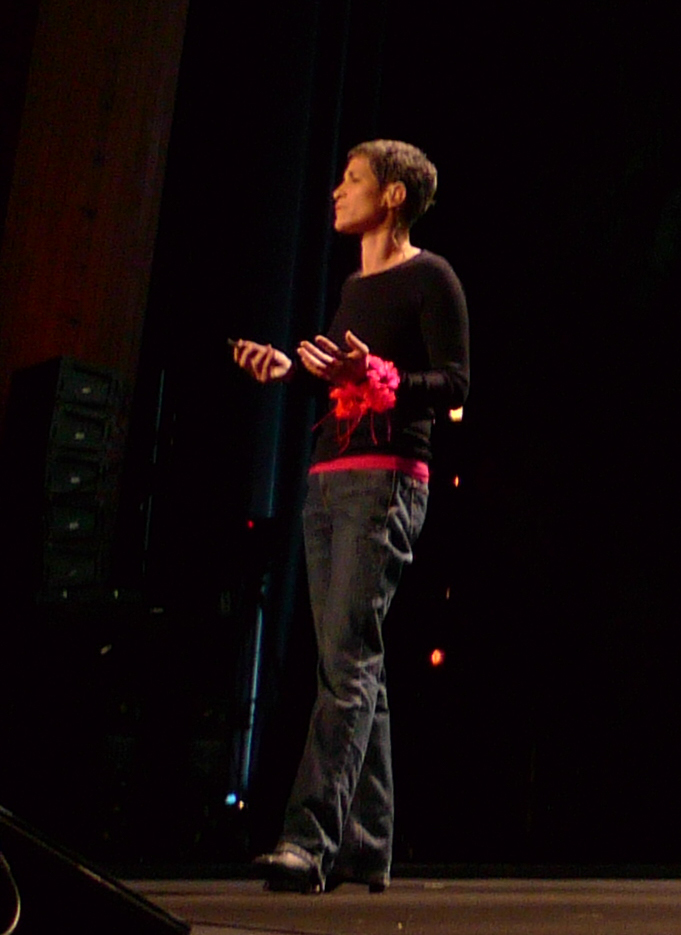
Wertheim giving a TED Talk about her Crochet Coral Reef in 2009

Margaret Wertheim (born 20 August 1958) is an Australian-born science writer, curator, and artist based in the United States. She is the author of books on the cultural history of physics, and has written about science, including for the New York Times, Los Angeles Times, Guardian, Aeon and Cabinet. Wertheim and her twin sister, Christine Wertheim, are co-founders of the Institute For Figuring (IFF), a Los Angeles–based non-profit organization through which they create projects at the intersection of art, science and mathematics. Their IFF projects include their Crochet Coral Reef, which has been shown at the 2019 Venice Biennale, Hayward Gallery (London), Museum of Arts and Design (NYC), and the Smithsonian's National Museum of Natural History. For her work with public science engagement, Wertheim won the 2016 Klopsteg Memorial Award from the American Association of Physics Teachers and Australia's Scientia Medal (2017).

== Education and research ==
Wertheim's education includes two bachelor's degrees, a Bachelor of Science in pure and applied physics from the University of Queensland and a Bachelor of Arts in pure mathematics and computing from the University of Sydney.

Wertheim has been a research associate at the American Natural Museum of Natural History located in New York, and is a fellow at the Los Angeles Institute for the Humanities. She is currently a PhD candidate and researcher at Deakin University. She was the Discovery Fellow (2012-2013) at the University of Southern California, as well as the Vice Chancellor's Fellow (2015) at the University of Melbourne.

== Career ==
=== Books ===
Wertheim is the author of a trilogy that considers the role of theoretical physics in the cultural landscape of modern Western society. The first, Pythagoras' Trousers, is a history of the relationship between physics, religion and gender relations. Reviewing the book in The Independent, Jenny Turner writes that the introduction states the book's argument elegantly and compellingly; but the text disappointed her by losing sight of what Turner thought its most interesting goal, telling how physics has been motivated by "fantasies of universal mastery". The book offered a critique of sexism in science and proposed systemic historical reasons why physics has been so un-open to women since its inception in Pythagorean principles 2500 years ago.

The second, The Pearly Gates of Cyberspace, charts the history of scientific thinking about space from Dante to the Internet. The thesis of the book is that our conceptions of human selfhood are intimately entwined with our conceptions of space, and when our concepts of space change so do our views about the "self." In the medieval schema, there were two spaces of being: the physical space of the Earth, planets and stars, and the spiritual domain of Heaven and Hell. Here "man" was conceived as a creature of both body and soul, each aspect operating within its parallel realm. With the advent of a Newtonian cosmos and its purely physical depiction of space, "man" came to be envisioned as a solely material being. In the 1990s, the coming into being of cyberspace – to use William Gibson's term – ushered in a claim that this ethereal domain would re-open possibilities for activation of a spiritual side of our selves. Wertheim refutes this claim, and the book offered an early challenge to visions of cyber-utopia. Andrew Leonard, reviewing the book for The New York Times, calls Wertheim's thesis "ambitious and fascinating." Leonard finds her account of the evolution of physicists' concept of space impressive, but expresses the view that ultimately she loses faith in her thesis of cyberspace as a spiritual realm: even if there is, indeed, something human about a great network of relationships that "cannot be captured by an equation or a telescope". Yet as Britt Elvira Ruitenberg wrote on the website The First Supper, the purpose of the book was not to endorse cyber-spiritualism, but to challenge the very premise, this "dream of a virtual Eden that rapidly vanished away".

The third, Physics on the Fringe: Smoke Rings, Circlons, and Alternative Theories of Everything, looks at the idiosyncratic world of "outsider physicists" such as Jim Carter, people with little or no scientific training who develop their own alternative theories of the universe. Freeman Dyson, reviewing the book in The New York Review of Books, notes that it describes research by amateurs, who "offer an alternative set of visions ... concrete rather than abstract, physical rather than mathematical." The leading character is Jim Carter, a man with an "unshakable belief" in a theory of the whole universe constructed of "endless hierarchies of circlons", circular mechanical objects that reproduce and split like smoke rings. Unknown to Carter, his basic idea that atoms could be explained as subatomic smoke rings had already been proposed in the 1870s by the renowned English physicist William Thomson (later Baron Kelvin), and the Scottish mathematician P.G. Tait. Tait and Thomson's theory of vortex atoms has been called by the historian Helge Kragh "a Victorian theory of everything", and is now regarded as a kind of precursor to string theory.

=== Journalism ===
As a journalist, Wertheim has written for newspapers in various countries including The New York Times, Los Angeles Times, The Guardian, The Daily Telegraph, and Die Zeit. She has written science articles for magazines including New Scientist, The Sciences, Cabinet, Aeon, The Australian Review of Books, and Australian Geographic.

Her work has been included in The Best American Science Writing 2003, edited by Oliver Sacks; and Best Australian Science Writing (2015, 2016, 2018 by Newsouth Press); and Best Writing on Mathematics 2018 (Princeton University Press).

=== Television ===
Wertheim has scripted 10 television documentaries, as well as created and co-directed the award-winning series Catalyst, a six-part science and technology series for a teenage audience. She has produced several short films, and she wrote and directed the interactive Canadian public health program What About AIDS (1988), an early use of laser-disc technology. Wertheim lectures around the globe promoting science within a social justice context.

== Institute For Figuring ==
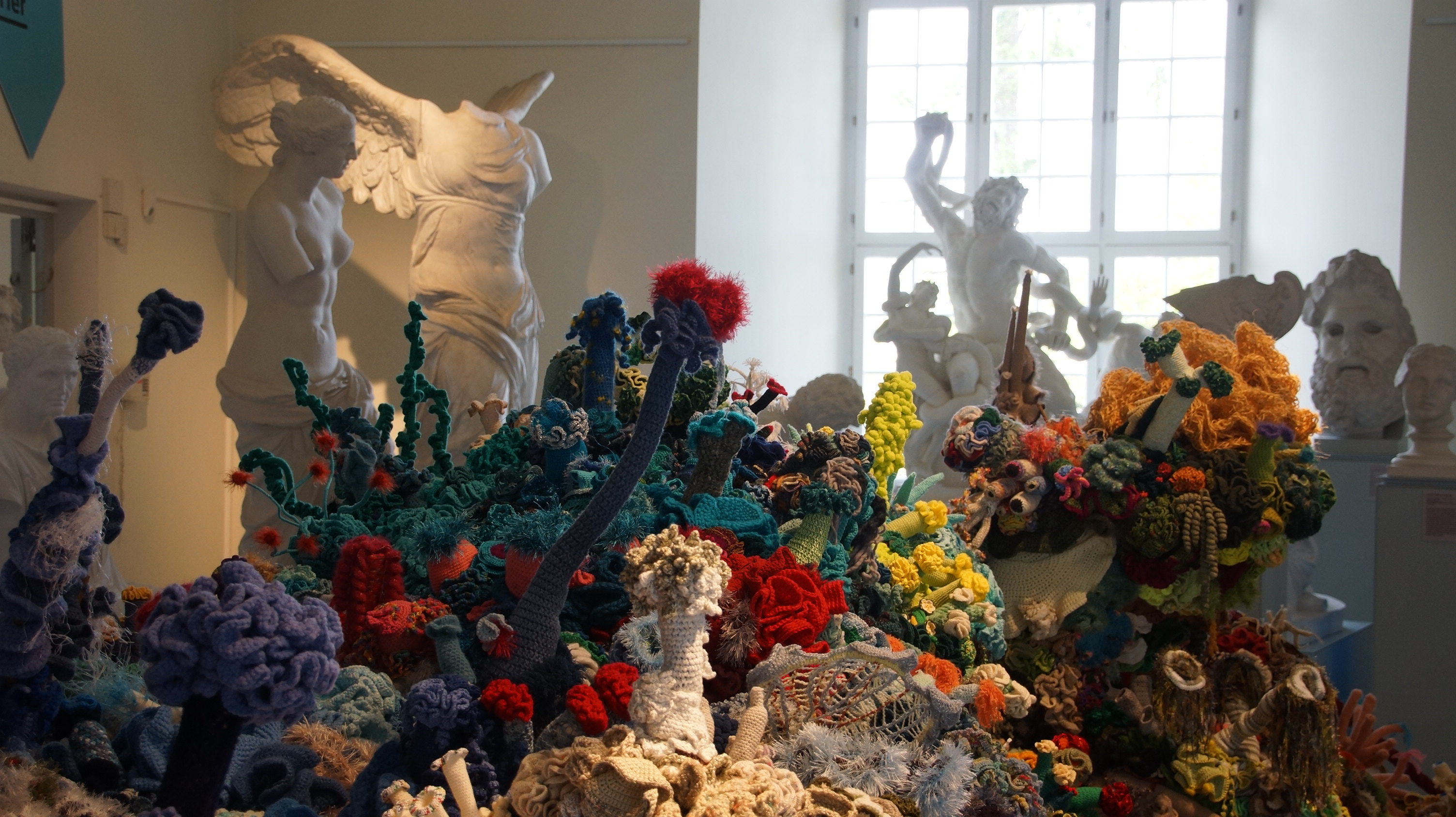
The Föhr Reef exhibited as part of the Crochet Coral Reef project by Margaret and Christine Wertheim and the Institute For Figuring in Tübingen (Germany) in 2013

In 2003, Wertheim and her twin sister Christine, faculty member of the Department of Critical Studies at the California Institute of the Arts, founded the Institute For Figuring, an organisation based in Los Angeles that promotes the poetic and aesthetic dimensions of science and mathematics. The Institute proposes that people can interact directly with mathematical and scientific ideas via material construction methods (such a crochet and paper folding), not simply via abstract equations and formulas. IFF is a nonprofit organization through which the sisters produce their Crochet Coral Reef project, an endeavor they created as an artistic response to climate change and the decimation of the Great Barrier Reef in their Australian homeland. The project also responds to the problem of oceanic plastic trash. While engaging audiences around the world with these environmental concerns, the Crochet Coral Reef also serves as way to teach non-Euclidean geometry. The frilly curling shapes of the Crochet Reef are manifestations of hyperbolic surfaces, the same forms made by living reef organisms. The ability to crochet such forms was discovered in 1997 by Daina Taimiņa, a Cornell University mathematician.

Through their work with IFF, the Wertheim sisters have created exhibitions on scientific and mathematical themes at art galleries and science museums around the world, including the 2019 Venice Biennale, Andy Warhol Museum in Pittsburgh, the Santa Monica Museum of Art, the Hayward Gallery, London, Art Center College of Design in Pasadena, California, Machine Project, the Museum of Jurassic Technology in Los Angeles, the Science Gallery at Trinity College in Dublin, Museum of Arts and Design, the Cooper Hewitt in New York, and the Smithsonian's National Museum of Natural History in Washington, D.C.,. These exhibitions and related public programming make mathematical and scientific concepts accessible to laypeople.

=== Crochet Coral Reef project ===
The Wertheim sister's Crochet Coral Reef project is one of the largest participatory art and science endeavors in the world. By creating giant installations that mimic living coral reefs, crocheted out of yarn and types of plastic, and using algorithms inspired by hyperbolic geometry, the project resides at the intersection of mathematics, science, handicraft, environmentalism and community art practice. The project teaches audiences about non-Euclidean geometry, while also engaging them with the subject of climate change and the decimation of reefs due to global warming. Wertheim’s use of crochet in the piece is largely due to Daina Taimina's discovery of the potential manifestation of the Impossible Hyperbolic Structure within the confines of the medium. The piece pays homage to the female mathematician who used a traditionally women's medium to redefine the course of the study as a whole. She is quoted as saying, "So here, in wool, through a domestic, feminine art, is the proof that the most famous postulate in mathematics is wrong". In this way, the piece not only comments on mathematics and climate change, but also feminism. As of early 2020, more than 10,000 people from New York and London, to Riga and Abu Dhabi, have actively contributed pieces to Crochet Coral Reef exhibitions in more than 40 cities and countries. More than two million people have seen these shows. In the foreword to the Crochet Coral Reef book, Donna Haraway calls the project "palpable, polymorphous, powerful and terrifying stitchery". Wertheim was invited to speak about the project in a Ted Talk in February 2009. The talk has been transcribed into 22 different languages and has surpassed 1.3 million views on the Ted website.

Since its beginning in 2005, Crochet Coral Reef has expanded into a constellation of individual reefs including a Bleached Reef, a Toxic Reef made of video-tape and plastic, a Branched Anemone Garden, and a giant Coral Forest – consisting of six large-scale sculptures, three crocheted from yarn and three from plastic. The plastic works are inspired by the Great Pacific Garbage Patch, a gigantic gyre of plastic debris in the Pacific Ocean.

=== Mosely Snowflake Sponge project ===
Jeannine Mosely with the giant model of the Menger Sponge at the Margaret Wertheim Institute for Figuring

Inspired by and working with Jeannine Mosely, a software engineer and origami artist, Margaret Wertheim curated a project at the University of Southern California to create a giant model of a fractal, constructed from 48,912 business cards. Professors, librarians, local artists, school students, and hundreds of USC students all participated in over 3,000 hours of work to complete this object. Discovered by Dr. Mosely in 2006, the Mosely snowflake is a cousin of the famous Menger sponge, the first three-dimensional fractal known to mathematicians which was first described by Karl Menger in 1926, and which Wertheim and Mosely also modelled physically at the Institute for Figuring. The Mosely Snowflake Sponge at USC was the first-ever instantiation of this new fractal form, and has since been reproduced by other groups around the world, including in Madagascar. On display at the University of Southern California's Doheny Memorial Library, the completed Mosely Snowflake Sponge fractal was constructed out of specially designed business cards coloured in the USC Trojans' palette of scarlet and gold, and using several geometric designs taken from the Oliver Byrne version of The First six Books of the Elements of Euclid.

== Awards and honours ==
- Print Journalism Award (2006) from the American Institute of Biological Sciences
- Theo Westenberger Award (2011) from the Autry Museum
- Discovery Fellow at the University of Southern California (2012-2013)
- Vice Chancellor's Fellow at the University of Melbourne (2015)
- AxS Award from the Pasadena Arts Council, now known as Fulcrum Arts (2016)
- Klopsteg Memorial Award (2016)
- Scientia Medal (2017)

== Books ==
Physics trilogy

- Pythagoras' Trousers: God, Physics, and the Gender Wars (1995)
- The Pearly Gates of Cyberspace: A History of Space from Dante to the Internet (1999)
- Physics on the Fringe: Smoke Rings, Circlons and Alternative Theories of Everything (2011)

Guides and catalogs

- A Field Guide to Hyperbolic Space (2005)
- A Field Guide to the Business Card Menger Sponge (2006)
- An Alternative Guide to the Universe: Mavericks, Outsiders, Visionaries. Exhibition catalog, Hayward Gallery, edited by Ralph Rugoff. (2013)
- Crochet Coral Reef with Christine Wertheim (2015)

== Exhibitions ==
- Margaret and Christine Wertheim. Value and Transformation of Corals, Museum Frieder Burda, Baden-Baden (29 January – 26 June 2022)
