= Nathalie Sinclair =

Canadian mathematician

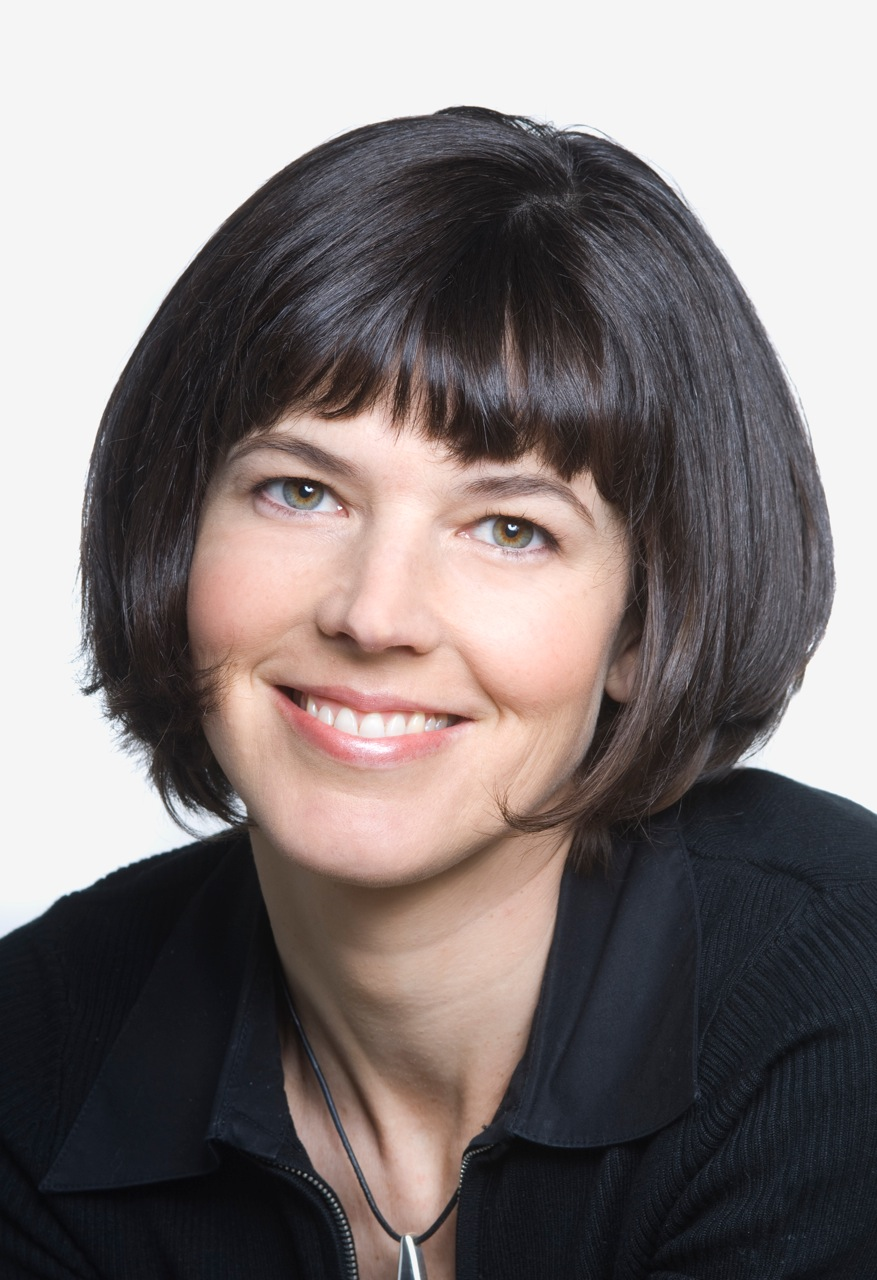
- Sinclair in 2011
- Born: 1970 (age 55–56)
- Children: Nadège Jackiw

Academic background
- Education: McGill University; PhD, Queen's University

Academic work
- Institutions: Michigan State University; Simon Fraser University

Nathalie Michelle Sinclair (born 1970) is a Canadian researcher in mathematics education who holds the Canada Research Chair in Tangible Mathematics Learning at Simon Fraser University in Vancouver.

== Early life and education ==
Sinclair was born in Grenoble, the daughter of Canadian academics who were on sabbatical there; she grew up in Calgary. She began her undergraduate studies at McGill University in business, but quickly switched to mathematics, and then earned a master's degree with Len Berggren at Simon Fraser on the history of mathematics and mathematics in medieval Islam.

She became a middle school teacher of mathematics and French on Bowen Island. Sinclair then earned her Ph.D. in 2002 from Queen's University at Kingston, under the joint supervision of Peter Taylor of the Department of Mathematics and Statistics and William Higginson of the Faculty of Education.

== Career ==
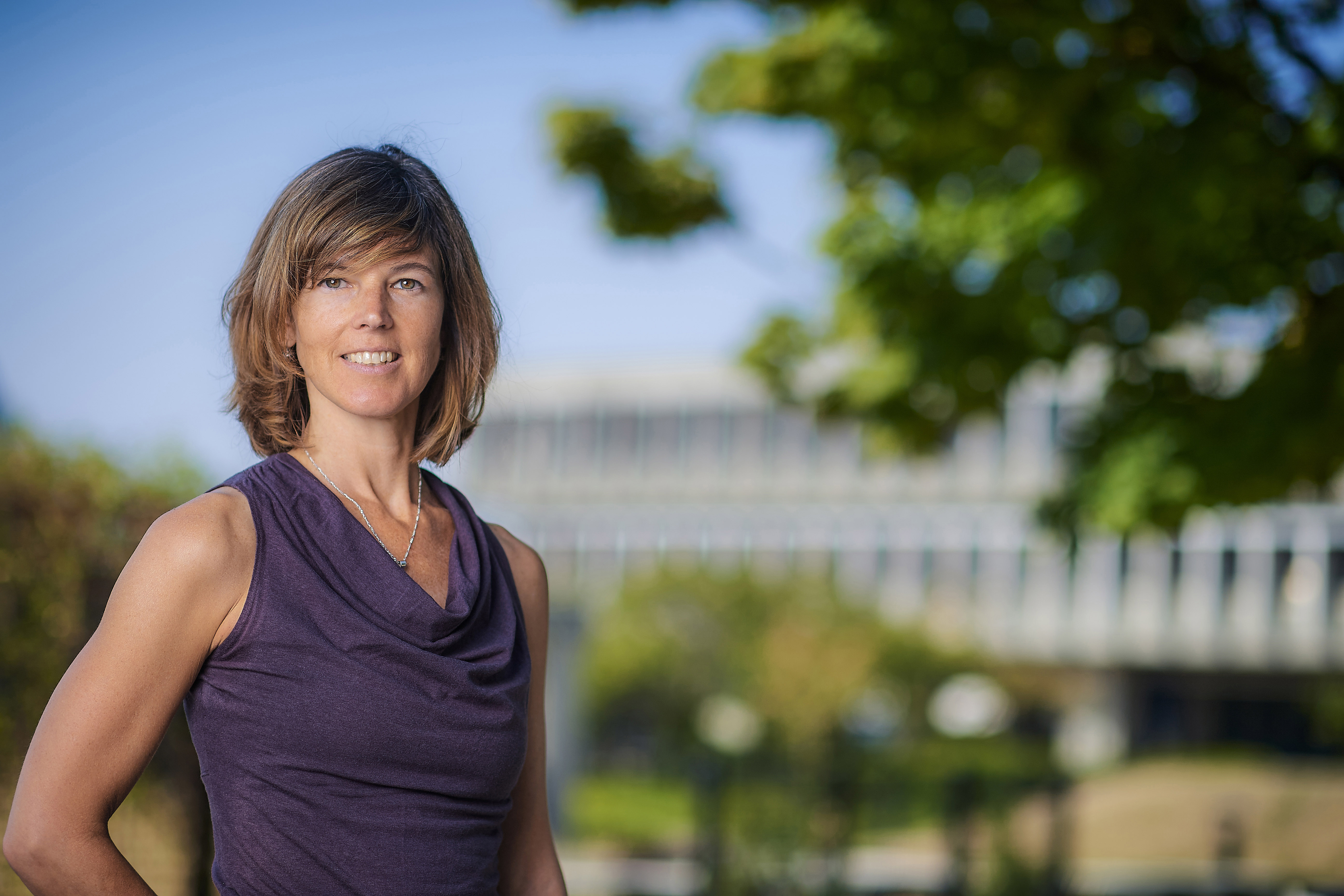
Sinclair in 2017

In 2003, Sinclair accepted a joint appointment in the College of Natural Sciences and the College of Education at Michigan State University.

In 2014, Sinclair and Nicholas Jackiw developed a mathematical app targeted at children ages three to eight. The purpose of the app is to teach children math through "hands-on" learning. Two years later, she was named a Tier 2 Canada Research Chair in Tangible Mathematics Learning.

In March 2017, Sinclair was named Canada's Mathematics Ambassador by Partners in Research for her contributions to the field of mathematics. Later that year, Sinclair was elected a Member of the College of New Scholars, Artists and Scientists of the Royal Society of Canada. In 2019, Sinclair was awarded the Svend Pedersen Lecture Award.

== Selected publications ==
- Sinclair, Nathalie; Yurita, Violeta (September 2008), "To be or to become: how dynamic geometry changes discourse", Research in Mathematics Education, 10 (2): 135–150, doi:10.1080/14794800802233670. Winner of the Janet Duffin Award for the best paper of the year in Research in Mathematics Education.
- de Freitas, Elizabeth; Sinclair, Nathalie (2014), Mathematics and the Body: Material Entanglements in the Classroom, Learning in Doing: Social, Cognitive and Computational Perspectives, Cambridge University Press, ISBN 9781107039483. Honourable Mention for Innovations in Curriculum Studies, American Educational Research Association, 2015.
