= Margaret Greig =

English mathematician

Dorothy Margaret Greig (née Hannah; 11 February 1922 – 10 June 1999) was an English applied mathematician who worked upon the theory of worsted spinning, especially the superdraft system invented by Geoffrey Ambler. During the Second World War, she worked on the analysis of strategic bombing. She began lecturing at Leeds University in 1948 and subsequently lectured at Constantine Technical College and Durham University.

== Early life and education ==
Dorothy Margaret Hannah was born on 11 February 1922. She was known by her second name Margaret. She attended Central Newcastle High School, and was awarded a First Trust Scholarship to attend Newnham College, Cambridge, from 1940 to 1943, where she earned a Master of Arts. She also earned first-class honours and was a Wrangler. She undertook research at the textile department of the University of Leeds, and earned a M. S. followed by a PhD in 1950.

== Career ==
Greig was an applied mathematician who worked upon the theory of worsted spinning, especially the superdraft system invented by Geoffrey Ambler. Her understanding of the theory led to improvements in the tension rollers. During World War 2, she worked in the Air Warfare Analysis Section of the Ministry of Defence, on the analysis of strategic bombing, researching patterns of bomb craters around targets. Greig started lecturing at Leeds University in 1948. She subsequently lectured at Constantine Technical College and Durham University.

Greig collaborated with T. H. Wise to publish the two volumes of Hydrodynamics and Vector Field Theory, in 1962 and 1963. She published a textbook on optimization in 1980.

== Personal life ==
Dorothy Margaret Hannah married W. A. Greig in 1948, taking his surname, and had three sons and a daughter. She “was much admired for the way she combined her family life with a full-time teaching and research position”.
