= Institute For Figuring =

The Institute For Figuring (IFF) was an organization based in Los Angeles, California that promotes the public understanding of the poetic and aesthetic dimensions of science, mathematics and the technical arts. Founded by Margaret Wertheim and Christine Wertheim, the institute hosts public lectures and exhibitions, publishes books and maintains a website.

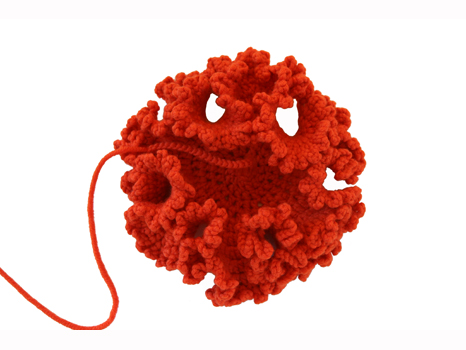
Crocheted hyperbolic pseudosphere from the IFF Collection

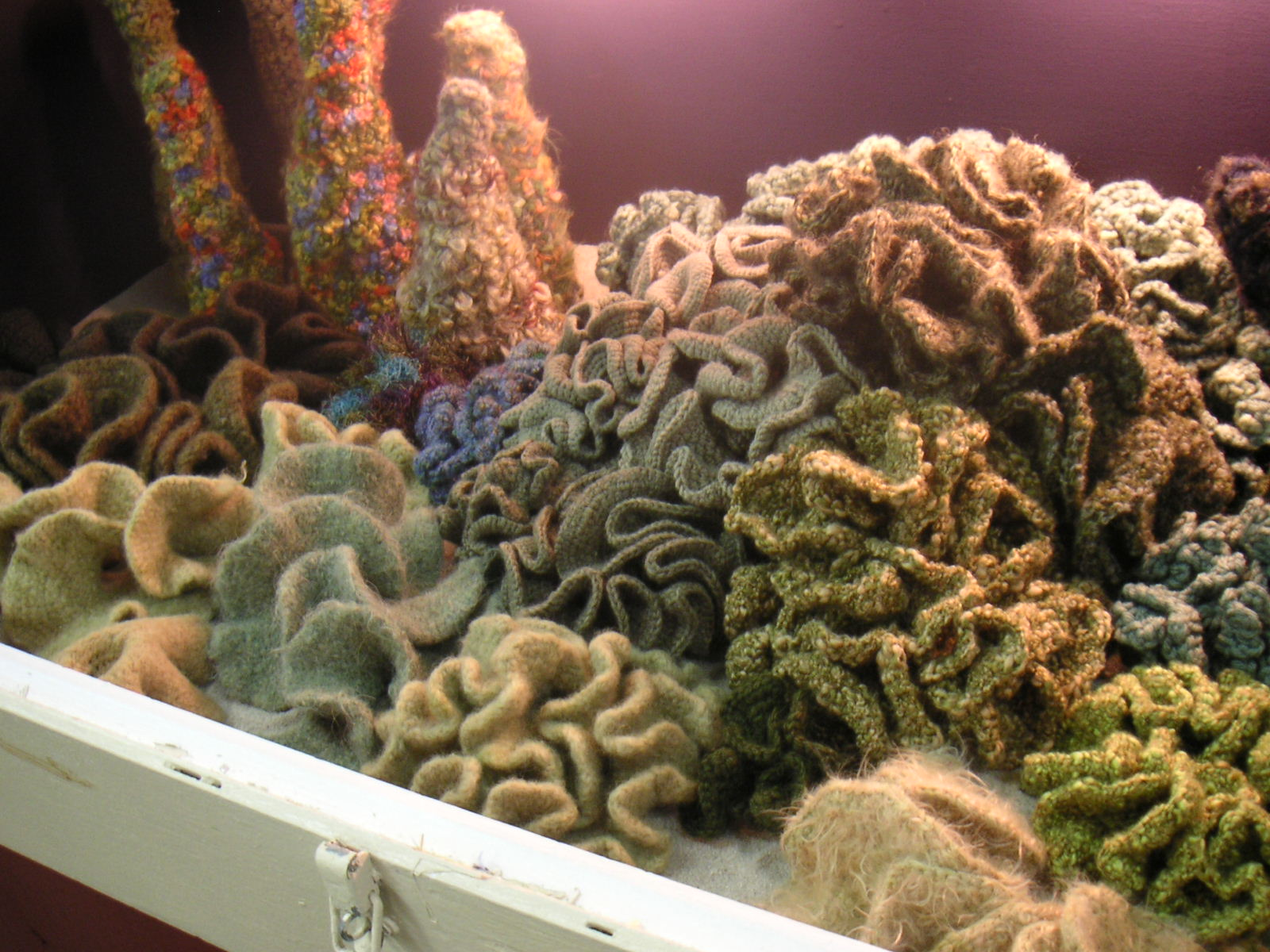
The IFF's collection of crocheted hyperbolic planes, in imitation of a coral reef

IFF hyperbolic crochet cacti and kelp at the LA County Fair, 2006

== Published works ==
- Robert Kaplan The Figure That Stands Behind Figures: Mosaics of the Mind (2004)
- Margaret Wertheim A Field Guide to Hyperbolic Space (2005)
- Margaret Wertheim A Field Guide to the Business Card Menger Sponge (2006)
- Margaret Wertheim, Christine Wertheim Crochet Coral Reef: A Project (2015)

== See also ==
- Mathematics and fiber arts
- European Society for Mathematics and the Arts
