= Sai yut =

Sai yut or Sai yud (Thai: สายหยุด) may refer to:

- Sai yut, the Thai common name of Desmos chinensis, a flower species
- Saiyuud Diwong, Thai chef and author
- Sai Yud BTS station, a train station in Bangkok, Thailand
- "Sai Yut", a song composed by Sirikit, the queen mother of Thailand
