= Greek Rural Postmen and Their Cancellation Numbers =

Book published in 1994

- Front cover of Greek Rural Postmen and Their Cancellation Numbers.
- Author: Derek Willan (editor)
- Language: English
- Subject: Philately
- Publisher: Hellenic Philatelic Society of Great Britain
- Publication date: 1994
- Publication place: United Kingdom
- Pages: 72
- ISBN: 0-9509461-3-3

Greek Rural Postmen and Their Cancellation Numbers is a book edited by Derek Willan and published by the Hellenic Philatelic Society of Great Britain in 1994. The book is a work of postal history that describes the postmarks used by Greek rural postmen in the twentieth century since the rural post service was introduced in 1911.

The book is notable for its title. It won the Bookseller/Diagram Prize for Oddest Title of the Year in 1996; in 2008, the book also won a special "Diagram of Diagrams" prize for having the oddest title of any book over the past 30 years.

== Subject matter ==
Greek Rural Postmen and Their Cancellation Numbers looks at the history of Greek stamps in rural parts of the country and how they came to be cancelled by the Greek Postal Service. It is designed "to encourage the collection of Greek stamps and to promote their study".

== Bookseller/Diagram Prize ==
The most notable achievement of the book is that its title is considered to be one of the oddest of any book ever published. It first won the Bookseller/Diagram Prize for Oddest Title of the Year in 1996, In 2008, a special "Diagram of Diagrams" prize was held in order to mark the 30th anniversary of the creation of the prize. Greek Rural Postmen and Their Cancellation Numbers was one of the candidates, along with all other previous winners. The book managed to win the top prize, earning 13% of the vote from around 1,000 voters. It won the prize despite another book, People Who Don't Know They're Dead, leading the poll for most of the running. It came second with 11% of the vote, with How to Avoid Huge Ships coming third with 10%.

Philip Stone, charts editor at The Bookseller, said that the book won because the subject matter related to current news about post office closures. He said: "The papers are littered with news stories regarding the closure of local, rural post offices across Great Britain, and I sincerely believe that this title provides further proof to the current Government that the British public are passionate about the maintenance and continuation of local mail delivery services. And not just nationally, but internationally".
