= Rienk =

Rienk is a Dutch masculine given name.

Notable people with the name include:

- Rienk Jelgerhuis (1729–1806), a Dutch artist
- Rienk Kuiper (1886–1966), a Dutch-American theologian and college administrator
- Rienk Feenstra (1920–2005), a Dutch philatelist
- Rienk Kan (born 1993), a Dutch athlete and discgolfer
- Rienk Mast (born 2001), a Dutch basketball player
