= Rienk Feenstra =

Dutch philatelist

- Born: 1920
- Died: 2005 (aged 84–85)

Rienk Feenstra (1920–2005) was an international expert in Greek philately, writing and editing key reference books in this area, especially on the stamps and postal history of Crete. He was chairman of the Hellenic Philatelic Society of Netherlands for 6 years and then its Honorary Chairman. He was awarded the Resistance Medal, was a knight of the Order of Orange-Nassau (Orde van Oranje Nassau) and received numerous awards for his philatelic writing.

== See also ==
- Postage stamps and postal history of Crete
- Postage stamps and postal history of Greece
