= Mark Mindler =

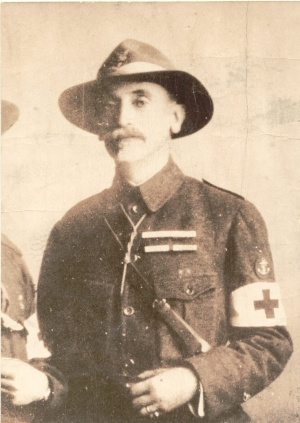
- Markos Mindler

President of the board of the Panhellenic Association of Amateur Athletics
- In office 1914–1926

Mark Joseph Mindler (March 28, 1860 – 1957) was a Greek civil servant and volunteer youth educator, founder of the first Greek Scouting group.

Mark Mindler was born in Athens, Greece, to parents of German descent. He studied law at the University of Athens. In 1882, having acquired his PhD, he was admitted to the Athens Bar Association and started working as a non-salaried assistant judge in the Athens court of first instance, rising to serve as an associate judge in the Court of Appeal. In 1886, he was appointed stenographer in the Parliament of Greece. In 1900 following the departure of his brother he became head of the stenographers’ office, a position he kept until his retirement in 1937, having reached the rank of general director. Mark Mindler died in 1957.

== Background ==
Mindler devoted significant time promoting the education and development of Greece's youth through activities such as sports and scouting. He was a member of the board of the Panhellenic Association of Amateur Athletics (SEGAS) when it was first established and served as its president from 1914 to 1926. When he departed in 1928, he was awarded the title of honorary president. Mark Mindler actively promoted the Scout Movement in Greece, founding and leading the first Greek scouting group.

Mindler was a homo universalis. As a devoted athlete he participated in 1875 in the third Zappas Olympics, the first revival of the Olympic Games. Apart from his involvement in SEGAS and the scouting movement, he was a president of the Neo Faliro Nautical Club, the Panhellenic Gymnastics Association, and the biking club. In addition, as a philatelist he served as a president of the Hellenic Philotelic Society (1929), and as a graduate of the Athens Conservatoire he participated in a number of its concerts.

For his contributions to Greek society, Mindler received numerous awards and distinctions. He was decorated with the Order of King George I, the Order of the Phoenix, the Gold Cross of the Saviour and many other foreign medals. In addition, the municipality of Athens presented him with the Bronze Medal of the City of Athens.

Every year since his death the Scout Group that he founded has laid fresh red and black tulips on his grave during a dedicated memorial service.

== See also ==
- Hellenic Philotelic Society
