= Peek-A-Poo =

2010 book by Guido Van Genechten

Peek-A-Poo: What’s In Your Diaper?
- First edition (Dutch)
- Author: Guido van Genechten
- Original title: Mag Ik Eens In Je Lueir Kijken?
- Language: Dutch
- Genre: Children's book
- Publisher: Clavis Publishing, Bloomsbury
- Publication date: 2009
- English publication date: January 1, 2010
- Media type: Print (Hardcover)
- Pages: 32
- Awards: 2010 Bookseller/Diagram Prize for Oddest Title of the Year Finalist
- ISBN: 978-1605370521
- Dewey Decimal: Dewey Decimal System classification
- LC Class: Library of Congress Classification

Peek-A-Poo: What's In Your Diaper? (originally titled Mag Ik Eens In Je Luier Kijken?) is a 2010 picture book for children pertaining to toilet training, catered to children of ages two to five, written and illustrated by Guido van Genechten and published by Clavis Publishing on January 1, 2010. It was longlisted for the 2010 Bookseller/Diagram Prize for Oddest Title of the Year. Originally penned in Dutch, the book has been adapted into many languages, including English and Afrikaans.

== Synopsis ==
An inquisitive Mouse looks into the diapers of his fellow animal friends, such as Hare, Doggy, Horse, Piggy and Goat, and scrutinizes the different types of faeces and droppings in them. When he finally looks into his own, he realises how clean his is, for he has learnt how to use the potty.

== Major themes ==
=== Toilet training ===
Peek-A-Poo: What’s In Your Diaper? pertains to toilet training. Its main theme is to raise awareness in children about having good toilet training skills.

=== Classification and counting ===
Throughout the book, the main protagonist, Mouse, looks into the soiled diapers of his fellow animal friends. All of them have different type of droppings, some of which are large and black, some of which are small and light. There is also some emphasis in the number of droppings each animal friend has. (For example, Hare has seven hare pellets in his diapers)
