= How to Avoid Huge Ships =

1982 book by John W. Trimmer

- Author: John W. Trimmer
- Language: English
- Subject: Seamanship
- Publisher: First edition: National Writers Press; Second edition: Cornell Maritime Press /Tidewater
- Publication date: First edition: 1982; Second edition: 1993
- Publication place: United States
- Media type: Paperback
- Pages: First edition: 97; Second edition: 112
- ISBN: 978-0881000191 (1st edition); ISBN 978-0870334337 (2nd edition)

How to Avoid Huge Ships is a 1982 book by Captain John W. Trimmer, a Master Mariner and Seattle harbor pilot. The first edition was self-published from Trimmer's home in Seattle, and carried the subtitle Or: I Never Met a Ship I Liked. It is a maritime operations guidance book, but also attracted some attention due to its title, which some found to be unusual, incongruous, and humorous.

Intended for a specialized audience (the captains or operators of small private boats, such as yachts and trawlers), the book gives advice on appropriate avoidance actions when confronted by the near presence of a large ship such as a freighter, along with anecdotes and background information such as the capabilities and operating procedures of the large ships.

== Bookseller/Diagram Prize ==
The book won the 1992 Bookseller/Diagram Prize for Oddest Title of the Year and was used to title the first compilation of prize winners, How to Avoid Huge Ships and Other Implausibly Titled Books (2008). The book finished third in The Bookseller's 2008 competition for the oddest book title of all time (behind Greek Rural Postmen and Their Cancellation Numbers and People Who Don't Know They're Dead: How They Attach Themselves to Unsuspecting Bystanders and What to Do About It).

== In popular culture ==
Beginning in 2000, the book attracted humorous reader reviews on its Amazon.com entry. The book, its prize-winning status, and sometimes its accompanying constellation of odd reviews, was commented on by publications ranging from Cracked to the New York Times. The New York Daily News called it "the best book ever" while Publishers Weekly conversely called it "the worst book ever".

In the video game The Witcher 3: Wild Hunt, there is a book titled "How to Avoid Colossal Vessels", which is regarded as an easter egg reference to this book.

In 2021, the book was featured in several internet memes related to that year's blockage of the Suez Canal.
