= Living with Crazy Buttocks =

2001 book by Kaz Cooke

- Author: Kaz Cooke
- Language: English
- Subject: Contemporary culture
- Publisher: Penguin Books, Harmondsworth
- Publication date: November 19, 2001
- Media type: Print (paperback)
- Pages: 348
- Awards: 2002 Bookseller/Diagram Prize for Oddest Title of the Year
- ISBN: 9780140297232
- Dewey Decimal: Dewey Decimal System classification
- LC Class: Library of Congress Classification

Living with Crazy Buttocks is a book written by Australian author and cartoonist Kaz Cooke and published by Penguin Books on November 19, 2001. It won the 2002 Bookseller/Diagram Prize for Oddest Title of the Year.

== Synopsis ==
Living with Crazy Buttocks is composed of humorous essays on contemporary culture, with author Kaz Cooke exploring topics ranging from Barbie dolls, the National Aeronautics and Space Administration, celebrities, firemen, archbishops, cosmetic surgery, Internet gurus, Ricky Martin's bottom, Barbara Cartland to Ben-Hur.
