= Kaz Cooke =

Australian author, cartoonist and broadcaster

- Born: Karen Cooke; 17 December 1962 (age 63); Melbourne, Victoria, Australia
- Occupations: Author, cartoonist, journalist, broadcaster
- Years active: 1980s–present
- Known for: Advice books for girls and women; satirical columns and cartoons
- Notable work: Real Gorgeous (1994); Up the Duff (1999); Girl Stuff (2007)
- Awards: Bookseller/Diagram Prize (2002); Australian Publishers Association General Non-fiction Book of the Year (2008)

Kaz Cooke (born Karen Cooke; 17 December 1962) is an Australian author, cartoonist and broadcaster. She has written several bestselling advice books for girls and women, including Real Gorgeous, Up the Duff (also published under different titles outside of Australia), Kidwrangling. Girl Stuff and Women's Stuff, as well as a series of ebooks on women's health topics. Cooke has been a columnist for various Australian newspapers and magazines, including Dolly, The Age, The Australian, Who and The Canberra Times. A collection of her columns, Living with Crazy Buttocks, won the 2002 Bookseller/Diagram Prize for Oddest Title of the Year. In 2008, Girl Stuff won the Australian Publishers Association's General Non-fiction Book of the Year, the Australian Booksellers Association Nielsen BookData Booksellers' Choice Award, and an honour prize from the Children’s Book Council of Australia.

== Life ==
Kaz Cooke was born and raised in Melbourne. As a teenager she worked in a second-hand bookstore, where she discovered the satirical Nigel Molesworth novels of Geoffrey Willans, illustrated by cartoonist Ronald Searle, and Searle's St Trinian's School cartoons. According to Cooke, they were her "first, and maybe biggest ever, influences".

In 2010 Cooke accompanied fellow authors Andy Griffiths and Kate Grenville to the remote Northern Territory community of Manyallaluk, 66 kilometres north-east of Katherine, to work with schoolchildren as part of the Indigenous Literacy Project.

=== Journalism ===
Cooke started as a cadet journalist at The Age in 1981, a month after her 18th birthday, and worked as a junior news reporter in the Age's Sydney bureau in the early 1980s. In 1986 she was the editor of the Age's Friday 'Entertainment Guide' section (now known as 'EG'), then in 1987 she was the features editor of the short-lived Business Daily independent magazine.

Articles by Cooke appeared in the 1980s in Dolly, The Australian Women’s Weekly and Cleo. In the late 1980s she began writing an etiquette column for The Age called 'Keep Yourself Nice'. In the 1990s she had a regular column in the Weekend Australian Magazine and a satirical gossip column in Who magazine. In the 2000s she wrote about television for The Canberra Times, and occasional opinion pieces for various other publications.

=== Cartoons ===
Cooke's early cartoons appeared in The Cane Toad Times, The Eye, The National Times and other independent newspapers. In 1984 she created the cartoon character 'Hermoine the modern girl’, who first appeared in The Eye and then in the late 1980s as a weekly feature in the Sunday Age and Sydney Morning Herald. In 1988 Cooke compiled cartoons about Aboriginal people and racism by various cartoonists for Beyond a Joke: An Anti-Bicentenary Cartoon Book (published by McPhee Gribble/Penguin Books).

Of her cartoons, Cooke said in a geekgirl interview in 1996: "I’m learning to get a whole lot better at making stuff happen on computer, but I still really love drawing in old-fashioned pen and a bottle of the blacker-than-black waterproof ink – delicious." In c.1996–97 she wrote a weekly column in the Sydney Morning Herald’s 'Good Weekend’ magazine, whose illustrations she described as "bizarrely incongruous photographic vignettes of famous people such as Queen Elizabeth II and Princess Diana as joke self-portraits", while in 1999 she returned to using her own cartoons to illustrate her weekly column in The Australian. In 1997 she released a calendar printed on "paper" made from sugarcane pulp.

== Works ==
=== Non-fiction books ===
The Modern Girl's Guide to Everything (1986)

Beyond a Joke: An Anti-Bicentenary Cartoon Book (1988)

The Modern Girl’s Guide to Safe Sex (1988; revised edition 1993)

Keep Yourself Nice: Kaz Cooke Answers Your Etiquette Problems (1990)

The Modern Girls Are Strong Diary 1992: With Hermoine the Modern Girl (1991)

Real Gorgeous: The Truth About Body and Beauty (1994)

The Little Book of Stress (1996)

Get a Grip (1996)

Women's Trouble: Natural and Medical Solutions (with Ruth Trickey) (1998; revised edition 2000)

The Little Book of Crap (with Simon Weazelpantz) (1998)

Get Another Grip (1998)

The Little Book of Dumb Feng Shui (1999)

Up the Duff: The Real Guide to Pregnancy (1999; revised edition 2009)

The Little Book of Beauty (2000)

The Little Book of Household Madness (2000)

Living with Crazy Buttocks (2001)

The Little Book of Diet and Exercise (2001)

The Baby Book: A Fun Scrapbook for the First Five Years (2002)

Endometriosis: Natural and Medical Solutions (with Ruth Trickey) (2002)

Menopause: Natural and Medical Solutions (with Ruth Trickey) (2002)

Problem Periods: Natural and Medical Solutions (with Ruth Trickey) (2002)

Kidwrangling: The Real Guide to Caring for Babies, Toddlers and Preschoolers (2003; revised edition 2010)

The Little Book of Excuses (2003)

Girl Stuff: Your Full-on Guide to the Teen Years (2007; second edition 2013)

Women's Stuff (2011)

Girl Stuff for Girls Aged 8–12: Your Real Guide to the Pre-teen Years (2016)

=== Ebooks ===
Breast Health: Everything you Need to Know about Bosoms, Breast Lumps and Beyond (2013)

Escaping Control and Abuse: How to Get Out of a Bad Relationship and Recover from Assault (2013)

Menopause: How Not to Go Bonkers (And What to Do Instead) (2013)

Mind Your Mental Health: Dealing With Moods, Grief, Depression, Anxiety, Eating Disorders and More (2013)

Period Problems and Solutions: How to Get Out of Hormone Hell (2013)

Pregnancy Decisions: Know Your Options (2013)

Sex with the Lot: The Modern Woman's Guide to Her Own Sex Life (2013)

Should You Immunise Your Kids? (2013)

=== Novels ===
The Crocodile Club (1992)

Ada (2017)

=== Children's books ===
The Terrible Underpants (2000)

Wanda-Linda Goes Berserk (2002)

=== Illustrator ===
Sharon O'Keefe, The Best-looking Women in Bondi Junction (1989)

Lola Montez, The Arts of Beauty, or, Secrets of a Lady's Toilet, with Hints to Gentlemen on the Art of Fascinating (1997)

Mirabel Foundation, When the Children Arrive: A Resource Book for Carers (2001)
