= Phahon Yothin 59 BTS station =

Railway station in Bangkok, Thailand

Phahon Yothin 59 พหลโยธิน 59
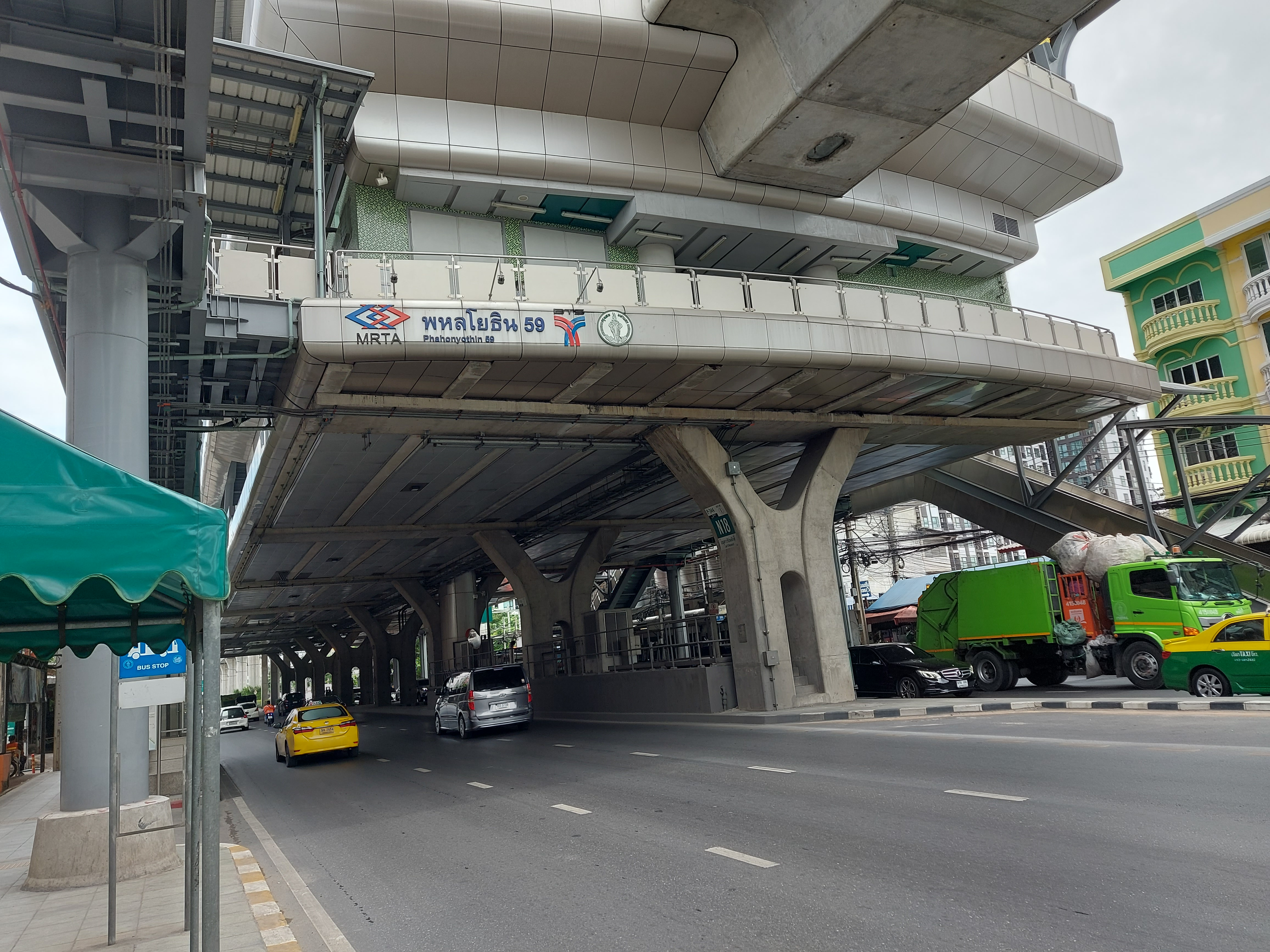

General information
- Location: Bang Khen, Bangkok, Thailand
- Coordinates: 13.8825°N 100.6008°E
- System: BTS
- Owner: Bangkok Metropolitan Administration (BMA)
- Operator: Bangkok Mass Transit System; Public Company Limited (BTSC)
- Line: Sukhumvit Line

Other information
- Station code: N18

History
- Opened: 16 December 2020
- Former names: Laksi Monument

Passengers
- 2021: 560,343

Services
Preceding station	BTS Skytrain	Following station
Sai Yud towards Khu Khot	Sukhumvit Line	Wat Phra Sri Mahathat towards Kheha
Location

Phahon Yothin 59 Station (Thai: สถานีพหลโยธิน 59, RTGS: Sathani Phahon Yothin Ha Sip Kao, pronounced [sā.tʰǎː.nīː pʰā.hǒn jōː.tʰīn hâː sìp kâːw]) is a BTS Skytrain station, on the Sukhumvit Line in Bangkok, Thailand. The station is part of the northern extension of the Sukhumvit Line and opened on 16 December 2020, as part of phase 4.

== See also ==
- Bangkok Skytrain
