= Bookseller/Diagram Prize for Oddest Title of the Year =

Humorous book award

Bookseller/Diagram Prize for Oddest Book Title of the Year
- Awarded for: Oddest book title
- Country: United Kingdom
- First award: 1978
- Currently held by: The Pornographic Delicatessen: Midcentury Montréal's Erotic Art, Media, and Spaces by Matthew Purvis (2025)
- Website: The Diagram Prize

The Bookseller/Diagram Prize for Oddest Title of the Year, originally known as the Diagram Group Prize for the Oddest Title and commonly known as the Diagram Prize, is a humorous literary award that is given annually to a book with an unusual title. The prize is named after the Diagram Group, an information and graphics company based in London, and The Bookseller, a British trade magazine for the publishing industry. Originally organised to provide entertainment during the 1978 Frankfurt Book Fair, the prize has since been awarded every year by The Bookseller and is now organised by the magazine's diarist Horace Bent. The winner was initially decided by a panel of judges. However, since 2000 the winner has been decided by a public vote on The Bookseller's website.

Several controversies have arisen since the creation of the awards, and there have been two occasions when no award was given because no titles were judged to be odd enough. Bent has complained about some of the winners chosen by the public; the 2008 winner, The 2009–2014 World Outlook for 60-milligram Containers of Fromage Frais, proved controversial because rather than being written by its listed author, Philip M. Parker, it was instead written by a machine of Parker's invention. The most recent winner, in November 2025, was The Pornographic Delicatessen: Midcentury Montréal's Erotic Art, Media, and Spaces by Matthew Purvis.

== History ==
Although the award was created by The Bookseller, the idea of an award celebrating books with odd titles was proposed by Bruce Robertson and Trevor Bounford of the Diagram Group in order to provide entertainment during the Frankfurt Book Fair in 1978. Originally known as the Diagram Group Prize for the Oddest Title at the Frankfurt Book Fair, any book that was at the fair could be nominated, but other books outside of the fair were also included. In 1982, Horace Bent, diarist for The Bookseller, took over administrative duties. Following two occasions in 1987 and 1991 when no prize was given due to a lack of odd titles, The Bookseller opened suggestions to the readers of the magazine. In 2000, the winner was voted for by the public instead of being decided by Bent. In 2009, online submissions sent on Twitter were accepted. This resulted in the highest number of submissions for the prize in its history, with 90 books being submitted (50 from Twitter), almost three times the number from the previous year (32). However, Bent also expressed his annoyance at people who gave submissions that broke the rules, with some of the books mentioned being published as far back as 1880. The 2014 prize allowed nominations from self-published works, the first book being Strangers Have the Best Candy by Margaret Meps Schulte, which won the prize.

The Diagram Prize receives considerable press coverage every year. In 2008, more people voted for the Diagram Prize (8,500 votes) than The Best of Booker Prize (7,800). The prize is either a magnum of champagne or a bottle of claret for the person who nominates the winning title, and increased publicity for both the book and its author. In 2014, the nominator was Brian Payne, who works as the deputy chief sub-editor of The Bookseller. Due to his position he decided to reject the bottle of claret that he won, saying it "would remain in the cellar." In 2018, all the nominations came from staff at The Bookseller, so the claret was awarded to a random voter who voted for the eventual winner.

=== Format ===
Nominees were originally limited to just books at the Frankfurt Book Fair, but this was extended to submissions sent in by The Bookseller magazine's traditional readership of librarians, publishers, and booksellers in order to decrease the risk of no award being given. In 2009, submissions could be sent to either Bent's or The Bookseller's Twitter accounts. People cannot nominate their own works, nor can they select books they publish themselves. Titles that are deliberately created to be funny are normally rejected. Also, nominators, judges and voters are actively discouraged from reading any of the nominations, "for fear that becoming too close to the work may cloud their judgement in declaring the text's title 'odd', especially considering the prize champions 'odd titles' and not 'odd books' (see the Man Booker for the latter)". The winner was originally voted for by a panel of judges, but since 2000 the winner has been voted for by members of the public via the Internet. Bent resisted this move and threatened to resign, but he later reconsidered and now creates the short list of finalists. Also, the title of the book must be in English, although the language in the book can be any language.

=== Books about the prize ===
In September 2008, a book about the Diagram Prize was published by Aurum Press entitled How to Avoid Huge Ships and Other Implausibly Titled Books. With an introduction written by Joel Rickett, the book was released to celebrate the 30th anniversary of the prize. It featured a collection of book covers from winners and runners-up from previous years. A follow-up book was released in October 2009, entitled Baboon Metaphysics And More Implausibly Titled Books, including an introduction by Bent.

=== Controversy ===
There have been two occasions on which no award has been presented. Bent did not offer a prize in 1987 and 1991, as he felt there was no title that was odd enough to deserve the prize. The prize has become noteworthy enough that, in 2004, The Bookseller castigated publishers for choosing titles with a view to winning it, saying, "There were too many self-consciously titled entries – presumably in a bid to emulate the 2003 champion, Big Book of Lesbian Horse Stories". Bent has also expressed his dislike of people voting for ruder titles, stating that he himself would not have voted for the 2007 winner If You Want Closure in Your Relationship, Start with Your Legs.

In 2009, the choice of The 2009–2014 World Outlook for 60-milligram Containers of Fromage Frais, by Philip M. Parker, was controversial, as Parker did not write the book himself, but used an automated authoring machine which produces thousands of titles on the basis of Internet and database searches. Philip Stone, charts editor and awards administrator at The Bookseller, commented by saying: "I think it's slightly controversial as it was written by a computer, but given the number of celebrity memoirs out there that are ghostwritten, I don't think it's too strange."

In 2018, one of the nominations, Joy of Waterboiling, was controversial because the book was written mostly in German, but the rules of the prize state that only the title needs to be in English in order to qualify for nomination.

=== Diagram of Diagrams ===
Two special anniversary awards known as the "Diagram of Diagrams" (the name reflects the "Booker of Bookers") have been presented to honour both the 15th and the 30th anniversaries of the Diagram Prize. The nominations of the prizes were all of the previous winners up to that point in time. In 1993, the winner of the 15th anniversary award was Proceedings of the Second International Workshop on Nude Mice, the winner of the first Diagram Prize. The second "Diagram of Diagrams", announced on 5 September 2008, was Greek Rural Postmen and Their Cancellation Numbers, the 1996 winner.

== Winners ==
Year	Title	Author/Editor	Publisher	Notes
1978	Proceedings of the Second International Workshop on Nude Mice	Various authors	University of Tokyo Press	Medical studies done using laboratory mice with inhibited immune systems.
1979	The Madam as Entrepreneur: Career Management in House Prostitution	Barbara Sherman Heyl	Transaction Press	About working in prostitution.
1980	The Joy of Chickens	Dennis Nolan	Prentice Hall	About breeds of chicken.
1981	Last Chance at Love – Terminal Romances	Various authors	Pinnacle Press	
1982	Population and Other Problems: Family Planning, Housing 1,000 Million, Labour Employment	Various authors	China National Publications	About the demographics of the People's Republic of China.
1983	Unsolved Problems of Modern Theory of Lengthwise Rolling	A. I. Tselikov, G. S. Nikitin and S. E. Rokotyan	Mir Publishers	About rolling as a metalworking technique.
1984	The Book of Marmalade: Its Antecedents, Its History, and Its Role in the World Today	Anne Wilson	Constable	About the history of marmalade.
1985	Natural Bust Enlargement with Total Mind Power: How to Use the Other 90% of Your Mind to Increase the Size of Your Breasts	Donald L. Wilson	Westwood Publishing Company	About bust enlargement through positive thinking.
1986	Oral Sadism and the Vegetarian Personality	Glenn C. Ellenbogen	Brunner/Mazel	Humorous and parody articles about psychiatry.
1987	No award given			
1988	Versailles: The View from Sweden	Elaine Dee and Guy Walton	University of Chicago Press	Catalogue of an exhibition at the Cooper–Hewitt Museum on the influence of French Baroque and Classicism on design in contemporary Sweden.
1989	How to Shit in the Woods: An Environmentally Sound Approach to a Lost Art	Kathleen Meyer	Ten Speed Press	About responsible treatment of one's excreta in wilderness areas.
1990	Lesbian Sadomasochism Safety Manual	Patrick Califia (as Pat Califia)	Lace Publications	A guide to BDSM and safe sex between women.
1991	No award given			
1992	How to Avoid Huge Ships	John W. Trimmer	Cornwell Maritime Press	Advice to pleasure boat sailors on the dangers of shipping lanes.
1993	American Bottom Archaeology	Charles J. Bareis and James W. Porter	University of Illinois Press	Full title American Bottom Archaeology: A Summary of the FAI-270 Project Contribution to the Culture History of the Mississippi River Valley.
1994	Highlights in the History of Concrete	C. C. Stanley	British Cement Association	About the history of concrete.
1995	Reusing Old Graves: A Report on Popular British Attitudes	Douglas Davies and Alastair Shaw	Shaw & Son	About reusing old graves.
1996	Greek Rural Postmen and Their Cancellation Numbers	Derek Willan	Hellenic Philatelic Society of Great Britain	Cancellation numbers in the Hellenic Post.
1997	The Joy of Sex: Pocket Edition	Alex Comfort	Mitchell Beazley	Pocket edition of bestselling sex manual The Joy of Sex.
1998	Developments in Dairy Cow Breeding: New Opportunities to Widen the Use of Straw	Gareth Williams	Nuffield Farming Scholarship Trust	
1999	Weeds in a Changing World: British Crop Protection Council Symposium Proceedings No. 64	Charles H. Stirton	British Crop Protection Council	Another title, Male Genitalia of Butterflies of the Balkan Peninsula, with a Checklist, was originally a favourite, but it was later rejected for being deliberately odd.
2000	Designing High Performance Stiffened Structures	Institution of Mechanical Engineers	Professional Engineering Publishing	About stiffness in engineering.
2001	Butterworths Corporate Manslaughter Service	Gerard Forlin	Butterworths	About corporate manslaughter, i.e. corporate liability for manslaughter.
2002	Living with Crazy Buttocks	Kaz Cooke	Penguin US/Australia	Humorous essays on contemporary culture, including female body image and other topics.
2003	The Big Book of Lesbian Horse Stories	Alisa Surkis and Monica Nolan	Kensington Publishing	Eight stories in a pastiche of dime novel styles from different decades, each involving lesbian romance and horses.
2004	Bombproof Your Horse	Rick Pelicano and Lauren Tjaden	J A Allen	Horse training guide, full title Bombproof Your Horse: Teach Your Horse to Be Confident, Obedient, and Safe, No Matter What You Encounter.
2005	People Who Don't Know They're Dead: How They Attach Themselves to Unsuspecting Bystanders and What to Do About It	Gary Leon Hill	Red Wheel/Weiser Books	About dead spirits who take up residence in bodies that do not belong to them.
2006	The Stray Shopping Carts of Eastern North America: A Guide to Field Identification	Julian Montague	Harry N. Abrams	About how to identify abandoned shopping carts.
2007	If You Want Closure in Your Relationship, Start with Your Legs	Big Boom	Simon & Schuster US	A self-help book written by a man, ostensibly for the benefit of women.
2008	The 2009–2014 World Outlook for 60-milligram Containers of Fromage Frais	Philip M. Parker	Icon Group International	Computer-generated combination of boilerplate text and public-domain data related to fromage frais, a type of cheese.
2009	Crocheting Adventures with Hyperbolic Planes	Daina Taimina	A K Peters, Ltd.	Mathematical book featuring crocheted hyperbolic planes.
2010	Managing a Dental Practice: The Genghis Khan Way	Michael R. Young	Radcliffe	How-to guide on managing a dental practice.
2011	Cooking with Poo	Saiyuud Diwong	Urban Neighbours of Hope	Thai cookbook. "Poo" ("ปู") is Saiyuud Diwong's nickname.
2012	Goblinproofing One's Chicken Coop	Reginald Bakeley	Conari Press	Guide to banishing fairies from homes and gardens.
2013	How to Poo on a Date	Mats & Enzo	Prion Press	Subtitled "The Lovers' Guide to Toilet Etiquette".
2014	Strangers Have the Best Candy	Margaret Meps Schulte	Choose Art	Self-published travelogue.
2015	Too Naked For the Nazis	Alan Stafford	Fantom Films	Biography of Wilson, Keppel and Betty, a British music hall and vaudeville troupe.
2016	The Commuter Pig Keeper: A Comprehensive Guide to Keeping Pigs when Time is your Most Precious Commodity	Michaela Giles	Old Pond Publishing	Practical guide to looking after a small herd of pigs.
2017	No award given			
2018	The Joy of Waterboiling	Thomas Götz von Aust	Achse Verlag	First non-English language book to win the prize (published in German with an English title).
2019	The Dirt Hole and its Variations	Charles L Dobbins	Self-published	First posthumous author to win the prize.
2020	A Dog Pissing at the Edge of a Path: Animal Metaphors in an Eastern Indonesian Society	Gregory Forth	McGill-Queen's University Press	An ethnographic study of the Nage people, based on over 30 years of anthropological field research. First Canadian author to win the prize.
2021	Is Superman Circumcised?	Roy Schwartz	McFarland & Company	A study of the Jewish origins of Superman. The author responded to his win, saying, "The competition was stiff, but I'm glad I was able to rise to the challenge."
2022	RuPedagogies of Realness: Essays on Teaching and Learning With RuPaul's Drag Race	Lindsay Bryde and Tommy Mayberry	McFarland & Company	An academic work based on RuPaul's Drag Race.
2023	Danger Sound Klaxon! The Horn That Changed History	Matthew F Jordan	University of Virginia Press	A history of the klaxon horn.
2024	The Philosopher Fish: Sturgeon, Caviar, and the Geography of Desire	Richard Adams Carey	Brandeis University Press	Updated edition of book originally published in 2005 about sturgeon and rise of the caviar industry.
2025	The Pornographic Delicatessen: Midcentury Montréal's Erotic Art, Media, and Spaces	Matthew Purvis	Concordia University Press	A history of the post-Second World War Montreal art scene. Winner with the lowest voter share and by the narrowest margin.

== See also ==
- Bulwer-Lytton Fiction Contest, for the worst opening line of a (fictitious) book
- Lyttle Lytton Contest, a derivative favouring extremely short first sentences

== Bibliography ==
- Bent, Horace (2009). Baboon Metaphysics and More Implausibly Titled Books. London: Aurum Press. ISBN 978-1-84513-498-3
- Rickett, Joel (2008). How to Avoid Huge Ships and Other Implausibly Titled Books. London: Aurum Press. ISBN 978-1-84513-321-4
