= Postage stamps and postal history of Northern Epirus =

The postal history of Northern Epirus, a region in the western Balkans, in southern modern Albania, comprises two periods; 1912–1916 and 1940–41. Northern Epirus was under Greek administration during the First Balkan War (1912–1913), but it was then awarded to the newly founded Albanian state by the Florence Protocol (1913). During this period, Greek stamps were used. Greece withdrew from the region in early 1914. The people of Epirus were unwilling to be part of Albania, though, and launched a revolution. Under a provisional government, the independent Northern Epirus was formed in February 1914 and it eventually managed to gain full autonomy under nominal Albanian sovereignty, according to the Protocol of Corfu (May 1914). Northern Epirus operated its own postal service and issued postage stamps, both official and unofficial, during that year.

Greek armies returned to occupy Epirus in November 1914, after the outbreak of World War I, but were driven out by Italian forces in 1916. During this time Greek stamps overprinted with B. ΗΠΕΙΡΟΣ (N. Epirus) were used. After the war, the region was confirmed as part of Albania.

Epirus briefly came under Greek control again in 1940, after Italy launched an invasion of Greece from Albania. A successful Greek counter-attack occupied much of southern Albania, including Epirus. This lasted until 1941, when Germany invaded and conquered Greece. As earlier, overprinted Greek stamps were used in Epirus during the period of Greek control.

== Greek Occupation 1912–1914 ==
The first stamps used in Epirus, following its occupation by Greece in 1912, were Greek stamps overprinted with ΕΛΛΗΝΙΚΗ ΔΙΟΙΚΗΣΙΣ (Hellenic Administration); these were succeeded in 1913 by newly issued Greek stamps, the so-called "Campaign issue". Both were meant only for use in the newly occupied areas, or "New Territories".

Following Greece's 1914 withdrawal and the founding of the Autonomous Republic of Northern Epirus, a number of stamps were released in the region. They included official definitive stamps, stamps for local use and unofficial issues.

== Epirus definitive issues ==
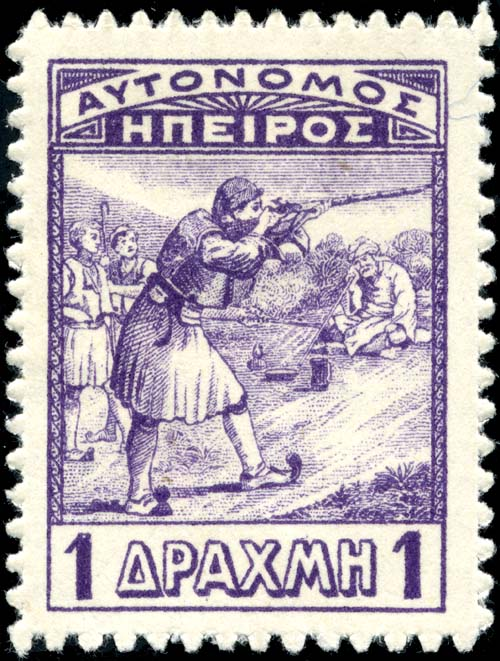
1 drachma value of the 1914 Infantryman issue

The provisional government's first definitive stamps came out in February, March and April 1914. The set of eight stamps, with denominations of 1 lepton, 5, 10, 25 and 50 lepta, 1 drachma and 2 and 5 drachmae, depicted an infantryman aiming a rifle while others look on; the 10 lepta and 25 lepta values were inscribed only with ΗΠΕΙΡΟΣ (these were released in February), while the others read ΑΥΤΟΝΟΜΟΣ ΗΠΕΙΡΟΣ (these were released in March with the exception of the 5 drachma, which came out in April). The set was printed by the firm Gerasimos Aspiotis Bros. of Corfu, which was also responsible for printing many Greek stamps. Instead of regular perforation a serrate roulette was used. Serrate roulettes superficially resemble perforation, but are distinguished by angled cuts rather than round holes.

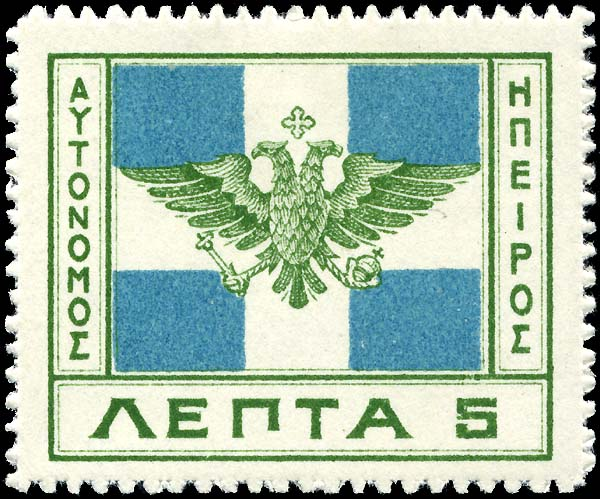
5 lepta value of the 1914 Flag issue

On August 28, the government issued a new set of eight, with the same denominations as previously, depicting the flag of Epirus and a double-headed eagle in a two-color design. Like the previous set, it was printed by Aspiotis Bros. The 25 and 50 lepta values from this set were modified at Koritsa to include the overprint ΚΟΡΥΤΣΑ in dark blue.

A third definitive set came out on October 10, 1914. Produced by the "Papachrysanthou" printing house of Athens, it was issued at Chimarra and depicted King Constantine I of Greece with the inscription ΕΛΛΗΝΙΚΗ ΧΕΙΜΑΡΡΑ (Greek Chimarra). It consisted of ten denominations; the same eight as the previous sets, with the addition of 2 and 20 lepta stamps. Some sheets from this set bore the watermark PARCHEMINE JOHANNOT de Montgolfier, Luquet & Cie., Angoulème at the top or bottom; stamps with part of this watermark are priced much higher than stamps without it.

== Local and unofficial issues ==
The first stamps of independent Epirus were issued in Chimarra in February 1914. The set of four (1 lepton and 5, 10, and 25 lepta) was imperforate, featuring a double-headed eagle along with a skull and crossbones, and inscribed ΕΛΛ. ΑΥΤΟΝ. ΗΠΕΙΡΟΣ - ΕΛΕΥΘΕΡΙΑ Η ΘΑΝΑΤΟΣ - ΑΜΥΝΕΣΘΑΙ ΠΕΡΙ ΠΑΤΡΗΣ (Greek Autonomous Epirus - Freedom or Death - Defend our Country). Produced manually with a handstamp, they also bore a control mark in the lower right corner consisting of a blue oval with the letters "ΣΠ" inside, after Spyros Spyromilios, the commander at Chimarra. Though this set was intended for local use, specimens are known with cancellations for Delvinon (ΔΕΛΒΙΝΟΝ) and Agioi Saranta (ΑΓΙΟΙ ΣΑΡΑΝΤΑ). Some experts argue that it does not qualify as an official stamp issue.

Stamps for local use were also issued in Argyrokastro, by overprinting Turkish stamps with ΑΥΤΟΝΟΜΟΣ ΗΠΕΙΡΟΣ and new values in Greek currency. The overprints were applied vertically in black or red, reading either up or down. This issue was withdrawn from sale on March 6, 1914.

On August 28, in Chimarra, stocks of Greek stamps from 1911 and 1913 were overprinted with ΕΛΛΗΝΙΚΗ 1914 ΧΕΙΜΑΡΡΑ (Greek Chimarra 1914). This set exists both with and without the letters "ΣΣ" (for S. Spyromilios) in manuscript. Counterfeits of both this and the first Chimarra set from February are plentiful.

Four unofficial issues were also produced in 1914; one consisting of overprinted Albanian stamps (six values), the other three bearing new designs of varied quality. These three were produced for Erseka (seven values), Koritsa (three values) and Moscopole (fifteen values). They were likely issued for publicity and propaganda purposes; their regular postal use is questionable, though cancelled specimens of the Erseka and Moscopole issues and examples of these stamps on covers exist. An additional design dates from 1920, long after Epirus' postal system had ceased to exist.

== Later Greek Occupations ==
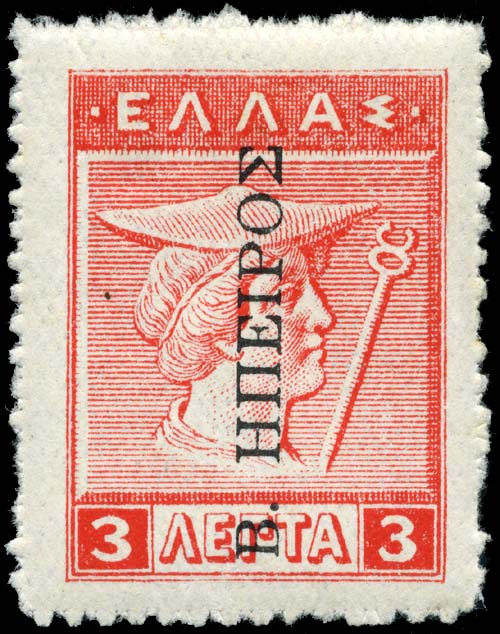
Occupation overprint on 3 lepta stamp of Greece

Greece resumed control over Epirus in November 1914; on the 30th, to meet the area's postal needs, stamps from its "Campaign issue" were issued with the overprint B. ΗΠΕΙΡΟΣ horizontally in black; red overprints were also made, but not issued. (Some cancelled copies are known to exist.) These replaced Epirus' definitive issues. In December 1915 the same overprint was applied vertically, reading either up or down, to Greek definitive stamps of 1911 and 1913 issues. All of these have been counterfeited.

Greek forces were driven out of Epirus by Italy in 1916; at the same time, Koritsa came under French occupation. Under French administration, a short-lived Republic of Korçë was formed there and stamps were issued in December 1916. They were produced by further overprints of a double-headed eagle and new values in centimes on Greek stamps with the B. ΗΠΕΙΡΟΣ overprint.

In October 1940, Italy launched an invasion of Greece from Albania. A Greek counter-attack succeeded in occupying much of southern Albania, including Epirus. During this period of Greek control, which lasted until the German invasion of April 1941, the overprint ΕΛΛΗΝΙΚΗ ΔΙΟΙΚΗΣΙΣ (Hellenic Administration) in black or carmine was applied to Greek definitive issues, airmail stamps, postage due stamps and charity stamps. The overprinted issues were withdrawn from sale in June 1941.

== See also ==
- Postage stamps and postal history of Greece
- Autonomous Republic of Northern Epirus
- Northern Epirus

== References and sources ==
Notes

Sources

- Cronin, Andrew (1977). The Stamps of Moschopolis of 1914. Philotelia.
- Hellas stamp catalogue. Vol. 2 (2008 ed.). A. Karamitsos. ISBN 978-960-88964-5-1.
- Phipps, John S. (1996). Stamps and Posts of Albania and Epirus, 1878-1945. Wholesaler Uniques. ISBN 0-9527177-2-7.
- Rossiter, Stuart; Flower, John (1986). The Stamp Atlas. Facts on File Publications. ISBN 0-8160-1346-2.
- Scott catalogue. Vol. 2 (2001 ed.). Scott Publishing. 2000. ISBN 0-89487-261-3.
