= Saiyuud Diwong =

Thai chef and author

- Born: Thailand
- Children: 2
- Culinary career
- Cooking style: Thai cuisine
- Award won: Bookseller/Diagram Prize for Oddest Title of the Year
- Website: www.cookingwithpoo.com

Saiyuud "Poo" Diwong (Thai: สายหยุด ดีวงษ์) is a Thai chef and author from Khlong Toei. She spent a period selling food from her doorstep before government policy made this unprofitable, at which point she opened the school "Cooking with Poo", a school teaching simple dishes for foreigners. Her 2011 cookbook Cooking with Poo brought her international attention and won the Bookseller/Diagram Prize for Oddest Title of the Year. She subsequently cooked with Jamie Oliver.

== Life and career ==
Diwong grew up on the Chao Phraya River, as her parents sold sand, and moved to her grandmother's house in Khlong Toei aged six to attend school. She left the school at 14, and held a post at a garment factory for seven years before leaving to help at her husband's relative's cook-to-order shop. Her husband, with whom she has two sons, was a motorcycle taxi driver. Her unusual nickname is a shortened version of Chompoo, the Thai word for rose apple, though it is also the Thai word for crab. Initially, she sold food from her doorstep, making about 200 baht over a 12-hour shift; however, following the Yingluck government rice-pledging scheme, rice prices doubled overnight, meaning Diwong could no longer make a profit.

"The "very quick, very easy" dishes that Poo teaches tend towards the street-food end of the culinary spectrum. Options include coconut chicken soup, green papaya salad and minced duck with lemon grass. Our mission today consists of three Thai staples: spicy beef salad, pad thai noodles with prawns, and green chicken curry."

— Gary Jones of South China Morning Post in April 2015

At the behest of her neighbour, Anji Barker, she attended English classes and opened a school teaching foreigners Thai cuisine, "Cooking with Poo"; Barker's charity, Urban Neighbours of Hope (UNOH), funded its setup costs, which Diwong later repaid by funding the UNOH project Helping Hands. Her classes involve a market tour and then a cookery lesson. Gary Jones of South China Morning Post wrote in April 2015 that the school took place in a single room of "perhaps 250 sq ft" with lime green walls decorated with photos and posters of Thai cuisine, "creating an atmosphere that's more cash-strapped kindergarten than international school of learning".

Diwong launched her 112-page cookbook Cooking with Poo in the middle of 2011 at the Foreign Correspondents' Club of Thailand and promoted it during a tour of eastern Australia in June and July. Her book comprised simple Thai dishes optimised for foreign palates. In March 2012, it won the Bookseller/Diagram Prize for Oddest Title of the Year, beating six other entries including Mr Andoh's Pennine Diary: Memoirs of a Japanese Chicken Sexer in 1935 Hebden Bridge and The Great Singapore Penis Panic and the Future of American Mass Hysteria. The usual prize awarded to the discoverer, "a bottle of 'fairly passable plonk'", was not awarded due to the book being discovered via Twitter; the organisers instead made a donation to UNOH.

The book brought her international attention in 2012, prompting Stephen Fry and Jamie Oliver to make social media posts about the book and The Guardian to run an article about it. She subsequently made appearances on talk shows and on Oliver's FoodTube channel; following the latter, British tabloids headlined articles with "Jamie cooks with Poo". She also appeared on a live interview with the BBC on 5 April. By 15 April, the book had sold 6,000 copies; Jim Pollard of The Nation wrote that month that the book "owes its success to lots of good ingredients – it's a quality product, full of nice colour photos and beautifully laid out" and also credited its success to "clever promotional work", its price, and its title. The BBC reported in August that Diwong was earning "about $800 (£505) per month, enough to employ a few local staff to help with the cookery classes and to send her two sons to a good school". Many foreigners visited the school because of its title, prompting Diwong to order aprons with "I cooked with poo and I liked it" written on them.
