= Sai Yud BTS station =

Rapid transit station in Bangkok

Sai Yud สายหยุด
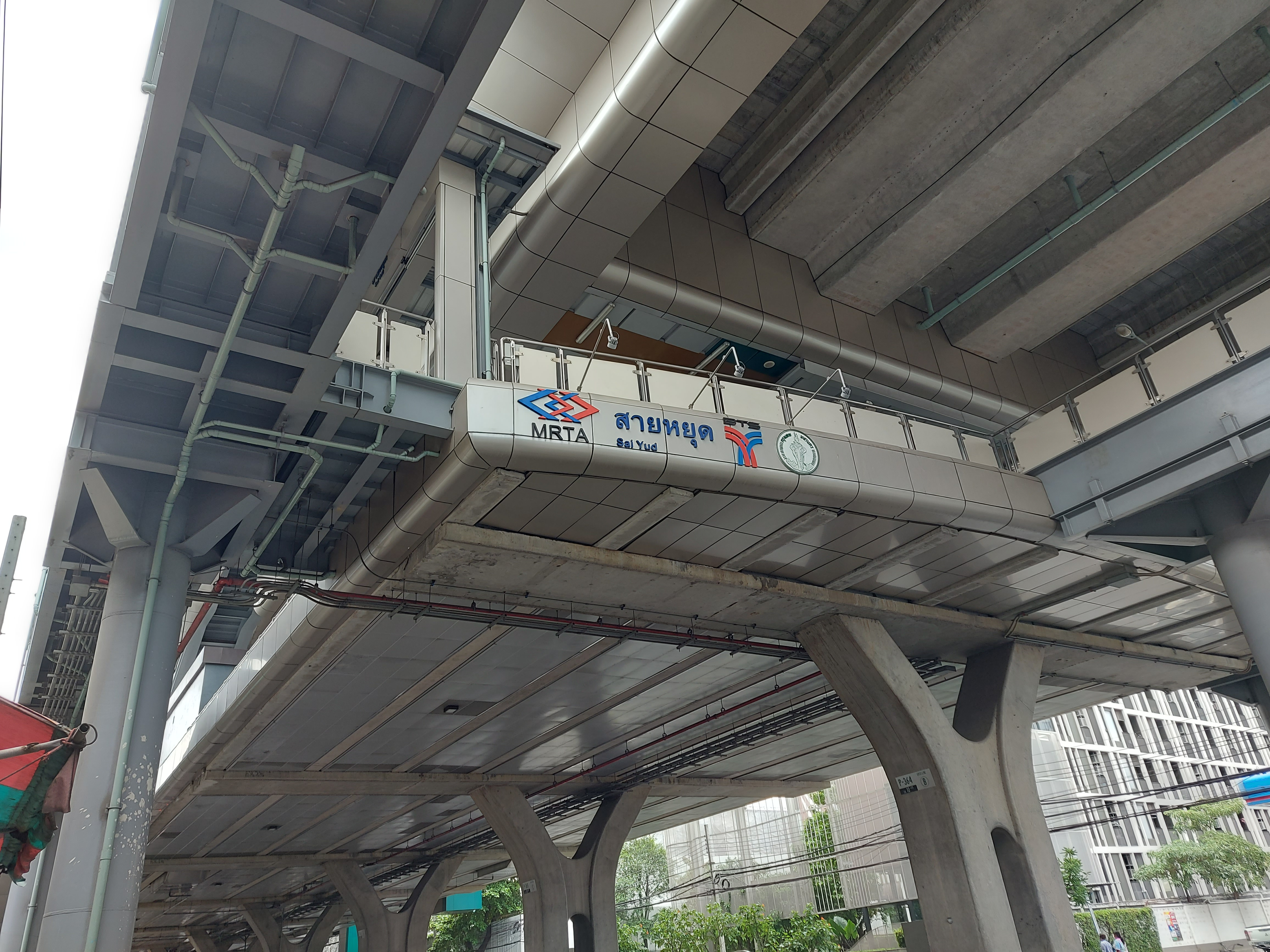

General information
- Location: Bang Khen, Bangkok, Thailand
- Coordinates: 13.8885°N 100.6043°E
- System: BTS
- Owner: Bangkok Metropolitan Administration (BMA)
- Operator: Bangkok Mass Transit System; Public Company Limited (BTSC)
- Line: Sukhumvit Line

Other information
- Station code: N19

History
- Opened: 16 December 2020

Passengers
- 2021: 1,197,118

Services
Preceding station	BTS Skytrain	Following station
Saphan Mai towards Khu Khot	Sukhumvit Line	Phahonyothin 59 towards Kheha
Location

Sai Yud Station (Thai: สถานีสายหยุด, pronounced [sā.tʰǎː.nīː sǎːj.jùt]) is a BTS Skytrain station, on the Sukhumvit Line in Bangkok, Thailand. The station is part of the northern extension of the Sukhumvit Line and opened on 16 December 2020, as part of phase 4.

== Gallery ==
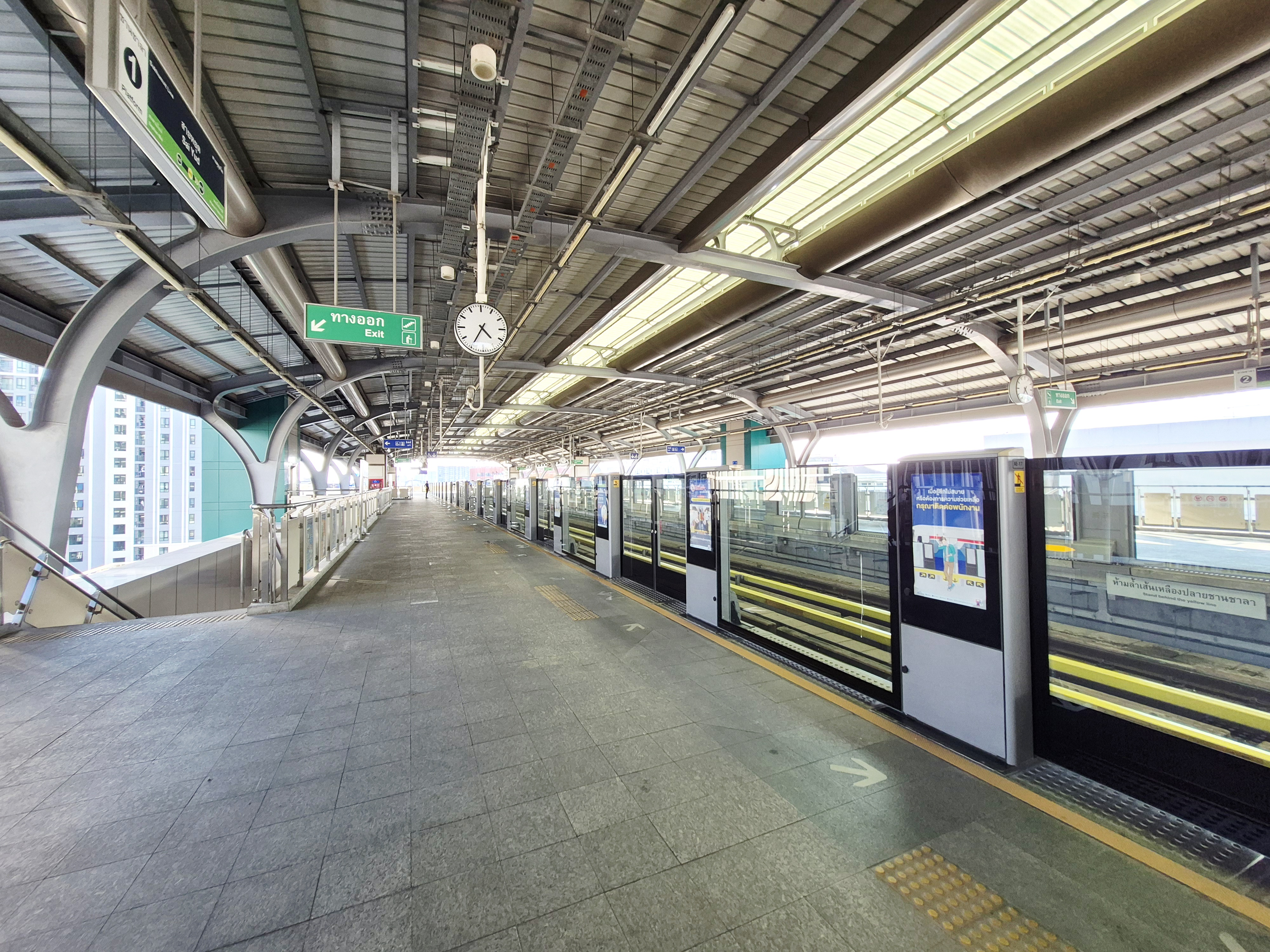
Platform of Sai Yud Station, 2026.

== See also ==
- Bangkok Skytrain
