= Hellenic Philotelic Society =

Philatelic organisation in Athens

- Ελληνική Φιλοτελική Εταιρεία
- The ΕΦΕ's logo
- Abbreviation: ΕΦΕ
- Formation: 1925; 101 years ago
- Type: Not-for-profit organization
- Purpose: To promote philately in Greece and abroad.
- Headquarters: Akadimias 57, Athens, 10679, Greece
- Field: Philately
- Official language: Greek
- Website: https://hps.gr

The Hellenic Philotelic Society (formed 1925) is a philatelic organisation in Athens devoted to promoting the philately of Greece and the Greek area.

The society played an important part in the development of philately in Greece. Members of the society wrote the entries on "stamp" and "philately" in the Great Hellenic Encyclopaedia, the Encyclopaedic Lexikon and the Elios Encyclopaedia. The society also established in the Greek language foreign philatelic terms, including philately, watermark, tete-beche and others. The society organised some of the first national and international philatelic exhibitions in Greece and worked with state institutions to establish stamp issuing and destruction policies to protect the reputation of Greek stamps.

== Awards ==
In 1975, the society received the Athens Award from the Athens Academy on the occasion of the society's fiftieth anniversary. Since then the society has received several other awards including the Certificate of Appreciation from the Federation of European Philatelic Associations (FEPA), and the AEP Philatelic Press Award from the European Philatelic Academy.

The society gives two awards of its own, the Stephanos Macrymichalos Award and the Hellenic Philotelic Society Medal.

== Journal ==
A journal, Philotelia, has been published without interruption since 1924. Philotelia has won and continues to win medals at philatelic exhibitions. It is also available on CD.

== Selected publications ==
The society's most important publications are its Study of the Greek stamp published in Greek and French:

- Vol. I Study on the Greek Stamp. 1933. (Reprinted 2008)
- Vol. II Study on the Greek Stamp. 1937.

The Philatelic Library series consists of a series of numbered booklets, now exceeding sixty, which are reprints of articles or complete studies previously published in Philotelia. Recent examples include:

- No. 58 Chazapis, C. Partisan stamps. Athens, 2008. (Greek) ISBN 978-960-98274-4-7
- No. 59 Kiddle, F. Perkins Bacon & Co. The printing and story of the 1906 Olympic stamps of Greece. Athens, 2008. (Greek - English) ISBN 978-960-98274-5-4
- No. 60 Aggelomatis-Tsougarakis, H. The transmission of correspondence in Eastern Mediterranean (14th-19th c.) Athens, 2008. (Greek) ISBN 978-960-98274-6-1

== See also ==
- Postage stamps and postal history of Crete
- Postage stamps and postal history of Greece
