= Postage stamps and postal history of Crete =

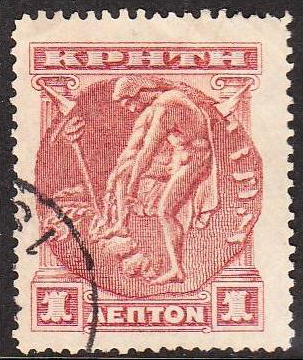
A 1900 stamp of Crete depicting Hermes

This is a survey of the postage stamps and postal history of Crete.

== Ottoman stamps ==
Ottoman stamps were used in Crete until 1898 and franked Letters are known since 1871.

== First stamps and first post offices of the independent postal service ==
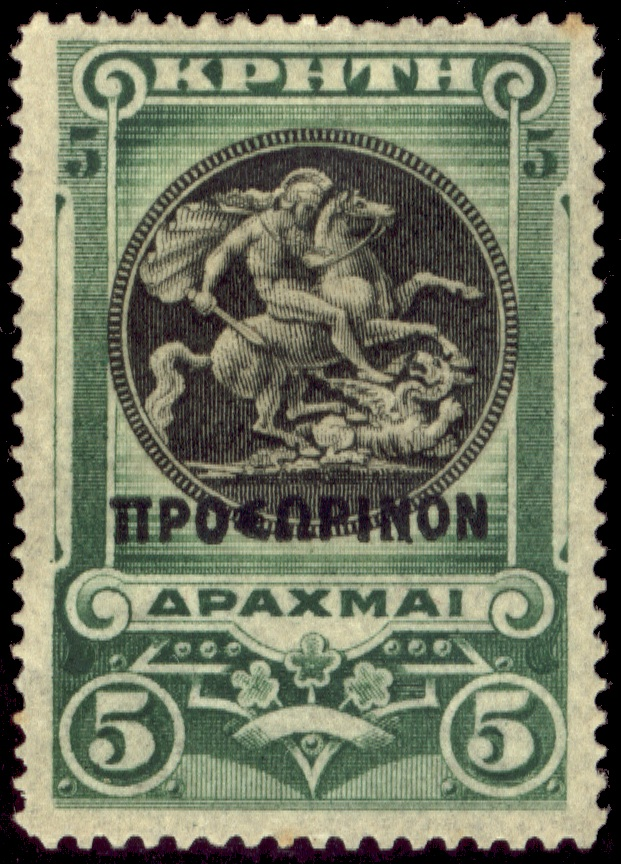
A 1900 stamp

In 1898 Crete obtained autonomy under Ottoman suzerainty, and was garrisoned by an international military force from Britain, France, Italy and Russia, who had intervened against Ottoman control to grant autonomy to the island,

The first stamps of the independent postal service in Crete were issued on 1 March 1900 (Julian calendar). The first series of nine stamps featured images of Hermes, Hera, King Minos, Talos and a portrait of Prince George, who was the high commissioner of the island. The values are 1 lepton, 5 lepta, 10 lepta, 20 lepta in red colour, 25 lepta, 50 lepta in lilac colour, 1 drachma, 2 drachma and 5 drachma. The lower values up to 20 lepta have no overprint. The values from 25 lepta to 5 drachma have a red overprint or a black overprint with the word ΠΡΟΣΩΡΙΝΟΝ in small letters or no overprint. First day cancels exist only on the lower values and the higher values with red overprint. The first cancel on a stamp with black overprint is "XANIA 3 MAPT 1900" on a 2 drachma stamp.

The higher values without overprint were at first used only as revenue stamps. Some of these "revenues" were cancelled (without permission) in post offices. The first cancel on a stamp without overprint and no sign of a revenue might be "XANIA NOEM 1900" on a 5 drachma stamp.

First day cancels are known from the main post offices in Chania (ΧΑΝΙΑ), Rethymnon (ΡΕΘΥΜΝΟΝ) and Heraklion (ΗΡΑΚΛΕΙΟΝ) and from the port of Sitia (ΛΙΜΗΝ ΣΗΤΕΙΑΣ). There should have been 20 other post offices at that time, but for some of them there is no proof that they opened before 1901. One in Kalochorion was closed in May 1900, so that fewer than five items cancelled with this postmark are known. The offices in Georgioupolis and Vokoulies were closed in spring 1901. Fewer than ten items cancelled with the Georgioupolis postmark are known; the Vokoulies cancels are seldom seen but not rare and forgeries exist.

In July 1900 the 20 lepta stamp in orange colour and the 50 lepta in ultramarine colour were ordered, both without overprint. One 50 lepta is cancelled "ΗΡΑΚΛΕΙΟΝ" in "ΑΥΓ 1900", although Greek stamp catalogues list the issue of both stamps in January 1901.

In December 1901 the 25 lepta with a black overprint "ΠΡΟΣΩΡΙΝΟΝ" in large letters was issued.

The 20 lepta orange overprinted with two black 5 in the lower corners was issued circa November 1904. The first known cancel on this stamp is "18 NOEM 1904".

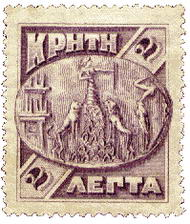
The 1905 series

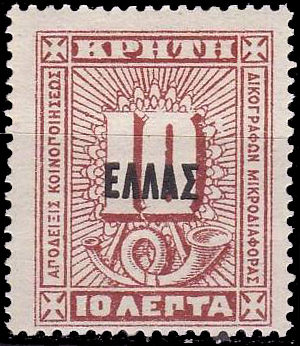
A stamp overprinted "ΕΛΛΑΣ" in 1908

== Later issues ==
In February 1905, the second series was released. The series depicted Artemis, Britomartis, infant Cydon suckling a female Cretan hound, Triton, Ariadne, as well as the ruins of the Palace of Knossos and the Arcadia Monastery against the backdrop of Mount Ida.

In September 1908, after the Cretan deputies unilaterally declared union with Greece, the stamps of the previous issues were overprinted "ΕΛΛΑΣ" ("Greece").

== Foreign post offices ==
At the end of the 19th and the beginning of the 20th centuries, five countries operated post offices on the territory of Crete. Britain and Russia issued stamps inscribed in Greek, while France and Italy used their own stamps overprinted with the name of the island.

In February 1881, while Crete was still a part of the Ottoman Empire, Greek post offices opened in the three big cities of the island, Chania, Rethymnon and Heraklion. These Greek post offices were consulate departments and they operated until the end of 1881, just for eight or nine months, using Greek stamps with designs including large Hermes heads. Due to the very short period that these services operated in Crete, the postal items, stamps and especially letters, are very rare.

The stamp for the russian post offices in Crete in the following gallery is a forgery. The type of forgery is described by Feenstra.

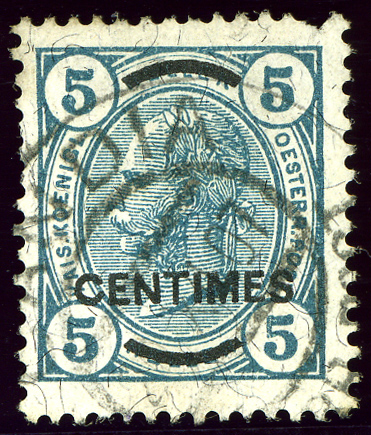
Stamp for the Austrian post offices cancelled in Candia, Crete

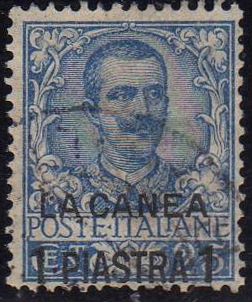
Stamp for the Italian post offices in Crete

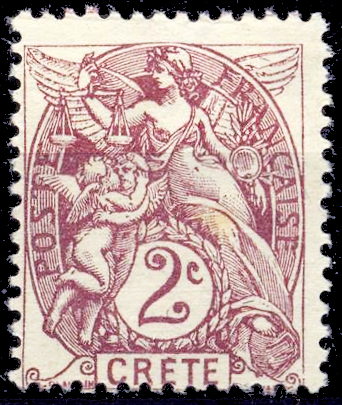
A 1902 French key type stamp for use at French post offices in Crete

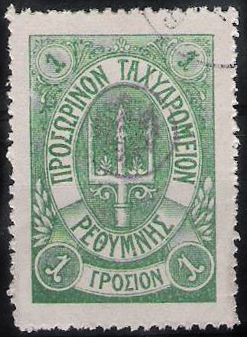
Stamp for the Russian post offices in Crete

== Greek stamps ==
Crete became part of Greece in 1913 and Greek stamps have been used on the island since 9 December 1912 in Julian Calendar.. Remaining Cretan stamps were overprinted and issued in Greece in 1923.

== Collections ==
Famous collectors of Cretan postal history include the late Dr. Angelos C. Papaioannou and Takis Karatzas from Greece but also Gunter Rhensius and Johann Ulrich Schmitt from Germany and Rienk Feenstra from the Netherlands. Currently, the probably largest and most complete collection of Cretan postal history is the one compiled by Dr. Manolis Mylonakis, but there must be a handful further large collections.

== See also ==
- Hellenic Philotelic Society
- Postage stamps and postal history of Greece
