= Postage stamps and postal history of Greece =

Greece's first postal service was founded in 1828, at the time of Greek independence from the Ottoman Empire. This initial service continued mail delivery and, later, the issuing of postage stamps until 1970. It was then succeeded by the Hellenic Post S.A. (abbreviated ΕΛΤΑ), which remains Greece's official postal provider. The first Greek stamps (known as "Large Hermes heads") were issued in 1861; by then, the postal service had expanded to operate 97 branches.

Greek 1 drachma stamp from "A M" issue, 1902

Until 1966, with the exception of a set issued in 1927, all Greek stamps were simply inscribed ΕΛΛΑΣ (Hellas, the country's Greek name). From 1966 to 1982, the inscription was modified to include both the Greek and Latin versions: ΕΛΛΑΣ-HELLAS. Beginning in 1982, ΕΛΛΑΣ was replaced with ΕΛΛΗΝΙΚΗ ΔΗΜΟΚΡΑΤΙΑ (Hellenic Republic); this inscription is still being used on Greek stamps. It was also used on the 1927 set referred to earlier.

In 1875, Greece was among the founding members of the General Postal Union (renamed the Universal Postal Union in 1878).

Greece's territory and population was greatly expanded by the 1912-1913 Balkan Wars; it acquired some additional territory during World War I. This led to the issuing of several sets of occupation stamps, which consisted of both existing stamp issues with overprints and newly printed issues. In addition to these, some of the so-called "New Territories", notably the islands of Ikaria and Samos, issued their own stamps prior to becoming part of Greece.

Beginning with the Olympic issue of 1896, Greece has issued a number of commemorative stamps. Their subjects have included Greek history, art, mythology and wildlife.

== Classic period (1859–1902) ==
=== Ionian Islands (1859–1864) ===
The first Greek-inscribed stamps were not issued by Greece proper, but by the nearby Ionian Islands. Under British rule from 1815 to 1864, this island group was known as the United States of the Ionian Islands. A set of three stamps was issued on 15 May 1859. Printed by Perkins, Bacon & Co. of London and inscribed ΙΟΝΙΚΟΝ ΚΡΑΤΟΣ (Ionian State), they depicted a profile of Queen Victoria. All were imperforate and bore no face value, this being indicated by their colors; orange (1/2 penny), blue (1 penny) and lake (2 pence). These stamps became invalid after the Ionian Islands were ceded to Greece on 28 June 1864.

=== Large Hermes heads (1861–1888) ===
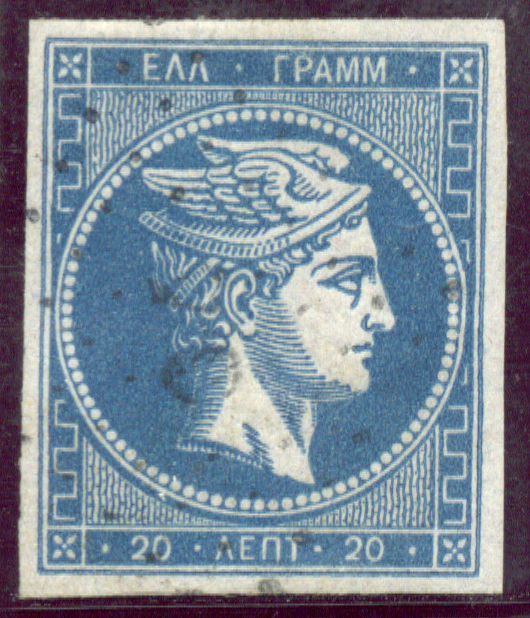
20 lepta Large Hermes head

The first stamps of Greece were the so-called "Large Hermes heads", depicting a profile of the Greek messenger god Hermes in a frame strongly resembling that used for contemporary stamps of France. The basic design was by the French engraver Albert Désiré Barre and the first batch was printed in Paris by Ernst Meyer. The first set was issued on 1 October 1861. It consisted of seven denominations (1 lepton, 2, 5, 10, 20, 40 and 80 lepta). In November 1861 the printing plates were transferred to Athens and subsequent printings made there. The plates continued in use into the mid-1880s, resulting in a number of varieties due to plates becoming worn and then cleaned, as well as the printing of the stamps on several kinds of paper. Most types were also printed with control numbers on the back, and all were imperforate. Additional denominations (30 and 60 lepta) were introduced in 1876, to comply with the General Postal Union's international letter rates (30 lepta for basic, 60 for registered letters).

=== Postage due stamps (1875–1902) ===
The first postage due stamps of Greece were issued in 1875. The first batch was printed in Vienna, as were further releases in 1876 and 1890-1893. Green to yellow-green in color, with numerals declaring each stamp's value along with the inscription ειοπρακτέον(-α) (postage due(s)) inside a central circle, these stamps are known as "rologakia" (little clocks). The first two sets consisted of twelve values; 1 lepton, 2, 5, 10, 20, 40, 60, 70, 80 and 90 lepta, 1 drachma and 2 drachmae. The third contained only the 1 lepton, 2, 5, 40 and 60 lepta. The stamps were issued with a variety of perforations: 9, 9 1/2, 10, 10 1/2 and compound.

A second design, with its inscription contained in a scroll pattern in place of the circle, was issued in 1902. Known as the London issue, it was printed by Perkins, Bacon & Co., with engraving by the Johnstonia Engraving Company. These stamps had perforations of 13 1/2. In place of the earlier issues' 60, 70, 80 and 90 lepta values, the London issue introduced new denominations of 3, 25, 30 and 50 lepta; it also dropped the 2 drachmae value. With only minor changes, this design has been used on all Greek postage due stamps since.

=== Small Hermes heads (1886–1900) ===
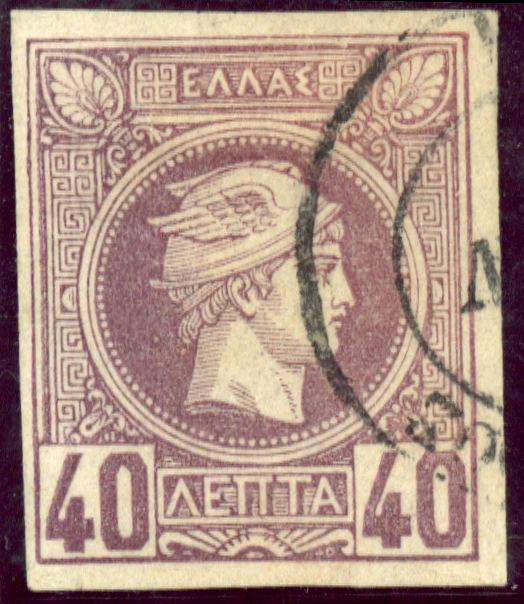
40 lepta Small Hermes head

In 1883, Greece's postal service reduced its international letter rates to 25 and 50 lepta (for basic and registered letters respectively). This, as well as the need for a new 1 drachma value to cover parcel post services, led to the issue of a new set of stamps. This set, the "Small Hermes heads", first appeared in 1886. The first batch was printed in Malines, Belgium followed by numerous reprints in Athens until 1900. Like their predecessors, they depicted Hermes in profile, but with a smaller head and a rounder helmet. Initially the sheets were imperforate. Perforated versions, initially 13 1/2 and later 11 1/2, became available in 1891. The denominations were 1 lepton, 2, 5, 10, 20, 25, 40, and 50 lepta and 1 drachma.

In September 1900 some of the small Hermes head stamps (blue 25 lepta and violet 40 lepta) were surcharged with different values (20 lepta, 1 drachma and 2 drachmae) due to the delay in printing the new Flying Mercury issue.

=== 1896 Olympic issue ===
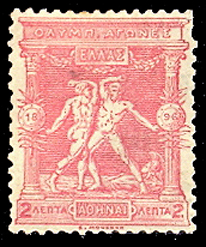
2 lepta stamp from 1896 Olympic issue

Greece's first commemorative stamps were issued in 1896 for the 1896 Summer Olympics, the first Olympic games in modern times. The series consisted of twelve values (1 lepton, 2, 5, 10, 20, 25, 40 and 60 lepta, 1 drachma and 2, 5 and 10 drachmae). There were eight different designs, by Professor I. Svoronos, which included famous sports-related images from ancient Greece, such as a chariot race and Myron's Discobolus. The stamps were designed by Swiss artist A. Guilleron, the steel dies were created by the French engraver Louis-Eugène Mouchon and printing took place at the National Printing Office of France. The name E. MOUCHON appears at the bottom side of each stamp. The stamps were delivered in perforated sheets (13 1/2 × 14). They were at first meant to be sold only during the Games, but their circulation period was extended; first to March 1897, then until they were sold out. The 1896 Olympics stamps, of which the 5 and 10 drachmae denominations are relatively rare, remain popular with collectors of topical stamps relating to sports and Olympic games.

=== A M overprints (1900–1901) ===
In 1900 and 1901, a variety of existing Greek stamps (Large Hermes heads, Small Hermes heads and 1896 Olympics) were surcharged in black or red with new values and also with the letters "A M", standing for the Greek words Αξία Μεταλλική ("Axia Metalliki" or "value in (gold) metal"), meaning that the face values were based on the gold standard of the Latin Monetary Union. These stamps were sold at the post offices at a price higher than the face value, due to the depreciation of the drachma. The "A M" stamps were mainly used for international parcel post and postal money orders, although they are sometimes found on normal letter covers. In 1902 these stamps were withdrawn and replaced with the "A M" series.

== Early 20th century (1901–1911) ==
=== Flying Mercury and A M issues (1901–1902) ===
Flying Mercury, 25 lepta (1901)

In 1901, a new series of definitive stamps was issued, replacing the small Hermes heads and the overprints of 1900. The new stamps depicted Giovanni da Bologna's statue of Hermes/Mercury (c. 1564). The series included fourteen denominations in three different designs: 1 lepton, 2, 3, 5, 10, 20, 25, 30, 40 and 50 lepta, 1 drachma and 2, 3 and 5 drachmae. The high values of this series are notable for being printed in metallic colors; bronze (2d), silver (3d), and gold (5d). The stamps were printed on two qualities of paper (thick and thin) with watermark "ET" and crown. The sheets were delivered with perforation 13 1/2 for the low values and 11 1/2 for the high values, although small quantities were delivered with different perforations.

In 1902 an additional series of five stamps was issued, depicting the head of the same statue. These stamps were in values of gold currency and inscribed "A M" for Αξία Μεταλλική ("Axia Metalliki" or "value in metal"). They replaced the provisional "A M" overprints of 1900-1901 for international parcel post and money orders. The series was printed by Perkins, Bacon & Co. on thick paper, watermarked with "ET" and crown and delivered with perforation 13 1/2. These stamps were also used briefly as revenue stamps in 1913.

The 1901–1902 issues remained in regular use until 1911.

=== 1906 Olympic issue ===
Commemorative issue for the 1906 Intercalated Games. This set of stamps was printed by Perkins, Bacon & Co. and issued on 25 March 1906. It consisted of fourteen denominations (1 lepton, 2, 3, 5, 10, 20, 25, 30, 40 and 50 lepta, 1 drachma and 2, 3 and 5 drachmae). Special commemorative cancellations were used during the Games at Zappeion (ΖΑΠΠΕΙΟΝ), Stadium (ΣΤΑΔΙΟΝ) and Acropolis (ΑΚΡΟΠΟΛΙΣ) provisional post offices. The 1906 Olympics stamps were never withdrawn and can be found with postmarks dated until 1910. They were also overprinted for use as revenue stamps.

=== 1911 Engraved issue ===
In 1911, a new series of definitive stamps was issued to replace the Flying Mercury set. There were four different designs, by I. Svoronos (who had designed the 1896 Olympic issue) and G. Jakovides, which depicted Hermes and the rainbow goddess Iris. The set consisted of sixteen values (1 lepton, 2, 3, 5, 10, 20, 25, 30, 40 and 50 lepta, 1 drachma and 2, 3, 5, 10 and 25 drachmae). It would become known as the "Engraved issue". The plates were engraved by Thomas McDonald (UK) and printing was done by the firm Gerasimos Aspiotis Bros. of Corfu. The sheets were delivered on unwatermarked paper with perforation 13 1/2.

The 3, 5 and 10 drachmae stamps from this set were re-issued in 1921 with slightly altered dimensions, measuring 20 1/2 × 25 1/2 mm.; the original issue measured 20 1/2 × 26 1/2 mm.

== Territorial expansion (1912–1923) ==
=== General issue ΕΛΛΗΝΙΚΗ ΔΙΟΙΚΗΣΙΣ (1912–1913) ===
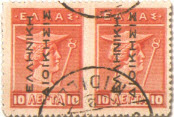
General issue overprinted ΕΛΛΗΝΙΚΗ ΔΙΟΙΚΗΣΙΣ

Greece's borders were greatly expanded by the Balkan Wars of 1912–1913 as it occupied Macedonia including the city of Thessaloniki, parts of Epirus and Thrace and various Aegean islands, as well as formally annexing Crete. Until these so-called "New Territories" were formally incorporated into Greece, they were not permitted to use regular Greek stamps. In order to cover postal needs in these areas, Greece's government ordered existing stamps to be overprinted with ΕΛΛΗΝΙΚΗ ΔΙΟΙΚΗΣΙΣ (Hellenic Administration) until a planned 1912 issue became available. A special overprint, ΛΗΜΝΟΣ, was also ordered for use on the island of Lemnos, which was occupied in October 1912. These overprints, in three different colors (black, red and carmine), were applied to the 1911 "Engraved" definitives, the 20 lepta Flying Mercury stamp, the 1902 postage due stamps and some of the 1913 "Lithographic" definitives. This issue went through several printings, initially by Aspiotis Bros. and later by the Aquarone printing house of Thessaloniki. The overprints normally read from the bottom of the stamp to the top; due to misplacement of sheets in the printing press, some were released with the overprint reading from top to bottom.

A variation of this overprint, consisting of the letters "Ε.*Δ" in red, was employed on the island of Chios in 1913. This was applied locally to a quantity of 25 lepta stamps from the ΕΛΛΗΝΙΚΗ ΔΙΟΙΚΗΣΙΣ issue which were mistakenly delivered without the overprint.

=== Campaign issue and Souda Bay issue (1913) ===
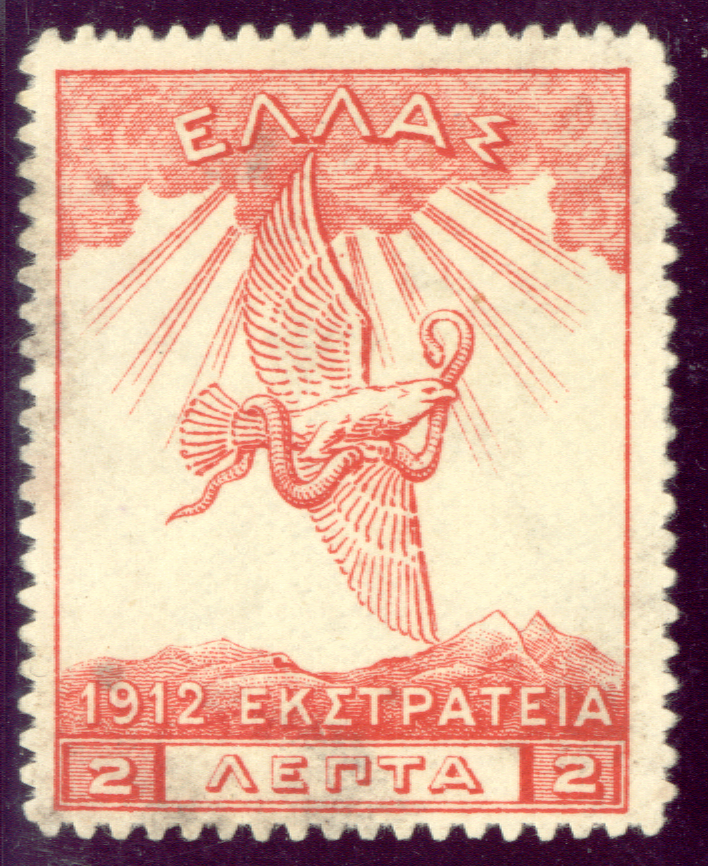
2 lepta Campaign stamp

A set of sixteen stamps was issued in April 1913, to replace the provisional ΕΛΛΗΝΙΚΗ ΔΙΟΙΚΗΣΙΣ and ΛΗΜΝΟΣ overprints in territories under Greek military occupation. Two designs were used, depicting Constantine the Great's vision and the Eagle of Zeus; this set would become known as the "Campaign issue". It consisted of the following values: 1 lepton, 2, 3, 5, 10, 20, 25, 30, 40 and 50 lepta, 1 drachma and 2, 3, 5, 10 and 25 drachmae. It was printed by Aspiotis Bros. using the lithographic process. The stamps were printed on two types of paper, smooth and rough, with perforation 13 1/2. These stamps were occasionally also used in Greece proper.

Souda Bay commemorative, with March 1914 cancellation

In 1916, certain values of the Campaign issue were overprinted with Ι. Κοινότης Αγ. Όρους (Holy Community of Mount Athos). Intended for local use in the Mount Athos area, these overprinted stamps were never put into circulation; most of them were burned in the 1930s. There were two types of overprint; horizontal (applied to the 1 lepton, 2, 3, and 15 lepta and 2 drachmae values) and vertical (applied to the 20 lepta).

A 25 lepta commemorative stamp was issued on 1 December 1913 for use only by Cretan post offices. This stamp depicts the 1 May 1913 raising of the Greek flag on Souda Island, marking the annexation of Crete to the Kingdom of Greece. It was printed by Bradbury, Wilkinson & Co. of London with perforation 14 1/2. It remained in circulation for only one year.

=== Lithographic issue (1913–1923) ===
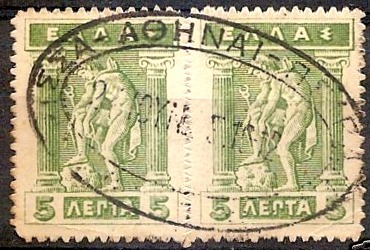
5 lepta pair of the 1913 Lithographic definitives

The First Balkan War, and the new territory it brought Greece, led to an increase in demand for definitive stamps. The increased demand, combined with a wartime money shortage, led the Greek government to seek the least expensive means of producing stamps in large quantities. It was decided to re-print the existing definitives using lithography; the resulting set is known as the "Lithographic issue". Also printed by Aspiotis Bros., the sheets were delivered on unwatermarked paper with perforation 13 1/2. The eighteen values in this set were not issued all at once, but ranged in date from 1913 to 1923, as follows: 1 lepton, 2, 3, 5, 10, 20 and 25 lepta (1913); 15 lepta (1918); 30, 40 and 50 lepta (1914); 80 lepta (1923); 1 drachma, 2 drachmae (1919); 3 drachmae (1920); 5, 10 and 25 drachmae (1922).

The 25 and 40 lepta and 1 drachma values from this set were re-issued in 1926, printed in Vienna using new plates.

=== Ikaria, Mytilene and Samos (1912–1915) ===
The Aegean islands of Ikaria and Samos successfully rebelled against Ottoman rule shortly before the First Balkan War, in July and September 1912 respectively. The former was declared the "Free State of Ikaria" by a provisional government, which proceeded to issue its own stamps. These were printed by Stangel & Co. in Athens and issued in October 1912. They were inscribed ΕΛΕΥΘΕΡΑ ΠΟΛΙΤΕΙΑ ΙΚΑΡΙΑΣ (Free State of Ikaria) and depicted Penelope, the wife of Odysseus. The values in this set of eight consisted of 2, 5, 10, 25 and 50 lepta, 1 drachma and 2 and 5 drachmae. Ikaria was occupied by Greek forces in November 1912, after which overprinted Greek stamps replaced the local issue.

Though the revolutionary government on Samos wished to become part of Greece, this did not happen until late 1914 when a General Administrator was sent from Athens to take charge. In the meantime, the Samian government issued several sets of stamps. The first, issued on 14 November 1912, was a set of three depicting a map of Samos with the inscription ΠΡΟΣΩΡΙΝΟΝ ΤΑΧΥΔΡΟΜΕΙΟΝ ΣΑΜΟΥ (Provisional Post Office of Samos). All were imperforate and printed locally by hand. The second, depicting a profile of Hermes, was printed by Stangel & Co. and released in two batches. The first batch, issued on 26 November, consisted of five values (1 lepton, 5, 10, 25 and 50 lepta) with perforation 11 1/2; the second, issued on 22 December, was overprinted with ΕΛΛΑΣ in boldface type. It included the values from the first batch plus a 1 drachma value. This would be known as the "Large ΕΛΛΑΣ" overprint to distinguish it from a second, thinner overprint applied in February 1914 (the "Thin ΕΛΛΑΣ"). A third set, the "castles" issue, was released on 4 January 1913. Consisting of five values (1 drachma, 2, 5, 10 and 25 drachmae), it commemorated both an 1824 Greek victory over the Ottoman Empire at Gerontas Bay and the 1912 vote for union with Greece. The stamps were printed at the shop of lithographer O.K. Travlos in Vathy and signed ΘΣ, the initials of Samian president Themistoklis Sophoulis. Red ink was used for the signatures on all values except the 25 drachmae, on which black ink was used. An illustrated postal card was issued along with the Hermes set; printed on one side was the 5 lepta value from that set and the Greek coat of arms, the other side depicted Vathy palace and portraits of Sophoulis and Lykourgos Logothetis, the island's leader in the Greek War of Independence. All issues were replaced by the ΕΛΛΗΝΙΚΗ ΔΙΟΙΚΗΣΙΣ and Campaign stamps when Greece assumed control of Samos. In December 1914 some of the Hermes and "castles" stamps were re-issued as charity stamps, with the overprint Γενική Διοίκησις Σάμου (General Administration of Samos).

Mytilene was occupied by Greek forces near the end of 1912. Turkish stamps were seized from the main post office and overprinted with Ελληνική Κατοχή Μυτιλήνης ("Greek Occupation of Mytilene"). This overprint was applied at the print shop of the newspaper Salpinx ("Trumpet"). Since there was no Greek currency available on Mytilene at the time, the overprinted stamps retained their value in Turkish paras and piastres.

=== Greek Occupation of Thrace (1913, 1920) ===
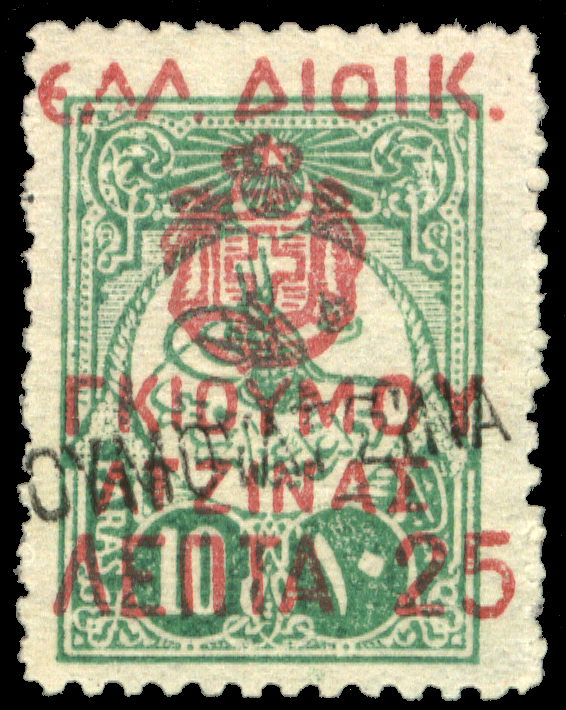
25 lepta Giumulzina occupation stamp

During the Second Balkan War, several cities in Thrace came under Greek occupation. Overprinted stamps were subsequently issued for the Thracian cities of Dedeagatch (July 1913) and Giumulzina (August 1913). In the former, a three-line overprint reading ΕΛΛΗΝΙΚΗ ΔΙΟΙΚΗΣΙΣ ΔΕΔΕΑΓΑΤΣ (Hellenic Administration of Dedeagatch) along with new values was applied to stamps of Bulgaria. This was followed by three sets of locally printed stamps, one in July and two in September 1913. Printed on three different colors of paper (white, yellow and blue), they were inscribed ΕΛΛΗΝΙΚΗ ΔΙΟΙΚΗΣΙΣ ΔΕΔΕΑΓΑΤΣ with values at the bottom. The September issues bore the added inscription ΠΡΟΣΩΡΙΝΟΝ (Provisional). In the latter, the overprint ΕΛΛ. ΔΙΟΙΚ. ΓΚΙΟΥΜΟΥΛΤΖΙΝΑΣ (Hellenic Administration of Giumulzina) in blue and red was applied to Turkish stamps along with new values (10 and 25 lepta). Both cities were returned to Bulgaria after the war.

In 1920, after World War I, Greece regained control of western Thrace. The Greek occupying authorities issued three sets of stamps for use in the region: stamps from the "Engraved", "Lithographic" and 1916 "ET" issues overprinted with Διοίκησις Δυτικής Θράκης (Administration of Western Thrace), released in May 1920; Turkish stamps overprinted with Υπάτη Αρμοστεία Θράκης (High Commission of Thrace) and new values, released in July 1920; and Greek stamps from the three sets listed above, overprinted with Διοίκησις Θράκης and released the same year.

=== Royal Government ET issue (1916) ===
During World War I, Greece was divided over the question of joining the Entente Powers or staying neutral (the National Schism). In October 1916 a pro-Entente group formed a separate, provisional government in Thessaloniki, led by Eleftherios Venizelos. The Athens government, to prevent them from using stamps already in circulation, ordered those stamps to be overprinted with the letters "ET" and the Greek crown. This overprint was applied to stamps from the "Engraved" and "Lithographic" sets, which were then issued on 1 November 1916.

=== Thessaloniki Provisional Government issue (1917) ===
In response to the "ET" overprints, Venizelos' Provisional Government ordered the engraving and printing of a new set of stamps from Perkins, Bacon and Co. Their design was based on the Iris stamps from the 1911 issue, with the additional inscription ΠΡΟΣΩΡΙΝΗ ΚΥΒΕΡΝΗΣΙΣ (Provisional Government). The set was lithographed on porous paper, with a perforation of 14 1/2. It consisted of eleven values: 1 lepton, 5, 10, 25 and 50 lepta, 1 drachma and 2, 3, 5, 10 and 25 drachmae. A 4 drachmae value was also printed, but was only used as a revenue stamp.

== 1920s and 1930s ==
=== 1922 Revolution overprints (1923) ===
In May 1923, the overprint ΕΠΑΝΑΣΤΑΣΙΣ 1922 (Revolution of 1922) was applied to existing stamps of Crete and Greece, including the 1913 Campaign and 1917 Provisional Government issues. The overprint was in commemoration of the 1922 Revolution which led to the second abdication of King Constantine I, and was applied at the National Printing House in Athens.

=== Definitive issues ===
A new set of definitive stamps was issued on 1 April 1927. Its fourteen values (5, 10, 20, 25, 40, 50, and 80 lepta, 1 drachma and 2, 3, 10, 15 and 25 drachmae) depicted various landscapes and costumes of Greece, such as the Corinth Canal and the White Tower of Thessaloniki; therefore it was known as the "Landscapes set". A 1 lepton value was printed but never issued. The printing plates were manufactured by the firm Thomas McDonald of London and printing took place at Aspiotis Bros. Several later issues were intended to supplement this set; the 1933 Republic set (50, 75 and 100 drachmae), the 1934 Athens Stadium stamp (8 drachmae) and the 1935 Mystras stamp (4 drachmae). Between 1931 and 1935, the 50 lepta, 1 drachma, and 2, 3, 10, 15 and 25 drachmae values were re-issued. The set was withdrawn from circulation in 1939.

A further definitive issue was released in the late 1930s. Known as the "Historical issue", it was issued in three phases. Its first phase, issued on 1 November 1937, was a set of four stamps which depicted King George II, including values of 1 drachma and 3, 8 and 100 drachmae. The 3 drachmae value represented the domestic postal rate, and the 8 drachmae value the international postal rate. On 1 November 1937 the second phase, devoted to Themes from the evolution of the Greek civilization, was issued. It consisted of thirteen values (5, 10, 20, 40, 50, and 80 lepta and 2, 5, 6, 7, 10, 15 and 25 drachmae) depicting important works of art and episodes in Greek history, such as the Venus de Milo, the Battle of Salamis and St. Paul preaching in Athens. The third phase was issued on 8 October 1938 to commemorate the unveiling of a statue of King Constantine I in Athens; it depicted that statue and consisted of two values (1.5 and 30 drachmae).

The "Historical issue" was withdrawn from circulation in 1941 (the King George and King Constantine issues) and 1943 (the Greek civilization set).

=== Early airmail stamps (1926–1939) ===
Greece's first airmail stamps, known as the "Patagonia set", were released in mid-October 1926. They were intended for use on airmail letters from Greece to Italy and Turkey, and produced by the Italian firm Aero Espresso Italiana (AEI). The design, by A. Gavalas, depicted flying boats against various backgrounds. The set was printed in Milan, Italy, reputedly by the firm Bestetti & Tumminelli, and consisted of four values (2, 3, 5 and 10 drachmae). This issue remained in circulation until 1933, when it was replaced by the zeppelin and "Aeroespresso" issues, also produced by AEI.

The zeppelin issue, consisting of three values (30, 100 and 120 drachmae), was issued 2 May 1933 and remained on sale until 27 May. It was released in connection with the LZ 127 Graf Zeppelin's 29 May flight to Rome and depicted a zeppelin flying over the Acropolis of Athens.

Its successor, the "Aeroespresso set", was released on 10 October 1933; its designs depicted flight-related themes. It was printed by Bradbury, Wilkinson & Co. of London and consisted of seven values (50 lepta, 1 drachma, 3, 5, 10, 20 and 50 drachmae). This set remained in circulation until 1935.

All unsold stamps from these three sets were returned to AEI, who then placed them on the philatelic market.

On 2 November 1933 the Greek government, in conjunction with the Hellenic Aerial Communications Company, issued its own set of airmail stamps for general use. The plates were produced by Thomas De La Rue (UK) and the printing was done by Aspioti-ELKA. This set, depicting airplanes over various locations in Greece, consisted of seven values (50 lepta, 1 drachma, 2, 5, 10, 25 and 50 drachmae).

After the "Aeroepresso" set was withdrawn from circulation in 1935, Greece issued a new set of nine airmail stamps. Called the "Mythological issue", its designs, by M. Biskinis, depicted figures from ancient Greek mythology like Daedalus, Icarus, Helios and Athena. As with the first government issue, the plates were produced by Thomas De La Rue and the printing done by Aspioti ELKA. It was released on 10 November 1935 and consisted of nine values (1 drachma, 2, 5, 7, 10, 25, 30, 50 and 100 drachmae). Due to vast growth in airmail correspondence in the mid-to-late 1930s, several values of this set (1 drachma, 2, 5, 7 and 10 drachmae) were re-issued in 1937 and 1939.

== World War II (1940–1945) ==
=== Definitive issues ===
In April–May 1941, Greece came under Axis occupation, which lasted until October 1944. During this time, regular Greek stamps continued to be issued. A new definitive set depicting Greek landscapes including the Meteora monasteries and Aspropotamos River, intended to replace the 1937 "Historical issue", was released in two batches of nine. The first was issued in 1942 and consisted of 2, 5, 10, 15, 25, 50, 75, 100 and 200 drachmae values. Due to vastly increasing inflation later in the occupation period, the second batch, issued in 1944, bore higher values ranging from 500 to 5,000,000 drachmae. This set remained in circulation until 11 November 1944. On that date, to accompany a post-occupation money reform, three stamps from the "Historical" set (the 50 lepta and 2 and 5 drachmae values) were issued with the overprint ΔΡΑΧΜΑΙ ΝΕΑΙ (New Drachmae). The new exchange rate was fixed at 50 billion old drachmae to 1 new drachma. In May 1945, the 6 drachma "Historical" value was issued with the same overprint.

In 1945 a new set of eight definitives, the "Glory issue", was released. Intended to cover regular mail, airmail and international parcel post as well as replace the ΔΡΑΧΜΑΙ ΝΕΑΙ set, it included values of 1 drachma, 3, 5, 10, 20, 50, 100 and 200 drachmae and was perforated 12 1/2 × 13 1/2. This set was named for its depiction of Nikolaos Gysis' painting The Glory of Psara.

During the occupation, Greek airmail was limited to two domestic routes; Athens-Thessaloniki and Athens-Heraklion. Foreign destinations were likewise restricted to Germany, Italy and certain Axis-occupied countries. At first, Greek postage due stamps were converted for airmail use by being overprinted with a small airplane design in red. However, these sold out rather quickly, creating the need for a new issue. A set of six values (2, 5, 10, 20, 25 and 50 drachmae) with designs by O. Perivolarakis depicting various Anemoi, or wind gods, was released on 15 August 1942. This set was re-printed in 1943, with three existing values (10, 25 and 50 drachmae) in different colors from the originals and three new values (100, 200 and 400 drachmae). Inflation rendered these stamps useless for mailing by April 1944; they were withdrawn from circulation in July. In the meantime, the use of regular stamps to cover airmail rates was allowed.

=== Semi-postal stamps ===
Greece's first semi-postal stamps were produced during the occupation. The first, a set of three, was issued on 3 October 1943. It consisted of the following values and designs; 25 + 25 drachmae (portrait of a child), 100 + 50 drachmae (portrait of a mother and baby) and 200 + 100 drachmae (portrait of the Virgin Mary and infant Christ). Use of these stamps was mandatory on domestic mail through that month; proceeds from their sale went toward the Patriotic Charity and Awareness Institution Fund, for use in children's welfare programs. A second semi-postal set of ten, consisting of 1942 definitives and 1944 airmail issues surcharged with ΒΟΜΒΑΡΔΙΣΜΟΣ ΠΕΙΡΑΙΩΣ 11-1-1944 ΔΡ. 100.000 (Bombardment of Piraeus 11-1-1944 dr. 100,000), was issued on 11 June 1944. This set's proceeds were used to aid the families of victims of the Allied bombardment of Piraeus in January 1944. It was withdrawn from circulation on 30 June 1944. On 20 July 1944 a third set, also of ten and again using definitive and airmail stamps, was released. Its overprint read ΠΑΙΔΙΚΑΙ ΕΞΟΧΑΙ ΔΡΧ. 50.000 + 450.000 (Children's camps dr. 50,000 + 450,000); proceeds went toward the support of children's camps. This set was withdrawn from circulation on 11 November 1944.

=== National Resistance issues ===
Resistance movements formed throughout Greece not long after its occupation. The two largest resistance groups, the National Liberation Front (E.A.M.) and the National Republican Greek League (E.D.E.S.), produced stamps for use in areas under their control - though few of them would actually be used postally.

E.A.M.'s single issue, a set of eight consisting of eight values (1000, 2000, 4000, 6000, 8000, 10000, 25000 and 40000 drachmae) inscribed ΕΛΕΥΘΕΡΗ ΕΛΛΑΔΑ ("Free Greece"), was produced on 25 February 1944. The set was never used, though some were cancelled with an E.A.M. handstamp.

E.D.E.S. produced three sets, only one of which saw postal use. The first two, a set of five (values 15, 25, 50, 100 and 200 drachmae) and a single stamp (1000 drachmae) inscribed Free Greece, were produced in 1943 and July 1944 respectively; all were imperforate. Almost all stamps from their second issue were confiscated by the occupying Germans. The third set, which unlike the others was perforated, was produced on 23 July. Issued to commemorate two years of E.D.E.S.' existence, it consisted of four values (2000, 4000, 6000 and 8000 drachmae). It was not placed on sale until 25 November 1944. This date marked the second anniversary of the Resistance's destruction of the Gorgopotamos railway bridge. To commemorate that event, the third E.D.E.S. issue was overprinted with ΓΟΡΓΟΠΟΤΑΜΟΣ 25-11-1942 (Gorgopotamos 25-11-1942) and placed on sale for one day at the Ioannina post office with the condition that they would be attached to a cover.

As Greece was gradually liberated from occupation in 1944, local overprints and new values on the 1942 definitives were used for mail in some of the newly freed areas; Lefkada, Lesbos, Agrinio and Preveza. Values on these overprinted issues ranged from 100,000 to 10,000,000 drachmae.

== Post-war definitive issues ==
In 1946-47 a new set of eighteen definitives, the "chain surcharges", was issued. Stamps from the 1937 "Historical issue" and 1942 definitives and airmail stamps were surcharged in red or black with the design of a closed chain and new values. Since then, Greece has released over twenty definitive issues with subjects including its culture, landscapes, mythology and royalty. Examples include the Dodecanese union set (twenty-three values released between 1947 and 1951), the Marshall Plan set (six values, 1951), the National products set (seven values, 1953), the ancient art series (1954–55, 1958–60), the ancient coins series (1959, 1963), the tourist publicity set (seventeen values, 1961), the King Paul set (ten values, 1964), the labors of Hercules set (eleven values, 1970), the national costumes series (1972–74), the Homer's epics set (fifteen values, 1983), the capitals of prefectures series (1988, 1990, 1992, 1994), the Greek dances set (2002) and the Greek islands series (2004, 2006).

Greece's final set of airmail stamps, a set of seven depicting Greek harbors, was issued in 1958.

== Commemorative stamps ==
Starting with the 1896 Olympic issue, Greece has issued a number of commemorative stamps. Subjects depicted include political and military leaders, athletic events, ancient and modern Greek culture, archaeological discoveries, and wildlife. The "Anniversaries and events" set of 15 March 1982 marked the first contemporary use of the ΕΛΛΗΝΙΚΗ ΔΗΜΟΚΡΑΤΙΑ-HELLAS inscription. A brief survey of Greek commemoratives:

- Europa - Beginning in 1960, Greece has issued yearly commemoratives as part of the Europa stamp program. It used the common design through 1973; starting in 1974, it has issued stamps with Greek themes like the 1980 Europa issue depicting Giorgos Seferis and Maria Callas.
- Olympics - Also starting in 1960, commemorative sets have been issued in honor of each Olympic Games; a number of these were issued for the 2004 Summer Olympics in Athens, including a set depicting Greek medal winners.
- Ancient Greece - Subjects commemorated include Pythagoras (1955), ancient Greek theatre (1959), Minoan art (1961), Greek mythology (1972–1974), Alexander the Great (1977), Aristotle (1978), Aristarchus of Samos (1980), the Elgin Marbles (1984), the Muses (1991) and ancient Greek technology such as the Antikythera mechanism (2006).
- Political and military figures - Individuals commemorated include King Constantine I (1936), Eleftherios Venizelos (1946), King George II (1947), Archbishop Makarios III of Cyprus (1977), Georgios Karaiskakis (1982), Andreas Papandreou (1997) and Constantine Karamanlis (1999).
- Wars - Several commemorative singles and sets have been dedicated to the Greek War of Independence and Greece's role in World War II. Subjects include Lord Byron (1924), the fall of Missolonghi (1926), General Charles Fabvier (1927), the Battle of Navarino (1927–28), the centenary of Greek independence (1930), Greek participation in World War II (1947), the Battle of Crete (1950) and the anti-Axis resistance (1982).
- Greek culture - Subjects have included the University of Athens (1937), the Mount Athos monasteries (1963), the artist El Greco (1965), the University of Thessaloniki (1975), actress/politician Melina Mercouri (1995), and composer Vangelis (2013).
- Wildlife - Commemorative subjects have included the Nature Conservation Year (1970), Greek wildflowers (1978) and rare birds (1979).
- Archaeology - Stamps have been issued to commemorate Heinrich Schliemann (1976, 1990), as well as archaeological discoveries at Thera (1973) and Vergina (1979).
- Airmail issues - Two sets of commemorative airmail stamps were issued in the 1950s; a 1952 set of four marking the third anniversary of the end of the Greek Civil War and a 1954 set of 3 for the fifth anniversary of NATO.

== Charity stamps ==
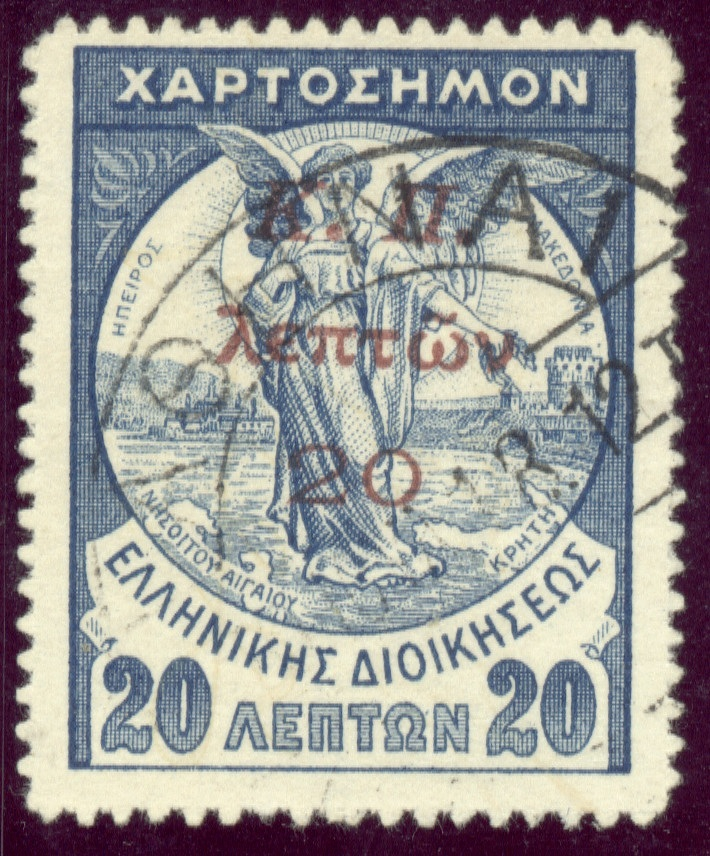
Charity stamp, "K.Π." overprint on revenue stamp (1917)

Charity stamps benefiting various foundations were issued between 1914 and 1956. The first, a set of two from 1914 depicted the allegorical figure "The Tragedy of War". Its values were 2 and 5 lepta; proceeds went to the National Welfare Foundation. Other early issues included a 5 lepta stamp for the Greek Women's Patriotic League, released in 1915 and depicting the League's badge, and several for the Red Cross Fund. Issued in 1915, 1918 and 1924, their designs included the Red Cross symbol along with nurses and wounded soldiers. The 1918 issue was also released with the overprint "Π.Ι.Π." (Patriotic Relief Institution); proceeds went to the Greek Patriotic League.

During the National Schism of 1917, the Athens government ordered the surcharge "K.Π." and new values applied to Flying Mercury, Campaign and revenue stamps. At first, this only applied to those parts of Greece they controlled; for a short time after the Schism ended, use of these surcharged stamps was extended to the whole country.

In 1939, a set of three (10 and 50 lepta and 1 drachma) which depicted Queens Olga and Sophia was released.

A number of charity stamps were produced to benefit postal workers; initially proceeds went to the Postal Clerks' Tuberculosis Fund, to aid postal workers suffering from that disease. Later, starting in 1946, they were applied to the Postal Clerks' Welfare Fund. The first issue, a set of three (10, 20 and 50 lepta) depicting the goddess Hygeia, was released in 1934. It was re-released in 1935, with the inscription ΕΛΛΑΣ added at the top of each stamp. Use of these stamps was obligatory on all mail during four weeks of the year, including Christmas, Easter and the New Year, and year-round on parcel post packages. The 50 lepta stamp from the 1935 set was re-issued in 1939 with different colors; in 1941, Hygeia stamps were released with a surcharge of 50 lepta. In addition, from 1940 to 1945, surcharges and new values were applied to stamps from the 1927 Landscapes set, the "Historical issue", the 1939 charity set and 1942 definitives.

Other charity stamps included the Thessaloniki International Fair Fund issue, a 20 lepta stamp from 1934 which depicted St. Demetrius; its use was obligatory on domestic mail from Thessaloniki. It was re-issued with a 1 drachma surcharge in 1942. St. Demetrius was also depicted on a 50 drachmae charity stamp released in 1948; proceeds from its sale went toward the restoration of historic sites and churches destroyed during World War II.

Later issues included a 1953 set of two (300 and 500 drachmae) to raise funds for reconstruction in the Ionian Islands after an earthquake and a 1956 set of two (50 lepta and 1 drachma) for the Macedonian Studies Society Fund, to help finance archaeological studies in the region.

== Postal stationery ==
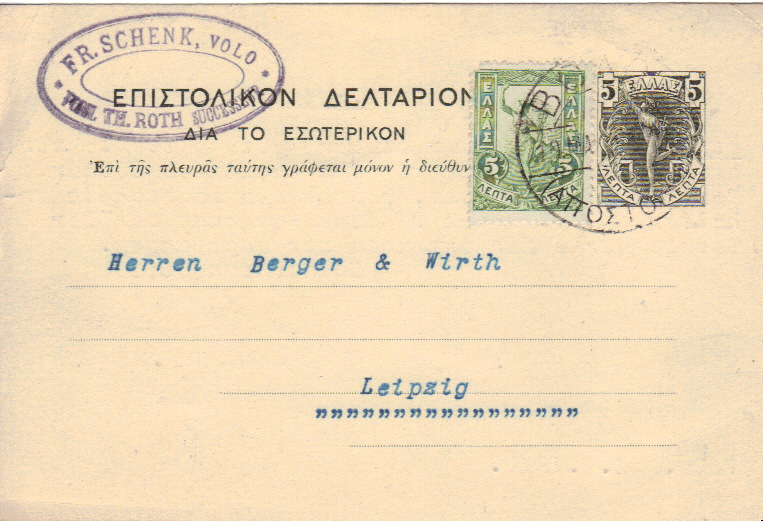
5 lepta Flying Mercury postal stationery card with added 5 lepta Flying Mercury stamp. Mailed from Volos to Germany, 1910.

The first items of postal stationery to be issued by Greece were postcards in 1876, post paid envelopes and Lettercards were issued in 1894 followed by newspaper wrappers in 1901. Aerogrammes were first issued in 1967. Postcards and aerogrammes continue to be available to this day. The last issue of envelopes was in 1941. Three different values of newspaper wrappers were issued in 1901, in 1911 one new newspaper wrapper was issued and no further newspaper wrappers were issued after this date.

Imprints on newspaper wrappers: 1, 2 and 5 lepta of the 1901 issue and 1 lepta of the 1911 issue

== See also ==
- Hellenic Post
- Hellenic Philotelic Society
- Postage stamps and postal history of Crete
- Postage stamps and postal history of Epirus

== References and sources ==
Notes

Sources

- A. Karamitsos Public Auction 125: "Kassandros" Collection of Small Hermes Heads. A. Karamitsos, Editor in Chief Michael Tsipidis. February 2001.
- "Athens Postal & Philatelic Museum - FAQ". Archived from the original on 2011-07-21.
- Clogg, Richard (1992). A Concise History of Greece. Cambridge University Press. ISBN 0-521-37830-3.
- Hellas stamp catalogue, Editor in Chief Michael Tsipidis. Vol. 1 (2008 ed.). A. Karamitsos. ISBN 978-960-88964-4-4.
- Hellas stamp catalogue, Editor in Chief Michael Tsipidis. Vol. 2 (2008 ed.). A. Karamitsos. ISBN 978-960-88964-5-1.
- Keegan, John (1998). The First World War. Alfred A. Knopf. ISBN 0-375-40052-4.
- Linn's World Stamp Almanac (Fifth ed.). Amos Press. 1989. ISBN 0-940403-20-X.
- Rossiter, Stuart; Flower, John (1986). The Stamp Atlas. Facts on File Publications. ISBN 0-8160-1346-2.
- Scott catalogue. Vol. 3 (2001 ed.). Scott Publishing. 2000. ISBN 0-89487-262-1.
