= Hellenic Post =

State-owned provider of postal services in Greece

- Native name: Ελληνικά Ταχυδρομεία
- Type: Anonymi Etairia
- Industry: Postal services, Courier
- Founded: 1828 (as organisation); 1970 (as company)
- Headquarters: 200 Ionias Avenue & 61 Iakovaton St., 111 44, Athens, Greece
- Area served: Greece
- Key people: Kostas Masselos (Chairman); Michael Mavropoulos(CEO)
- Services: Letter post, parcel service, EMS, delivery, freight forwarding, third-party logistics
- Revenue: €318.46 million (2020)
- Operating income: €(17.83) million (2020)
- Net income: €9.58 million (2020)
- Total assets: €584.88 million (2020)
- Total equity: €38.77 million (2020)
- Owner: HCAP (100%)
- Number of employees: 7,000 (2020)
- Website: elta.gr

The Hellenic Post S.A. (Greek: Ελληνικά Ταχυδρομεία, abbreviated ΕΛΤΑ, ELTA) is the state-owned provider of postal services in Greece. It succeeded the former government Postal Service, founded in 1828. ELTA provides a universal postal service to all parts of Greece and is a member of the Universal Postal Union. Services provided include: letter post; parcel service; deposit accounts; Swiftpost, a nationwide next-day delivery service; and the EMS international express mail service.

== History ==
Hellenic Post was founded in 1828 along with the modern Greek state. Since 1996 it has been operating as a public limited company owned by the state.

In 1834 an agreement with French banker Francois Feraldi ensured mail service to and from the Greek islands, and in 1836 placed the first wagons for transporting mail between Athens and Piraeus.

In 1860 the law on stamps came into force, and the first Greek postage stamp was printed at the Paris Mint, symbolically the head of Hermes.

In 1869 ELTA started using the Greek railway system, and in 1874 it was one of the founding members in the Universal Postal Union established in Bern.

In 1892 telephone services were added to the responsibilities of the post.

In 1909 the company inaugurated the rural postal service, which for remained for decades the sole means of communication for farmers in difficult to reach rural areas.

Starting in 1926, the Italian Aero Espresso started offering its services to ELTA for mail delivery by plane.

During the Greek Civil War, the post office was always present, ensuring and enabling communication with the front. In 1949, with the establishment of OTE, the telegraph and telephone services were separated from the postal service, which now became the sole service of ELTA.

Since 2006 ELTA have been providing banking services, in accordance with the partnership with Hellenic Postbank.

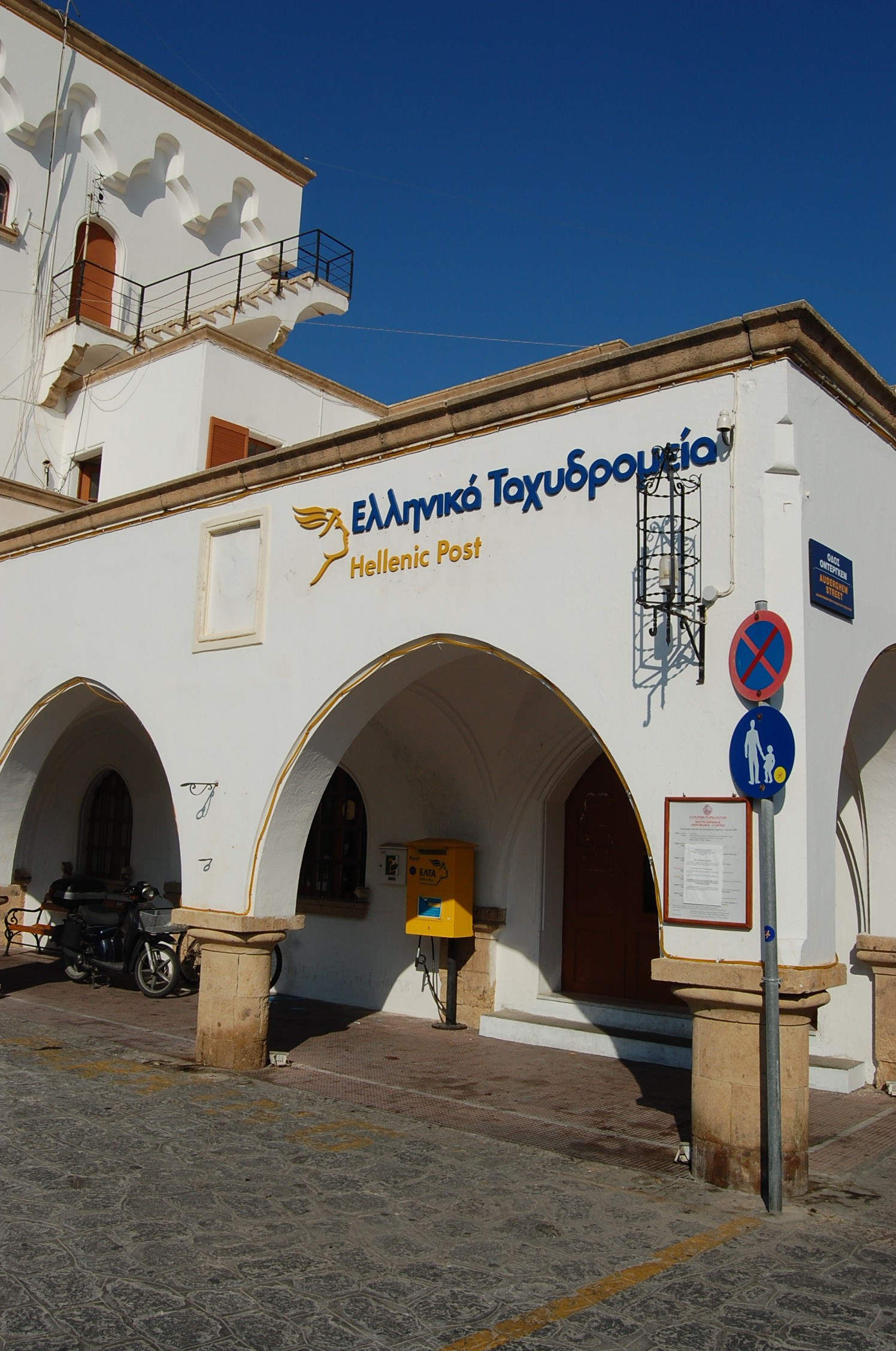
Post office in Patmos

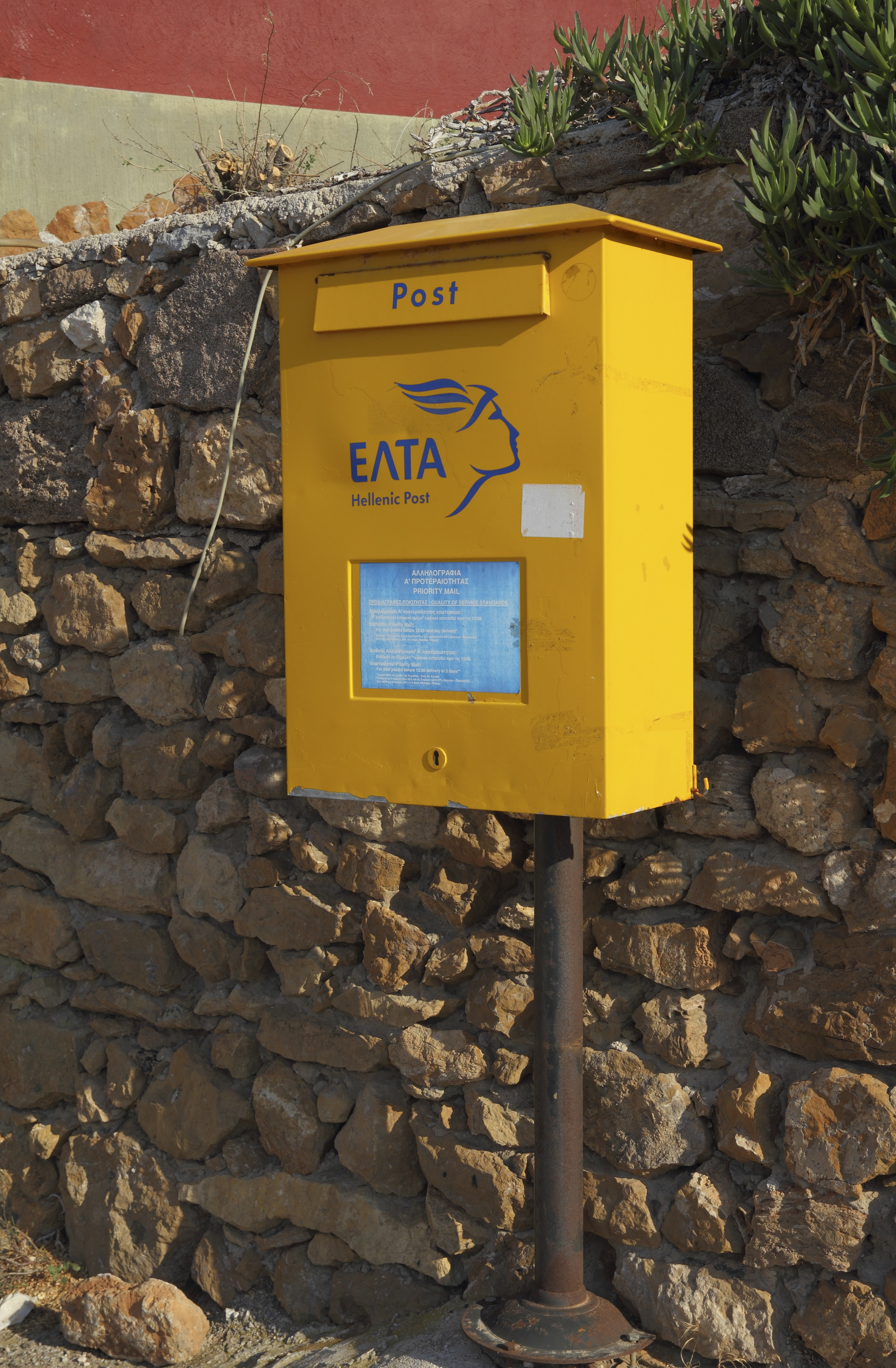
Post box at Cape Sounion

Hellenic Post, Courier Service logo

== See also ==
- Postage stamps and postal history of Greece
