= Fractal art =

Form of algorithmic art

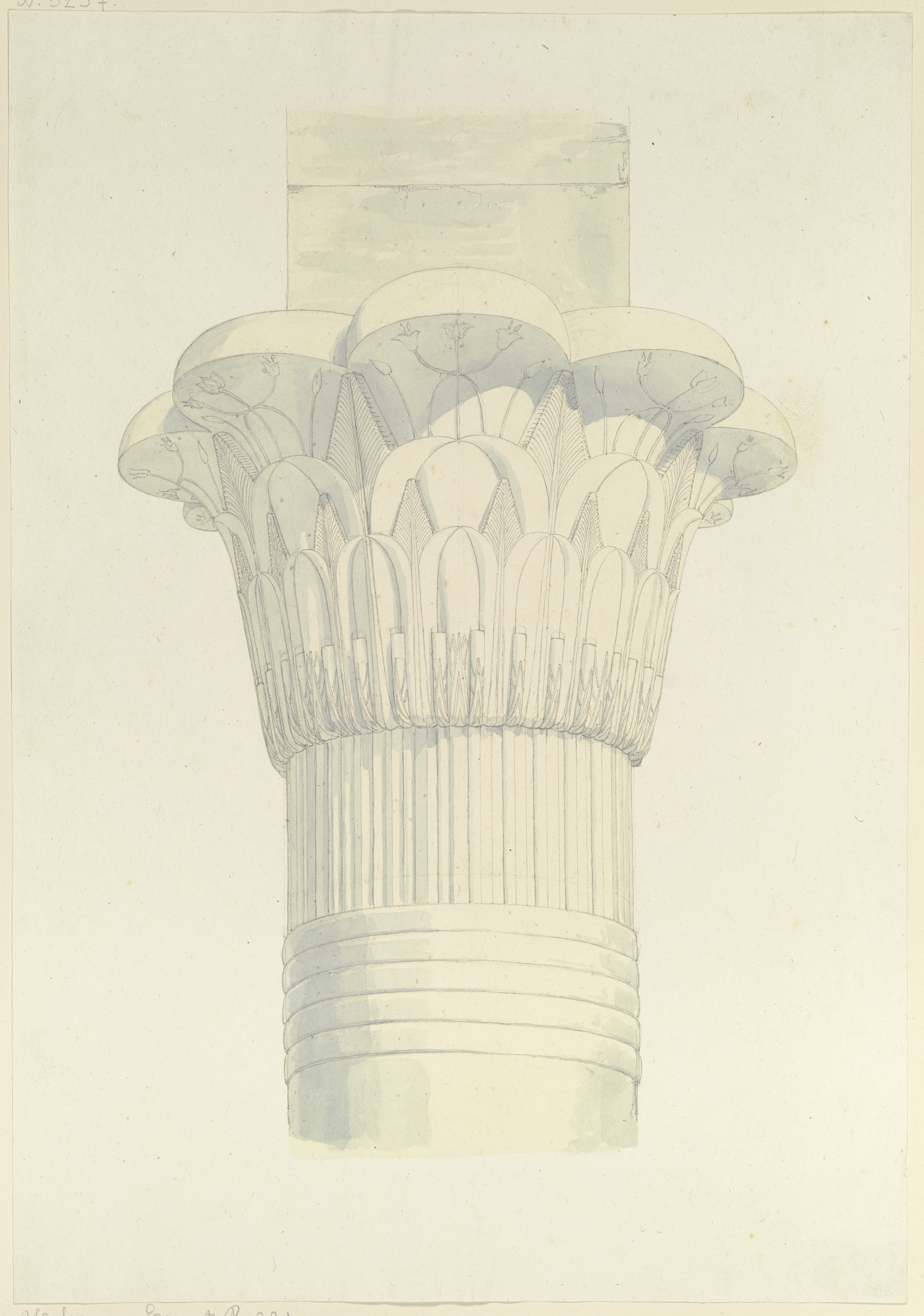
Ancient Egyptian capitals sometimes incorporate fractal art, reflecting their cosmogony which often used the self-similar, nested structure of the lotus blossom to symbolize the universe developing across ever-smaller scales.

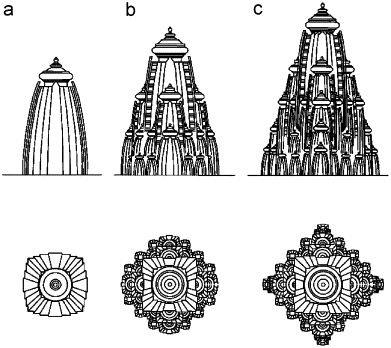
Hindu temples feature self-similar, fractal-like structures, where parts resemble the whole.

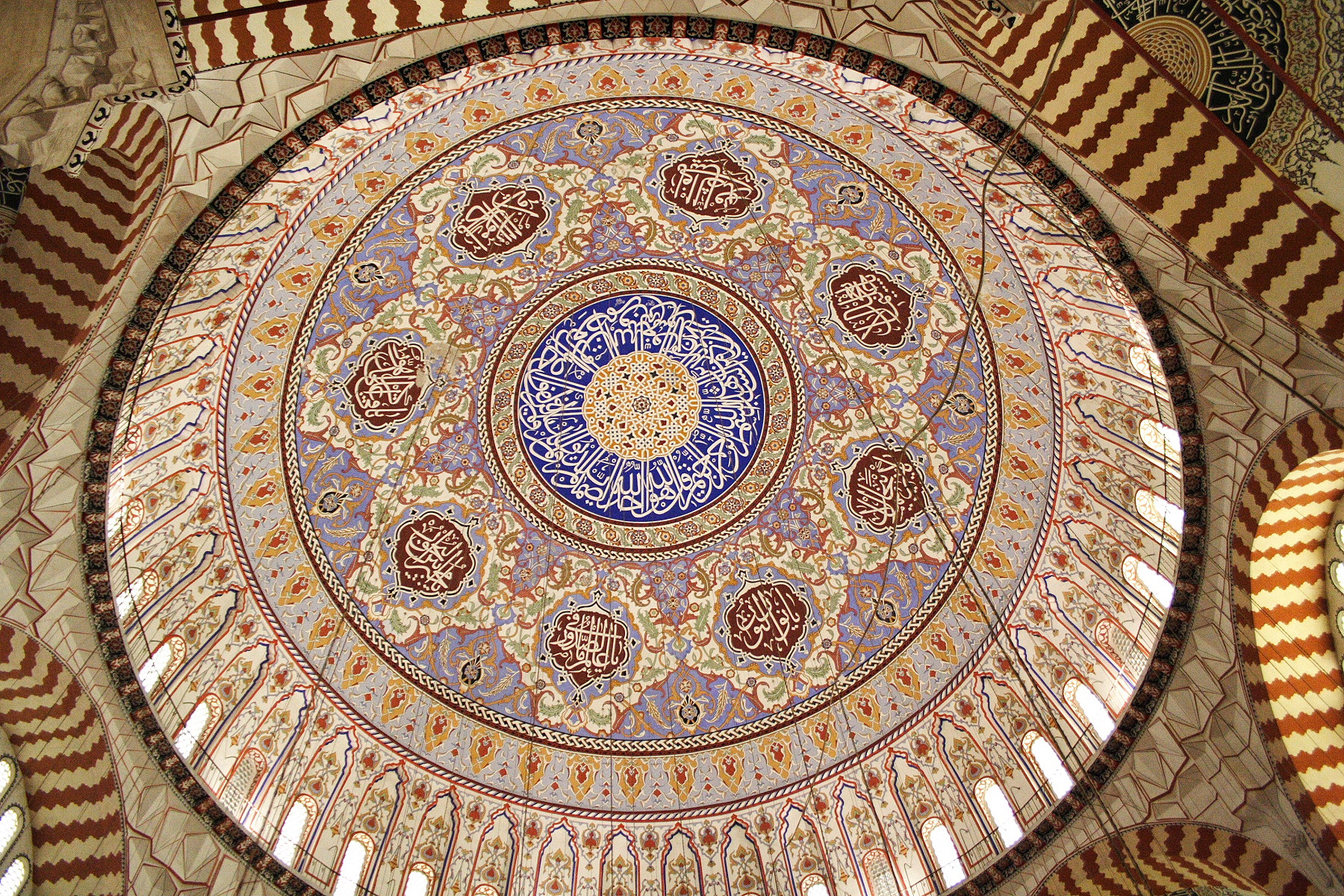
Islamic geometric patterns are reminiscent of fractal art, as on the main dome of Selimiye Mosque in Edirne, Turkey, with self-similar patterns.

Fractal art is a form of algorithmic art created by calculating fractal objects and representing the calculation results as still digital images, animations, and media. Fractal art developed from the mid-1980s onwards. It is a genre of computer art and digital art which are part of new media art. The mathematical beauty of fractals lies at the intersection of generative art and computer art. They combine to produce a type of abstract art.

Fractal art (especially in the western world) is rarely drawn or painted by hand. It is usually created indirectly with the assistance of fractal-generating software, iterating through three phases: setting parameters of appropriate fractal software; executing the possibly lengthy calculation; and evaluating the product. In some cases, other graphics programs are used to further modify the images produced. This is called post-processing. Non-fractal imagery may also be integrated into the artwork. The Julia set and Mandelbrot sets can be considered as icons of fractal art.

It was assumed that fractal art could not have developed without computers because of the calculative capabilities they provide. Fractals are generated by applying iterative methods to solving non-linear equations or polynomial equations. Fractals are any of various extremely irregular curves or shapes for which any suitably chosen part is similar in shape to a given larger or smaller part when magnified or reduced to the same size.

== Types ==
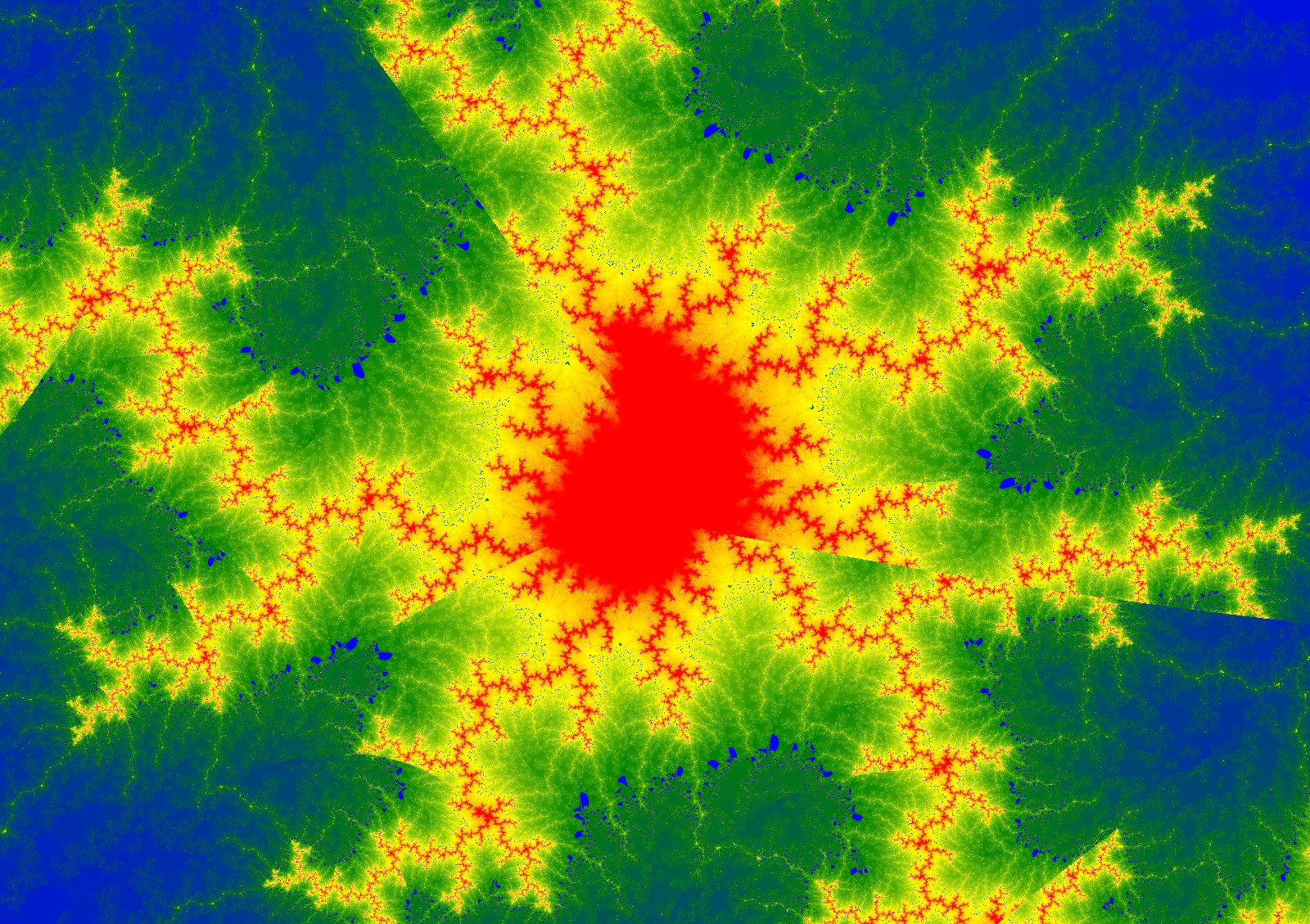
A detail from a non-integer Multibrot set

There are many different kinds of fractal images. They can be subdivided into several groups.

- Fractals derived from standard geometry by using iterative transformations on an initial common figure like a straight line (the Cantor dust or the von Koch curve), a triangle (the Sierpinski triangle), or a cube (the Menger sponge). The first fractal figures invented near the end of the 19th and early 20th centuries belong to this group.
- IFS (iterated function systems)
- Strange attractors
- Fractal flame
- L-system fractals
- Fractals created by the iteration of complex polynomials.
- Newton fractals, including Nova fractals
- Fractals generated over quaternions and other Cayley-Dickson algebras
- Fractal terrains generated by random fractal processes
- Mandelbulbs are a form of three dimensional fractal.

Fractal Expressionism is a term used to differentiate traditional visual art that incorporates fractal elements such as self-similarity for example. Perhaps the best example of fractal expressionism is found in Jackson Pollock's dripped patterns. They have been analysed and found to contain a fractal dimension which has been attributed to his technique.

== Techniques ==
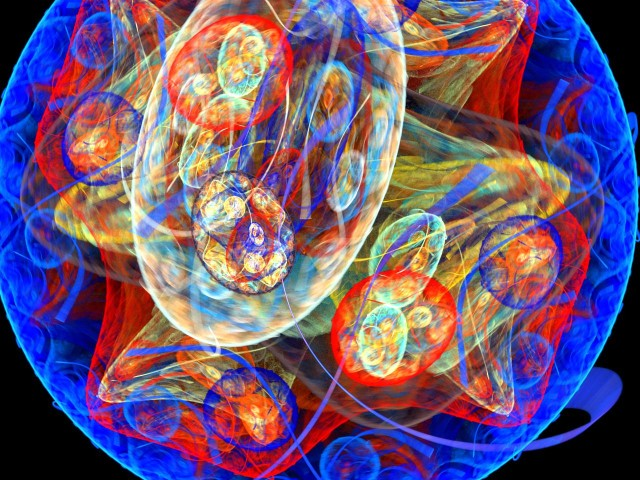
Fractal image generated by Electric Sheep

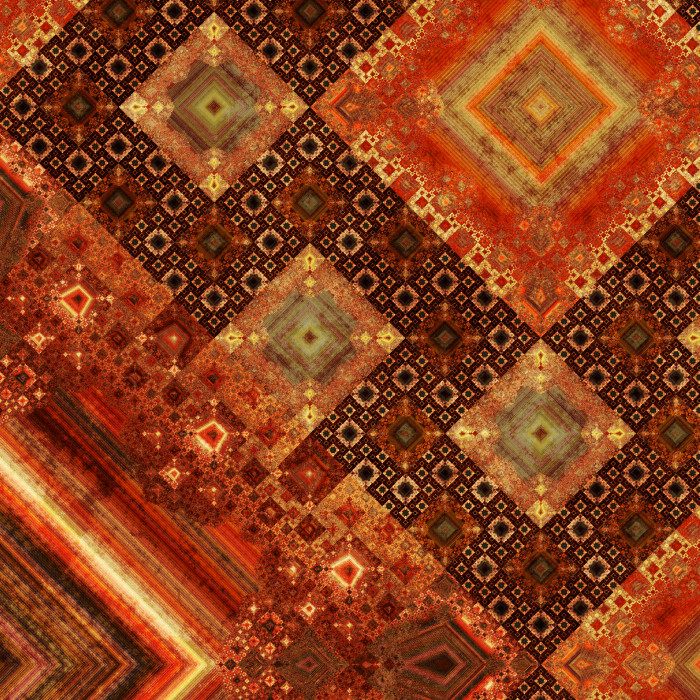
A Fibonacci word fractal

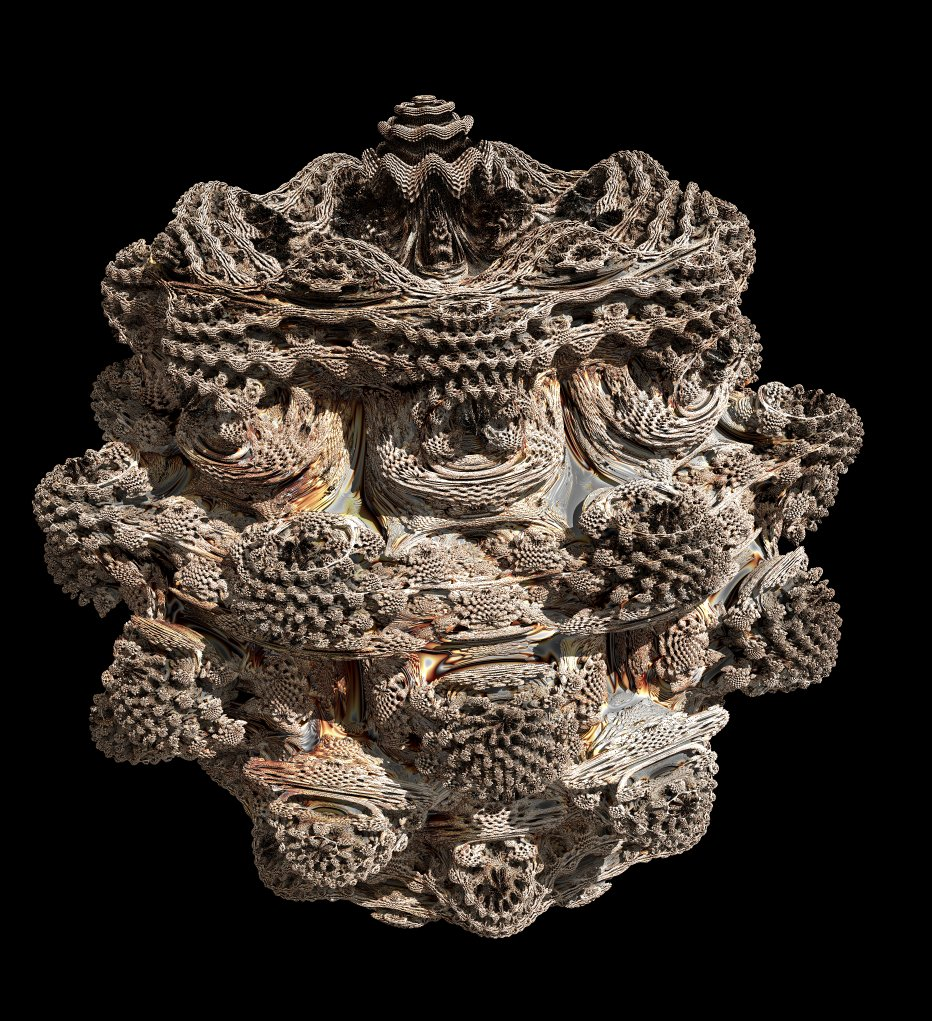
A 3D Mandelbulb fractal generated using Visions of Chaos

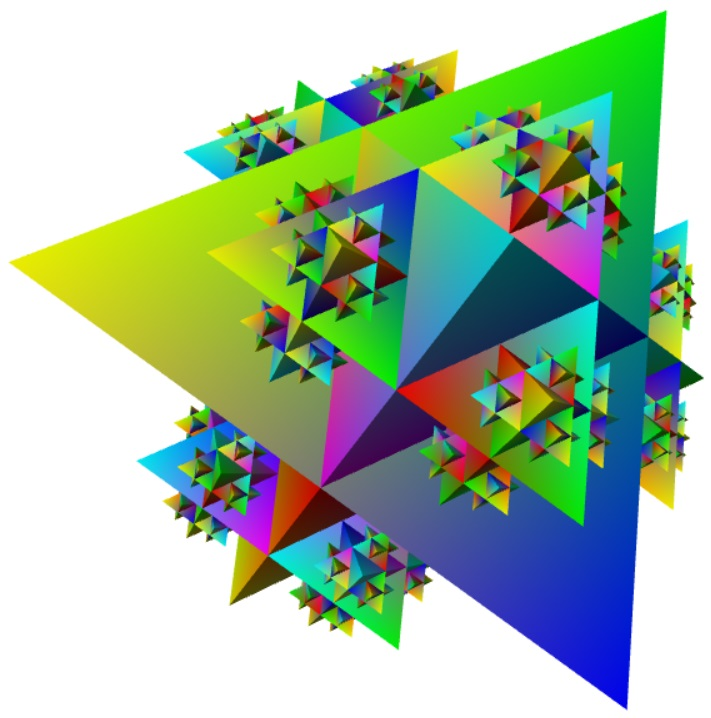
3D fractal fantasy generated using LAI4D

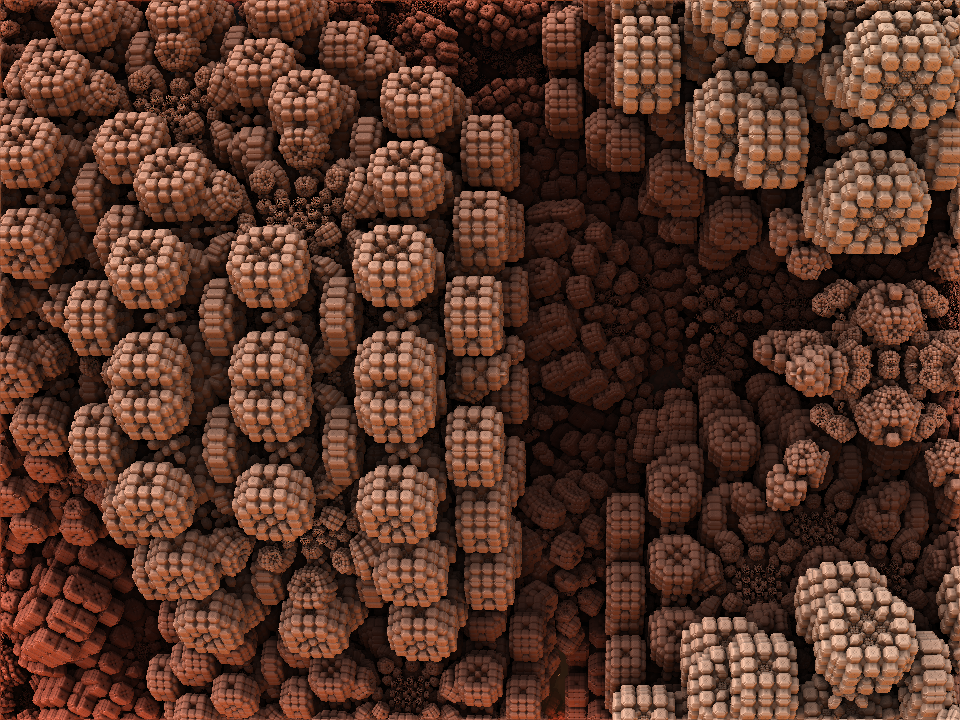
A piece generated by Mandelbulb3D.

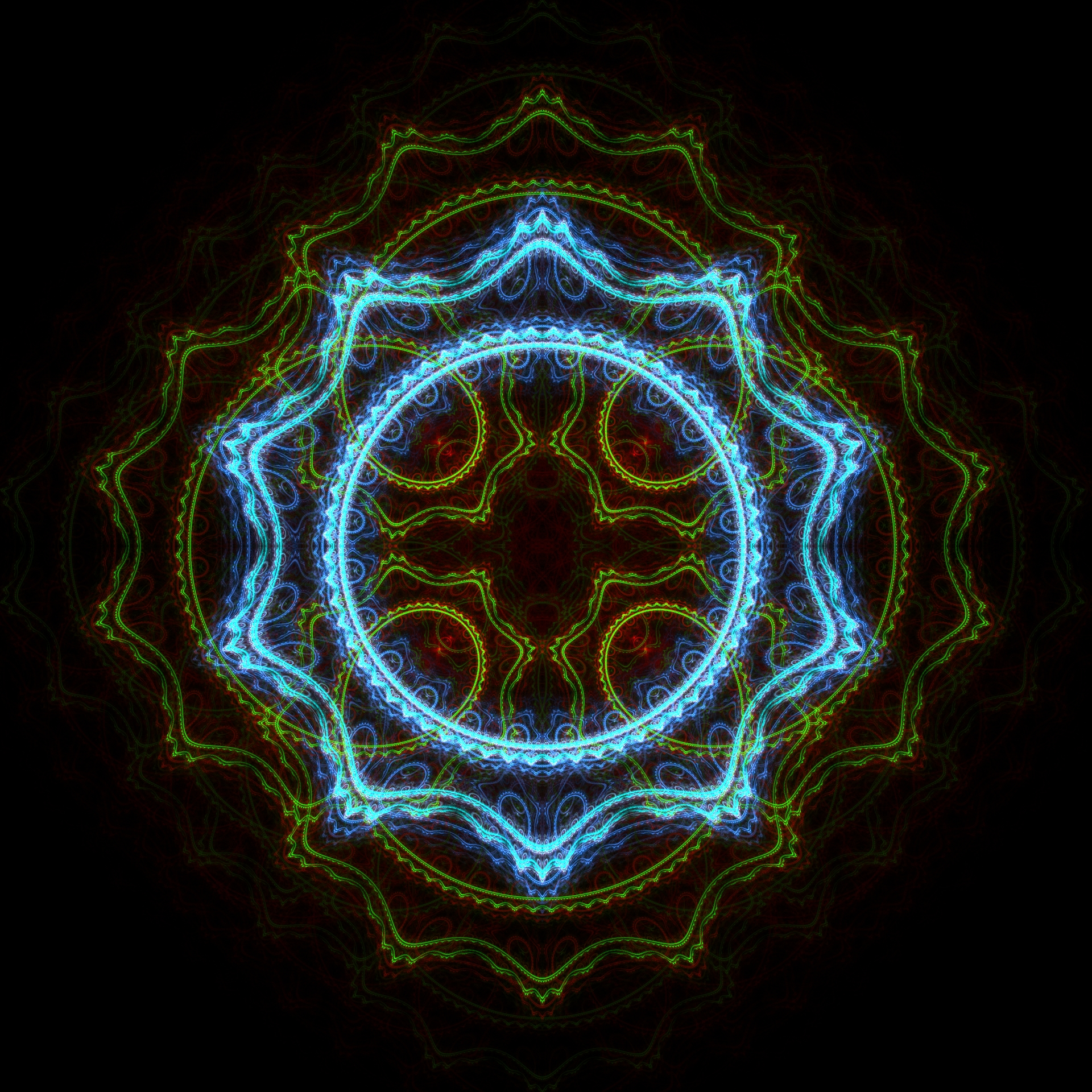
A piece generated in Apophysis

Fractals of all kinds have been used as the basis for digital art and animation. High resolution color graphics became increasingly available at scientific research labs in the mid-1980s. Scientific forms of art, including fractal art, have developed separately from mainstream culture. Starting with 2-dimensional details of fractals, such as the Mandelbrot Set, fractals have found artistic application in fields as varied as texture generation, plant growth simulation, and landscape generation.

Fractals are sometimes combined with evolutionary algorithms, either by iteratively choosing good-looking specimens in a set of random variations of a fractal artwork and producing new variations, to avoid dealing with cumbersome or unpredictable parameters, or collectively, as in the Electric Sheep project, where people use fractal flames rendered with distributed computing as their screensaver and "rate" the flame they are viewing, influencing the server, which reduces the traits of the undesirables, and increases those of the desirables to produce a computer-generated, community-created piece of art.

Many fractal images are admired because of their perceived harmony. This is typically achieved by the patterns which emerge from the balance of order and chaos. Similar qualities have been described in Chinese painting and miniature trees and rockeries.

== Landscapes ==
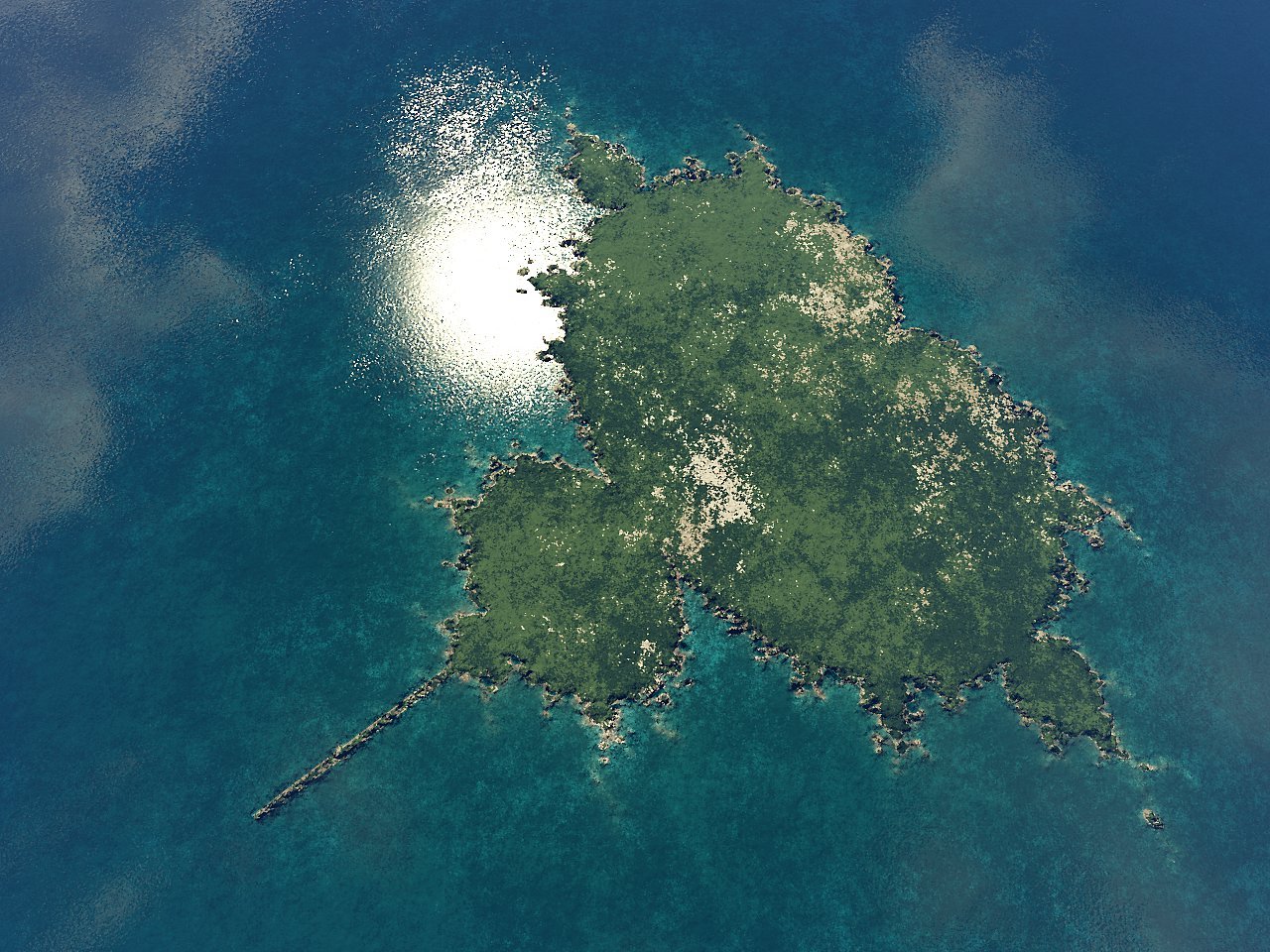
A 3D landscape generated with Terragen, using the Mandelbrot set

The first fractal image that was intended to be a work of art was probably the famous one on the cover of Scientific American, August 1985. This image showed a landscape formed from the potential function on the domain outside the (usual) Mandelbrot set. However, as the potential function grows fast near the boundary of the Mandelbrot set, it was necessary for the creator to let the landscape grow downwards, so that it looked as if the Mandelbrot set was a plateau atop a mountain with steep sides. The same technique was used a year after in some images in The Beauty of Fractals by Heinz-Otto Peitgen and Michael M. Richter. They provide a formula to estimate the distance from a point outside the Mandelbrot set to the boundary of the Mandelbrot set (and a similar formula for the Julia sets). Landscapes can, for example, be formed from the distance function for a family of iterations of the form $z^{2} + az^{4} + c$.

== Artists ==
Notable fractal artists include Desmond Paul Henry, Hamid Naderi Yeganeh, and musician Bruno Degazio. British artists include William Latham, who has used fractal geometry and other computer graphics techniques in his works. and Vienna Forrester who creates flame fractal art using data extracted from her photographs. Greg Sams has used fractal designs in postcards, T-shirts, and textiles. American Vicky Brago-Mitchell has created fractal art which has appeared in exhibitions and on magazine covers. Scott Draves is credited with inventing flame fractals. Carlos Ginzburg has explored fractal art and developed a concept called "homo fractalus" which is based around the idea that the human is the ultimate fractal. Merrin Parkers from New Zealand specialises in fractal art. Kerry Mitchell wrote a "Fractal Art Manifesto", claiming that. In Italy, the artist Giorgio Orefice wrote the "Fractalism" manifesto, founding a Fractalism cultural mouvement in 1999.

Fractal Art is a subclass of two-dimensional visual art, and is in many respects similar to photography—another art form that was greeted by skepticism upon its arrival. Fractal images typically are manifested as prints, bringing fractal artists into the company of painters, photographers, and printmakers. Fractals exist natively as electronic images. This is a format that traditional visual artists are quickly embracing, bringing them into Fractal Art's digital realm. Generating fractals can be an artistic endeavor, a mathematical pursuit, or just a soothing diversion. However, Fractal Art is clearly distinguished from other digital activities by what it is, and by what it is not.

According to Mitchell, fractal art is not computerized art, lacking in rules, unpredictable, nor something that any person with access to a computer can do well. Instead, fractal art is expressive, creative, and requires input, effort, and intelligence. Most importantly, "fractal art is simply that which is created by Fractal Artists: ART."

American artist Hal Tenny was hired to design environment in the 2017 film Guardians of the Galaxy Vol. 2. There has also been a surge in fractal art distributed via Non-fungible tokens - such as work listed by Fractal_Dimensions, spectral.haus, and NetMetropolis.

== Exhibits ==
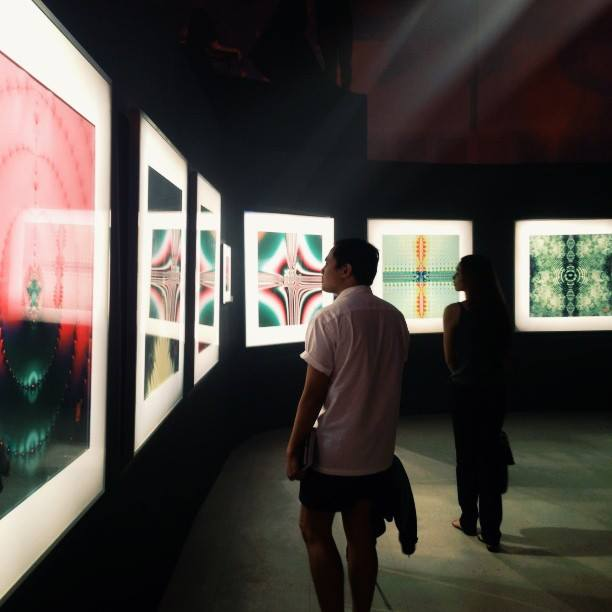
Fractal art exhibition, 2013

Fractal art has been exhibited at major international art galleries. One of the first exhibitions of fractal art was "Map Art", a travelling exhibition of works from researchers at the University of Bremen. Mathematicians Heinz-Otto Peitgen and Michael M. Richter discovered that the public not only found the images aesthetically pleasing but that they also wanted to understand the scientific background to the images.

In 1989, fractals were part of the subject matter for an art show called Strange Attractors: Signs of Chaos at the New Museum of Contemporary Art. The show consisted of photographs, installations and sculptures designed to provide greater scientific discourse to the field which had already captured the public's attention through colourful and intricate computer imagery.

In 2014, emerging British fractal artist Vienna Forrester created an exhibition held at the I-node of the Planetary Collegium, Kefalonia, entitled "IO. Fragmented Myths and Memories: A Fractal Exploration of Kefalonia", part of the 2013–14 international arts festival "Stone Kingdom Kefalonia" commemorating the devastating 1953 Ionian earthquake. Her works were created by using geographical coordinates and photographs from parts of the island which still bear the scars.

== Artworks ==
"Global Forest" artwork is based on a study highlighting the aesthetic and physiological impacts of fractal patterns. Fractals, patterns found universally in nature, repeat self-similarly across scales, with the complexity and aesthetic perception determined by their recursion and dimension rate. Notably, these patterns are featured in art across various cultures, including Jackson Pollock's paintings, eliciting strong aesthetic reactions. Moreover, incorporating fractals in architectural designs can mitigate visual strain and discomfort caused by Euclidean spaces and even reduce stress, resonating with the biophilic idea of humans' innate connection to nature. The ScienceDesignLab collaborated with the Mohawk Group to integrate these findings, producing award-winning "Relaxing Floors" that use fractal patterns, hypothesizing their therapeutic effects stem from nature's soothing visuals.

== See also ==
- Batik
- Fractal curve
- Greeble
- List of mathematical art software
- Mathematics and architecture
- Persian carpet
- Psychedelic art
- Systems art
- Infinite compositions of analytic functions
