= Software art =

Creative works relying on the executive functions of computers to provoke emotions

Software art is a work of art where the creation of software, or concepts from software, play an important role; for example software applications which were created by artists and which were intended as artworks. As an artistic discipline software art has attained growing attention since the late 1990s. It is closely related to Internet art since it often relies on the Internet, most notably the World Wide Web, for dissemination and critical discussion of the works. Art festivals such as FILE Electronic Language International Festival (São Paulo), Transmediale (Berlin), Prix Ars Electronica (Linz) and readme (Moscow, Helsinki, Aarhus, and Dortmund) have devoted considerable attention to the medium and through this have helped to bring software art to a wider audience of theorists and academics.

== Selection of artists and works ==
- Scott Draves is best known for creating the Electric Sheep program in 1999, the Bomb visual-musical instrument in 1995, and the Fractal flame algorithm in 1992.
- Robert B. Lisek is the creator of NEST, a software made to find hidden patterns and links between people, groups, objects, events and places, based on LANL's and GRU's antiterrorist software.
- Bob Holmes is an artist who creates websites that are signed, exhibited and sold in galleries and Museums as autonomous artworks.
- Netochka Nezvanova is the author of nebula.m81, an experimental web browser awarded at Transmediale 2001 in the category "artistic software". She is also the creator of the highly influential nato.0+55+3d software suite for live video manipulation.
- Marc Lee is an artist who focuses on software art, awarded in the categories "Interaction" and "Software" at Transmediale 2002 and won Viper International awards 2002 and 2005.
- Jason Salavon is known for the creation of "amalgamations" that average dozens of images to create individual, ethereal "archetype" images.
- Alexei Shulgin is well known for his performance group 386DX and is also credited with early software art-inspired creations.
- Adrian Ward has won several awards for his Signwave Auto-Illustrator, a generative art graphic design application, which parodies Adobe Photoshop.
- Martin Wattenberg is one of the pioneers of data visualization art, creating works based on music, photographs, and even Wikipedia edits.
- Corby & Baily were early experimenters in this field, producers of the reconnoitre web browser which won an honorary mention in the net art section of Ars Electronica in 1999.
- LIA is one of the early pioneers of Software and Net Art. Her website, re-move.org (1999–2003) received an Award of Distinction in the Net Vision/Net Excellence Category of Ars Electronica in 2003.

== See also ==
- Art game, a specialized form of playable software art
- Demoscene
- Internet art, a related form of art
- Digital art
- Computer art, a related form of art
