= Lisek =

Lisek may refer to:

- Lísek, a municipality and village in the Czech Republic
- Lisek, Kuyavian-Pomeranian Voivodeship, a village in Poland
- Lisek (surname)
