= Michael Richter =

Michael Richter may refer to:

- Michael M. Richter (1938–2020), German mathematician
- Mike Richter (born 1966), American hockey player
