= Corby & Baily =

English artist duo

Tom Corby (born 1966) and Gavin Baily (1970) are two London based artists who work collaboratively using public domain data, climate models, satellite imagery and the Internet. Recent work has focused on climate change and its relationship to technology and has involved collaborations with scientists working at the British Antarctic Survey. Corby and Baily are founder members (along with Jonathan Mackenzie) of the Atmospheric Research Collective, an experimental artist group which works in collaboration with climate scientists. For an overview of recent works see "An interview with artist and writer Tom Corby".

Tom Corby is an artist and former Professor of art at Central Saint Martins, University of the Arts. Gavin Baily is an artist and software developer.

== Awards ==
Their work has won a number of awards including: nomination for the File Prix Lux and the File Electronic Language Festival 2010; the jury nominated award at the 10th Japan Media Arts Festival in 2007; honorary mentions at the Prix Ars Electronica 2006 and 2000; honorary mention: "The Post-Cagian Interactive", "Art on the Net" The Machida City Museum of Graphic Arts, Tokyo and the main festival prize COMTEC ART 1999. In 2000 they were nominated for the "International Media Art Award 2000", at Zentrum fur Kunst und Medientechnologie (ZKM) in Karlsruhe, Germany and were artists in residence at the ICA London 1998.

== Exhibitions and Reviews ==
Corby and Baily's work has been exhibited and featured at the ICA in London, Victoria and Albert Museum, Tate Online, the Madrid Art Fair Arco 2001, NTT InterCommunication Center (ICC) and media art festivals including the Inter-Society for the Electronic Arts (ISEA), Transmediale, and Urban Screens. Reviews include: Art Review 2009,, La Repubblica 2010, The Guardian 2011, Neural IT 2009, Art Monthly 2007, Artist's Newsletter 2006 and De:Bug 2002.

== Published writings ==
- 2011: "Systemness: toward a data aesthetics of climate change”, in Far Field: Digital Culture, Climate Change and the Poles (eds), Marsching JD and Polli A., London: Intellect.
- 2010: “Myriad couplings: toward an information aesthetics of climate change”, media-N Journal, Vol. 7, No. 2, (Spring 2010).
- 2008 “Landscapes of feeling, arenas of action: information visualisation as art practice”, Leonardo Vol. 41, No. 5, (October 2008).
- 2007: “Cyclone.soc: an Interactive Artwork Visualising Internet Newsgroup Postings as Cyclonic Weather Conditions”, Journal of Visualisation Japan, Vol. 10, No. 4, (2007) 338.
- 2005: Corby T. (ed.) Network Art: Practices and Positions, London: Routledge. [Edited volume]
- 2003: Corby T. "Gameboy UltraF_uk" Novas Medias (New Medias) Symposium Proceedings 'File 2003.
- 2000: Reconnoitre", Net Art Guide, Fraunhofer Institute ?: Stuttgart, 2000, pp. 214–216 (ISBN 3-8167-5590-9).
- 1997: ICA lecture “Building the Cybercity”, ICA Audio tape, London: ICA;
- 2006: “Extra-Ordinary Practices”, essay, exhibition catalogue for Extra-Ordinary Practices: A Retrospective of British Media Art, Kunsthaus Dresden, pp. 53–64 (ISBN 3981024729).
- 2006: “New+Media+Arts: Developments in Computer Based Arts” essay, pp. 167–169 exhibition catalogue for Extra-Ordinary Practices: A Retrospective of British Media Art.

== Bibliography ==
- Ecology Now, Andrew Brown (2014, Thames and Hudson);
- Weather as Medium, Janine Randerson (MIT Press, 2018);
- The Tate Guide to Modern Art Terms, Simon Wilson et al, (London: Tate Publishing, 2008);
- Museum and Archive on the Move; Oliver Grau and Walter de Gruyter (GmbH & Co KG 2017);
- Handbook on the Politics of Antarctica, Klaus Dodds, Alan D. Hemmings, Peder Roberts (Edward Elgar Publishing, 27 Jan 2017);
- ‘Digital Aesthetics’ Sean Cubitt in Christiane Paul (ed), A Companion to Digital Art, (2014, Blackwell, New York)’
- ‘The Earth Sciences and Creative Practice’ Suzette Worden in Dew Harrison (ed), Handbook of Research on Digital Media and Creative Technologies (GI Global, 2015)
- ‘Art imagination and Environment’ Tim Collins in Peter Howard, Ian Thompson, Emma Waterton (eds.), The Routledge Companion to Landscape Studies (London: Routledge 2013);
- Mobile Interface Theory: Embodied Space and Locative Media, Jason Farman (London: Routledge 2013);
- The Fundamentals of Digital Art, Richard Colson (2007, Ava Publishing);
- Net.art 2.0, Tilman Baumgartel (2002, Nurnberg: Insititut fur moderne Kunst).
- S Albert, “Useless Utilities” in New Media Art: Practice and Context in the UK 1994–2004 (ed) L Kimbell Arts Council England/Cornerhouse, 2004.
- J Rosa Press, “Fire to Start”, Journal de Letras Artes e Ideias, no16 (Italy), 2002.
- M Bittanti “[Fuori gioco]. Sconfinamenti videoludici," in Per una cultura dei videogames. Teorie e prassi del videogiocare, Milano: Unicopli, (Italy), 2002.
- S Healy, “Software triffl Kunst im 'Gameboy_ultraF_uk”, DEBUG magazine no 60 (Germany) 2002.
- T Baumgaertel “Unheil auf dem Desktop”, Telepolis, (German text), [Internet], <http://www.heise.de/tp/deutsch/inhalt/sa/7091/1.html> 2001.
- S Bury "Artists' Books: e books", Art Monthly, Nov. no. 241. 2000.
- T Baumgaertel “Experimental software”, ACOUSTIC.SPACE, no. 3, net.audio
- issue, 2000.
- Stocker G. and Schöpf C. (eds.), Next Sex: Sex in the Age of Procreative Superfluousness, Ars Electronica 2000, Vienna: Springer-Verlag, p. 408, 2000.
- B Weil "Readme.txt Browsing online art. An exploration of various directions in networked art projects" [Internet], Museo de Monterrey: https://web.archive.org/web/20080418013454/http://www.museodemonterrey.org.mx/english/mediateca/tours/docs/weil/index.html> 1999.
