= Lisek (surname) =

Polish surname derived from nickname meaning "little fox", for a cunning, treacherous person.

- Krzysztof Lisek (born 1967), Polish politician
- Piotr Lisek (born 1992), Polish pole vaulter
- Robert B. Lisek, Polish artist and mathematician
