= Lísek =

- Municipality
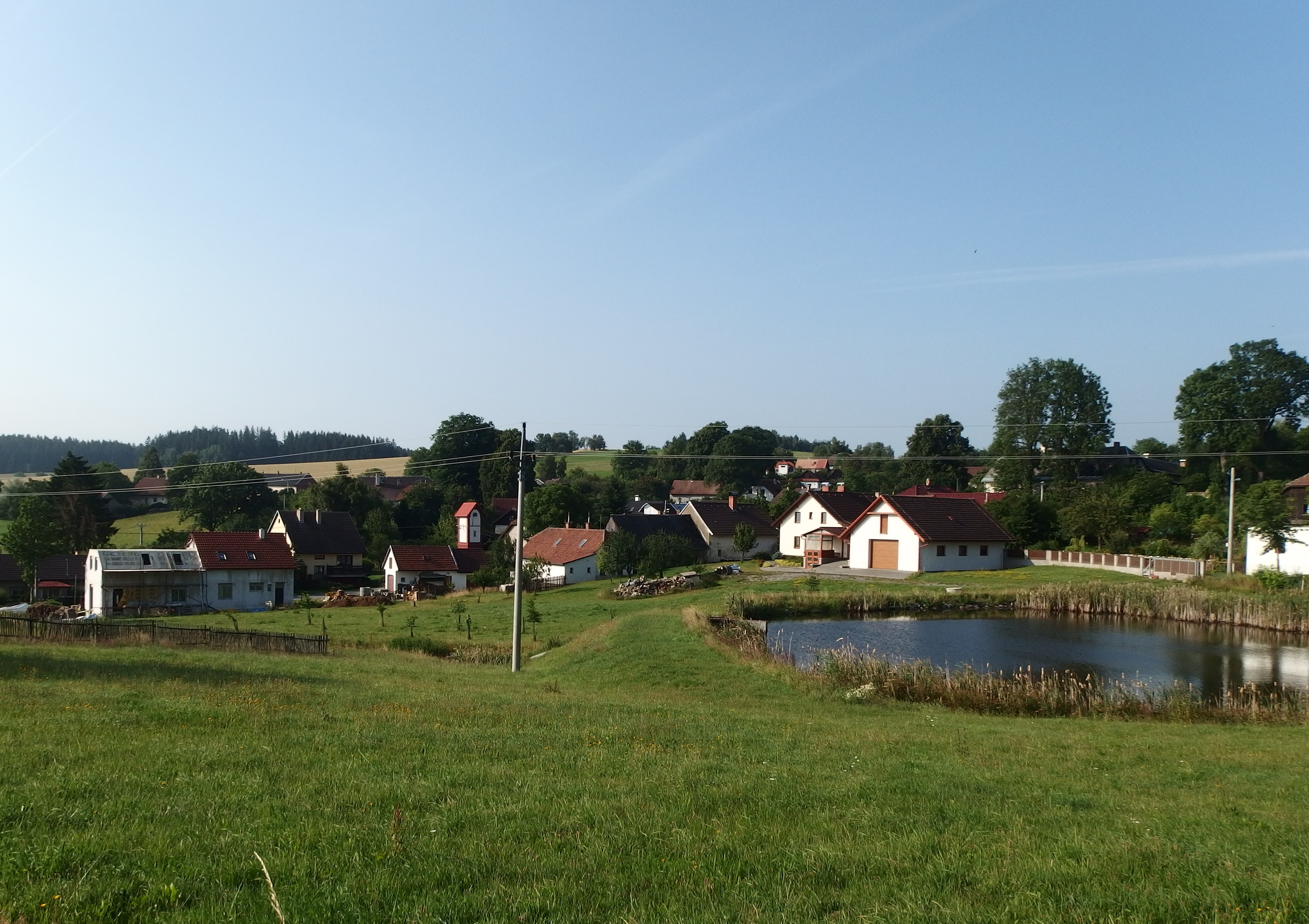
- Vojtěchov, a part of Lísek

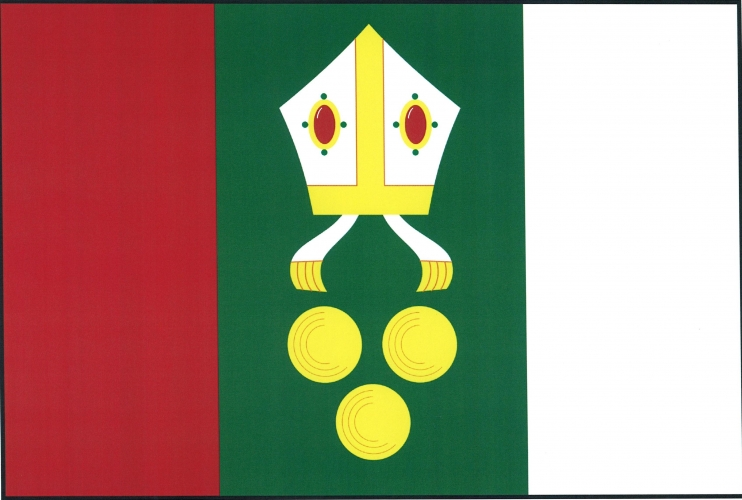
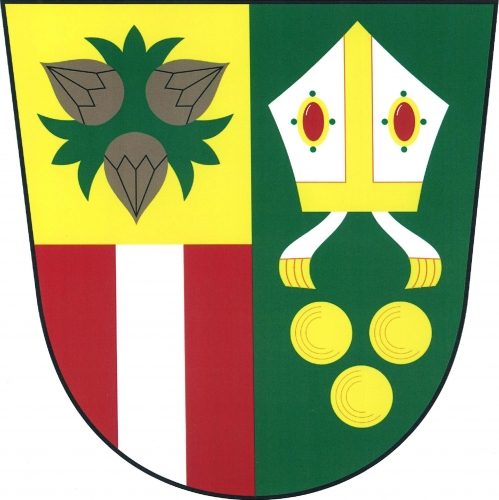
- Flag Coat of arms

- Location in the Czech Republic
- Coordinates: 49°35′13″N 16°12′4″E
- Country: Czech Republic
- Region: Vysočina
- District: Žďár nad Sázavou
- First mentioned: 1360

Area
  - Total: 16.71 km^{2} (6.45 sq mi)
- Elevation: 663 m (2,175 ft)

Population (2026-01-01)
  - Total: 352
  - Density: 21.1/km^{2} (54.6/sq mi)
- Time zone: UTC+1 (CET)
  - Summer (DST): UTC+2 (CEST)
- Postal codes: 592 45, 593 01
- Website: www.lisek.cz

Lísek (until 1951 Lhota) is a municipality and village in Žďár nad Sázavou District in the Vysočina Region of the Czech Republic. It has about 400 inhabitants.

== Administrative division ==
Lísek consists of three municipal parts (in brackets population according to the 2021 census):

- Lísek (7)
- Lhota (364)
- Vojtěchov (21)

== Etymology ==
The village of Lísek was founded on the site of a forest called Lísek. The name is derived from the Czech word líska, meaning 'hazel'.

== Geography ==
Lísek is located about 19 kilometres (12 mi) east of Žďár nad Sázavou and 50 km (31 mi) northwest of Brno. It lies in the Upper Svratka Highlands. The highest point is the hill Samotín at 773 m (2,536 ft) above sea level. The Bystřice Stream (a tributary of the Svratka) originates here and flows across the municipal territory.

== History ==
The first written mention of Lhota is from 1360. The village initially belonged to the Pyšolec estate, then to the Pernštejn estate and after 1588 to the Bystřice estate.

In 1951, the small village of Lísek (originally a municipal part of Velké Janovice) was annexed to the municipality and the entire municipality was renamed Lísek, because Lhota is a common Czech toponym and confusions occurred.

== Demographics ==
Historical population

Year	Pop.	±%
1869	729	—
1880	721	−1.1%
1890	715	−0.8%
1900	741	+3.6%
1910	744	+0.4%

Year	Pop.	±%
1921	739	−0.7%
1930	628	−15.0%
1950	452	−28.0%
1961	464	+2.7%
1970	399	−14.0%

Year	Pop.	±%
1980	385	−3.5%
1991	374	−2.9%
2001	366	−2.1%
2011	374	+2.2%
2021	392	+4.8%

Source: Censuses

== Transport ==
There are no railways or major roads passing through the municipality.

== Sights ==
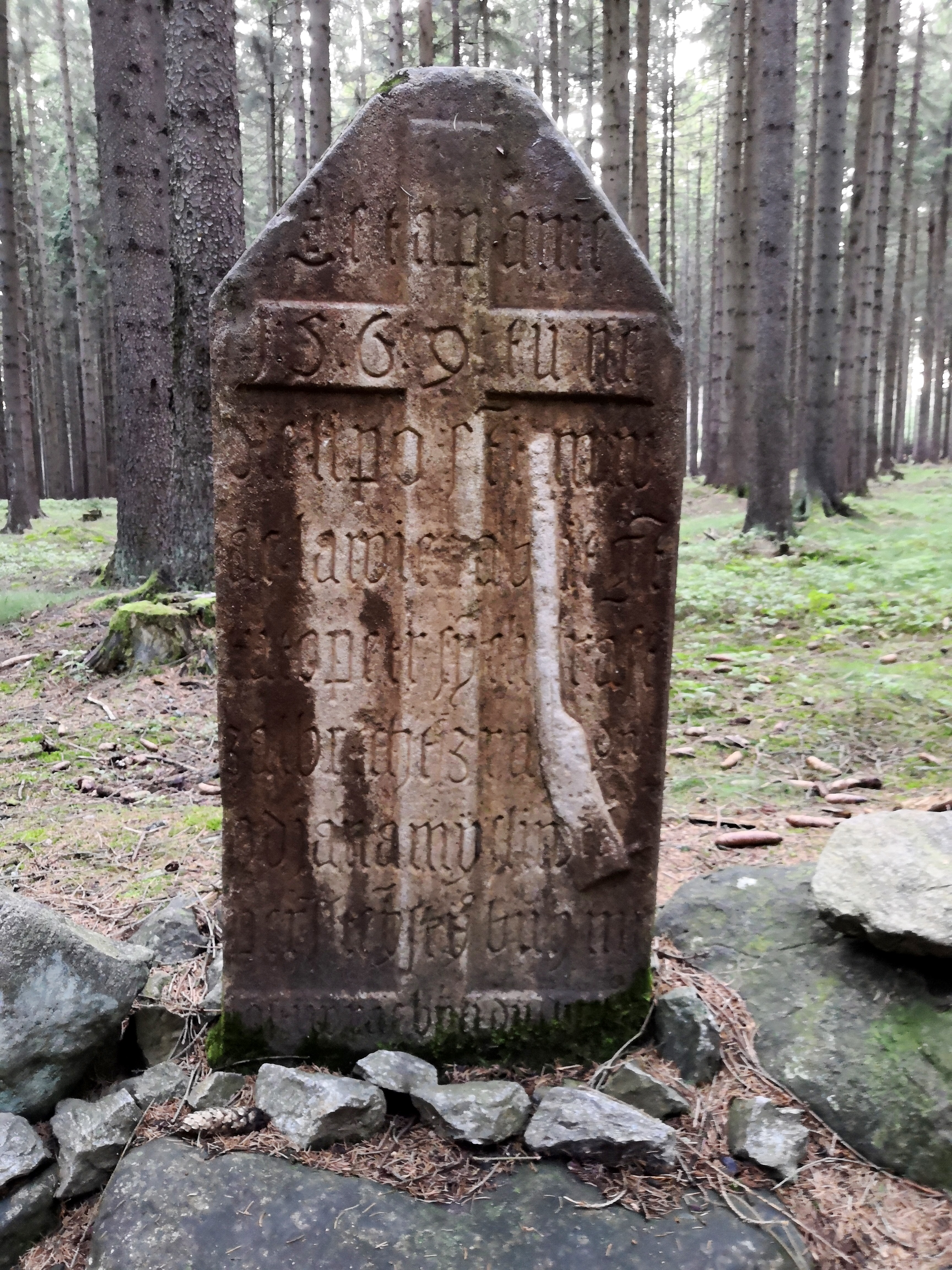
U Pytláka stone cross

The only protected cultural monument in the municipality is a conciliation cross called U Pytláka. It commemorates a violent event of 1569, when a gamekeeper shot a poacher. It is valuable for its unusual workmanship and high degree of preservation.

The main landmark of Lísek is the Church of Saint Nicholas. It was built in the Empire style in 1846–1852. It replaced an older church, which stood in the middle of the cemetery and was demolished after the countruction of the new church.
