= Carlos Ginzburg =

Argentinean artist and theoretician

- Born: 1946 (age 79–80); La Plata, Argentina
- Known for: Artist
- Movement: World art

Carlos Ginzburg is a conceptual artist and theoretician born in 1946 in La Plata, Argentina. He studied philosophy and social theory.

== Biography ==
Germano Celant, when writing about Arte Povera, invited Ginzburg by letter to join his movement.

As a conceptual artist interested in digital art, fractals chaos and fractal art, Ginzburg created what he calls "homo fractalus" – a concept about microcosm totality.

He has worked with the art critic Pierre Restany (with whom he developed the concept of "Political Ecology") and with Severo Sarduy who put him near Hokusai in "Barroco", one of the reference's books to Le Pli of Gilles Deleuze.

He has lived in Paris and since 2005 works with the French art critic and artist Allaïa Tschann.

== Exhibition ==
Personal exhibition

- 2011 Jerusalem Cross and Bis, 3e Rue, Paris, France
- 2004 Susan Conde Gallery, New York
- 2002 Galerie Lina Davidov, Paris, France
- 1999 Galerie Lina Davidov, Paris, France
- 1997 Galerie Mabel Semmler, Paris, France
- 1980 I.C.C, Antwerpen, Belgium
- 1978 Galerie Studio 16, Turin, Italy
- 1977 Ecole sociologique interrogative, Paris, France

Collectival exhibition

- September 2010 Henrique Faria Fine Art, New York
- October 2009 Museo Nacional Reina Sofia, Madrid, Spain
- May–August 2009 Württembergischer Kunstvereim, Stuttgart, Germany
- 2005 Slought Fondation, Philadelphie, USA
- 2002 J. Wayne Stark Galleries, University Center Galleries, Texas A&M University
- 2001 White Box Gallery, New York
- 1999 Espace Electra, Paris, France
- 1999 Abbeye de Roncereis, Angers, France
- 1997 Espace Paul Ricard, Paris, France
- 1996 Gallery of Art, University of Georgia, Athens, Georgia
- 1995 Galerie Arx, Turin, Italy
- 1994 Foundation, T.Z. Art & Co Gallery, Mai, New York
- 1993 Institut National des Sciences Appliquées de Lyon
- 1991 Foundation Battistoni, Paris, France
- 1990 Ezra and Cecile Zilka Gallery, Middletown
- 1989 Kaos Foundation, Chicago, Illinois
- 1987 Ocre d'art, Châteauroux, France
- 1983 Centre Georges Pompidou, Petit Forum, Paris, France
- 1980 Fashion Moda, New York
- 1975 Moderna Musee, Stockholm
- 1973 I.., Antwerpen, Belgium
- 1972 International Meeting of Arts, Pamplona, Spain
- 1971 Musée d'art moderne, Buenos Aires
- 1971 Camden Art Center, Londres
- ...

== Official collection ==
- Reina Sofia Museum. 2010
- French national fonds of contemporary Art. 1988&1990
- Tate modern
- Centre Georges Pompidou

== Conferences ==
- Université Paris VIII
- Université des Andes, Bogotá, Colombia
- École des Beaux-Arts d'Annecy
- École des Beaux-Arts de Mulhouse
- Faculté d'architecture de Venise, Italy
- Centre Georges Pompidou, Paris
- School of Visual Arts, New York
- École des Beaux-Arts de Caen

== Bibliography ==
Pascale LE THOREL-DAVIOT

- Nouveau dictionnaire des artistes contemporains, Larousse.

Gillo Dorfles

- 1976 Ultima Tendenze dell'Arte d'Oggi, Milano, Italy
- 1975 Del Significado a las Opciones, Madrid, Spain
- Dall Significado alle Scelte, Turin, Italy
- 1972 Corriere de la Sera, Milano, Italy

Pierre Restany

- 1996 Journal of Contemporary Art, Vol. 7-2, New York
- 1990 Arte e Produzione, Italy
- 1990 60/90, Ed. De la Difference, Paris, France
- 1989, Revue Kanal, Paris, France
- ...
- 1980, Voyages de Ginzburg, Paris, France

Severo Sarduy

- 1992 Revue Art Press, Paris, France
- 1991 Barroco Ed. du Seuil, Paris, France
- 1989 Journal El Colombiano, Colombia
- 1984 Revue Artinf, Buenos Aires, Argentine
- 1983 Revue Art Press, Paris, France

Severo Sarduy et Klaus Ottman

- 1990 Revue Art Press, Paris, France

Tim Jacobs

- 1989, Journal New City, Chicago, Illinois

Jean-Claude Chirollet (philosophe, esthéticien, spécialiste de l'art fractaliste, Université de Strasbourg):

- 1992, "Images fractales : biogénétique des images en restructuration continue", in Les Figures de la Forme, éd. L'Harmattan, Paris, p. 283-295
- 1994, "En quel sens peut-on parler d'une Esthétique fractaliste?", in Littérature et Théorie du Chaos, éd. Presses Universitaires de Vincenne, Université Paris VIII, France, p. 115-140
- 1998, Carlos Ginzburg – La complexité autoréférentielle du Sujet fractal, revue La Mazarine,

éd. du Treize Mars, Paris, septembre 1998, p. 112-114

- 2002, "L’Approche de l'art d'un point de vue fractaliste", in Revue Tangence, numéro 69, été 2002,

Université du Québec, p. 103-132.

- 2005, "Art fractaliste - La Complexité du Regard", éditions L'Harmattan, coll. Champs Visuels (www.librairieharmattan.com), Paris, France (Livre-synthèse sur les arts fractalistes depuis les années 1980. Nombreuses références à l'oeuvre et à la conception fractaliste de Carlos Ginzburg)

Paul Ardenne

- 1997, Art, l'Age Contemporain, Ed. du Regard, France

== Press ==
- 1999
1. Figaro magazine, 24 avril, France
2. Journal le Monde, 16 mars, France
3. Revue Beaux Arts Magazine, Identités, Mars, Paris, France
4. Revue TechniArt, Mai, Paris, France
5. Revue Cimaise, Mars, Paris, France
- 1998
1. Revue Paris Match, Janvier, France
2. Revue Science et Avenir, Janvier, France
- 1997
1. Le Monde, 29 Nov, France
2. Revue TechniArt, n°17, France

== Articles and text of Carlos Ginzburg ==
- 1999 Revue Art Press, n°244, Mars, Paris, France
- 1997 Revue Art Press, n°229, Nov, Paris, France
- 1995 Revue Archipielago, Madrid, Spain
- 1993 Art Forum, Mars, New York
- Revue Ometeca, New Mexico, USA
- Revue Histoire et anthropologie, Strasbourg, France
- 1992 Revue Ligeia, n°10, Paris, France
- 1987 Pour la Photographie, Univ. Paris VIII
- 1986 Revue Leonardo, USA
- 1969 Revue Pages, London, Great Britain
- 1967 Revue Approches, Paris, France
