= Transmediale =

Annual media culture festival held in Berlin, Germany

transmediale logo

Transmediale, stylised as transmediale, is an annual festival for art and digital culture in Berlin, usually held over three to five days at the end of January and the beginning of February. transmediale takes the form of a conference (sometimes called a festival), an exhibition, and a film and video programme that often contain or support performances and workshops. Throughout the year, transmediale is also involved in a number of long- and short-term cooperative projects. From its initial focus on video culture, it came to cultivate an artistic and critical dialogue with television and multimedia, emerging as the leading international platform for media art.

The CTM Festival, which began as a part of transmediale, has since become an independent event.

== History ==
transmediale began in 1988 at Berlinale under the name VideoFilmFest by founders Hartmut Horst and video artist Micky Kwella. Horst and Kwella wanted to create a platform for electronic media productions, which were, at that time, excluded from classic film festivals such as Berlinale. In 1989, the program was repeated at Berlinale under the name VideoFest. In 1997, Horst and Kwella renamed VideoFest as transmedia, and then in 1998, transmediale. The change reflected the programmatic extension of the festival, which by then encompassed a broad spectrum of multimedia art forms such as Internet and software art. In 1999, club transmediale was founded as a side event.

In 2001, art historian and curator Andreas Broeckmann took over the artistic direction of transmediale, adding events and a new venue, the Haus der Kulturen der Welt. These changes resulted in an increase in attendance and international audience. That same year, Broeckmann introduced the transmediale Award to honour visionary works and projects centering technology-led societies. In 2002, transmediale introduced an extensive media art exhibition. Shortly thereafter, in 2004, the Kulturstiftung des Bundes (German Federal Cultural Foundation) starting funding transmediale. In 2006, the festival's subheading changed from "international media art festival" to "festival for art and digital culture" in a marked shift to include art, technology, and everyday life as opposed to its previously narrower focus on media art alone. In 2007, media and arts researcher Stephen Kovats became the artistic director of transmediale and one year later, in 2008, he introduced the Vilém Flusser Theory Award, named after Vilém Flusser, to promote "outstanding, media-theoretical and research-based artworks". In April 2011, curator and media researcher Kristoffer Gansing took over transmediale. In 2012, he replaced the existing awards with a residency program for artistic research. In an interview in Ocula Magazine, Gansing commented on the changes in direction of transmediale under his leadership: "When I first came on board ... my idea was to bring a curatorial coherency to what I saw as a festival dissipating into a kind of 'creative crowd' without much focus, so I brought in more exhibitions."

In 2021, Dr Nóra Ó Murchú became the artistic director of transmediale, widening the festival's programme to include a notably more diverse programme in terms of scope, content, and curatorial teams (including Ben Evans James, Elise Misao Hunchuck, Lorena Juan, and Dani Admiss in 2021/22, and Ben Evans James, Elise Misao Hunchuck, Lorena Juan, and Bani Brusadin in 2022/23, and Nadim Choufi, Elise Misao Hunchuck, Lorena Juan, and Yasemin Keskintepe in 2023/24). In 2024, Dr Nóra Ó Murchú left the festival. Elise Misao Hunchuck and Ben Evans James were invited to be co-curators for the 2025 festival, (near) near but—far. Neema Githere and Juan Pablo García Sossa are the curators for the 2026 festival, By the Mango Belt & Tamarind Road: Compassing, Protocoling, Metaphoring.

== Themes ==
Since 2001, transmediale has been developed and curated according to annual themes under the direction of the artistic director and the curatorial team:

- transmediale 2026 By the Mango Belt & Tamarind Road
- transmediale 2025 (near) near but—far
- transmediale 2024 you're doing amazing sweetie
- transmediale 2023 a model, a map, a fiction
- transmediale 2021-22 for refusal
- transmediale 2020 E2E
- transmediale 2019 study circles
- transmediale 2018 face value
- transmediale 2017 ever elusive
- transmediale/conversationpiece 2016
- transmediale 2015 CAPTURE ALL
- transmediale 2014 afterglow
- transmediale 2013 BWPWAP
- transmediale 2k+12 in/compatible
- transmediale.11 RESPONSE:ABILITY
- transmediale.10 FUTURITY NOW!
- transmediale.09 DEEP NORTH
- transmediale.08 CONSPIRE...
- transmediale.07 unfinish!
- transmediale.06 REALITY ADDICTS
- transmediale.05 BASICS
- transmediale.04 FLY UTOPIA!
- transmediale.03 PLAY GLOBAL!
- transmediale.02 go public!
- transmediale.01 DIY [do it yourself!]

== Organisation ==
Kulturprojekte Berlin was the host organisation of the festival until 2020, at which point the association known as transmediale e.V. took over the independent organisation and management of the event.

In 2011, transmediale/resource was established as a framework for transmediale's year-round activities. Its aim is to provide a sustainable structure for feedback, research, and reflection beyond the timeframe of the festival. In addition to varying cooperative projects and network activities, transmediale/resource includes the Vilém Flusser Residency Program for Artistic Research, online publication format transmediale/journal and pre-festival program Vorspiel, presented in collaboration with the CTM Festival and a network of organizations, galleries, independent project spaces, and venues all over Berlin.

== Places ==
Until 1992, VideoFilmFest took place at MedienOperative as well as Deutsche Akademie der Künste in East Berlin. In 1993, it moved to Podewil, which is also where the transmediale offices have been located from 1997 to 2020. In 2020 the office moved to silent green Kulturquartier, where the festival also opened its own project space 'transmediale studio'.

From 2002 to 2005, the Haus der Kulturen der Welt became the festival's main location. In 2006, transmediale relocated to Akademie der Künste, returning to the Haus der Kulturen der Welt in 2008. In addition to Haus der Kulturen der Welt, the festival edition 2021–22 took place in the transmediale studio, Kunstraum Kreuzberg/Bethanien and Betonhalle. In 2023, the festival (a map, a model, a fiction) and exhibition (Or So It Seems) took place in the Akademie der Künste, Hanseatenweg, Berlin, as well as the distributed exhibition (Out of Scale) that unfolded in networks (Spätis, eBay Kleinenzeigen, and so on) across the city. In 2024, the festival (you're doing amazing sweetie) took place in silent green Kulturquartier and Haus der Kulturen der Welt.
