= Velké Janovice =

- Municipality
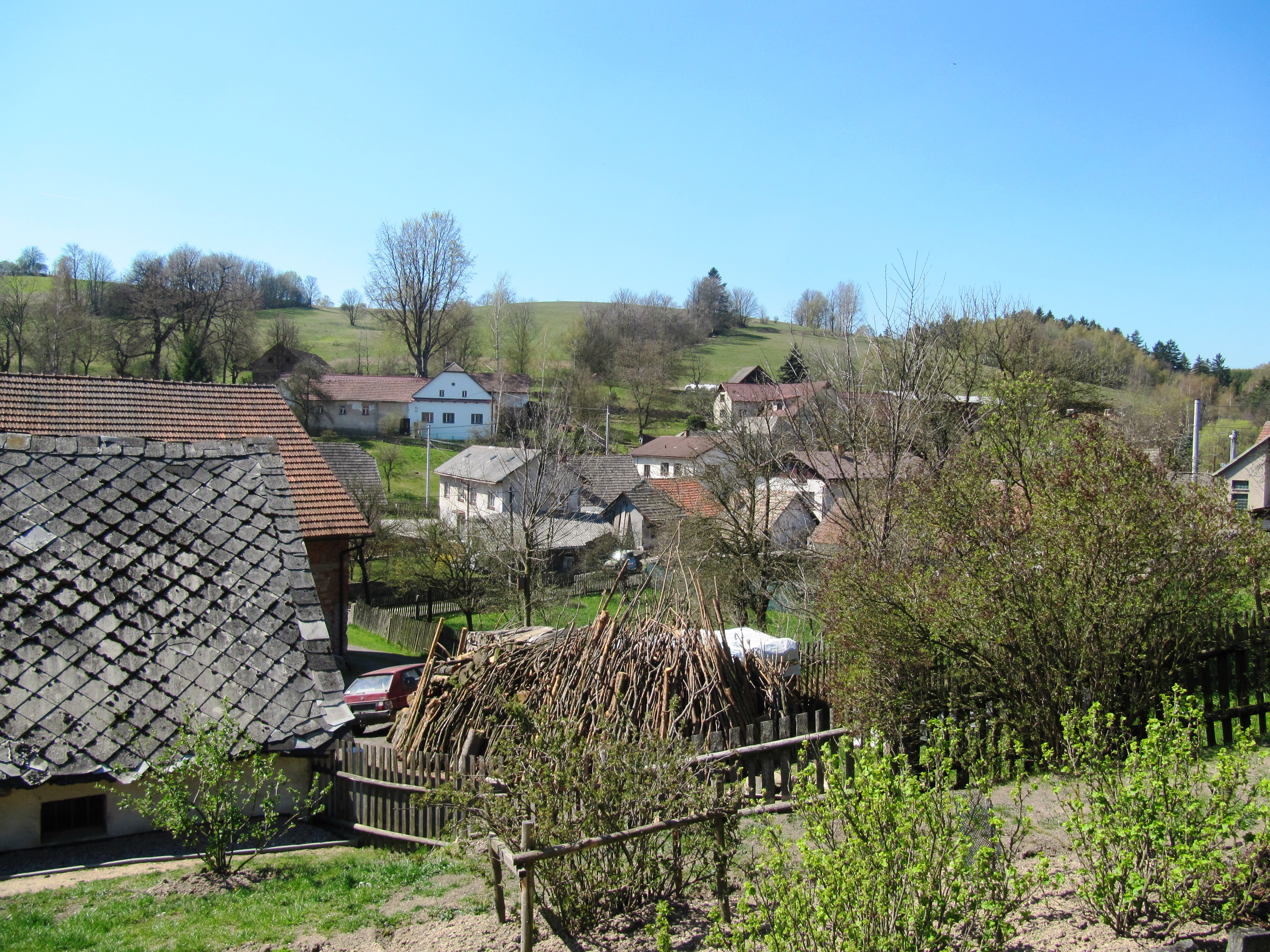
- View from the municipal office

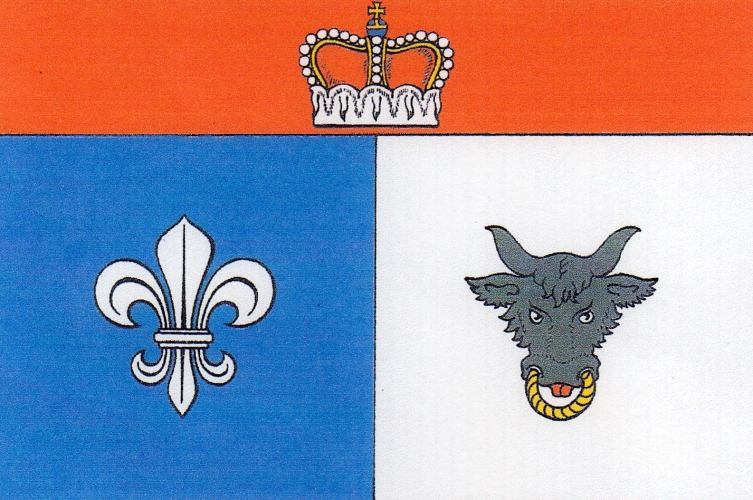
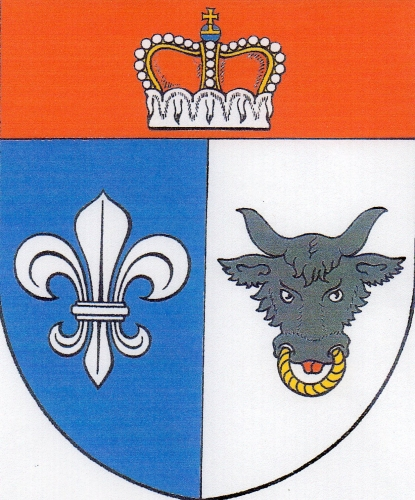
- Flag Coat of arms

- Location in the Czech Republic
- Coordinates: 49°35′16″N 16°13′12″E
- Country: Czech Republic
- Region: Vysočina
- District: Žďár nad Sázavou
- First mentioned: 1364

Area
  - Total: 3.46 km^{2} (1.34 sq mi)
- Elevation: 580 m (1,900 ft)

Population (2026-01-01)
  - Total: 143
  - Density: 41.3/km^{2} (107/sq mi)
- Time zone: UTC+1 (CET)
  - Summer (DST): UTC+2 (CEST)
- Postal code: 593 01
- Website: velkejanovice.cz

Velké Janovice is a municipality and village in Žďár nad Sázavou District in the Vysočina Region of the Czech Republic. It has about 100 inhabitants.

== Geography ==
Velké Janovice is located about 20 kilometres (12 mi) east of Žďár nad Sázavou and 49 km (30 mi) northwest of Brno. It lies in the Upper Svratka Highlands. The highest point is at 701 m (2,300 ft) above sea level.

== History ==
The first written mention of Velké Janovice is from 1364. At the end of the 15th century, the village was acquired by the Pernštejn family. From 1588 until the establishment of an independent municipality in 1850, Velké Janovice belonged to the Bystřice estate.

== Demographics ==
Historical population

Year	Pop.	±%
1869	270	—
1880	289	+7.0%
1890	304	+5.2%
1900	290	−4.6%
1910	263	−9.3%

Year	Pop.	±%
1921	266	+1.1%
1930	248	−6.8%
1950	184	−25.8%
1961	174	−5.4%
1970	163	−6.3%

Year	Pop.	±%
1980	138	−15.3%
1991	133	−3.6%
2001	129	−3.0%
2011	120	−7.0%
2021	132	+10.0%

Source: Censuses

== Transport ==
There are no railways or major roads passing through the municipality.

== Sights ==
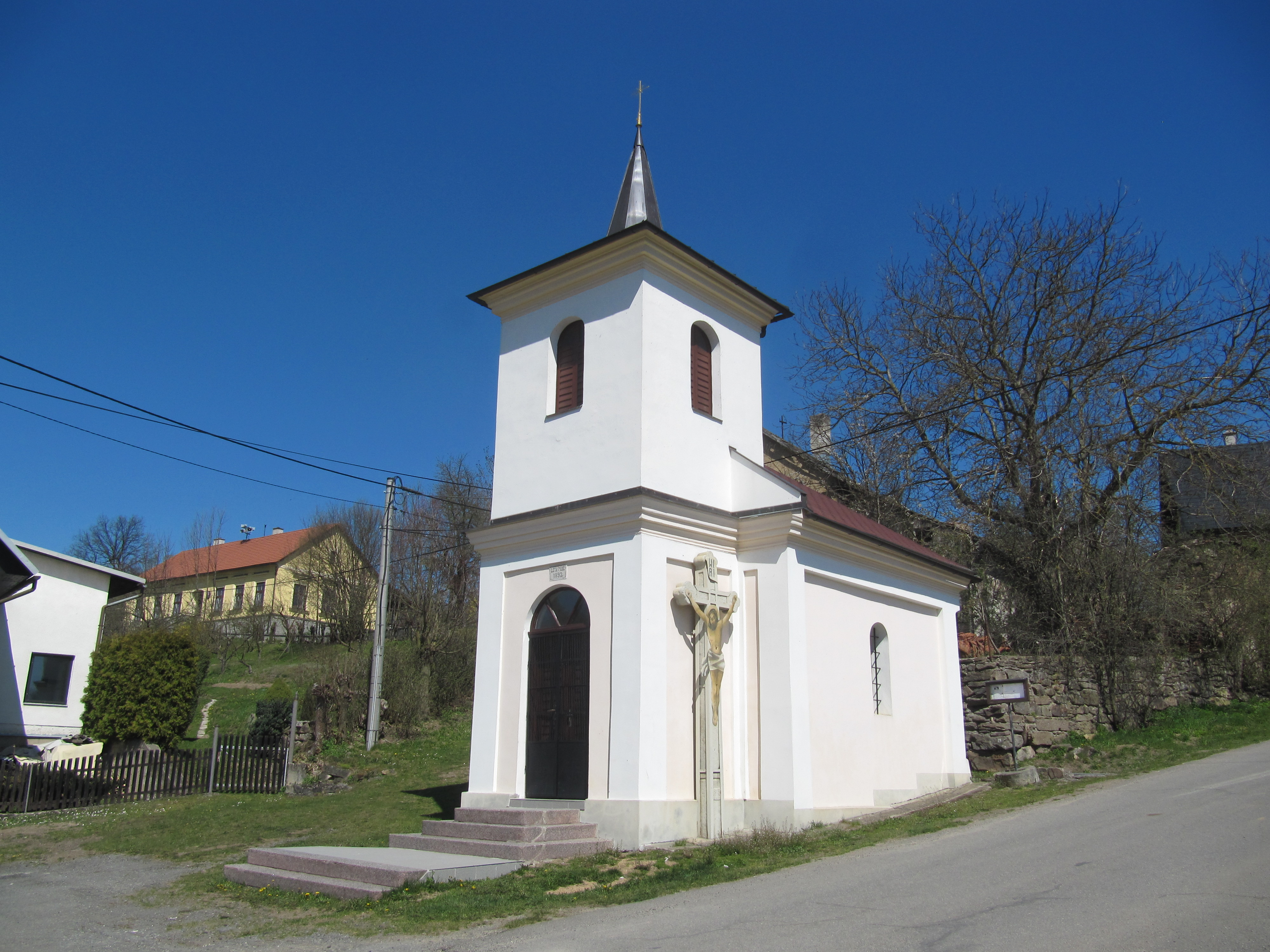
Chapel of Our Lady of Lourdes

There are no protected cultural monuments in the municipality. In the centre of Velké Janovice is the Chapel of Our Lady of Lourdes, which was built in 1892.
