= Robert B. Lisek =

Polish artist and mathematician

Robert B. Lisek is a Polish artist and mathematician who focuses on systems and processes, conducts a research in the area theory of ordered sets in relation with logic, algebra and combinatorics; his artistic practice draws upon conceptual art, radical art strategies, hacktivism, bioart, software art.

== Works ==
Lisek is an artist whose work is focused on systems and processes (computer, biological and social), disrupting the language of these systems, including rules, commands, errors and by using worms and computer viruses. Lisek is currently researching problems of security, privacy and identity in networked societies. He built NEST – Citizens Intelligent Agency, a piece of software for searching hidden patterns and links between people, groups, events, objects and places.

Lisek is also a scientist focused on the computational complexity theory, graph theory and order theory. He studied at the Department of Logic of Wroclaw University, at the Fine Art Academy in Wroclaw and the PWSTiTV film school in Łódź. His research interest is also artificial general intelligence (AGI). He examines, among others: problem of self-reference, mathematical induction, probabilistic techniques and recurrent AI self-improvement. He is also working on human enhancement: extensions through the use of radical transgressive methods that arise at the intersection of disciplines such as AGI, bioengineering, and political and social sciences. He has prepared an anthology entitled Transhuman. Lisek is a founder of Institute for Research in Science and Art, Fundamental Research Lab and an ACCESS art symposium.

== Exhibitions ==
Lisek exhibits, lectures, and conducts workshops worldwide. His projects include among others:

- NEST – FILE Electronic Language International Festival, São Paulo
- NEST – ARCO International Contemporary Art Fair, Madrid
- FLOAT – Lower Manhattan Cultural Council, NY
- FLOAT – Harvestworks Digital Media Art Center, NY
- SPECTRUM – Leto Gallery, Warsaw
- WWAI – SIGGRAPH 2005, Los Angeles
- Falsecodes – Red Gate Gallery & Planetary Collegium, Beijing
- GENGINE – Zacheta National Gallery, Warsaw
- FLEXTEXT – CiberArt Bilbao
- FLEXTEXT – Medi@terra – Byzantine Museum, Athens
- FXT – ACA Japan Media Festival, Tokyo
- STACK – ISEA 02, Nagoya
- SSSPEAR – 17th Meridian, WRO Art Center, Wroclaw
- The New Art Fest (2020), digital art festival, Lisbon
