= Electric Sheep =

Volunteer distributed computing project

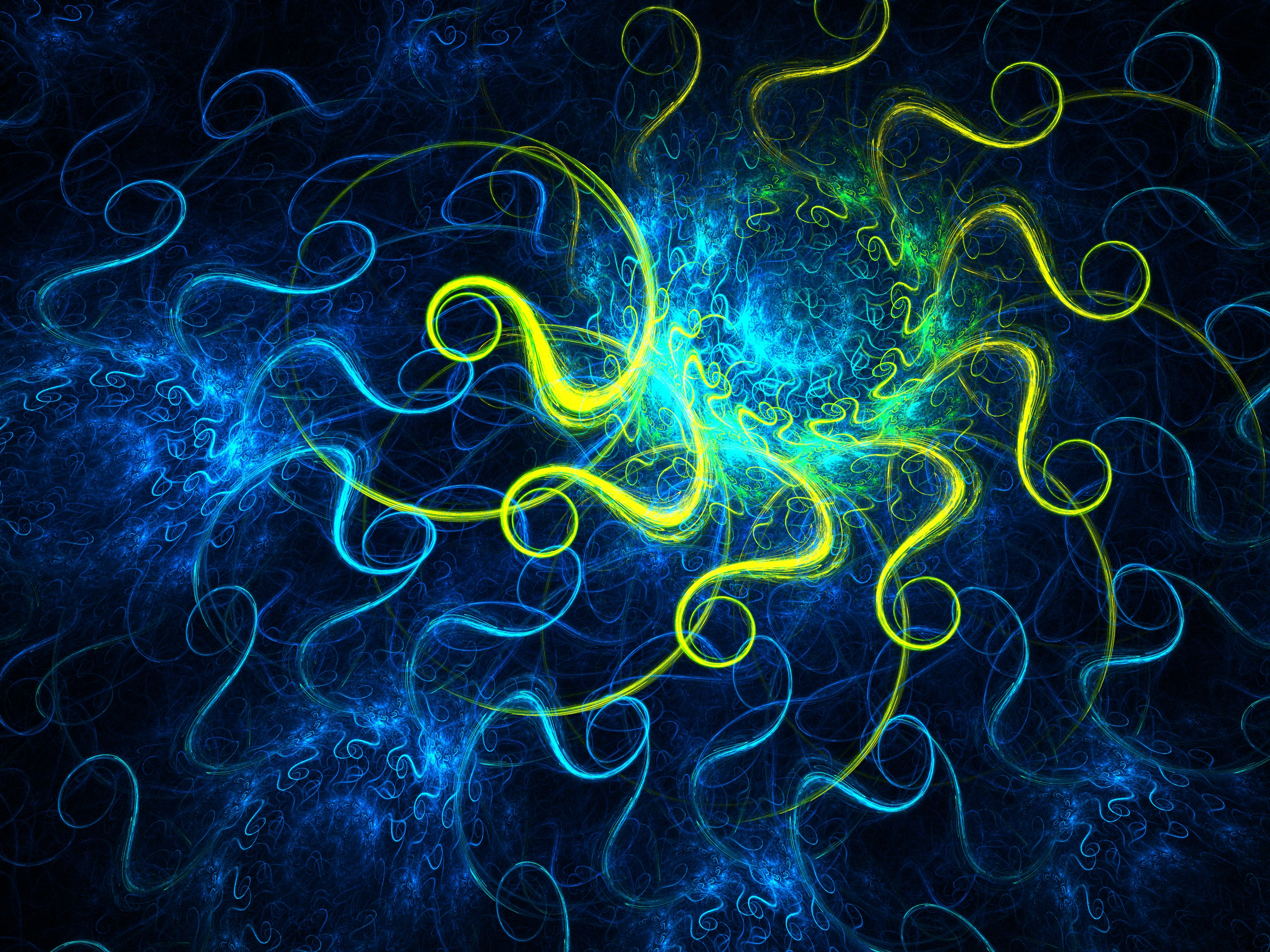
- Developer: Scott Draves
- Initial release: 1999; 27 years ago
- Stable release: 3.0.2 on Mac, 3.0.2 on Windows
- Engine: flam3
- Operating system: Linux, macOS, Microsoft Windows, Android, Apple TV, iPadOS, iOS
- Type: Screensaver
- License: Client: GNU General Public License; Server: not available for 2.7.x
- Website: www.electricsheep.org
- Repository: github.com/scottdraves/electricsheep

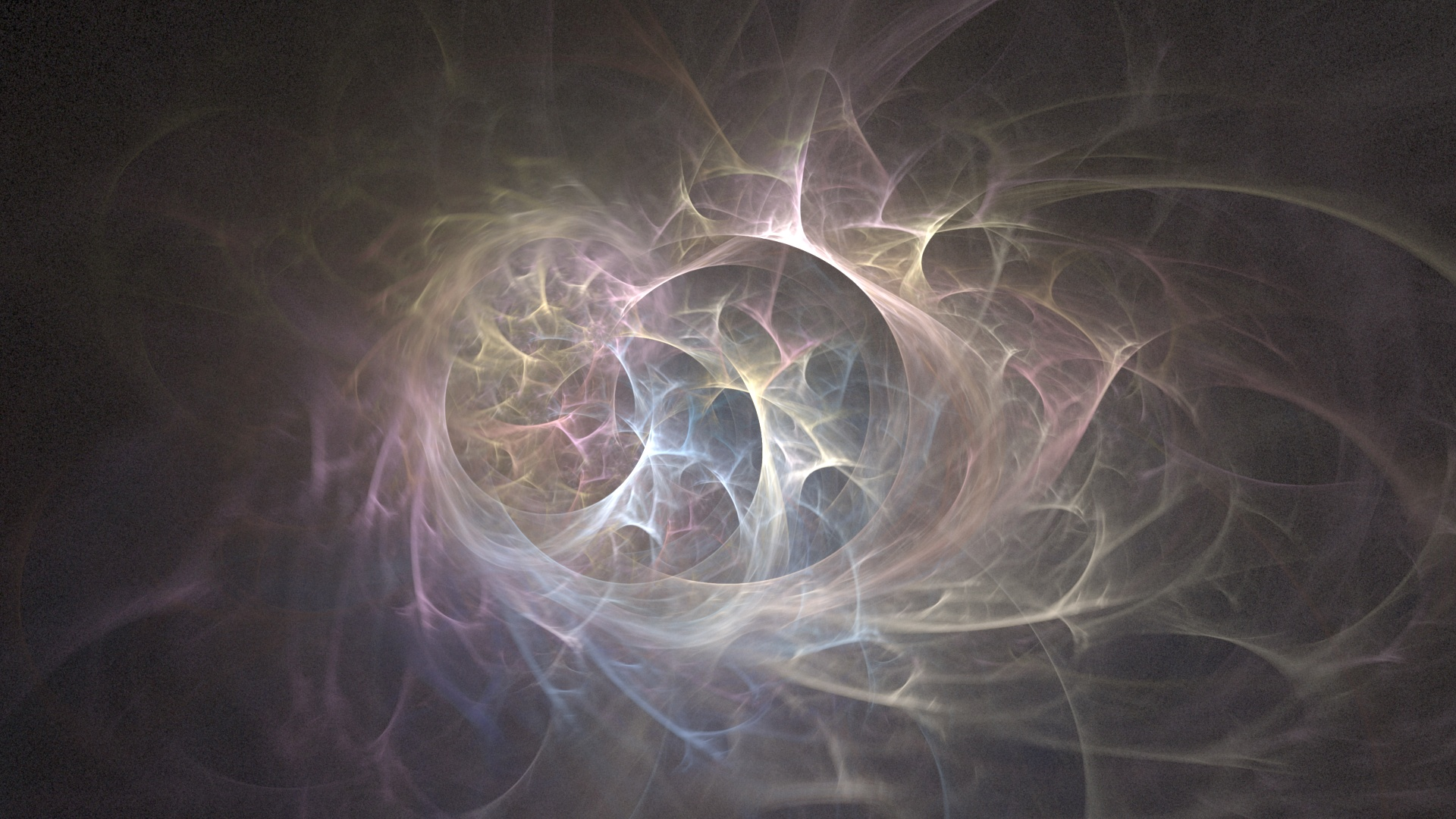
Another sample sheep

Electric Sheep is a collaborative volunteer computing project that uses a genetic algorithm to animate and evolve fractal flames. The generated animations are downloaded to networked computers and displayed as a screensaver. Created by programmer and software artist Scott Draves in 1999, the project harnesses the idle processing power of hundreds of thousands of computers to form a distributed render farm.

As users watch the screensaver, they can vote on their favorite animations. These votes act as the fitness function for the genetic algorithm, allowing the network to "breed" the most popular designs into new, evolving animations. Operating at the intersection of artificial life, generative art, and distributed computing, the project is widely recognized as a pioneering work of digital art. It has been exhibited at major museums including Prix Ars Electronica and the MoMA.

== History and origins ==
Electric Sheep was created in 1999 by software artist and computer scientist Scott Draves. The visual foundation of the project relies on the "fractal flame" algorithm, an extension of iterated function systems (IFS) which Draves created and released as open-source software in 1992.

The name "Electric Sheep" is an homage to the 1968 science fiction novel Do Androids Dream of Electric Sheep? by Philip K. Dick. Draves used the title to mirror the architectural nature of the project: when a user's computer goes to sleep, the screensaver activates and the machine begins rendering (dreaming) the fractal movies (the sheep). Over the years, the software was ported to multiple operating systems, including Linux, macOS, Microsoft Windows, and later mobile platforms like iOS and Android.

== Mathematical foundation: Fractal flames ==
Unlike traditional fractals (such as the Mandelbrot set), which are rendered by escaping time algorithms, the visuals in Electric Sheep are created using the fractal flame algorithm. Fractal flames differ from standard iterated function systems in three distinct ways:

- Non-linear functions: Instead of relying strictly on affine transformations, fractal flames use non-linear equations, resulting in the organic, sweeping curves seen in the screensaver.
- Logarithmic tone-mapping: The density of the fractal is rendered using a logarithmic scale rather than a linear one, which prevents the images from appearing overexposed and preserves the glowing, wispy details.
- Color mapped by structure: Structural data from the math is mapped to color palettes, allowing the algorithms to assign complex gradients to the twisting filaments.

== Technology and distributed network ==
Because rendering high-quality, anti-aliased fractal animations requires massive amounts of processing power, the software acts similarly to the SETI@home project. It links the idle computers of all the users running the screensaver into a single, global supercomputer.

=== Network architecture ===
When a user installs the screensaver, their computer becomes a node in a peer-to-peer and client-server hybrid network. A central server directs the network, assigning specific frames of a fractal animation to individual computers. Each client computer calculates its small piece of the larger animation, uploads the data back to the server, and then downloads the completed video files to display on the screen.

=== The Genetic Algorithm ===
The project functions as an ongoing artificial life experiment. The server stores a "flock" of animations at any given time. The "DNA" or genotype of each sheep consists of roughly 130 parameters—mathematical variables that dictate the color, motion, and shape of the fractal flame. The resulting video animation is the phenotype.

Users watching the screensaver can press the "up" or "down" arrow keys on their keyboard to vote for or against the current animation. The server aggregates these human votes to act as a fitness function. Highly rated sheep are allowed to "mate." The genetic algorithm crosses over the mathematical code of the two parent sheep and introduces random mutations to create offspring animations. Additionally, advanced users can manually design and submit their own fractal parameters, and server administrators (nicknamed "shepherds") can manually guide the mating process. Sheep that receive negative votes or no votes eventually "die" and are removed from the flock. Through this process of selective breeding, the visual quality and complexity of the flock evolves over time.

== Copyright and legal implications ==
Electric Sheep has been the subject of study in legal academia due to the unique copyright issues raised by distributed, generative art. Because the final artwork is created by a combination of Draves's original code, the mathematical mutations generated by the server, the rendering power contributed by anonymous users' computers, and the aesthetic voting choices of the crowd, traditional authorship is difficult to define. To address this, the computer-generated sheep parameters and movies are distributed under a Creative Commons Attribution Noncommercial (CC-BY-NC) license, while parameters manually created and uploaded by advanced users are licensed under Creative Commons Attribution (CC-BY).

== Business model and version history ==
In its early iterations, Electric Sheep was entirely open-source and relied strictly on donated bandwidth and server space. As the project grew to over 500,000 active monthly users, the server costs necessitated a shift in the business model. The project began utilizing a portion of the network's distributed computing power to render commercial animation projects, the sales of which helped keep the servers running. Furthermore, with the release of the 2.7.x and 3.x series, the project adopted a freemium model. While the standard screensaver remained free, users could purchase a "Gold" subscription to receive high-definition (HD) sheep and uncompressed video formats. Because portions of the server code and HD data were no longer entirely free under this new model, the package was subsequently removed from the main Debian repository.

== Artistic impact and exhibitions ==
Although it operates globally as a screensaver, high-definition captures of the Electric Sheep have been heavily exhibited in the contemporary art world. Media theorist Mitchell Whitelaw praised the project in his book Metacreation, describing the evolved visuals as "luminous, twisting, elastic shapes, abstract tangles and loops of glowing filaments."

The project has been featured in installations at the MoMA.org, the Los Angeles County Museum of Art (LACMA), the ZKM Center for Art and Media Karlsruhe, the Museum of the Moving Image, and won an Honorable Mention at the Prix Ars Electronica.

== See also ==
- Evolutionary art
- List of volunteer computing projects
- Software art
- Generative art
