= Michael M. Richter =

German mathematician (1938–2020)

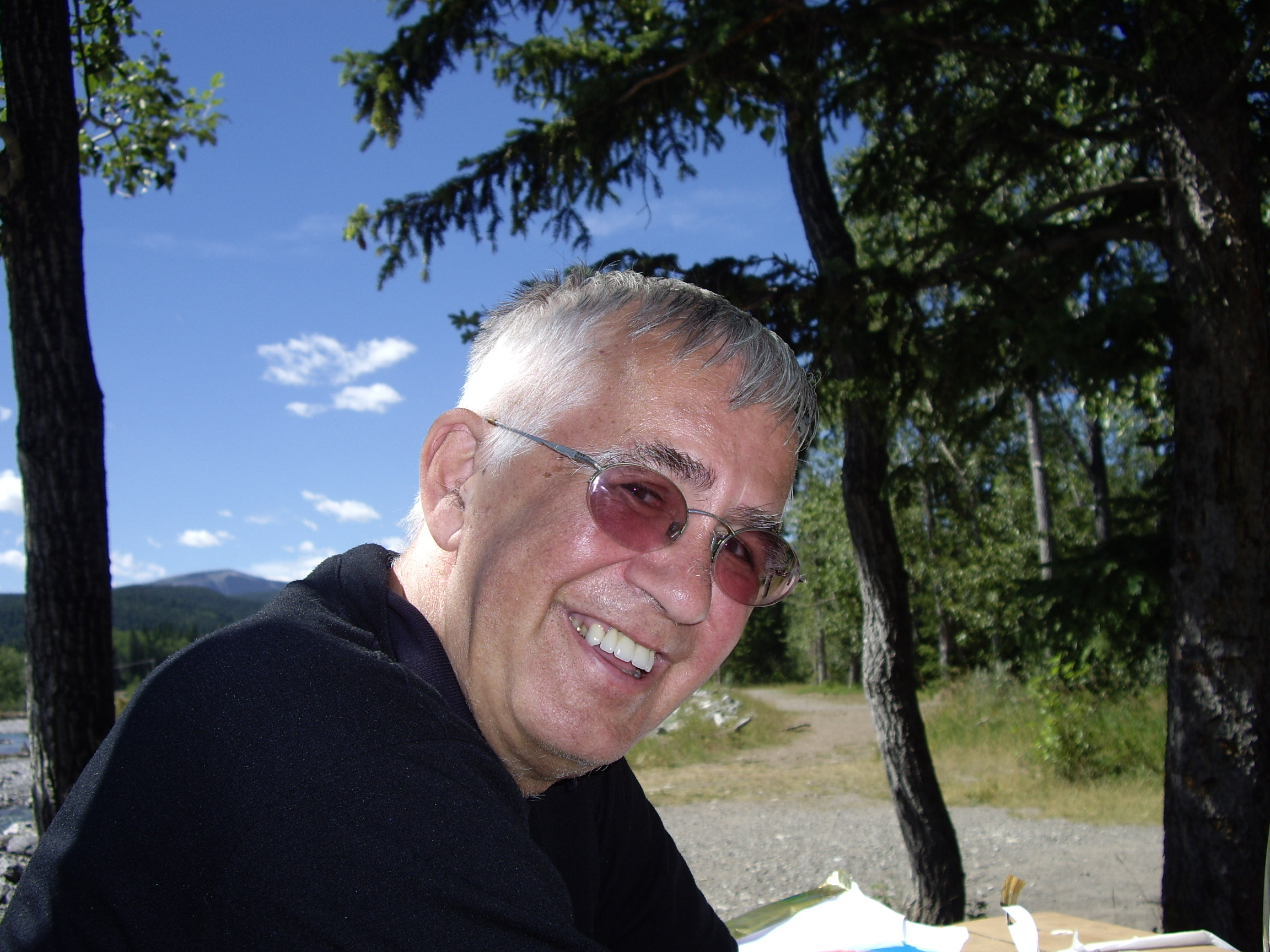
Michael M. Richter

Michael M. Richter (21 June 1938 – 10 July 2020) was a German mathematician and computer scientist. Richter is well known for his career in mathematical logic, in particular non-standard analysis, and in artificial intelligence, in particular in knowledge-based systems and case-based reasoning (CBR, Fallbasiertes Schließen). He is worldwide known as pioneer in case-based reasoning.

== Life ==
Richter was born in Berlin into an educated family: his father was Dr. Paul Kurt Richter, a literary scientist; his grandfather was Dr. Carl Greiff, a medical scientist (in 1940, Greiff published a 544 pages book called Diabetes-Probleme with the publisher Johann Ambrosius Barth). Richter studied mathematics 1959–1965 at the University of Münster and the University of Freiburg, where he completed his Ph.D. in Mathematical Logic under the supervision of Walter Felscher and he obtained his Habilitation in 1973 in Mathematics at the University of Tübingen. After teaching at the University of Texas at Austin, he was Professor for Mathematics at the RWTH Aachen from 1975 to 1986. In 1986, he accepted a chair for Computer Science at the University of Kaiserslautern where he taught until his retirement in 2003.

During his academic career, he held visiting positions at Austin, Florianópolis and Calgary; he was also teaching at the University of St. Gallen from 1994 to 2000. Finally, he was adjunct professor at the University of Calgary and Visiting Professor at the Universidade Federal de Santa Catarina, Florianópolis, Brazil. He had 65 doctoral students and 296 Masters' students during his career, many of which now hold tenured academic positions in various parts of the world. He is the author of nine books the most recent of which is Case-Based Reasoning: A Textbook published with Springer Verlag. His son Peter P. Richter (born 1976) is a geologist with a doctoral degree from the University of Mainz, currently employed at the University of Kiel.

He died on 10 July 2020 at the age of 82.

== Activities ==
From 1981 to 1985 Michael Richter was President of the Deutsche Vereinigung für mathematische Logik und für Grundlagenforschung der exakten Wissenschaften (DVMLG). Starting 1987 he was for five years co-initiator and co-chair of an annual series of conferences Logic in Computer Science. In 1989 Michael Richter became head of the research group Mathematical Logic (until 2004) from the Heidelberg Academy of Sciences (Heidelberger Akademie der Wissenschaften). There he continued and extended the Omega Bibliography, a worldwide unique scientific collection containing all publications in Mathematical Logic since 1889 in classified way. In Kaiserslautern he was member of the managing committee of two consecutive special research groups of the Deutsche Forschungsgemeinschaft (DFG): Artificial Intelligence and Development of Large Systems with Generic Methods. In 1988 he was one of the founders of the DFKI at Kaiserslautern, the German Research Center on Artificial Intelligence, the first scientific director and later on head of the Intelligent Engineering Group. He was one of the forerunners in turning static expert systems into flexible assistant systems. An outstanding project was ARC-TEC: Acquisition, Representation and Compilation of Technical Knowledge. After 1990, his university group was participating in literally all major European projects on Case-Based Reasoning. The most influential project was Highlights of the European INRECA Projects (Inductive Reasoning on Cases), where a basic methodology was developed. In 1993 the group initiated the first European Workshop on Case-Based Reasoning in Kaiserslautern (EWCBR) which was after that a biannual event and complemented by the International Conferences on CBR (ICCBR 2007).

== Work ==
In logic Michael Richter specialized on non-standard analysis where he wrote a monograph and created with his student B. Benninghofen the Theory of Superinfinitesimals. Under the influence of W.W. Bledsoe he became interested in Artificial Intelligence. In Aachen he developed the first and still only program to apply rewrite rules to group theory. In Software Engineering his group concentrated on process modeling. In his group the MILOS-System was developed. It was leading in process modeling and is now substantially extended by Frank Maurer in Calgary to the system MASE. Together with his student Aldo v. Wangenheim he created the Cyclops group, that worked on image understanding, and developed new tools based on configuration system. This research gave now rise to various applications and is heavily continued in Florianópolis, Brazil. Around 1990 Michael Richter started to work on Case-Based Reasoning. Initially, it was an extension of the work on technical expert systems. He introduced several basic concepts and views in CBR. A very influential one was the notion knowledge containers. It is basic for building and maintaining CBR systems. He made several important and systematic contributions to the notion of similarity. These include the relation of similarity measures to general concepts of uncertainty and the knowledge contained in similarity measures. On the foundational side his group related similarity to utility and Michael Richter gave a formal semantics of similarity in terms of utilities. Since 1990 Michael Richter was concerned with combining basic research and useful applications. As an example, his group founded tecinno company (now empolis) which is a very successful company in “selling CBR and knowledge management“.

== Some major publications ==
Michael M. Richter has written numerous publications in Mathematics, General Computer Science, Artificial Intelligence, Medical Informatics and Operations Research. He has written and/or edited 25 books. Some influential publications are:

- Michael M. Richter: Logikkalküle. Teubner Studienbücher Informatik (Leitfäden der angewandten Mathematik und Mechanik). Stuttgart 1978, p. 232
- Michael M. Richter: Ideale Punkte, Monaden und Nichtstandardmethoden. Vieweg-Verlag, Wiesbaden 1982, p. 269
- B. Benninghofen, Michael M. Richter: A general theory of superinfinitesimals. Fundamenta Mathematicae 128 (1987), pp. 199–215.
- The Knuth-Bendix Completion Procedure, the Growth Function and Polycyclic Groups. In: Proc. Logic Colloquium ’86, ed. F. Drake, J. Truss, North-Holland Publ. Co. pp. 261–275.
- B. Benninghofen, S. Kemmerich, Michael M. Richter: Systems of Reductions. SLN in Computer Science 277 (1987); 265 + VII p.
- Michael M. Richter: Prinzipen der Künstlichen Intelligenz. Teubner Studienbücher Informatik, Stuttgart 1989, p. 355
- Michael M. Richter: Prinzipen der Künstlichen Intelligenz (2nd Edition). Teubner Studienbücher Informatik, Stuttgart 1991, p. 355
- Michael M. Richter, S. Wess: Similarity, Uncertainty and Case-Based Reasoning in PATDEX. In: R. S. Boyer (Ed.), Automated Reasoning, Essays in Honor of Woody Bledsoe, Kluwer Academic Publishers, 1991.
- T. Pfeifer, Michael M. Richter: Diagnose von Technischen Systemen. Deutscher Universitätsverlag 1993
- Recent Developments in Case-Based Reasoning: Improvements of Similarity Measures. In: New Approaches in Classification and Data Analysis, ed. E. Diday, Y. Lechevallier, M. Schader, P. Bertrand, B. Burtschy, Springer Verlag 1994, S. 594-601.
- R. Kühn, R. Menzel, W. Menzel, U. Ratsch, Michael M. Richter, I. O. Stamatescu: Adaptivity and Learning: An Interdisciplinary Debate. Springer Verlag, 2003
- Michael M. Richter, Agnar Aamodt: Case-based reasoning foundations. Knowledge Engineering Review, 20:3 Cambridge University Press, p. 203-207 (2006).
- Foundations of Similarity and Utility. Proc. Flairs 07, AAAI Press
- Similarity. In: Case-Based Reasoning for Signals and Imaging, ed. Petra Perner, Springer Verlag 2007, pp. 25–90.
- Michael M. Richter, Rosina Weber: Case-Based Reasoning. A Textbook. Springer Verlag 2013, p. 546
- Richter, M.M., Paul, S., Këpuska, V. and Silaghi, M., 2022. Signal processing and machine learning with applications (pp. 1-603). Springer.
