= Scott Draves =

American artist

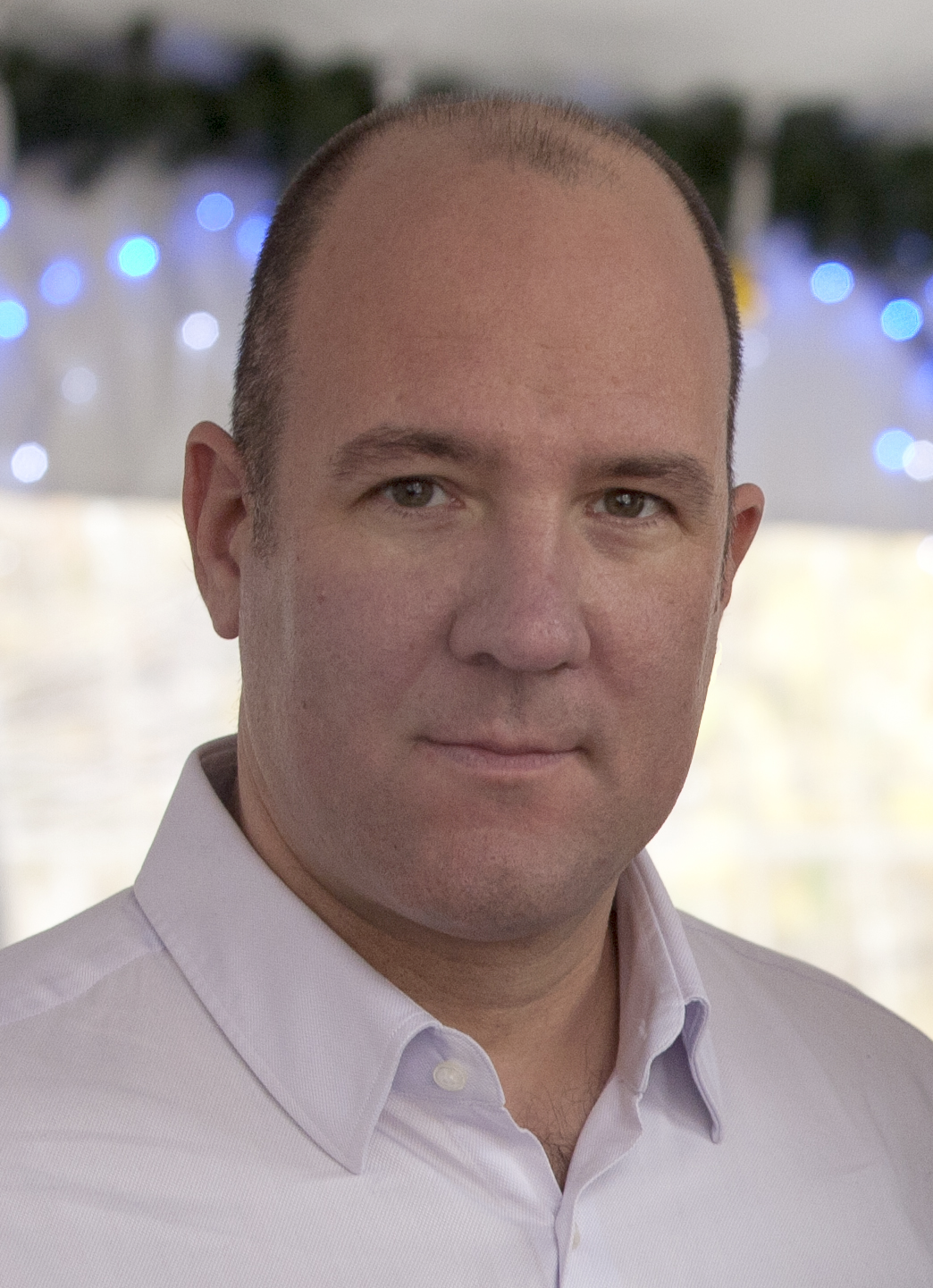
- Born: 1968 (age 57–58)
- Known for: Software art
- Notable work: Flame, Fuse, Bomb, Electric Sheep, Dreams in High Fidelity
- Awards: Prix Ars Electronica, Vida 2.0, Vida 4.0, ZKM App Art Award

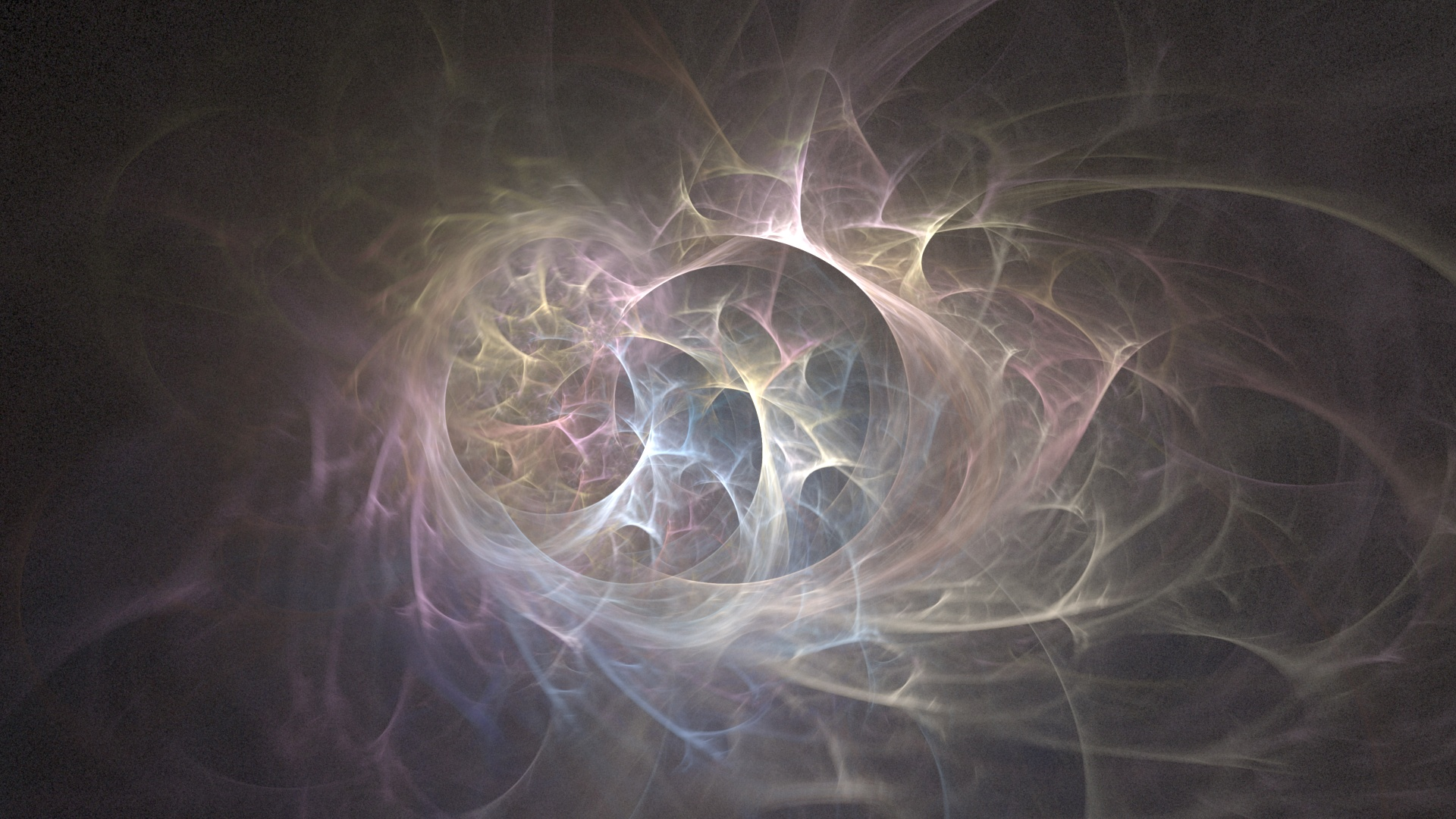
An image from the Electric Sheep

Scott Draves is an American digital artist. He is the inventor of fractal flames and the leader of the distributed computing project Electric Sheep. He also invented patch-based texture synthesis and published the first implementation of this class of algorithms. He is also a video artist and accomplished VJ.

In summer 2010, Draves' work was exhibited at Google's New York City office, including his video piece "Generation 243" which was generated by the collaborative influences of 350,000 people and computers worldwide. Stephen Hawking's 2010 book The Grand Design used an image generated by Draves' "flame" algorithm on its cover. Known as "Spot," Draves currently resides in New York City.

In July 2012 Draves won the ZKM App Art Award Special Prize for Cloud Art for the mobile Android version of Electric Sheep.

== Background ==
Draves earned a Bachelor's in mathematics at Brown University, where he was a student of Andy van Dam before continuing on to earn a PhD in computer science at Carnegie Mellon University. At CMU he studied under Andrew Witkin, Dana Scott, and Peter Lee.
