= List of Cambridge Companions to Music =

The Cambridge Companions to Music form a book series published by Cambridge University Press. Each book is a collection of essays on the topic commissioned by the publisher. The first was published in 1993, the Cambridge Companion to the Violin. Since then numerous volumes have been published nearly every year, covering a variety of instruments, composers, performers, compositions genres and traditions.

== Volumes ==
The Cambridge Companion...
to...	Contributors, sortable by editor(s) (in bold)	Publ.	ISBN	Ref.
Amy Beach	**E. Douglas Bomberger**, Marian Wilson Kimber, Robin Rausch, Bill F. Faucett, Kirsten Johnson, Katherine Kelton, R. Larry Todd, Douglas W. Shadle, Matthew Phelps, Nicole Powlison	2023	978-1-108-96504-0	
Arvo Pärt	**Andrew Shenton**, Immo Mihkelson, Jeffers Engelhardt, Leopold Brauneiss, Thomas Robinson, Marguerite Bostonia, Robert Sholl, Benjamin Skipp, Laura Dolp, Andreas Peer Kähler, Arvo Pärt	2012	978-0-521-27910-9	
Bach	Malcolm Boyd, Ulrich Siegele, Robin A. Leaver, **John Butt**, Stephen A. Crist, Werner Breig, Richard D. P. Jones, Laurence Dreyfus, Stephen Daw, George B. Stauffer, Martin Zenck	1997	978-0-521-58780-8	
Ballet	Ivor Guest, **Marion Kant**, Jennifer Nevile, Marina Nordera, Barbara Ravelhofer, Mark Franko, Dorion Weickmann, Sandra Noll Hammond, T. C. W. Blanning, Judith Chazin-Benahum, Inge Baxmann, Sarah Davis Cordova, Anne Middlebo Christensen, Marian E. Smith, Lynn Garafola, Thérèse Hurley, Lucia Ruprecht, Erik Näslund, Tim Scholl, Matilda Butkas, Juliet Bellow, Jennifer Fisher, Yangwen Zhen, Lester Tome	2007	978-0-521-53986-9	
Bartók	**Amanda Bayley**, Lynn Hooker, Stephen Erdely, David Cooper, Carl Leafstedt, Rachel Beckles Willson, Victoria Fischer, Susan Bradshaw, Nicky Losseff, Peter Laki, David E. Schneider, Malcolm Gillies, Danielle Fosler-Lussier, Ivan F. Waldbauer, Vera Lampert	2001	978-0-521-66958-0	
The Beatles	Anthony DeCurtis, **Kenneth Womack**, Dave Laing, Jerry Zolten, Howard Kramer, James M. Decker, Russell Reising, Jim LeBlanc, Ian Inglis, Steve Hamelman, Bruce Spizer, Michael Frontani, Walter Everett, Sheila Whiteley, Gary Burns, John Kimsey	2009	978-0-521-68976-2	
Beethoven	**Glenn Stanley**, Barry Cooper, Elaine Sisman, Roger Kamien, Nicholas Marston, William Kinderman, Mark Kaplan, John Daverio, Leon Botstein, Amanda Glauert, Michael Tusa, Birgit Lodes, Margaret Notley, Alain Frogley, Scott Burnham, David Dennis	2000	978-0-521-58934-5	
Benjamin Britten	**Mervyn Cooke**, Christopher Mark, Paul Kildea, Philip Reed, Stephen Arthur Allen, Arnold Whittall, Antonia Malloy-Chirgwin, Clifford Hindley, Donald Mitchell, Philip Rupprecht, Ralph Woodward, Eric Roseberry, Judith LeGrove	1999	978-0-521-57476-1	
Berg	Christopher Hailey, Andrew Barker, Raymond Geuss, **Anthony Pople**, Kathryn Bailey, Derrick Puffett, Douglas Jarman, Patricia Hall, Neil Boynton, Judy Lochhead, Arnold Whittall	1997	978-0-521-56489-2	
Berlioz	**Peter Bloom**, Jacques Barzun, Janet Johnson, Julian Rushton, Jeffrey Langford, Diana Bickley, James Haar, Ralph Locke, Annegret Fauser, Pierre Citron, Katherine Kolb, Katharine Ellis, Joël-Marie Fauquet, D. Kern Holoman, Hugh Macdonald, David Cairns, Lesley Wright	2000	978-0-521-59638-1	
Brahms	Kurt Hofmann, **Michael Musgrave**, Leon Botstein, John Rink, David Brodbeck, Kofi Agawu, Malcolm MacDonald, Daniel Beller-McKenna, Roger Norrington, Robert Pascall, Hugh Wood	1999	978-0-521-48581-4	
Brass Instruments	**Trevor Herbert**, **John Wallace**, Margaret Sarkissian, Arnold Myers, Robert Barclay, Keith Polk, Bruce Dickey, Edward H. Tarr, Thomas Hiebert, Ralph T. Dudgeon, Clifford Bevan, Simon Wills, Phillip Eastop, Robert Evans, Roger T. Dean	1997	978-0-521-56522-6	
Bruckner	**John Williamson**, Andrea Harrandt, Paul Hawkshaw, A. Crawford Howie, Derek B. Scott, Benjamin Korstvedt, Julian Horton, Margaret Notley, Kevin Swinden, Christa Brüstle	2004	978-0-521-00878-5	
Caribbean Music	Lester Monts, **Nanette de Jong**, Robin Moore, Frances R Aparicio, Angelina Tallaj, Deborah Pacini-Hernandez, Michael Largey, Brenda F. Berrain, Florabelle Spielmann, Hélène Zamor, Apollinaire Anakesa Kululuka, David V Moskowitz, Felicity Laurence, Linda F. Williams, Julio Nazario	2022	978-1-108-43306-8	
the Cello	John Dilworth, Bernard Richardson, Margaret Campbell, **Robin Stowell**, David Wyn Jones, Peter Allsop, Valerie Walden, R. Caroline Bosanquet, Frances-Marie Uitti	1999	978-0-521-62928-7	
Chopin	Janet Ritterman, David Rowland, Simon Finlow, John Rink, **Jim Samson**, Jeffrey Kallberg, Adrian Thomas, Anatole Leikin, James Methuen-Campbell, Zofia Chechlinska, Derek Carew, Roy Howat	1995	978-0-521-47752-9	
Choral Music	John Rutter, **André de Quadros**, Andrew Parrott, Chester Alwes, Nick Strimple, Paul Hillier, Leo Samama, Patricia Abbott, Victoria Meredith, Matthew Mehaffey, Kathy Saltzman Romey, María Guinand, Jing Ling-Tam, Gene J. Cho, Aida Huseynova, Karen Grylls, Rudolf de Beer, Wilson Shitandi, Francisco J. Núñez, Mary Goetze, Cornelia Fales, Wolodymyr Smishkewych, Doreen Rao, Mike Brewer, Liz Garnett, Ann Howard Jones, Simon Carrington	2012	978-0-521-12895-7	
the Clarinet	Nicholas Shackleton, Basil Tschaikov, Georgina Dobrée, Michael Harris, Jo Rees-Davis, Pamela Weston, Antony Pay, Paul Harris, **Colin Lawson**, Nicholas Cox, Roger Heaton, John Robert Brown, Michael Bryant	1996	978-0-521-47668-3	
the Concerto	**Simon P. Keefe**, Tia DeNora, Michael Talbot, David Yearsley, Stephan D. Lindeman, R. Larry Todd, David E. Schneider, Arnold Whittall, Cliff Eisen, Robin Stowell, David Rowland, Timothy Day	2005	978-0-521-54257-9	
Conducting	Raymond Holden, Charles Barber, Michael Haas, Joseph Silverstein, Vance George, Sir Charles Mackerras, Robert L. Ripley, **José Antonio Bowen**, David Cairns, Michael Rose, David Mermelstein, Stephen Johnson, David Nice, Bramwell Tovey, Michelle Edwards, Bernard Sherman, Harold Faberman, Martyn Brabbins, Stephen Wright, Leon Botstein	2003	978-0-521-52791-0	
Debussy	**Simon Trezise**, Robert Orledge, Barbara L. Kelly, Deirdre Donnellon, David Grayson, Roger Nichols, Nigel Simeone, Julie McQuinn, Caroline Potter, Boyd Pomeroy, Mark DeVoto, Richard S. Parks, Charles Timbrell, Arnold Whittall	2003	978-0-521-65478-4	
Drum Kit	**Joseph Michael Pignato**, **Daniel Akira Stadnicki**, **Matt Brennan**, Paul Archibald, Steven Baur, Pedro Ojeda, Juan David Rubio Restrepo, Daniel Gohn, Ben Reimer, Scott Hanenberg, Paul Thompson, Brett Lashua, Bryden Stillie, Carlos Xavier Rodriguez, Patrick Hernly, Bill Bruford, Mandy Smith, Adam Patrick Bell, Cornel Hrisca-Munn, Vincent Andrisani, Margaret MacAulay, Nat Grant, Gareth Dylan Smith	2021	978-1-108-74765-3	
Duke Ellington	**Edward Green**, Evan Spring, John Howland, David Berger, Stephen D. James, J. Walker James, Brian Priestley, Olly W. Wilson, Trevor Weston, Jeffrey Magee, Andrew Berish, Anna Harwell Celenza, Anthony Brown, Dan Morgenstern, Benjamin Givan, Walter van de Leur, Bill Dobbins, Marcello Piras, Will Friedwald, Benjamin Bierman	2015	978-0-521-70753-4	
Eighteenth-Century Opera	**Anthony R. DelDonna**, **Pierpaolo Polzonetti**, James Webster, Caryl Clark, Francesco Cotticelli, Paologiovanni Maione, Gianni Cicali, Rebecca Harris-Warrick, John Spitzer, Alessandra Campana, David Charlton, Estelle Joubert, Michael Burden, Manuel Carlos de Brito, Louise Stein, José Máximo Leza	2009	978-0-521-69538-1	
Electronic Music	**Nick Collins**, **Julio d'Escriván**, Andrew Hugill, Margaret Schedel, Ge Wang, Sergi Jordà, Karlheinz Essl, Amy Alexander, Julian Rohrhuber, Stefania Serafin, Petri Toiviainen, Natasha Barrett	2008; 1st ed. 2017; 2nd ed.	978-0-521-68865-9 978-1-107-59002-1	
Elgar	**Daniel M. Grimley**, **Julian Rushton**, Jeremy Dibble, Robert Anderson, Christopher Kent, Diana McVeagh, Robin Holloway, Byron Adams, John Butt, Christopher Mark, J. P. E. Harper-Scott, Timothy Day, Jenny Doctor, Aidan Thomson, Charles Edward McGuire	2005	978-0-521-53363-8	
the Eroica Symphony	**Nancy November**, Scott Burnham, Mark Ferraguto, Erica Burrman, Federica Rovelli, William Drabkin, Vasili Byros, Nicholas Marston, Elaine Sisman, Beate Angelika Kraus, Leon Botstein, Melanie Lowe	2020	978-1-108-43557-4	
Film music	**Mervyn Cooke**, **Fiona Ford**, James Buhler, Hannah Lewis, David Cooper, Ben Winters, Stephen Glynn, George Fenton, Guido Heldt, Kate Daubney, Peter Franklin, Miguel Mera, David Butler, Krin Gabbard, Stan Link, Robynn J. Stilwell, Caryl Flinn, Paul Wells, Sergio Miceli, Danae Stefanou, Annette Davison, Tim Koozin, Mekala Padmanabhan	2016	978-1-107-47649-3	
French Music	**Simon Trezise**, Alice V. Clark, Lawrence Earp, Fabrice Fitch, Peter Bennett, Georgia J. Cowart, Debra Nagy, Michael McClellan, Andy Fry, Jonathan Goldman, Jacqueline Waeber, Steven Huebner, Luc Charles-Dominique, David Loosely, John Haines, Andrew Tomasello, Jeanice Brooks, Katharine Ellis	2015	978-0-521-70176-1	
Gershwin	Michael Owen, Ellen Noonan, Susan Neimoyer, Jessica Getman, Kristen M. Turner, Todd Decker, Timothy Freeze, Mark Clague, **Anna Harwell Celenza**, Naomi André, Nathan Platte, Howard Pollack, Will Friedwald, Ryan Raul Bañagale, Nate Sloan, Michael Feinstein	2019	978-1-108-43764-6	
Gilbert and Sullivan	**David Eden**, **Meinhard Saremba**, William Parry, Benedict Taylor, Richard Silverman, Horst Dölvers, Laura Kasson Fiss, Michael Beckerman, James Brooks Kuykendall, Martin T. Yates, Mike Leigh, Ian Bradley, Stephanie Pitts, Raymond Knapp, Jana Polianovskaia, David Russell Hulme	2009	978-0-521-71659-8	
Grand Opera	**David Charlton**, Hervé Lacombe, Nicholas White, Simon Williams, James Parakilas, Marian Smith, Mary Ann Smart, David Pountney, Sarah Hibberd, Herbert Schneider, Matthias Brzoska, John H. Roberts, Diana R. Hallman, M. Elizabeth C. Bartlet, Steven Huebner, Thomas Grey, Marina Frolova-Walker, Jan Smaczny, Fiamma Nicolodi	2003	978-0-521-64683-3	
the Guitar	**Victor Anand Coelho**, Peter Manuel, Chris Smith, Banning Eyre, Graeme Boone, Jas Obrecht, Steve Waksman, Gordon Ross, Craig Russell, David Tanenbaum, Stewart Pollens	2003	978-0-521-00040-6	
Handel	**Donald Burrows**, John Butt, Carlo Vitali, William Weber, Judith Milhous, Robert D. Hume, H. Diack Johnstone, Lowell Lindgren, Ruth Smith, C. Steven LaRue, David Ross Hurley, Anthony Hicks, Graydon Beeks, Malcolm Boyd, Terence Best, Mark W. Stahura, Winton Dean	1998	978-0-521-45613-5	
the Harpsichord	John Koster, Pieter Dirksen, Andrew Woolley, Ton Koopman, **Mark Kroll**, Rebecca Cypess, João Pedro d'Alvarenga, Águeda Pedrero-Encabo, Marina Ritzarev, Anna Maria McElwain, Pedro Persone, Robert L. Marshal, Larry Palmer, Paul Poletti	2019	978-1-316-60970-5	
Haydn	**Caryl Clark**, Elaine Sisman, Rebecca Green, James Webster, David Wyn Jones, Scott Burnham, Matthew Head, David Schroeder, Mary Hunter, Michelle Fillion, James Dack, Katalin Komlós, Tom Beghin, James Garrett, Lawrence Kramer, Melanie Lowe	2005	978-0-521-54107-7	
Hip-Hop	**Justin A. Williams**, Alice Price-Styles, Imani K. Johnson, Ivor Miller, Kjetil Falkenberg Hansen, Travis Gosa, Christina Zanfagna, Nicole Hodges Persley, Oliver Kautny, Kyle Adams, Chris Tabron, Anthony Kwame Harrison, Geoff Harkness, Regina Bradley, Chris Deis, Amanda Sewell, Adam Haupt, Noriko Manabe, Richard Bramwell, Sujatha Fernandes, Ali Coleen Neff, Mike D'Errico, Brenna Byrd, Loren Kajikawa, Michael Jeffries	2015	978-1-107-64386-4	
Jazz	Krin Gabbard, **David Horn**, Bruce Johnson, Jed Rasula, Robert Crease, Travis Jackson, Ingrid Monson, Pete Martin, **Mervyn Cooke**, Darius Brubeck, Jeff Pressing, Stuart Nicholson, David Ake, David Sagar, Thomas Owens, Robert Walser, Dave Laing	2003	978-0-521-66388-5	
Jewish Music	**Joshua S. Walden**, Philip Bohlman, Edwin Seroussi, Judah M. Cohen, Theodore W. Burgh, Mark Kligman, Susana Weich-Shahak, Joel Rubin, Joshua R. Jacobson, David Conway, James Loeffler, Tina Frühauf, Lily E. Hirsch, Mark Slobin, Jehoash Hirshberg, Amy Lynn Wlodarski	2015	978-1-107-62375-0	
John Cage	**David Nicholls**, Christopher Shultis, David W. Patterson, David W. Bernstein, Kathan Brown, William Brooks, Leta E. Miller, John Holzaepfel, Alastair Williams, Kyle Gann	2002	978-0-521-78968-4	
K-Pop	Suk-Young Kim, Roald Maliangkay, Hyunjoon Shin, Jung-Min Mina Lee, Hyewon Kim, Chuyun Oh, CedarBough T. Saeji, Stephanie Choi, So-Rim Lee, Kyung Hyun Kim, Youngdae Kim, Candace Epps-Robertson, Michelle Cho, Thomas Baudinette, Youjeong Oh	2023	978-1-108-94003-0	
Krautrock	**Uwe Schütte**, Ulrich Adelt, Detlef Siegfried, Alexander Simmeth, Jan-Peter Herbst, Heather Moore, Patrick Glen, Sean Nye, Michael Krikorian, David Stubbs, Alexander Henkle, David Pattie, Sascha Seiler, Pertti Grönholm, Ryan Iseppi, Jens Balzer, Jeff Hayton, Alexander Carpenter, Marcus Barnes, Alex Harden	2022	978-1-009-00527-2	
the Lied	**James Parsons**, Jane K. Brown, Amanda Glauert, Marie-Agnes Dittrich, Ruth O. Bingham, Jürgen Thym, James Deaville, Rena Charnin Mueller, Heather Platt, Susan Youens, Christopher H. Gibbs, James L. Zychowicz, David Gramit, Graham Johnson	2004	978-0-521-80471-4	
Liszt	**Kenneth Hamilton**, Katharine Ellis, Alexander Rehding, James Deaville, James M. Baker, Anna Celenza, Monika Hennemann, Reeves Shulstad, Dolores Pesce	2005	978-0-521-64462-4	
The Magic Flute	Jessica Waldoff	2023	978-1-108-44684-6	
Mahler	**Jeremy Barham**, Peter Franklin, Morten Solvik, Vera Micznik, Zoltan Roman, Peter Revers, Stephen E. Hefling, Christian Wildhagen, Jörg Rothkamm, Herta Blaukopf, David Pickett, Christoph Metzger, Reinhold Kubik, Stephen Downes, Lewis M. Smoley, John Williamson	2007	978-0-521-54033-9	
Medieval Music	**Mark Everist**, Susan Boynton, Michael McGrade, Sarah Fuller, Elizabeth Eva Leach, Peter Lefferts, Marco Gozzi, Nicolas Bell, Robert Curry, Sam Barrett, Ardis Butterfield, Leofranc Holford-Strevens, Rebecca Baltzer, Dolores Pesce, Emma Dillon, Christopher Page, Lawrence Earp	2011	978-0-521-60861-9	
Mendelssohn	**Peter Mercer-Taylor**, Michael P. Steinberg, Marian Wilson-Kimber, James Garratt, Greg Vitercik, Douglass Seaton, Steve Lindeman, Thomas Schmidt-Beste, Glenn Stanley, R. Larry Todd, Susan Youens, Monika Hennemann, John Michael Cooper, Leon Botstein	2004	978-0-521-53342-3	
Metal Music	**Jan-Peter Herbst**, Andrew L. Cope, Mark Mynett, Niall Thomas, Hale Fulya Çelikel, Duncan Williams, Peter Pichler, Jeremy J. Swist, Imke von Helden, Paula Rowe, Rosemary Lucy Hill, Catherine Hoad, Karl Spracklen, Daniel Suer, Thomas Cardwell, Ross Hagen, Lewis F. Kennedy, Owen Coggins, Mark Marrington, Eric Smialek, Pierre Hecker, Jeremy Wallach, Edward Banchs, Nelson Varas-Díaz, Daniel Nevárez Araújo, Samuel Vallen	2023	978-1-108-99398-2	
Michael Tippett	**Kenneth Gloag**, **Nicholas Jones**, Jonathan Rees, Arnold Whittall, Christopher Mark, Suzanne Cole, Joanna Bullivant, Suzanne Robinson, Thomas Schuttenhelm, Iain Stannard, Edward Venn, Alastair Borthwick	2013	978-1-107-60613-5	
Monteverdi	**John Whenham**, **Richard Wistreich**, Anthony Pryer, Tim Carter, Geoffrey Chew, Roger Bowers, Paola Besutti, Massimo Ossi, Joachim Steinheuer, Jeffrey Kurtzman, Iain Fenlon, Ellen Rosand, Suzanne Cusick, Richard Wistreich	2008	978-0-521-69798-9	
Mozart	**Simon P. Keefe**, Cliff Eisen, Dorothea Link, Ian Woodfield, David Schroeder, W. Dean Sutcliffe, Paul Corneilson, Edmund J. Goehring, Julian Rushton, David J. Buch, John Daverio, Jan Smaczny, William Stafford, Katalin Komlós, Robert D. Levin	2003	978-0-521-00192-2	
Musical	**William Everett**, **Paul R. Laird**, Katherine K. Preston, John Koegel, Orly Leah Krasner, John Graziano, Geoffrey Block, John Snelson, Ann Sears, Thomas L. Riis, Bruce D. Mcclung, Jim Lovensheimer, Scott Warfield, Paul Prece, Judith Sebesta, Bud Coleman, Graham Wood, Jessica Sternfeld	2008; 1st ed. 2015; 2nd ed. 2017; 3rd ed.	978-0-521-86238-7 978-0-521-68084-4 978-1-107-53529-9	
Music and Romanticism	**Benedict Taylor**, Keith Chapin, Miranda Stanyon, Thomas Peattie, Matthew Gelbart, Katherine Hambridge, John Tresch, Francesca Brittan, James Garratt, Tomás McAuley, Alexander Wilfing, Holly Watkins, Karen Leistra-Jones, Julian Horton, Steven Vande Moortele, Lisa Feurzeig, Sarah Hibberd, Dana Gooley, Nicole Grimes, Sebastian Wedler	2021	978-1-108-46687-5	
Music in Digital Culture	**Nicholas Cook**, Monique M. Ingalls, David Trippett, Lee Marshall, Martin Scherzinger, Ingrid Monson, K. E. Goldschmitt, Nick Seaver, Ben Sinclair, Stéphan-Eloïse Gras, Sumanth S. Gopinath, Jason Stanyek, Adam Harper, Peter McMurray, Mariana Lopez, Graham St John, Alan Blackwell, Sam Aaron, Alex McLean, Paul Sanden, Andrew McPherson, Steve Savage, Julio d'Escriván, Stephen Baysted, Isabella van Elferen, Frances Dyson, Shzr Ee Tan	2019	978-1-316-61407-5	
Operetta	**Anastasia Belina**, **Derek B. Scott**, John Kendrick, Lisa Feurzeig, Bruno Bower, Lynn Hooker, Jan Smaczy, Stefan Frey, Christopher Webber, Raymond Knapp, Pentti Paavolainen, Avra Xepapadakou, Micaela Baranello, Tobias Becker, Valeria De Lucca, Matthias Kauffmann	2019	978-1-316-63334-2	
Opera Studies	**Nicholas Till**, Thomas Ertman, Nicholas Payne, Christopher Morris, Susan Rutherford, Simon Williams, Nicholas Ridout, Laurel E. Zeiss, Alessandra Campana, Heather Hadlock, Suzanne Aspden	2012	978-0-521-67169-9	
the Orchestra	Tim Carter, Erik Levi, Robert Barclay, Peter Laki, Richard Rastall, Julian Rushton, Jeremy Siepman, Jon Tolanski, **Colin Lawson**, John Rushby-Smith, Simon Channing, Clive Gillinson, Jonathan Vaughan, Robert Philip, Robert Saxton, Sue Knussen, Stephen Cottrell	2003	978-0-521-00132-8	
the Organ	**Nicholas Thistlethwaite**, Stephen Bicknell, John Mainstone, Christopher Kent, Kimberly Marshall, Edward Higginbottom, Christopher Stembridge, James Dalton, Geoffrey Cox, Patrick Russill, **Geoffrey Webber**, David Yearsley, Graham Barber, Gerard Brooks, Andrew McCrea, Douglas Reed	1999	978-0-521-57584-3	
Percussion	**Russell Hartenberger**, William L. Cahn, William Moersch, Garry Kvistad, Rick Mattingly, Thomas Brett, Adam Sliwinski, Colin Currie, Aiyun Huang, Steven Schick, Bob Becker, Jason Treuting, Steve Reich, Peter Erskine, Steven F. Pond, Jeff Packman, B. Michael Williams, Michael B. Bakan, Michael Schutz, John R. Iversen	2016	978-1-107-47243-3	
the Piano	**David Rowland**, Kenneth Hamilton, Robert Philip, Bernard Richardson, Dorothy de Val, Cyril Ehrlich, J. Barrie Jones, Mervyn Cooke, Brian Priestley	1998	978-0-521-47986-8	
Pop and Rock	**Simon Frith**, Paul Théberge, **Will Straw**, Keir Keightley, Russel A. Potter, Jocelyne Guilbault, Richard Middleton, Sara Cohen, **John Street**, Barry Shank, Jan Fairley	2001	978-0-521-55660-6	
Ravel	**Deborah Mawer**, Barbara L. Kelly, Robert Orledge, Roy Howat, Mark DeVoto, Michael Russ, Peter Kaminsky, Richard Langham Smith, Ronald Woodley, Roger Nichols	2000	978-0-521-64856-1	
Recorded Music	**Nicholas Cook**, **Eric Clarke**, **Daniel Leech-Wilkinson**, **John Rink**, Susan Tomes, Peter Hill, Donald Greig, Mike Howlett, Steve Savage, Andrew Blake, Jonathan Freeman-Attwood, Michael Haas, Albin Zak, Martyn Ware, Richard Witts, Louise Meintjes, Tully Potter, Arild Bergh, Tia DeNora, Martin Elste, David Patmore, Lewis Foreman, George Brock-Nannestad, Roger Beardsley, Nigel Simeone, Simon Trezise, Ted Kendall, Nick Mason, Roger Heaton, Colin Lawson, Simon Frith, Chris Watson, Georgina Born	2009	978-0-521-68461-3	
the Recorder	**John Mansfield Thomson**, Daniël Brüggen, Howard Mayer Brown, **Anthony Rowland-Jones**, Adrienne Simpson, David Lasocki, Eve O'Kelly, Clifford Bartlett	1995	978-0-521-35816-3	
Rossini	**Emanuele Senici**, Richard Osborne, Benjamin Walton, Charles S. Brauner, Paolo Fabbri, Philip Gossett, Marco Beghelli, Damien Colas, Heather Hadlock, Janet Johnson, Cormac Newark, Leonella Grasso Caprioli, Mercedes Viale Ferrero, Patricia B. Brauner	2004	978-0-521-00195-3	
Rhythm	**Russell Hartenberger**, **Ryan McClelland**, Daniel Cameron, Jessica Grahn, Alan Dodson, Steven Schick, David Robertson, Harald Krebs, Gretchen Horlacher, Adam Sliwinski, Matthew W. Butterfield, Trevor de Clercq, Mitchell Ohriner, David Locke, James Kippen, Leslie Tilley, Peter Manuel, Kristina F. Nielsen, Nick Collins	2020	978-1-108-73012-9	
the Saxophone	**Richard Ingham**, Thomas Liley, Don Ashton, Thomas Dryer-Beers, Kyle Horch, David Roach, Nick Turner, Stephen Trier, Gordon Lewin, Chris 'Snake' Davis, John Helliwell, Claude Delangle, Jean-Denis Michat	1999	978-0-521-59666-4	
Serialism	**Martin Iddon**, Catherine Nolans, Marcus Zagorski, Arnold Whittall, Jack Boss, Silvio Dos Santos, Sebastian Wedler, Andrew Mead, Catherine Losada, Imke Misch, Angela Ida de Benedictis, Veniero Rizzardi, Maureen Carr, Mark Delaere, Emily Abrams Ansari, Iwona Lindstedt, Peter J. Schmelz, Björn Heile, Nancy Yunhwa Rao, Peter O'Hagan, Charles Wilson, Jennifer Iverson	2023	978-1-108-71686-4	
Seventeenth-Century Opera	Barbara Russano Hanning, Tim Carter, Sara Elisa Stangalino, Margaret Murata, Beth L. Glixon, Colleen Reardon, Christine Jeanneret, Rebecca Harris-Warrick, Roger Savage, Laura Naudeix, **Jacqueline Waeber**, Amanda Eubanks Winkler, Michael Maul, Louise K. Stein	2022	978-0-521-53046-0	
Schoenberg	**Jennifer Shaw**, **Joseph Auner**, Walter Frisch, Michael Cherlin, Robert P. Morgan, Craig De Wilde, Elizabeth Keathley, Ethan Haimo, Julian Johnson, Richard Kurth, Joy H. Calico, Peter Tregear, Steven J. Cahn, Severine Neff, Walter B. Bailey, Sabine Feisst, Richard Toop	2010	978-0-521-69086-7	
Schubert	**Christopher Gibbs**, Leon Botstein, David Gramit, Charles Rosen, Susan Youens, Kristina Muxfeldt, Margaret Notley, William Kinderman, Martin Chusid, L. Michael Griffel, Glenn Stanley, Thomas A. Denny, John Reed, Xavier Hascher, David Montgomery	1997	978-0-521-48424-4	
Schubert's Winterreise	**Marjorie W. Hirsch**, **Lisa Feurzeig**, Andrea Lindmayr-Brandl, Kristina Muxfeldt, Rufus Hallmark, David Romand, Blake Howe, George S. Williamson, James William Sobaskie, Susan Wollenberg, Xavier Hascher, Deborah Stein, Benjamin Binder, Laura Tunbridge	2021	978-1-108-96580-4	
Schumann	**Beate Perry**, Ulrich Tadday, Nicholas Marston, John Daverio, Laura Tunbridge, Jonathan Dunsby, Linda Roesner, Scott Burnham, Joseph Kerman, Elizabeth Paley, Reinhard Kapp, Jörn Peter Hiekel	2007	978-0-521-78950-9	
Shostakovich	**Pauline Fairclough**, **David Fanning**, Eric Roseberry, Judy Kuhn, David Haas, Malcolm MacDonald, Gerard McBurney, Rosamund Bartlett, Marina Ilichova, John Riley, Francis Maes, Erik Levi, Esti Sheinberg	2008	978-0-521-60315-7	
Sibelius	**Daniel Grimley**, David M. Grimley, Matti Huttunen, Glenda Dawn Goss, Stephen Downes, Jukka Tiilikainen, Arnold Whittall, James Hepokoski, Jeffrey Kallberg, Veijo Murtomäki, Ilkka Oramo, Tomi Mäkelä, Peter Franklin, Julian Anderson, Bethany Lowe, Sir Colin Davis, Osmo Vänskä	2004	978-0-521-89460-9	
the Singer-Songwriter	**Katherine Williams**, Justin A. Williams, David R. Shumway, Natasha Loges, Katy Hamilton, Mark Finch, Allan F. Moore, Simon Barber, Christa Bentley, Michael Borshuk, Tōru Mitsui, Josep Pedro, Jada Watson, Phil Allcock, Joshua S. Duchan, Timothy Koozin, Lori Burns, Alyssa Woods, Marc Lafrance, Madison Moore, Sarah Suhdolnik, Jo Collinson-Scott, Kevin Fellezs, Jennifer Taylor, Chris McDonald, Megan Berry, Sarah Boak, Mark Marrington, Marcus Aldredge, Rupert Till, Nick Braae, Franco Fabbri, Ioannis Tsioulakis, Lucy Bennett	2016	978-1-107-68091-3	
Singing	**John Potter**, John Schaefer, Richard Middleton, David Toop, Stephen Banfield, John Rosselli, Stephen Varcoe, Timothy Day, Neely Bruce, Heikki Liimola, Joseph Dyer, Richard Wistreich, Linda Hirst, David Wright, David Mason, Felicity Laurence, Johan Sundberg	2000	978-0-521-62709-2	
Richard Strauss	**Charles Youmans**, James Deaville, Walter Werbeck, Wayne Heisler, David Larkin, James Hepokoski, Morten Kristiansen, Bryan Gilliam, Philip Graydon, Susan Youens, Jürgen May, Alex Ross, Günter Brosche, Michael Walter, Scott Warfield, Raymond Holden	2010	978-0-521-72815-7	
Stravinsky	Rosamund Bartlett, Christopher Butler, Arnold Whittall, Anthony Pople, Kenneth Gloag, Martha Hyde, **Jonathan Cross**, Joseph N. Straus, Nicholas Cook, Max Paddison, Craig Ayrey, Stuart Campbell, Louis Andriessen, Richard Taruskin	2003	978-0-521-66377-9	
the String Quartet	Christina Bashford, **Robin Stowell**, Tully Potter, David Waterman, Simon Standage, David Wyn Jones, W. Dean Sutcliffe, Stephen E. Hefling, Jan Smaczny, Kenneth Gloag, Colin Lawson	2003	978-0-521-00042-0	
the Symphony	**Julian Horton**, John Irving, Mary Sue Morrow, David Brodbeck, David Fanning, Michael Spitzer, Simon P. Keefe, Mark Anson-Cartwright, Steven Vande Moortele, Daniel M. Grimley, Richard Will, Mark Evan Bonds, John Williamson, Pauline Fairclough, Alain Frogley, Alan Street	2013	978-0-521-71195-1	
The Rolling Stones	**John Covach**, Bill Janovitz, **Victor Coelho**, Paul Harris, Ralph Maier, Daniel Beller-Mckenna, Brita Renée Heimarck, Michael Brendan Baker, Philippe Puicouyoul	2019	978-1-107-65111-1	
Twentieth-Century Opera	Nigel Simeone, Arnold Whittall, John Deathridge, Virgilio Bernardoni, Caroline Harvey, Philip Weller, Alan Street, Christopher Walton, Nigel Simeone, Guido Heldt, Rachel Beckles Willson, Marina Frolova-Walker, Elise K. Kirk, Christopher Mark, Robert Adlington, Arved Ashby, **Mervyn Cooke**, Stephen Banfield, Nicholas Payne, Tom Sutcliffe	2006	978-0-521-78393-4	
Vaughan Williams	**Alain Frogley**, **Aidan J. Thomson**, Julian Onderdonk, Byron Adams, Sophie Fuller, Charles Edward McGuire, Eric Saylor, Christopher Mark, Julian Horton, David Manning, Jenny Doctor, Michael Kennedy	2013	978-0-521-16290-6	
Verdi	Mary Jane Phillips-Matz, Alessandro Roccatagliati, Mary Ann Smart, **Scott L. Balthazar**, Fabrizio della Seta, Emanuele Senici, Andreas Giger, Steven Huebner, David Kimbell, Roberta Montemorra Marvin, Rosa Solinas, Cormac Newark, Harold Powers, Luke Jensen, Gregory Harwood	2004	978-0-521-63535-6	
Video Game Music	Lydia Andrew, **Melanie Fritsch**, **Tim Summers**, James Newman, Kenneth B. McAlpine, Lyman Gamberton, Guy Michelmore, Richard Stevens, K.J. Donnelly, Rob Bridgett, Ben Babbitt, Michael Austin, Michiel Kamp, Elizabeth Medina-Gray, Steven Reale, Iain Hart, Mark Grimshaw-Aagaard, Dana Plank, Duncan Williams, Chris Tonelli, James Cook, William Gibbons, Hillegonda C. Rietveld, Andrew Lemon, Andra Ivănescu, Ryan Thompson, Thomas Böcker	2021	978-1-108-46089-7	
the Violin	John Dilworth, Bernard Richardson, Simon McVeigh, **Robin Stowell**, Eric Wen, Adrian Eales, Paul Zukofsky, Peter Allsop, Peter Cooke, Max Harrison	1993	978-0-521-39923-4	
Wagner	**Thomas S. Grey**, John Deathridge, Mitchell Cohen, Stewart Spencer, Barry Millington, John Daverio, Stephen McClatchie, Glenn Stanley, James Treadwell, Dieter Borchmeyer, Annegret Fauser, Pamela Potter, Mike Ashman, Arnold Whittall	2008	978-0-521-64439-6	
Wagner's Der Ring des Nibelungen	**Mark Berry**, **Nicholas Vazsonyi**, Jason Geary, Stefan Arvidsson, Arnold Whittall, J. P. Harper-Scott, Christian Thorau, Roger Allen, Anthony Arblaster, Thomas Grey, Chris Walton, Barbara Eichner, David Trippett, Tash Siddiqui, Adrian Daub, Barry Millington	2020	978-1-107-51947-3	
Women in Music since 1900	**Laura Hamer**, Sophie Fuller, Rhiannon Mathias, Elaine Kelly, Astrid Kvalbein, Francesca Placanica, Elizabeth Hoffman, Tammy L. Kernodle, Jacqueline Warwick, Katherine Williams, Michael Brocken, Kristin J. Lieb, Virginia Kettle, Louis Niebur, Margaret Schedel, Flannery Cunningham, Manuella Blackburn, Robert Legg, Clare K. Duffin, Steph Power, Victoria Armstrong	2021	978-1-108-45578-7	
