= Shelly Knotts =

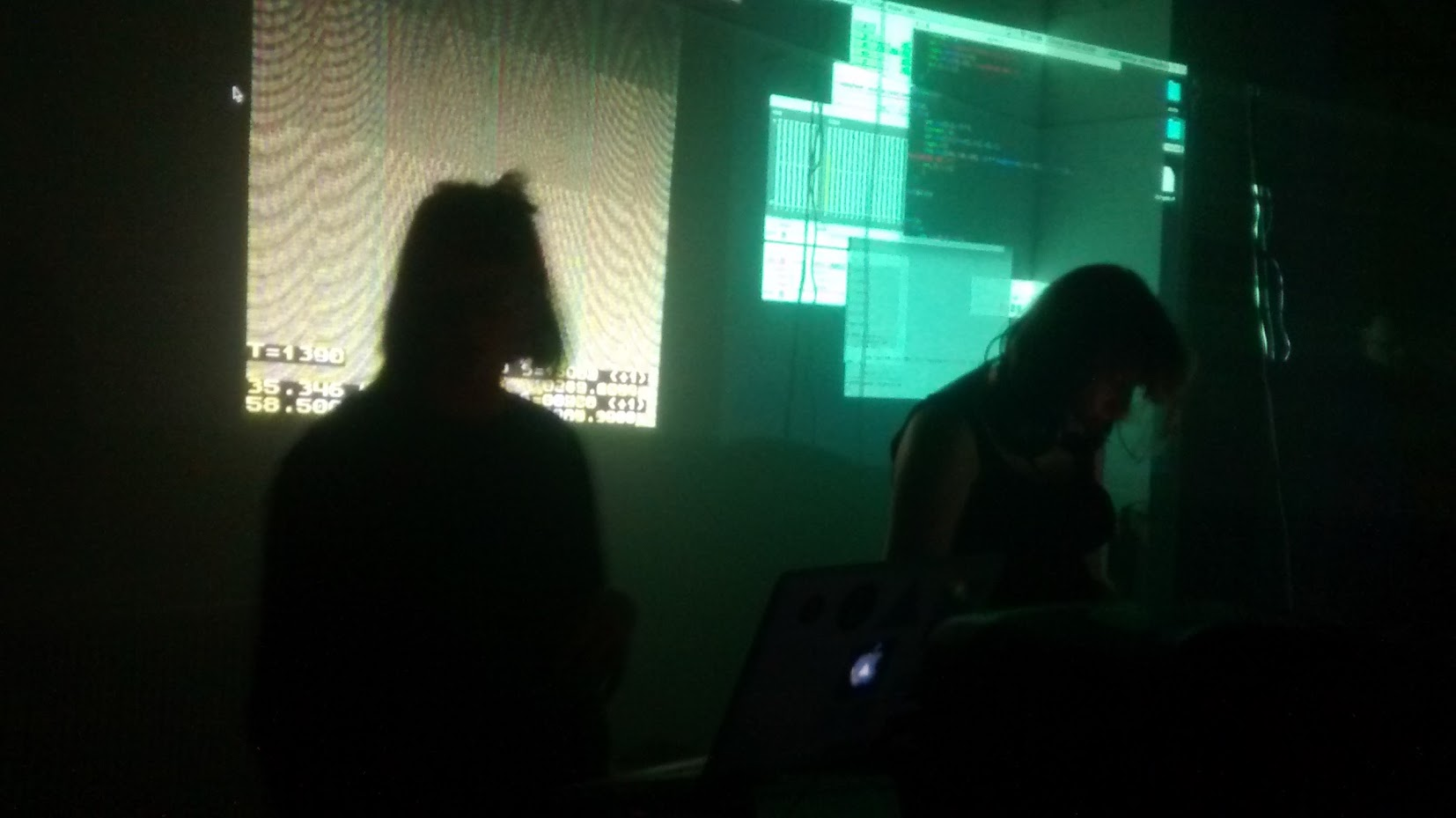

Background information
- Origin: United Kingdom
- Genres: Networked music performance, Algorave
- Website: datamusician.net

Shelly Knotts is a composer, performer and improvisor of live electronic, live coded and network music based in Newcastle upon Tyne, England. She performs internationally, often using Live coding techniques, and a range of styles including Noise, Drone and Algorave.

She often collaborates on performance, including a PRS for Music commission with Annie Mahtani, an audio/visual collaboration Sisesta Pealkiri with Alo Allik, uiaesk! with Holger Ballweg, Algobabez with Joanne Armitage, and as part of the Birmingham Laptop Ensemble. Her work often has a political dimension, using network music to explore social structures, and live coding to explore failure as an alternative to virtuosity, as well as exploring and encouraging diversity through workshops and hackathons. Knotts has also engaged with computer science in schools, through a Sonic Pi commission and BBC Live lesson.

Knotts is also active in event curation, including organising several Algorave events in Newcastle, three editions of the international Network Music Festival, chairing the Live Coding and Collaboration symposium in 2014, and chairing the artistic programme of the International Conference on Live coding in 2015. She was recognised as part of the Sound and Music New Voices cohort in 2014-2015, which aims to raise the profile for artists who exist outside of the support of commercial publishers or record companies, although she has been published by Leonardo Music Journal, ChordPunch, and Absenceofwax. In 2018 she completed a PhD in Live Computer Music at Durham University, supervised by Nick Collins and Peter Manning, with funding from the Department of Music and Hatfield College. She is currently a postdoctoral associate at the same institution.
