= Unfolding Object =

- Artist: John F. Simon Jr.
- Year: 2002
- Collection: Solomon R. Guggenheim Museum
- Website: unfoldingobject.guggenheim.org

Unfolding Object is a 2002 work of internet art created by John Simon after a commission from the Solomon R. Guggenheim Museum in New York City. Along with net.flag by Mark Napier, it was among the first pieces of internet art to be collected by a major museum.

Simon has described Unfolding Object as "an endless book that rewrites itself and whose use dictates its content." It begins as a blank square visible on a web page hosted on the museum's website, but responds when clicked by visitors to the site. Gradually the square unfolds, click by click, until it reaches a certain point, after which it begins to close. The "pages" of the design are programmed to respond differently as they receive more clicks; vertical, horizontal, and diagonal lines denote different numbers of previous clicks. The colors of the square and of its background are both programmed to change hourly.
