= Alex McLean =

British musician and researcher (born 1975)

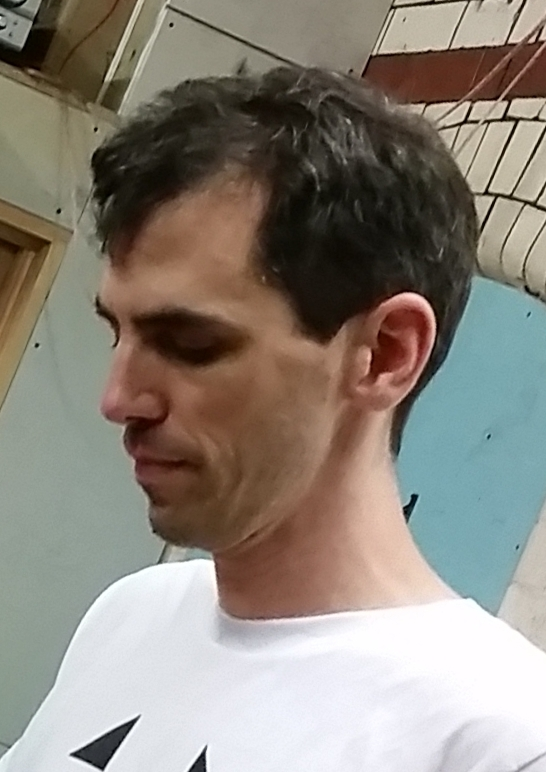
- Alex McLean, in 2015.
- Born: 1975 (age 50–51)
- Other name: Yaxu
- Occupations: Musician, Researcher
- Known for: Live coding, TidalCycles, TOPLAP, Algorave

Alex McLean (born 1975) is a British musician and researcher. He is notable for his key role in developing live coding as a musical practice, including for creating TidalCycles, a live-coding environment that allows programmer musicians to code simply and quickly, and for coining the term Algorave with Nick Collins.

He is an active and influential member of the live coding community; he is a co-founder of TOPLAP and joint leader of the Live Coding Research Network. Alex is co-founder of the Chordpunch record label

McLean is also known for his work in software art, winning the Transmediale award for software art in 2002 for forkbomb.pl, a short Perl script which creates a unique image from an operating system under heavy load, and co-founding the runme.org software art repository with Olga Goriunova, Amy Alexander and Alexei Shulgin in 2003, which received an honorary mention in the Prix Ars Electronica netvision category in 2004.

Alex McLean performs as a solo artist under the moniker Yaxu and is also a member of the live coding bands Slub and Canute. He has also collaborated with Kate Sicchio in combining live coding and live choreography.

During 2016, McLean was sound artist in residence at the Open Data Institute, as part of the Sound and Music embedded programme.

== Discography ==
=== EPs ===
- Peak Cut (Computer Club; 30 March 2015)
- Broken (Chordpunch; 2011)
