= Adrian Ward (artist) =

English artist (born 1976)

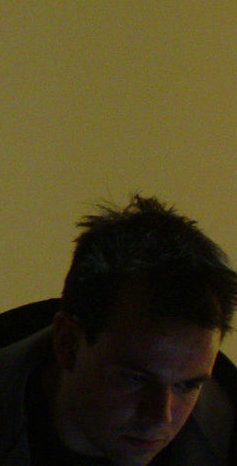
Adrian ward at Changing Grammars, Hamburg 2004

Adrian Ward (born 1976 in Bishop Auckland, England) is a software artist and musician. He is known for his generative art software products released through his company Signwave, and as one third of the techno gabba ambient group, Slub. His theoretical approach to generative and software art guides his practice, including contributing to the early principles of the livecoding movement.

Adrian co-won the 2001 Transmediale software art award in Berlin, alongside Netochka Nezvanova for his well-known Auto-Illustrator parody of Adobe Illustrator, off-the-shelf generative software that takes control over the artwork produced with it. Auto-Illustrator has earned prestigious digital arts awards including an honorary mention at the 2001 Prix Ars Electronica. He is also a board member of the UK Museum of Ordure, an ongoing collaborative art project with Stuart Brisley and Geoff Cox.
