= IDAT =

IDAT, iDAT, or i-DAT may refer to one of the following:

- International Dance and Technology Conference
- IDAT, ("image data") a part of the Portable Network Graphics (png) format
