= Soddu (disambiguation) =

Soddu may refer to:

== People ==
- Andrea Soddu (born 1974), Italian politician
- Celestino Soddu (born 1945), an Italian architect.
- Pietro Soddu (born 1929), former President of Sardinia
- Ubaldo Soddu (1883–1949), an Italian Army general during World War II.

== Places ==
- Sodo (also Sodo), a town in Ethiopia.
- Soddu Airport serving the Soddu area of Ethiopia.
