= Kate Sicchio =

American choreographer and artist

Dr Kate Sicchio
- Education: PhD, University of East London
- Known for: Choreography, Dance, Live coding, E-textiles, Media Art
- Movement: Dance Tech, Algorave
- Website: sicchio.com

Kate Sicchio is a choreographer and digital artist, notable for her work bringing together choreography, dance technology, e-textiles, and live coding performance. She is also active as curator and event organiser in the digital arts.

Sicchio's choreographic work often develops and applies live coding techniques to create instructions followed by human dancers, whether through text-based instructions, diagrams, or e-textile actuators designed into the dancers' costumes. She also live codes music, and organises events within the Algorave community.

In her academic life, Sicchio worked as assistant professor of integrated digital media at New York University until 2018, when she joined Virginia Commonwealth University as assistant professor of dance and media technologies in the dance and choreography and kinetic imaging departments. Prior to this, Sicchio left her home in Philadelphia in 2004 to study for her MA Digital Performance and the University of Hull UK to then go onto teach Dance & Digital Performance at University Centre, Doncaster, UK from 2005-2008 and Dance at the University of East London UK from 2008-2010, and then Dance at the University of Lincoln UK from 2010-2015, before moving back to the US. Sicchio received her PhD at the University of East London with her practice-based research on the use of real-time video systems within live choreography and the conceptual framework of ‘choreotopology’ a way to describe this work. Her supervisor was Steve Goodman (also known as Kode9).

Sicchio has been involved in the ongoing performance research collaboration with Camille Baker from 2011 called Hacking the Body and HTB 2.0, involving "hacking" the data from the body to create new forms of choreography. This work highlighted the collection of personal data by corporate and government entities, through the development of bespoke wearable devices and e-textile costumes to create unique movement and choreographic investigations.
