= Peter Manning =

Peter or Pete Manning may refer to:

- Peter Manning (conductor) (born 1956), British conductor and violinist
- Peter K. Manning (born 1940), American sociologist
- Peter Manning (footballer) (born 1946), former Australian rules footballer
- Pete Manning (gridiron football) (1937–2019), American and Canadian football player
- Peter Manning (musicologist) (1948–2022), British musicologist
- Pete Manning, character in Alibi
