= Generativity (technology) =

Capacity of technology to encourage and support creativity

The term generativity was coined by Jonathan Zittrain in 2006, drawing on the existing notion of generative systems, to refer to the ability of a technology platform or technology ecosystem to create, generate or produce new output, structure or behavior without input from the originator of the system.

The term has been adopted by people who deal with technology, first used by Johnathan Zittrain in 2006. Generativity in technology is defined as “the ability of a technology platform or technology ecosystem to create, generate or produce new output, structure or behavior without input from the originator of the system.” An example of this could be any computing platform, such as the iOS and Android mobile operating systems, for which other developers have created millions of unique applications. It has been argued that the open Internet is both an inspiration of generativity and a means to spread the products of generativity. However, some people including Johnathan Zittrain fear that society and technology are moving away from a generative internet, claiming “A shift in consumer priorities from generativity to stability will compel undesirable responses from regulators and markets and, if unaddressed, could prove decisive in closing today’s open computing environments.”

== Zittrain's definition ==
Generativity in technology refers to cases where a technology supports the creation of novel products. Such technologies are referred to as generative systems. Canonical examples are the personal computer and the Internet. From its inception, the Internet has acted as a generative force allowing users to create and communicate in ways unimagined but foreseen by its creators who for this purpose built-in an openness and hardware and software agnosticism.

Zittrain was first to apply this term in a generalized sense, to cases where a generative technology leads to "unanticipated change through unfiltered contributions from broad and varied audiences." Zittrain has also highlighted that precarious nature of generative technology: arguing that features which, for instance, may enhance security and stability may, even unintentionally reduce or destroy a generativity in a system. He highlighted cases in which apparently innocuous producer, consumer, and government actions from a move away from PCs to one-way systems such as "smart" appliances cause a decline in generativity. As a result, he emphasised the need to be clear about treating generativity, rather than apparent means supporting this as the key valued characteristic of the system. In the case of the internet/PC complex this is its capacity as a generative networked grid, rather than traits associated with this, such as "open internet" or "network neutrality". He termed a focus on these mere-means to the end of generativity a "myopic" "end-to-end theory" which confused means with ends. Zittrain argued,

focusing on "network" without regard to a particular network policy's influence on the design of network endpoints such as PCs. As a result of this focus, political advocates of end-to-end are too often myopic; many writers seem to presume current PC and OS architecture to be fixed in an "open" position. If they can be persuaded to see a larger picture, they may agree to some compromises at the network level. If complete fidelity to end-to-end network neutrality persists, our PCs may be replaced by information appliances or may undergo a transformation from open platforms to gated communities to prisons, creating a consumer information environment that betrays the very principles that animate end-to-end theory. ( p. 1978)
