= Net.flag =

net.flag is a work of internet art created in 2002 by Mark Napier. Along with Unfolding Object by John Simon, it was commissioned by the Solomon R. Guggenheim Museum in New York City, and was among the first works of internet art to enter the permanent collection of a major museum.

net.flag is an interactive work hosted on the Guggenheim museum's website. The site contains images of all the national flags of the world. Each flag is broken into its respective components, that are categorized according to several broadly descriptive terms. Users may pick and choose from a menu of these components to form a new flag, which they may then save to the site. In addition, the project features a browsable history, through which users may look over past creations that have been titled and saved by the previous participants.

net.flag creates a virtual territory. A limited language of visual symbols and the actions of thousands of visitors create an ongoing micro-drama about ownership, territory, control and personal identity in a post-national world.

Napier has described net.flag as "an emblem for the Internet as a new territory," and is inspired in part by "Mr. Lee's Greater Hong Kong", the franchise nation depicted in Snow Crash by Neal Stephenson. In Stephenson's world geographical borders are re-mapped into mobile, modular elements.
