= Joanne Armitage =

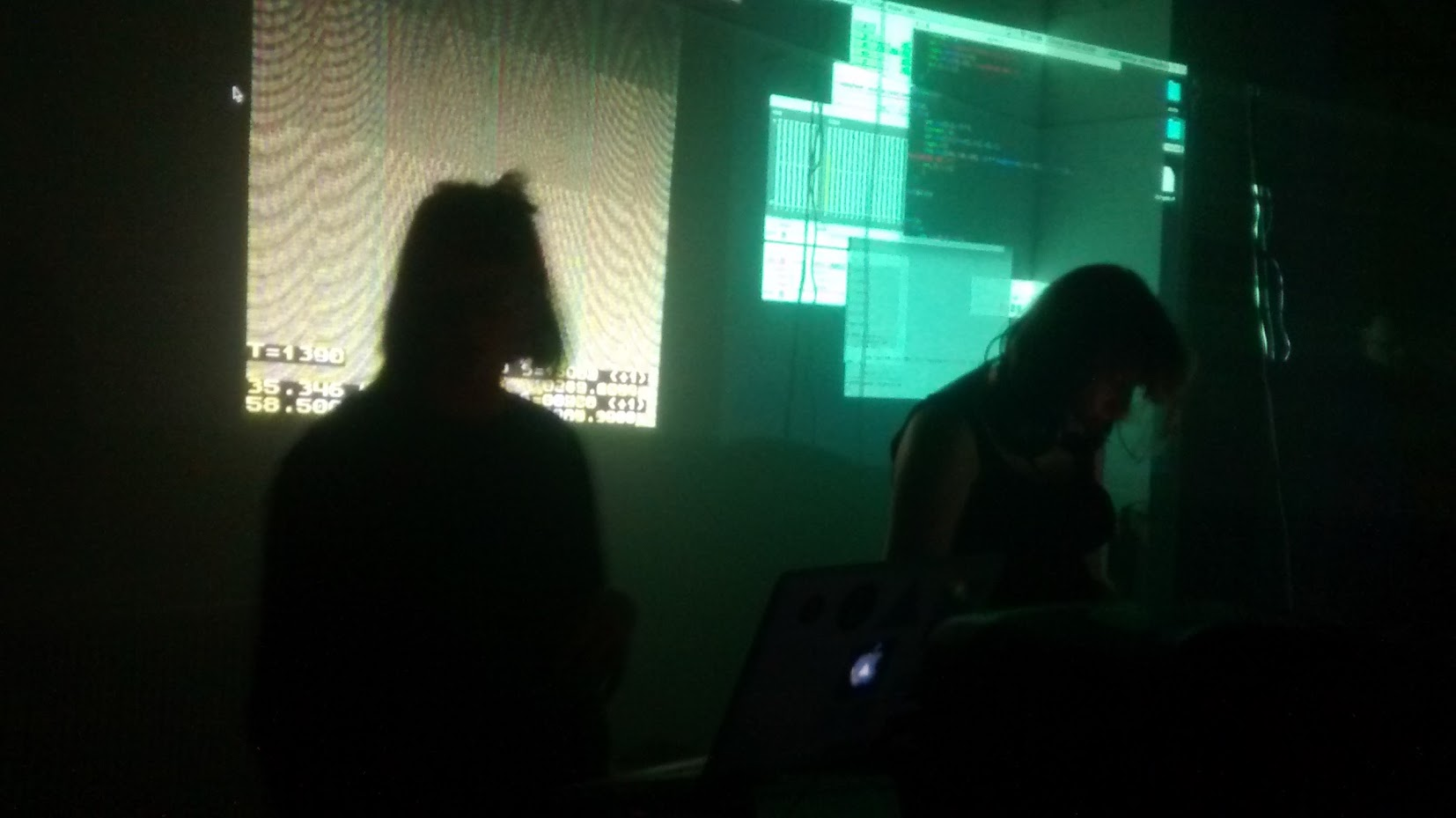

Background information
- Origin: United Kingdom
- Genres: Algorave
- Website: joannnne.github.io

Joanne Armitage is a composer, improviser and researcher based in Leeds, England, notable for her practice in live coded music, and research into haptics in music performance. She performs internationally using the SuperCollider language, including as half of live coding duo ALGOBABEZ with Shelly Knotts associated with the Algorave movement. Her music is often performed in a club setting, while embracing error and uncertainty. She is also known as advocate for diversity in music and technology, including through invited workshops. Armitage is a lecturer in Digital Media at the School of Media and Communication, University of Leeds, UK.
