= Computer-generated choreography =

Computer-generated choreography is the technique of using computers to generate choreography, particularly in real time, in the field of Dance technology. Notably, this field was forged by female choreographers, and remains dominated by women. Seminal figures in this space include:

- Dorothy Jeanne Hays Beaman (October 7, 1919 – February 12, 2020) was an American dancer and college professor. She was a pioneer of computational choreography, creating the piece Random Dances in 1964 by using an IBM 7070 computer to select and order movement instructions from three lists. Her 1965 article, "Computer Dance", was cited by later practitioners, as was a 1968 exhibition of her process at the Institute of Contemporary Arts in London.
