= Musa ludens =

Slovak chamber music group

Musa ludens is a chamber music group from Slovakia, founded in 1981. Their repertoire contains Slovak and European middle age music, incl. old Slavonic liturgic songs and music from gothic till late renaissance. At concerts they wear traditional costumes and play replicas of Music Instruments of that time. Their performances were recorded by Slovak national TV and independent film producers.

== Members ==
The group consists of 6 members, all have graduated at the music academy in Bratislava:

- Ján Pipta
- Ľudmila Piptová
- Alena Pitová
- Lucia Piptová
- Zuzana Piptová
- Igor Pasek
