= Dynamic painting =

Dynamic painting may refer to:

- Action painting
- Generative art which updates in real time
