= Slub (band) =

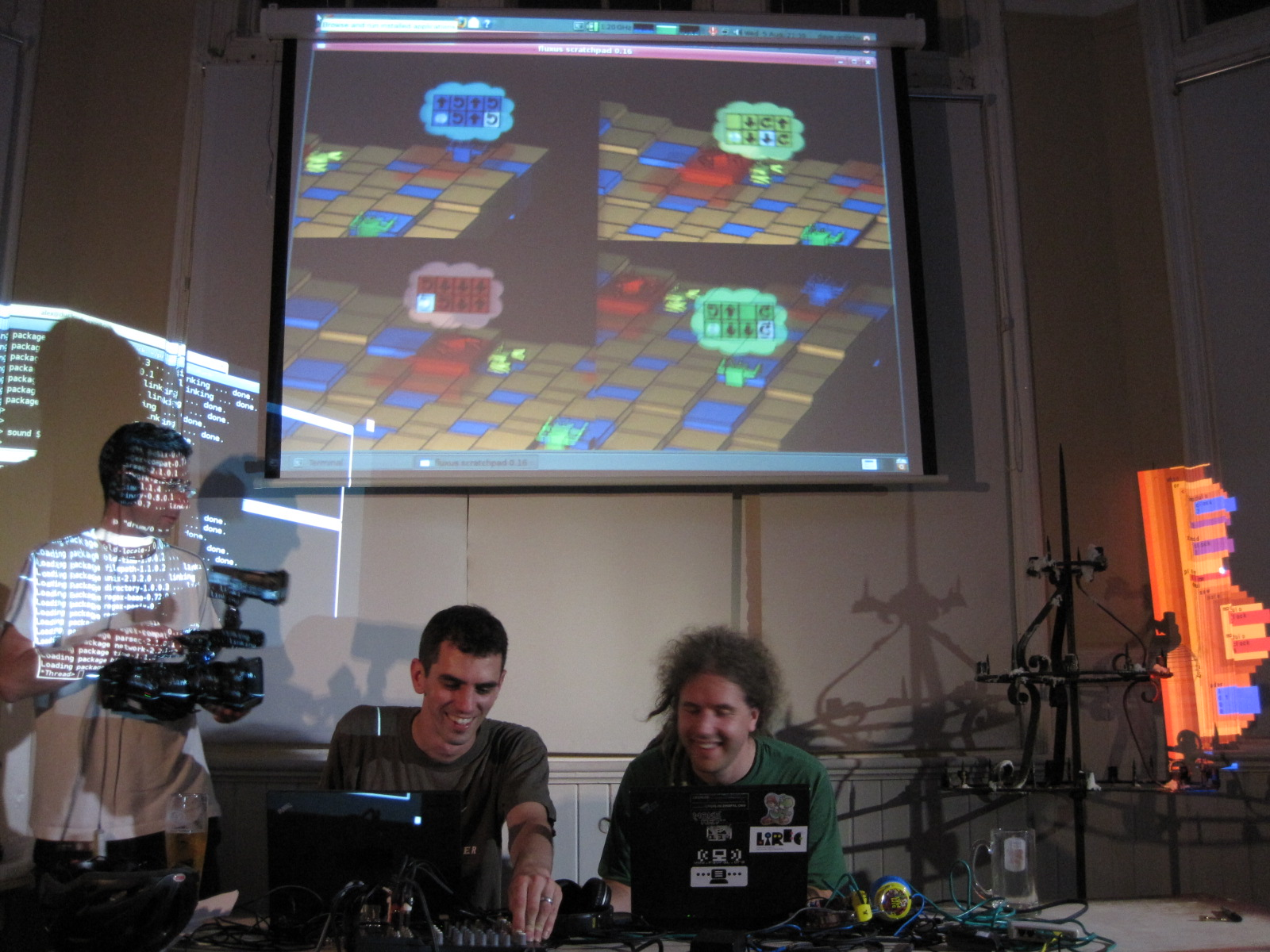
Dave and Alex of Slub performing live in London. The left screen shows one performer's CLI, the right shows the other performer's "Scheme bricks" coding interface, and the top shows a custom-made game environment through which audience members influence the music generation.

Slub is an algorave group formed in 2000 by Adrian Ward and Alex McLean, joined by Dave Griffiths in 2005 and Alexandra Cardenas in 2017. They are known for making their music exclusively from their own generative software, projecting their screens so their audience can see their handmade interfaces. Their music is improvised, and advertised as falling within the ambient gabba genre.

Since 2005 slub performances have been exclusively live coded, using a variety of different self-built language environments. Fluxus, a Scheme game engine; and Tidal, a pure functional DSL embedded in Haskell.

In 2011, while on the way to a gig, Alex McLean and Nick Collins invented the Algorave.
