= Antonio Roberts =

English artist

Antonio Roberts (also known as hellocatfood), is an English new media artist and curator based in Birmingham, notable for his work in the areas of glitch art, installation art and live coding performance, including live visuals and/or music performances at algoraves. His work often addresses themes around open-source software, free culture and copyright.

He was awarded a BOM Fellowship in 2016, a Near Now Fellowship in 2017, and July 2019 was announced as one of 15 artists appointed to a-n The Artists Information Company's 'Artists Council'.
