= Alexandra Cardenas =

Colombian composer

Alexandra Cárdenas
- Origin: Colombia
- Genres: Free improvisation, Algorave
- Years active: 2000–present
- Website: cargocollective.com/tiemposdelruido

Alexandra Cárdenas (born 1976) is a Colombian musician, composer and improviser now based in Berlin, who has followed a path from Western classical composition to improvisation and live electronics. Her recent work has included live coding performance, including performances at the forefront of the Algorave scene, she also co-organised a live coding community in Mexico City. At the 2014 Kurukshetra Festival, Cárdenas was a keynote speaker and hosted a music live coding workshop, the first of its kind in India. Cárdenas has been invited to talk about and perform live coding at events such as the Berlin based Transmediale festival and the Ableton sponsored Loop symposium, and held residencies including at Tokyo Wonder Site in Japan and Centre for the Arts in Mexico City.

She has studied in Bogota and Berlin and has completed a Masters Degree in Sound Studies and Sonic Arts. Cárdenas co-founded Livecodera, a collective working to nurture the skills of women live coders. She also co-founded Toplap Mexico and Toplap Berlin.

She has been featured in videos by governmental broadcast agencies.

== Musical releases ==
Cárdenas’ releases include;

- Unbroken EP 2018
- Hipersonica Album 2019
