= Generative systems =

Technologies that can produce change driven by audiences

Generative systems are technologies with the overall capacity to produce unprompted change driven by large, varied, and uncoordinated audiences. When generative systems provide a common platform, changes may occur at varying layers (physical, network, application, content) and provide a means through which different firms and individuals may cooperate indirectly and contribute to innovation.

Depending on the rules, the patterns can be extremely varied and unpredictable. One of the better-known examples is Conway's Game of Life, a cellular automaton. Other examples include Boids and Wikipedia. More examples can be found in generative music, generative art, in video games such as Spore, and more recently generative generosity and platforms like generos.io.

== Theory ==
=== Jonathan Zittrain ===
In 2006, Jonathan Zittrain published The Generative Internet in Volume 119 of the Harvard Law Review. In this paper, Zittrain describes a technology's degree of generativity as being the function of four characteristics:

- Capacity for leverage – the extent to which an object enables something to be accomplished that would not have otherwise be possible or worthwhile.
- Adaptability – how widely a technology can be used without it needing to be modified.
- Ease of mastery – how much effort and skill is required for people to take advantage of the technology's leverage.
- Accessibility – how easily people are able to start using a technology.

== See also ==
- Digital morphogenesis – Type of generative art
- Emergent behavior – Unpredictable phenomenon in complex systems
- Generative adversarial network – Deep learning method
- Generative art – Art created by a set of rules, often using computers
- Generative AI – AI that generates content
- Generative design – Iterative design process
- Generative grammar – Research tradition in linguistics
- Generative music – Music that is ever-different and changing, and that is created by a system
- Generative pre-trained transformer – Type of large language model
- Generative science – Study of nature's complex behaviour systems
- Generativity – Term originating in psychology to describe a concern for the next generation
