= Annina Ruest =

- Known for: Software art, art, new media art
- Notable work: A Piece of the Pie Chart, Be Counted, Discotrope, eRiceCooker
- Awards: LACMA ART+TECHNOLOGY Lab, Prix Ars Electronica Honorary Mention, Transmediale Software Award
- Website: anninaruest.com

Annina Ruest (also spelled Annina Rüst) is a Swiss artist-technologist and associate professor at the Harriet L. Wilkes Honors College at Florida Atlantic University. She is known for her work in new media art including software art and electronics-based art. Her works often focus on political issues within tech culture, including gender representation and online privacy.

== Biography ==
Ruest attended Zurich University of the Arts, graduating with a Diploma in Visual Communications with New Media Emphasis in 2003. She received a Master of Fine Arts in Visual Arts from University of California, San Diego in 2006 and a Master of Science in Media Arts and Sciences from Massachusetts Institute of Technology in 2008. In 2009 she joined the Department of Transmedia at Syracuse University where she was a tenured Associate Professor. In 2017 she left Syracuse University to join the Wilkes Honors College at Florida Atlantic University.

== Selected works ==
Ruest began working as a software artist while attending Zurich University of the Arts, independently and as a member of the software art collective LAN. Her more recent work has integrated electronics including eRiceCooker and Discotrope: The Secret Life of Solar Cells, a collaboration with Amy Alexander. Her works often focus on the role of gender in tech culture, including Be Counted, A Piece of the Pie Chart.,, Bad Mother / Good Mother. and Pac-Mom: A game about gender, work, and food insecurity
