= Pamela Weston =

British clarinetist

Pamela Theodora Weston (17 October 1921 – 9 September 2009) was a British clarinetist, teacher and writer.

Born in London, she attended Priors Field School. Following two years at the Royal Academy of Music she won a scholarship to the Guildhall School of Music before studying privately with the noted clarinetist Frederick Thurston. She was a professor of clarinet at the Guildhall from 1951 until 1969. She organised the International Clarinet Association Congress in 1984, the first ever held in the United Kingdom.

Weston's legacy continues in the form of a scholarship for clarinet research at doctoral level, available from the Royal College of Music, recognising the institution's pre-emininence in this area, across both practice and theory.

== Publications ==
Her first book, Clarinet Virtuosi of the Past, published in 1971, was followed by The Clarinet Teacher's Companion (1976), More Clarinet Virtuosi of the Past (1977), Clarinet Virtuosi of Today (1989) and Yesterday's Clarinettists: A Sequel (2002). She has also written for The Cambridge Companion to the Clarinet.

== Death ==
Suffering in her last years from debilitating myalgic encephalomyelitis, she travelled to Switzerland to undertake an assisted suicide at the age of 87 in 2009.
