= Middle age =

Midpoint of life

Middle age (or middle adulthood) is the age range of the years halfway between young adulthood and old age. The exact range is subject to public debate, but the term has been used to denote the age range from 40 to 64 years.

== Overall ==
This time span is generally referred to as "middle age" and can be defined as the time of ages about 40–45 to about 65–70. Many changes may occur between young adulthood and this stage. There is no universal consensus on what the exact definition of middle age is, but usual characteristics include the beginning of rapid decline of fertility, graying of hair, and other physical changes.

Those in middle age continue to develop relationships and adapt to changes in relationships. Such changes are highly evident in the maturing relationships between growing or grown children and aging parents. Community involvement is fairly typical of this stage of adulthood, as is continued career development.

== Physical characteristics ==
Middle-aged adults may begin to show visible signs of aging. This process can be more rapid in women who have osteoporosis. Changes might occur in the nervous system. The ability to perform complex tasks remains intact. In the typical range of 45 to 55, women experience menopause, which ends natural fertility. Menopause can have many side effects. Changes can occur to skin, and other changes may include a decline in physical fitness, including a reduction in aerobic performance, a decrease in maximal heart rate, and graying and loss of hair. Sensory sensitivity in middle-aged adults has been shown to be one of the lowest. These measurements are generalities, and people may exhibit changes at different rates and times.

Mortality rates can begin to increase, due mainly to health issues like heart problems, cancer, hypertension, and diabetes. Still, the majority of middle-aged people in industrialized nations can expect to live into old age.

Starting around age 40, pregnant women are considered to be of advanced maternal age, and significant declines in fertility begin to occur that usually end with menopause around age 50.

Middle-aged urban adults who are experiencing frailty and poverty show an association with increased H_{2}O_{2}-induced oxidative DNA damage.

== Cognitive ==
Erik Erikson refers to this period of adulthood as generativity versus stagnation, the seventh of eight stages of Erikson's stages of psychosocial development. People in middle age may experience some cognitive loss, which usually remains unnoticeable because life experiences and strategies get developed to compensate for any decrease in mental abilities.

During this stage, adults often strive to have things that will outlast them. Generativity, which is the concern and the commitment middle-aged people have for future generations, is a big part of development during this stage.

== Social and personality characteristics ==
For some, marital satisfaction remains intact, but other family relationships can become more difficult. Career satisfaction focuses more on inner satisfaction and contentedness and less on ambition and the desire to advance. Even so, career changes occur often. Middle age can be a time when people reexamine their lives by taking stock and evaluating their accomplishments. Morality may change and become more conscious. The perception that those in this stage of development of life undergo a so-called midlife crisis is a largely false one. Personality characteristics remain stable throughout this period, and relationships in middle age may continue to evolve into connections that are stable.

== See also ==
- Aging
- Midlife crisis
- Young adult
- Youth
- Middlephobia (in Japanese)

Preceded by Young adulthood	Stages of human development Middle age	Succeeded by Old age
