= San Base =

Canadian artist

San Base (December 1, 1956 in Russia) is a contemporary Canadian artist specializing in generative art.

He graduated from school of Fine Arts in 1974, and received his PhD in Cybernetics from the Technical University in 1979.

== Life and work ==
San Base used to work out complex computer codes in various visual applications when he began to see a possibility of combining his long standing interest in art with sophisticated mathematical approaches, and thus employing new electronic media for his artistic creations.

In 2002 San Base devised his "Dynamic Painting" algorithm, which allowed him to place an art object on a computer screen and make it not static, but changing and transforming with time. Dynamic Painting technology uses powerful video cards to generate real-time images that rival those seen in conventional contemporary painting.

Since 1996 San Base lives and works in Toronto.

== Exhibitions ==
- Gallery Gora Montreal, Canada
- ArtEscapes Valencia, Spain
- Yorkville TPL Toronto, Canada
- Grifon gallery Izhevsk Russia
- GA2007 Milan, Italy
- ARTPOLIGON Omsk Russia

== Sources ==
- San Base And Dynamic Painting
- Lischka, Konrad (2007-09-04). "Kunst aus dem Computer: Malen nach Zahlen" (in German). Spiegel Online.
- "Self-shifting digital paintings". CNET News.com. 2007-08-28. Archived from the original on June 16, 2011.
