= Mark Napier (artist) =

American artist

Mark Napier is an early adopter of the web and a pioneer of digital and Internet art (net.art) in the United States, known for creating interactive online artwork that challenges traditional definitions of art. He uses code as an expressive form, and the Internet as his exhibition space and laboratory. Napier developed his first web-based applications for financial data in 1996. He is the author of his own website, potatoland.org, his online studio where many of his net artworks can be found, such as Shredder 1.0, net.flag, Riot, etc.

== Personal life ==
Mark Napier was born in 1961 in Springfield, New Jersey. Napier lives and works in New York city. Currently, he is a consultant for a new personal finance company.

== Education ==
Mark Napier graduated in 1984 with a bachelor's degree in Fine Arts from Syracuse University.

== Life and work ==
Trained as a painter, Napier worked as a self-taught programmer in New York's financial markets until 1995, when a friend introduced him to the web. With Levi Asher, Napier collaborated on his first website ("Chicken Wire Mother") and began several experiments with hypertext in which he explored juxtaposing meanings and pop culture symbols. In The Distorted Barbie site, Napier created a family of Photoshopped Barbie also-rans that riffed on the "sacred cash-cow" status of the capitalist icon. Mattel was not amused and threatened Napier with a cease-and-desist letter, which prompted a wholesale copying of the site by enraged fans.

In 1997, shortly after the Distorted Barbie episode, Napier opened potatoland.org, an online studio for interactive work where he explored software as an art medium with such pieces as Digital Landfill and Internet shredder 1.0 (1998). Both pieces were included in the seminal "net_condition" show at ZKM in Karlsruhe and attracted critical attention: Shredder was shown at Ars Electronica and Digital Landfill was written up in the Village Voice. Over the next five years Napier explored the networked software environment, creating work that challenged the definition of the art object. The salient features of these pieces: 1) The artwork can be altered by the viewer/visitor, 2) it responds to actions from the viewer/visitor and 3) typically relies on viewer/visitor actions to enact the work. The work can change, possibly unpredictably, over time, and often appropriates other network property to use as raw material, e.g., websites, flags, images. The art is "massively public": it is accessible to and can be altered by anybody with access to the network.

These pieces exist in part as performances, in part as places that a viewer visits, in part as compositions, like music, that unfold differently when played under different circumstances. The overriding experience is that the art object is disembodied, existing in many places at once, with many authors contributing to the piece, with many appearances, over time, with no clear end point. The artwork is in the algorithm, the process, which manifests itself in an unending series of appearances on the screen.

During this time Napier produced Riot, an alternative browser shown in the 2002 Whitney Biennial, Feed, commissioned by SFMOMA and shown in the "010101" show at SFMOMA (2001), and net.flag, commissioned by the Guggenheim Museum. In 2002 net.flag and John Simon's Unfolding Object became the first network-based artworks to be acquired by a major museum.

These pieces turn the structure of the software/network environment inside out, hacking the inner workings of virtual space, and often collide physical metaphors with the insolidity of the net environment, i.e. shredding (Shredder), decaying (Digital Landfill), breaking down neighborhoods (Riot), creating a flag (net.flag). By hacking the http protocol he turns the web into an abstract expressionist painting or a meditative color field. Matt Mirapaul writing in the New York Times described Feed as "a digital action painting, albeit with actual action." Napier has said, he is influenced by Jackson Pollock, he admires how he used the material, the way "he explored paint in its most raw form, without disguising it." In Shredder he wanted to use the web as raw material, so the code, HTML, text, images, and colors, would become a visual aesthetic in their own right. Cy Twombly has also influenced him as well, for the "chaotic, accidental, seemingly unplanned quality of his work."

This repurposing of the matter of the web continues in Black and White (2003), a transitional piece in which Napier reads the text of the Old Testament, New Testament and Koran, as a stream of zeroes and ones, then treats the stream of binary data as two forces that drive a black and white line on the screen. The lines are propelled by the 0 and 1 values from the data, and are mutually attracted to one another, creating a swirling, orbiting dance as the black and white points seek equilibrium. The Black and White algorithm translates writing from a form that is meaningful to human beings into a form that is equally precise, but that can only be understood as a gestalt: a moment of insight that points to experiences that cannot be transcribed into text.

In the period following 2003, Napier explored a more private side of software, making meditative pieces and drawing on the history of painting for inspiration. In three solo shows at bitforms gallery in Manhattan, Napier leaves the browser and moves towards a more tactile interactivity, showing work that is graphically rich and minimally interactive. Still addressing the expression of power in the global network, Napier turns to the Empire State Building as a symbol of nationalism, military and economic might. By transliterating the monument into software, Napier creates a contradiction: a soft, malleable, bouncing skyscraper. Flexible where the original is rigid, small where the original is huge, at once delicate and unbreakable, Napier's skyscraper collides the worlds of steel with the world of software, and reveals the anxiety of transitional time.

Some of Napier's works, including KingKong, Cyclops Birth,and Smoke, have been described as symbolizing the expression of power in the Information Age. His works contrast the permanence of steel, the formative material of the Industrial Revolution, to the dynamic quality of electricity, magnetism and light.

As they comment on the condition of human media in transition, these pieces also upset the conventions of visual art, long dominated by permanent unique objects. By creating virtual "objects" Napier's work exists in a space that is visible, yet forever just out of reach. These objects teeter on the edge of solidity and tempt the viewer to freeze them, hold them, to return them to the familiar and comfortably solid world.

In 2013 Napier created the now defunct android app (Kaarme Scholarship Search) that allowed individuals to search for both college and scholarships. The app gave high-school students a LinkedIn like site where they can network with colleges, counselors and find the resources they need to get into college. This project was the company's first step into mobile apps, a critical technology for the high-school demographic.

A recipient of grants from Creative Capital, NYFA, and the Greenwall Foundation, Napier has also been commissioned to create artwork for SFMOMA, the Whitney Museum, and the Guggenheim. Napier's work has also been exhibited at the Centre Pompidou, MoMA PS1, the Walker Arts Center, Ars Electronica, The Kitchen, Kunstlerhaus Vienna, Transmediale, Bard College, the Princeton University Art Museum, ASCII Digital Festival, bitforms gallery in Seoul, and la Villette in Paris, among many others.

== Notable projects ==
- The Distorted Barbie (1996)
- Digital Landfill (1998)
- Shredder 1.0 (1998)
- Riot (1999)
- ©Bots (2000)
- net.flag (2002)
- Black and White (2003)
- Kaarme Scholarship Search (2013)

== Awards and honors ==
- 2007 New York Foundation for the Arts Fellowship in Computer Arts
- 2002 Creative Capital grant
- 2001 Nominated for a Webby Award in the Arts category
- 2001 New York Foundation for the Arts, fellowship in Computer Arts
- 2001 Greenwall Foundation grant for “Point-to-Point”
- 2000 Fraunhofer Society prize for “Point-to-Point”
- 1999 The Shredder awarded honorable mention by Ars Electronica 99.
- 1998 Digital Landfill receives first prize in ASCII Digital 99 festival
