= Shredder 1.0 =

Work of digital art by Mark Napier

- Artist: Mark Napier
- Medium: Digital art
- Movement: net.art
- Website: https://www.potatoland.org/shredder/

Shredder 1.0 is a work of net.art created by Mark Napier. The Shredder 1.0 interface takes preexisting websites and deconstructs their code to create original abstract compositions.

Napier, a digital artist from New York, released the Shredder 1.0 interface in 1998. Shredder was created to be both an interactive exhibit as well as an artwork generator. To create an image the user inserts a URL into the Shredder 1.0 and the code is then reinterpreted by a Perl script code created by Napier. The result "shreds" the graphical elements on the screen, creating chopped and outsized images, text, and code.

Napier was inspired by an alternative browser called Web Stalker as well as the work of Jackson Pollock. He told The New York Times that Shredder was intended as "a way of waking people up to the possibilities of the medium aesthetically".
