= Giles Whitaker =

Artist who specializes in digital media

- Born: 1973 (age 52–53); England
- Occupation: Digital media artist

Giles Whitaker (born 1973) is a New Zealand artist who specialises in digital media, sound art, and generative and interactive coding-based art.

== Early life and education ==
Whitaker was born in England and emigrated to New Zealand at the age of eight. He holds a Master's degree in chemistry from the University of Auckland, a Bachelor of Fine Arts degree from Massey University, and a Master of Fine Arts degree from the University of Western Ontario.

== Work ==
Whitaker's work has been exhibited in New Zealand and Canadian galleries including:

- Etobicoke Civic Centre Art Gallery, Toronto
- Toi Pōneke Gallery, Wellington
- Enjoy Gallery, Wellington
- Museum London, Ontario
- Hamilton Artists Inc.
- Workers Arts & Heritage Centre, Ontario
- McIntosh Gallery, Ontario
- DNA Artspace, Ontario
- The Dust Palace, Auckland

His films have been shown at:

- The Film Archive, Wellington
- The Physics Room, Christchurch
- Govett-Brewster Art Gallery, New Plymouth

Whitaker's 2016 Infinity Machine work was analysed in an essay by Taien Ng-Chan published by Soyfish Media. Eighteen of Whitaker's abstract video works are part of the permanent collection of Ngā Taonga Sound and Vision (formerly the New Zealand Film Archive), including Four New Works (2008), Selected Abstract Video Works from 2006 to 2007, and Ringscape (2007)
