= Generative art =

Art created by a set of rules, often using computers

Condensation Cube, plexiglass and water, by Hans Haacke; Hirshhorn Museum and Sculpture Garden, begun 1965, completed 2008

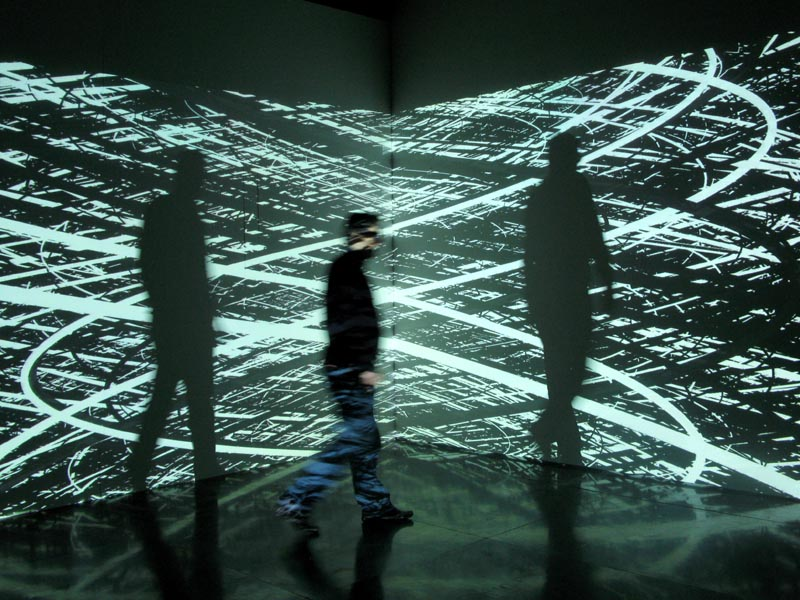
Installation view of Irrational Geometrics 2008 by Pascal Dombis

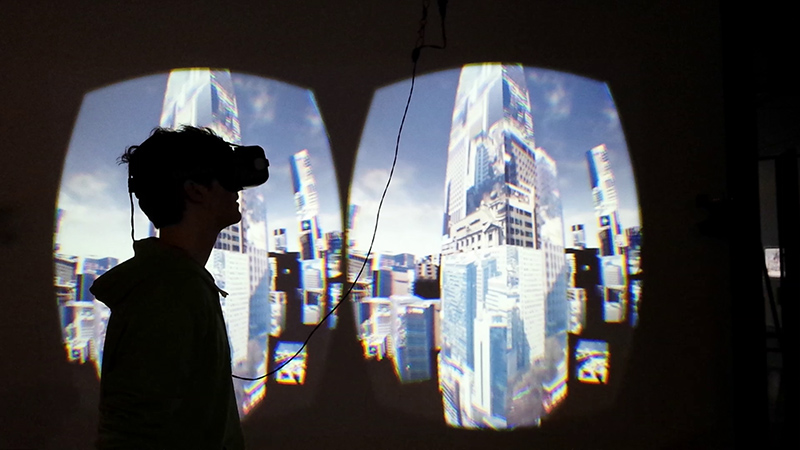
Telepresence-based installation 10.000 Moving Cities, 2016 by Marc Lee

Generative art is post-conceptual art that has been created (in whole or in part) with the use of an autonomous system. An autonomous system in this context is generally one that is non-human and can independently determine features of an artwork that would otherwise require decisions made directly by the artist. In some cases the human creator may claim that the generative system represents their own artistic idea, and in others that the system takes on the role of the creator.

"Generative art" often refers to algorithmic art (algorithmically determined computer generated artwork) and synthetic media (general term for any algorithmically generated media), but artists can also make generative art using systems of chemistry, biology, mechanics and robotics, smart materials, manual randomization, mathematics, data mapping, symmetry, and tiling.

Generative algorithms, algorithms programmed to produce artistic works through predefined rules, stochastic methods, or procedural logic, often yielding dynamic, unique, and contextually adaptable outputs—are central to many of these practices.

== History ==
The use of the word "generative" in the discussion of art has developed over time. The use of "Artificial DNA" defines a generative approach to art focused on the construction of a system able to generate unpredictable events, all with a recognizable common character. The use of autonomous systems, required by some contemporary definitions, focuses a generative approach where the controls are strongly reduced. This approach is also named "emergent". Margaret Boden and Ernest Edmonds have noted the use of the term "generative art" in the broad context of automated computer graphics in the 1960s, beginning with artwork exhibited by Georg Nees and Frieder Nake in 1965: A. Michael Noll did his initial computer art, combining randomness with order, in 1962, and exhibited it along with works by Bell Julesz in 1965.

The terms "generative art" and "computer art" have been used in tandem, and more or less interchangeably, since the very earliest days.

The first such exhibition showed the work of Nees in February 1965, which some claim was titled "Generative Computergrafik". While Nees does not himself remember, this was the title of his doctoral thesis published a few years later. The correct title of the first exhibition and catalog was "computer-grafik". "Generative art" and related terms was in common use by several other early computer artists around this time, including Manfred Mohr and Ken Knowlton. Vera Molnár (born 1924) is a French media artist of Hungarian origin. Molnar is widely considered to be a pioneer of generative art, and is also one of the first women to use computers in her art practice.

The term "Generative Art" with the meaning of dynamic artwork-systems able to generate multiple artwork-events was clearly used the first time for the "Generative Art" conference in Milan in 1998. The term has also been used to describe geometric abstract art where simple elements are repeated, transformed, or varied to generate more complex forms. Thus defined, generative art was practiced by the Argentinian artists Eduardo Mac Entyre and Miguel Ángel Vidal in the late 1960s. In 1972 the Romanian-born Paul Neagu created the Generative Art Group in Britain. It was populated exclusively by Neagu using aliases such as "Hunsy Belmood" and "Edward Larsocchi". In 1972 Neagu gave a lecture titled 'Generative Art Forms' at the Queen's University, Belfast Festival.

In 1970 the School of the Art Institute of Chicago created a department called Generative Systems. As described by Sonia Landy Sheridan the focus was on art practices using the then new technologies for the capture, inter-machine transfer, printing and transmission of images, as well as the exploration of the aspect of time in the transformation of image information. Also noteworthy is John Dunn, first a student and then a collaborator of Sheridan.

In 1988 Clauser identified the aspect of systemic autonomy as a critical element in generative art:

It should be evident from the above description of the evolution of generative art that process (or structuring) and change (or transformation) are among its most definitive features, and that these features and the very term 'generative' imply dynamic development and motion. (the result) is not a creation by the artist but rather the product of the generative process - a self-precipitating structure.

In 1989 Celestino Soddu defined the Generative Design approach to Architecture and Town Design in his book Citta' Aleatorie.

In 1989 Franke referred to "generative mathematics" as "the study of mathematical operations suitable for generating artistic images."

From the mid-1990s Brian Eno popularized the terms generative music and generative systems, making a connection with earlier experimental music by Terry Riley, Steve Reich and Philip Glass.

From the end of the 20th century, communities of generative artists, designers, musicians and theoreticians began to meet, forming cross-disciplinary perspectives. The first meeting about generative Art was in 1998, at the inaugural International Generative Art conference at Politecnico di Milano University, Italy. In Australia, the Iterate conference on generative systems in the electronic arts followed in 1999. On-line discussion has centered around the eu-gene mailing list, which began late 1999, and has hosted much of the debate which has defined the field. These activities have more recently been joined by the Generator.x conference in Berlin starting in 2005. In 2012 the new journal GASATHJ, Generative Art Science and Technology Hard Journal was founded by Celestino Soddu and Enrica Colabella jointing several generative artists and scientists in the editorial board.

Some have argued that as a result of this engagement across disciplinary boundaries, the community has converged on a shared meaning of the term. As Boden and Edmonds put it in 2011:

Today, the term "Generative Art" is still current within the relevant artistic community. Since 1998 a series of conferences have been held in Milan with that title (Generativeart.com), and Brian Eno has been influential in promoting and using generative art methods (Eno, 1996). Both in music and in visual art, the use of the term has now converged on work that has been produced by the activation of a set of rules and where the artist lets a computer system take over at least some of the decision-making (although, of course, the artist determines the rules).

In the call of the Generative Art conferences in Milan (annually starting from 1998), the definition of Generative Art by Celestino Soddu:

Generative Art is the idea realized as genetic code of artificial events, as construction of dynamic complex systems able to generate endless variations. Each Generative Project is a concept-software that works producing unique and non-repeatable events, like music or 3D Objects, as possible and manifold expressions of the generating idea strongly recognizable as a vision belonging to an artist / designer / musician / architect /mathematician.

Discussion on the eu-gene mailing list was framed by the following definition by Adrian Ward from 1999:

Generative art is a term given to work which stems from concentrating on the processes involved in producing an artwork, usually (although not strictly) automated by the use of a machine or computer, or by using mathematic or pragmatic instructions to define the rules by which such artworks are executed.

A similar definition is provided by Philip Galanter:

Generative art refers to any art practice where the artist creates a process, such as a set of natural language rules, a computer program, a machine, or other procedural invention, which is then set into motion with some degree of autonomy contributing to or resulting in a completed work of art.

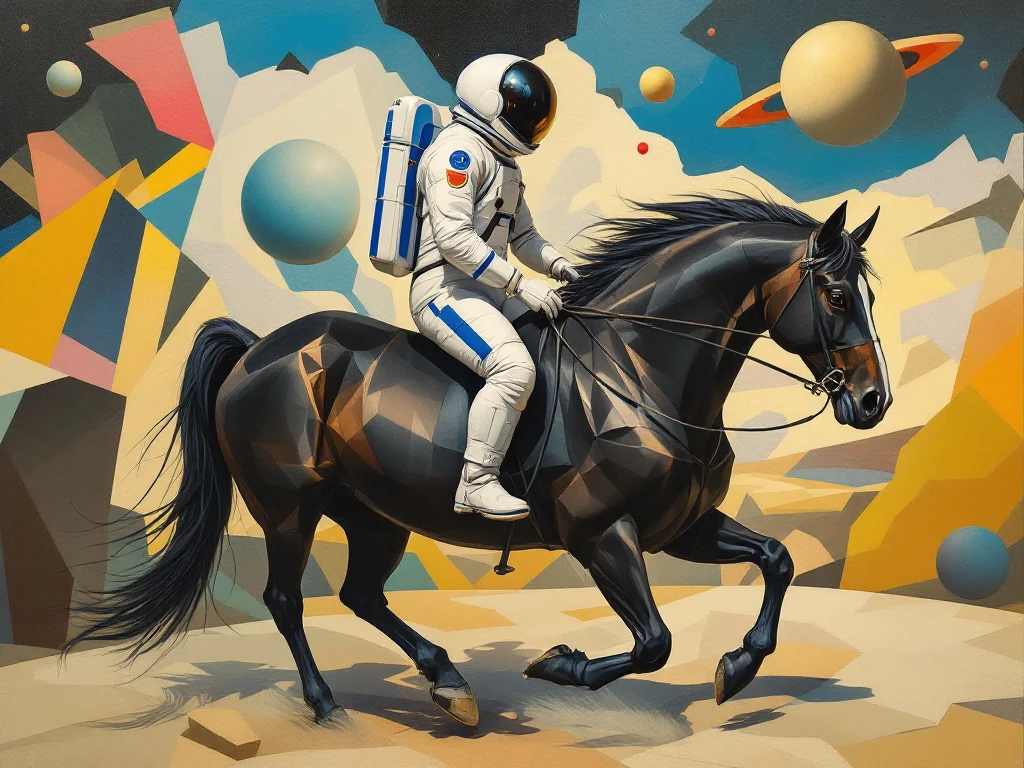
An image generated by Flux using the prompt an astronaut riding a horse, by Picasso and Juan Gris. Generative image models are adept at imitating the visual style of particular artists in their training set, prompting a backlash from some artists who object to having imitations of their style generated on a massive scale without their permission.

Around the 2020s, generative AI models learned to imitate the distinct style of particular authors. For example, a generative image model such as Stable Diffusion is able to model the stylistic characteristics of an artist like Pablo Picasso (including his particular brush strokes, use of colour, perspective, and so on), and a user can engineer a prompt such as "an astronaut riding a horse, by Picasso" to cause the model to generate a novel image applying the artist's style to an arbitrary subject. Generative image models have received significant backlash from artists who object to their style being imitated without their permission, arguing that this harms their ability to profit from their own work.

The emergence of text-to-image generative AI systems has expanded debates over authorship, copyright, and artistic labor. The main issues in these debates include the eligibility of AI-generated outputs for copyright protection and the legal and ethical questions of using existing copyrighted works as training data for generative AI systems.

== Types ==
=== Music ===
Johann Kirnberger's Musikalisches Würfelspiel ("Musical Dice Game") of 1757 is considered an early example of a generative system based on randomness. Dice were used to select musical sequences from a numbered pool of previously composed phrases. This system provided a balance of order and disorder. The structure was based on an element of order on one hand, and disorder on the other.

The fugues of J.S. Bach could be considered generative, in that there is a strict underlying process that is followed by the composer. Similarly, serialism follows strict procedures which, in some cases, can be set up to generate entire compositions with limited human intervention.

Composers such as John Cage, Farmers Manual, and Brian Eno have used generative systems in their works.

=== Visual art ===
The artist Ellsworth Kelly created paintings by using chance operations to assign colors in a grid. He also created works on paper that he then cut into strips or squares and reassembled using chance operations to determine placement.

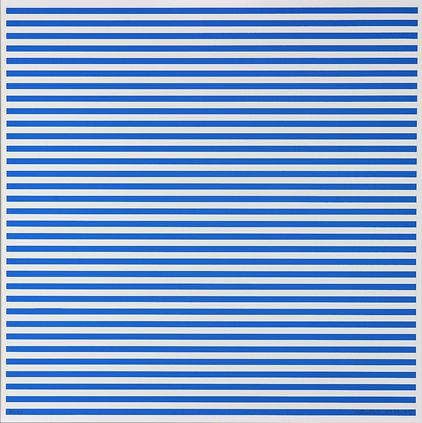
Album de 10 sérigraphies sur 10 ans, by François Morellet, 2009

Artists such as Hans Haacke have explored processes of physical and social systems in artistic context. François Morellet has used both highly ordered and highly disordered systems in his artwork. Some of his paintings feature regular systems of radial or parallel lines to create Moiré patterns. In other works he has used chance operations to determine the coloration of grids. Sol LeWitt created generative art in the form of systems expressed in natural language and systems of geometric permutation. Harold Cohen's AARON system is a longstanding project combining software artificial intelligence with robotic painting devices to create physical artifacts. Steina and Woody Vasulka are video art pioneers who used analog video feedback to create generative art. Video feedback is now cited as an example of deterministic chaos, and the early explorations by the Vasulkas anticipated contemporary science by many years. Software systems exploiting evolutionary computing to create visual form include those created by Scott Draves and Karl Sims. The digital artist Joseph Nechvatal has exploited models of viral contagion. Autopoiesis by Ken Rinaldo includes fifteen musical and robotic sculptures that interact with the public and modify their behaviors based on both the presence of the participants and each other. Jean-Pierre Hebert and Roman Verostko are founding members of the Algorists, a group of artists who create their own algorithms to create art. A. Michael Noll, of Bell Telephone Laboratories, Inc., programmed computer art using mathematical equations and programmed randomness, starting in 1962.

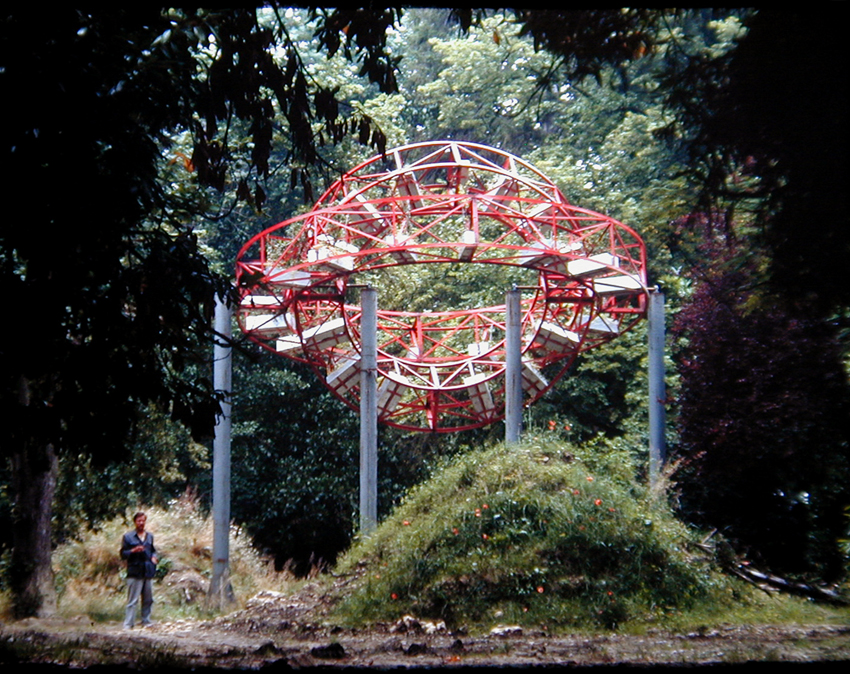
Iapetus, by Jean-Max Albert, 1985

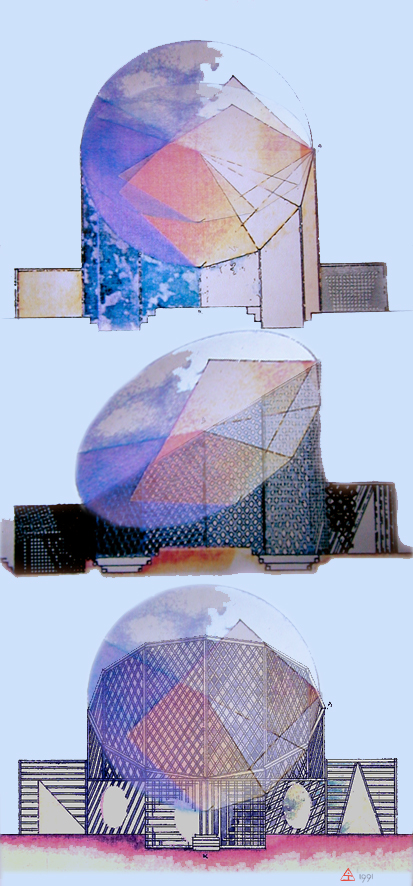
Calmoduline Monument, by Jean-Max Albert, 1991

The French artist Jean-Max Albert, beside environmental sculptures like Iapetus, and O=C=O, developed a project dedicated to the vegetation itself, in terms of biological activity. The Calmoduline Monument project is based on the property of a protein, calmodulin, to bond selectively to calcium. Exterior physical constraints (wind, rain, etc.) modify the electric potential of the cellular membranes of a plant and consequently the flux of calcium. However, the calcium controls the expression of the calmoduline gene. The plant can thus, when there is a stimulus, modify its "typical" growth pattern. So the basic principle of this monumental sculpture is that to the extent that they could be picked up and transported, these signals could be enlarged, translated into colors and shapes, and show the plant's "decisions", suggesting a level of fundamental biological activity.

Maurizio Bolognini works with generative machines to address conceptual and social concerns. Mark Napier is a pioneer in data mapping, creating works based on the streams of zeros and ones in Ethernet traffic, as part of the "Carnivore" project. Martin Wattenberg pushed this theme further, transforming "data sets" as diverse as musical scores (in "Shape of Song", 2001) and Wikipedia edits (History Flow, 2003, with Fernanda Viegas) into dramatic visual compositions. The Canadian artist San Base developed a "Dynamic Painting" algorithm in 2002. Using computer algorithms as "brush strokes", Base creates sophisticated imagery that evolves over time to produce a fluid, never-repeating artwork.

Since 1996 there have been ambigram generators that auto generate ambigrams.

Italian composer Pietro Grossi, pioneer of computer music since 1986, has extended his experiments to images – using the same procedure as in his musical work –, to be more precise, to computer graphics, writing programs with specific auto-decisions, and developing the concept of HomeArt, presented for the first time in the exhibition New Atlantis: the continent of electronic music organized by the Venice Biennale in 1986.

Some contemporary artists who create generative visual artworks are John Maeda, Daniel Shiffman, Zachary Lieberman, Golan Levin, Casey Reas, Ben Fry, and Giles Whitaker (artist).

=== Comics ===
In comics, Ilan Manouach's Fastwalkers (2023), published by La Cinquième Couche, is considered the first book-length comic in which all text and images were produced through machine learning (GAN and GPT-3), developed within the Nvidia Inception Accelerator program.

=== Software art ===
For some artists, graphic user interfaces and computer code have become an independent art form in themselves. Adrian Ward created Auto-Illustrator as a commentary on software and generative methods applied to art and design.

=== Architecture ===
In 1987 Celestino Soddu created the artificial DNA of Italian Medieval towns able to generate endless 3D models of cities identifiable as belonging to the idea.

In 2010, Michael Hansmeyer generated architectural columns in a project called "Subdivided Columns – A New Order (2010)". The piece explored how the simple process of repeated subdivision can create elaborate architectural patterns. Rather than designing any columns directly, Hansmeyer designed a process that produced columns automatically. The process could be run again and again with different parameters to create endless permutations. Endless permutations could be considered a hallmark of generative design.

=== Literature ===
Writers such as Tristan Tzara, Brion Gysin, and William Burroughs used the cut-up technique to introduce randomization to literature as a generative system. Jackson Mac Low produced computer-assisted poetry and used algorithms to generate texts; Philip M. Parker has written software to automatically generate entire books. Jason Nelson used generative methods with speech-to-text software to create a series of digital poems from movies, television and other audio sources.

In the late 2010s, authors began to experiment with neural networks trained on large language datasets. David Jhave Johnston's ReRites is an early example of human-edited AI-generated poetry.

=== Live coding ===
Generative systems may be modified while they operate, for example by using interactive programming environments such as Csound, SuperCollider, Fluxus and TidalCycles, including patching environments such as Max/MSP, Pure Data and vvvv. This is a standard approach to programming by artists, but may also be used to create live music and/or video by manipulating generative systems on stage, a performance practice that has become known as live coding. As with many examples of software art, because live coding emphasizes human authorship rather than autonomy, it may be considered in opposition to generative art.

=== Blockchain ===
Chromie Squiggle #7515, from the first generative art collection of Art Blocks

In 2020, Erick "Snowfro" Calderon launched the Art Blocks platform for combining the ideas of generative art and the blockchain, with resulting artworks created as NFTs on the Ethereum blockchain. One of the key innovations with the generative art created in this way is that all the source code and algorithm for creating the art has to be finalized and put on the blockchain permanently, without any ability to alter it further. Only when the artwork is sold ("minted"), the artwork is generated; the result is random yet should reflect the overall aesthetic defined by the artist. Calderon argues that this process forces the artist to be very thoughtful of the algorithm behind the art:

Until today, a [generative] artist would create an algorithm, press the spacebar 100 times, pick five of the best ones and print them in high quality. Then they would frame them, and put them in a gallery. Maybe. Because Art Blocks forces the artist to accept every single output of the algorithm as their signed piece, the artist has to go back and tweak the algorithm until it's perfect. They can't just cherry pick the good outputs. That elevates the level of algorithmic execution because the artist is creating something that they know they're proud of before they even know what's going to come out on the other side.

== Theories ==
=== Philip Galanter ===
In 2003, Philip Galanter published the most widely cited theory of generative art which describes generative art systems in the context of complexity theory. In particular the notion of Murray Gell-Mann and Seth Lloyd's effective complexity is cited. In this view both highly ordered and highly disordered generative art can be viewed as simple. Highly ordered generative art minimizes entropy and allows maximal data compression, and highly disordered generative art maximizes entropy and disallows significant data compression. Maximally complex generative art blends order and disorder in a manner similar to biological life, and indeed biologically inspired methods are most frequently used to create complex generative art. This view is at odds with the earlier information theory influenced views of Max Bense and Abraham Moles where complexity in art increases with disorder.

Galanter notes further that given the use of visual symmetry, pattern, and repetition by the most ancient known cultures generative art is as old as art itself. He also addresses the mistaken equivalence by some that rule-based art is synonymous with generative art. For example, some art is based on constraint rules that disallow the use of certain colors or shapes. Such art is not generative because constraint rules are not constructive, i.e. by themselves they do not assert what is to be done, only what cannot be done.

=== Margaret Boden and Ernest Edmonds ===
In their 2009 article, Margaret Boden and Ernest Edmonds agree that generative art need not be restricted to that done using computers, and that some rule-based art is not generative. They develop a technical vocabulary that includes Ele-art (electronic art), C-art (computer art), D-art (digital art), CA-art (computer assisted art), G-art (generative art), CG-art (computer based generative art), Evo-art (evolutionary based art), R-art (robotic art), I-art (interactive art), CI-art (computer based interactive art), and VR-art (virtual reality art).

=== Questions ===
The discourse around generative art can be characterized by the theoretical questions which motivate its development. McCormack et al. propose the following questions, shown with paraphrased summaries, as the most important:

1. Can a machine originate anything? Related to machine intelligence - can a machine generate something new, meaningful, surprising and of value: a poem, an artwork, a useful idea, a solution to a long-standing problem?
2. What is it like to be a computer that makes art? If a computer could originate art, what would it be like from the computer's perspective?
3. Can human aesthetics be formalized?
4. What new kinds of art does the computer enable? Many generative artworks do not involve digital computers, but what does generative computer art bring that is new?
5. In what sense is generative art representational, and what is it representing?
6. What is the role of randomness in generative art? For example, what does the use of randomness say about the place of intentionality in the making of art?
7. What can computational generative art tell us about creativity? How could generative art give rise to artifacts and ideas that are new, surprising and valuable?
8. What characterizes good generative art? How can we form a more critical understanding of generative art?
9. What can we learn about art from generative art? For example, can the art world be considered a complex generative system involving many processes outside the direct control of artists, who are agents of production within a stratified global art market?
10. What future developments would force us to rethink our answers?

Another question is of postmodernism—are generative art systems the ultimate expression of the postmodern condition, or do they point to a new synthesis based on a complexity-inspired world-view?

== See also ==
- Artificial intelligence art
- Artmedia
- Conway's Game of Life
- Digital morphogenesis
- Evolutionary art
- Generative AI
- New media art
- Non-fungible token (NFT)
- Post-conceptualism
- Process music
- Systems art
- Virtual art
- Generative design
