= Celestino Soddu =

Italian academic in architecture

- Born: 2 April 1945 (age 79); Como, Italy
- Occupation(s): Academic, writer, architect
- Known for: Generative design

Academic background
- Education: Sapienza University of Rome

Academic work
- Discipline: Architecture
- Website: www.soddu.it

Celestino Soddu (2 April 1945, Como, Italy) is an Italian architect and academic. He teaches generative design at Polytechnic University of Milan and is a pioneer of generative art and design. In 2005, he described generative design as a "design philosophy."

== Biography ==
Soddu was born on 2 April 1945 in Como, Italy in a Serramannesi family in Sardinia. He attended primary school in Cagliari and secondary school at Leo XIII Institute in Milan before graduating with a Master's degree in architecture from Sapienza University of Rome in 1970. He received his architectural license the same year.

Soddu has been a professor since 1971 and has taught at the Polytechnic University of Milan, Shanghai University, Xi'an University of Architecture and Technology, and University of Cagliari. He is among the pioneers of generative design and established the discipline. Soddu created the first draft of his generative software Argenia in the late 1980s while working in Somalia. His first project was to create 3D models of medieval Italian towns. In 1992, he was the director of the Generative Design Laboratory, which he founded with his colleague Enrica Colabella, at the Polytechnic University of Milan. In 1998, they coined the term generative art.

In addition to his scholarship, Soddu began organizing and directing the International Generative Art Conference in 1998. In 2002, he worked with the European Commission's Asia program to establish an international network of generative design labs in Milan, Eindhoven, Kassel, Shanghai, and Tianjin. He coordinated the program until 2005. In 2011, he and Colabella established the Generative Art Science and Technology Hard Journal and in 2013 were restoring a house in Serramanna to serve as the International Center on Identities and Generative Art, or Domus Argenia. In 2020 and 2021, he worked on a reconstruction proposal for Notre Dame after its spire was destroyed in a 2019 fire using generative design. Soddu has presented his research internationally, including at the Hong Kong Museum of Art in Hong Kong, the Pacific Design Center in Los Angeles, the Italian Embassy in Beijing, and the Palazzo dei Giureconsulti in Milan, and has written books in both Italian and English. He is considered an expert of Somalian Foreign Affairs and Italian Public Works.

== Personal life ==
In his spare time, Soddu plays jazz music. As of 2013, he lives in Serramanna.

== Selected works ==
=== Books ===
- L'artificiale progettato (1979)
- The Contemporary Art in the School (1988)
- Citta' aleatorie (1989)
- Simulation Tools for the Dynamic Evolution in Town Shape (1991)
- Il progetto ambientale di morfogenesi (1992)
- L'immagine non euclidea (1997)
- Milano, variazioni visionarie (2005)
- All published books can be downloaded for free at https://artscience-ebookshop.com

=== Articles ===
- "La patina del tempo" (1984), Recuperare.
- "L'idea di spazio nelle rappresentazioni d'arte" (1988), Critica d'arte.
- "Rappresentazione e rilievo per immagini tridimensionali computerizzate della morfogenesi storica urbana" (1991), XYZ.
- "变化多端的建筑生成设计法" (2004), Architect.
- "Visionary Variations in Generative Architectural Design" (2005), Chepos Magazine.
- "Generative Design" (2012), Generative Art Science and Technology Hard Journal
- https://soddu.it
- https://generativedesign.com
- https://generativeart.com
- https://gasathj.com
- http://futuringpast.com .
