= Roger Allen (musicologist) =

Musicologist

Roger Allen (born 1951) is Emeritus Fellow of St Peter's College, Oxford. A musicologist, he is also Tutor in Music and Official Fellow at St Peter's and Lecturer in Music at St Edmund Hall at the University of Oxford.
