= John Daverio =

American musicologist (1954–2003)

John Joseph Daverio (October 19, 1954 – March 16, 2003) was a violinist, scholar, teacher and author, best known for his writings on the music of Robert Schumann and Johannes Brahms. His research interests centered around Austro-German composers including J. S. Bach, Mozart, Schubert, Wagner and Post-Romantic composers such as R. Strauss and Mahler. Just before his sudden death, he was exploring the concept of "late Style" in the music of Haydn, Mozart, and Beethoven. All of his writings feature the relation of music to literature and philosophy.

Daverio was born in Sharon, Pennsylvania, the only son of Italian-American parents. He was a professor of music at Boston University and chairman of the CFA school of music musicology department and of the CAS and GRS department of music and ad interim director of the school of music; Daverio received the University's Metcalf Award for Excellence in Teaching.

Daverio died under mysterious circumstances, drowning in the Charles River at the age of 48. It remains unclear whether his death was accident or suicide, though foul play has been ruled out. Some have noted an unfortunate irony in the manner of Daverio's death, as Robert Schumann attempted suicide in 1854 by throwing himself into the Rhine river, and Daverio was among the world's leading Schumann scholars.

== Selected works ==
- Crossing paths : Schubert, Schumann, and Brahms. Oxford University Press, 2002. ISBN 0195132963
- Robert Schumann : Herald of a 'New Poetic Age.' Oxford University Press, 1997. ISBN 0195091809
- Nineteenth-Century Music and the German Romantic Ideology. Schirmer Books, 1993. ISBN 0028706757
- "The Song Cycle : Journeys through a Romantic Landscape." in German Lieder in the Nineteenth Century. ed. by Rufus Hallmark. Routledge, 2010. ISBN 9780415990370
- "Songs of dawn and dusk : coming to terms with the late music." in The Cambridge Companion to Schumann. ed. by Beate Perrey. Cambridge University Press, 2007. ISBN 9780521783415
- "Piano works I : a world of Images." in The Cambridge Companion to Schumann. ed. by Beate Perrey. Cambridge University Press, 2007. ISBN 9780521783415
- "Point-counter-point: Schoenberg meets Bach," in Liber Amicorum Isabelle Cazeaux: Symbols, Parallels and Discoveries in Her Honor (Festschrift Series.) ed. by Paul-André Bempéchat. Pendragon Press, 2005. ISBN 1576470911
- "Mozart in the Nineteenth Century," The Cambridge Companion to Mozart. ed. by Simon P. Keefe. Cambridge University Press, 2003. ISBN 0521001927
- "Beautiful and abstruse conversations" : the Chamber Music of Schumann.” in Nineteenth-Century Chamber Music. ed. by Stephen Hefling. Taylor & Francis, 2003. ISBN 0203493087
- "Fin de siecle Chamber Music and the Critique of Modernism." in Nineteenth-Century Chamber Music. ed. by Stephen Hefling. Taylor & Francis, 2003. ISBN 0203493087
- "Robert Schumann," The New Grove Dictionary of Music and Musicians. ed. by Stanley Sadie (2nd ed.), 2004. ISBN 0195170679
- "Manner, Tone, and Tendency in Beethoven’s Chamber Music for Strings." in The Cambridge Companion to Beethoven. ed. by Glenn Stanley. pp. 147–164. Cambridge University Press, 2000. ISBN 0521589347
- "E. T. A. Hoffmann's Allegory of Romantic Opera", in The Varieties of Musicology: Essays in Honor of Murray Lefkowitz, ed. by John Daverio and John K. Ogasapian. Harmonie Park Press, 2000.
- "One More Beautiful Memory of Schubert: Schumann's Critique of the Impromptus, D. 935." The Musical Quarterly, Winter 2000, Vol. 84 no. 4, p. 604.
- "The Legacy of Greek Antiquity as a Stimulus for the Musical Avant-Garde" in International Meeting on Music : Music and Ancient Greece. Symposium Proceedings. Athens : Livanis and European Cultural Centre of Delphi, 1999.
- "Schumann's Ossianic manner." 19th-Century Music, Spring 1998, Vol. 21 no. 3, pp. 247–273.
- "Madness or Prophecy? : Schumann's Gesänge der Frühe, op. 133." pp. 187–204. in Nineteenth-Century Piano Music : Essays in Performance and Analysis. ed. by David Witten. New York : Garland Publishing, 1997. ISBN 0815315023
- "The Song Cycle : Journeys through a Romantic Landscape," in Rufus Hallmark, ed., German Lieder in the Nineteenth Century. New York : Schirmer Books, 1996; pp. 279–312.
- "Schumann's 'New Genre for the Concert Hall', Das Paradies und die Peri, in the Eyes of a Contemporary," in R. Larry Todd, ed. Schumann and His World. Princeton, 1994; pp. 129–56.
- "From 'Concertante Rondo' to 'Lyric Sonata' : A Commentary on Brahms's Reception of Mozart," Brahms Studies. ed. by David Brodbeck. University of Nebraska, 1994. ISBN 0803212437
- "The 'Wechsel der Tone' in Brahms's 'Schicksalslied.'" Journal of the American Musicological Society, Spring 1993, Vol. 46 no. 1, pp. 84–113.
- "Brünnhilde's immolation scene and Wagner's 'conquest of the reprise'" Journal of Musicological Research, January 1991, Vol. 11 no. 1-2, pp. 33–66.
- "Reading Schumann by Way of Jean Paul and His Contemporaries." College Music Symposium, Fall, 1990, Vol. 30, No. 2, pp. 28–45.
- "Brahms's 'Magelone Romanzen' and the 'Romantic imperative.'" The Journal of Musicology, Summer 1989, Vol. 7 no. 3, pp. 343–365.
- "Symmetry and chaos: Friedrich Schlegel's views on music." Nineteenth-Century Contexts, March 1987, Vol. 11 no. 1, pp. 51–62.
- "In Search of the Sonata da Camera before Corelli." Acta Musicologica, July 1985, Vol. 57 no. 2, pp. 195–214.
- "Schumann's 'Im Legendenton' and Friedrich Schlegel's 'Arabeske'" 19th-Century Music, October 1987, Vol. 11 no. 2, pp. 150–163.
- "'Total Work of Art' or 'Nameless Deeds of Music' : Some Thoughts on German Romantic Opera." The Opera Quarterly, Winter 1986, Vol. 4 no. 4, p. 61.
- "Formal Design and Terminology in the Pre-Corellian 'Sonata' and related Instrumental Forms in the Printed Sources." Ph. D. dissertation, Boston University, 1983.
