= UK Museum of Ordure =

The UK Museum of Ordure (UKMO) was an online arts project initiated with the intention to explore the curatorial value of ordure, or human waste. It consisted of a website which initially collected public submissions of ordure, as well as documenting various installations undertaken by the museum. It has since been renamed Museum of Ordure in recognition that its remit is international in scope.

Founded by Stuart Brisley, Geoff Cox and Adrian Ward in 2001, it now consists of the members Rosse Yael Sirb as acting director, as well as Maya Balgioglu, Stuart Brisely, Geoff Cox, and Les Liens Invisibles.

It currently defines itself as follows:

The Museum of Ordure explores the cultural value of ordure through its projects and ongoing public collections.

— www.ordure.org

== See also ==
- Stuart Brisley
