= Nick Collins (composer) =

British academic and computer music composer

- Born: 1975 (age 50–51)
- Occupation: musician

Nick Collins (born 1975) is a British academic and computer music composer. From 2006–2013 he lived in Brighton, UK, and ran the music informatics degrees at the University of Sussex. In 2013 he became Reader at the University of Durham.

He is an experienced pianist and laptopist, and active in both instrumental and electronic music composition. He has toured extensively with the audiovisual duo 'klipp av' and as a solo musician.

Alex McLean of Slub and Nick Collins are the inventors of the Algorave.

== Books ==
- Collins, Nick (2009). Introduction to Computer Music. Chichester: Wiley ISBN 978-0-470-71455-3
- Collins, Nick and d'Escrivan, Julio (eds.) (2007). The Cambridge Companion to Electronic Music. Cambridge: Cambridge University Press. ISBN 978-0-521-68865-9
- Collins, Nick; Schedel. Margaret and Wilson, Scott (2013). Electronic Music. Cambridge: Cambridge University Press. ISBN 9781107648173
