= Generativity =

Term originating in psychology to describe a concern for the next generation

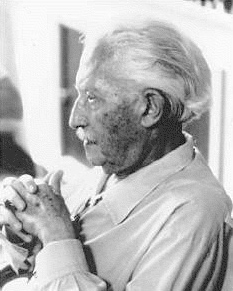
Erik Erikson (1902–1994) was the first to use the term generativity.

The term generativity was coined by the psychoanalyst Erik Erikson in 1950 to denote "a concern for establishing and guiding the next generation." He first used the term while defining the Care stage in his theory of the stages of psychosocial development.

== History ==
In 1950 Erik Erikson created the term generativity to explain the 7th stage in his theory of the stages of psychosocial development. The 7th stage encompasses the middle ages of one's life, from 45 through 64. Generativity was defined as the “ability to transcend personal interests to provide care and concern for younger and older generations.” It took over 30 years for generativity to become a subject of empirical research. Modern psychoanalysts, starting in the early 1990s, have included a concern for one's legacy, referred to as an “inner desire for immortality”, in the definition of generativity.

== Use in psychology ==
Psychologically, generativity is concern for the future, a need to nurture and guide younger people and contribute to the next generation. Erikson argued that this usually develops during middle age (which spans approximately ages 45 through 64) in keeping with his stage-model of psychosocial development. After having experienced old age himself, Erikson believed that generativity maintains a more important role in later life than he initially had thought.

In Erikson's theory, Generativity is contrasted with Stagnation. During this stage, people contribute to the next generation through caring, teaching and engaging in creative work which contributes to society. Generativity involves answering the question "Can I Make My Life Count?", and in this process, finding one’s life's work and contributing to the development of others through activities such as volunteering, mentoring, and contributing to future generations. It has also been described as a concern for one's legacy, accepting the independence lives of family and increasing philanthropic pursuits. Generative concern leads to concrete goals and actions such as "providing a narrative schematic of the generative self to the next generation".

McAdams and de St. Aubin developed a 20-item scale to assess generativity, and to help discover who it is that is nurturing and leading the next generation. This model is not restricted to stages, with generativity able to be a concern throughout adulthood, not just in middle adulthood, as Erikson suggested. Example items include "I try to pass along the knowledge that I have gained through my experiences", "I have a responsibility to improve the neighborhood in which I live", and (reversed) "In general, my actions do not have a positive effect on other people."
