= Peter Manning (musicologist) =

British musicologist

Peter David Manning (1948 – 2022) was a British musicologist and composer known for his research on electronic and computer music.

== Early life and education ==
Born in 1948 in Hampstead, London, he was educated at University College School before reading music at Durham University on a choral scholarship. He graduated with a first-class degree in 1970.

== Career and research ==
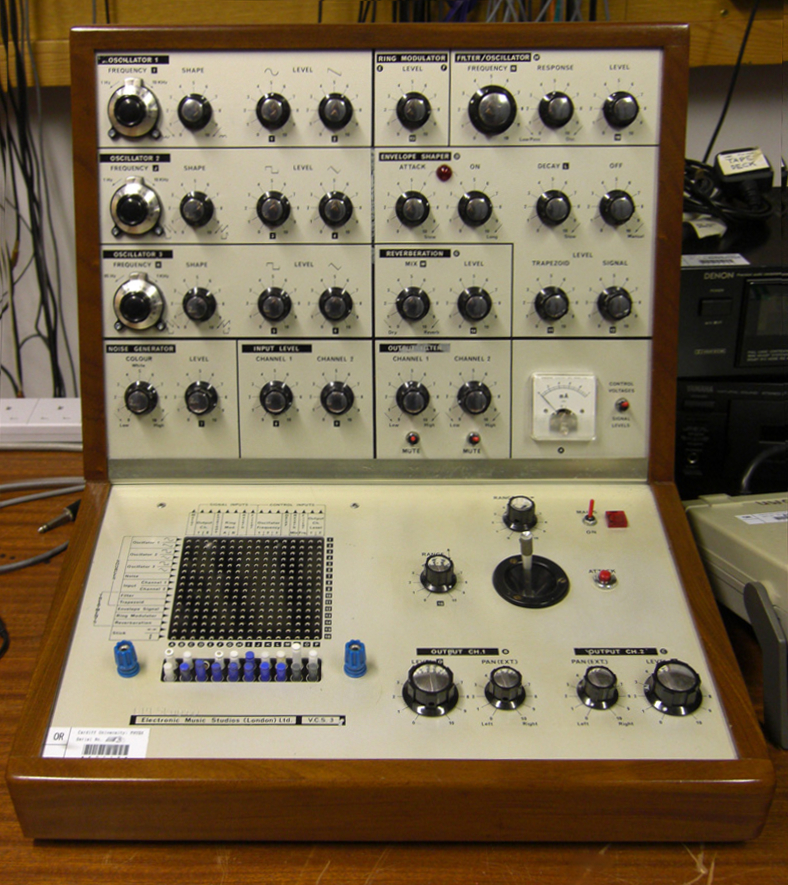
EMS VCS 3

Manning remained at Durham to complete his PhD on electro-acoustic music under the supervision of Australian composer David Lumsdaine — his doctoral studies coinciding with the music department starting to explore new music technology. As a "senior experimental officer" from 1973 he was tasked with researching and creating new sounds on the synthesiser; initially he could only access a single EMS VCS 3, though his "basement room" workspace would eventually become one of the first electronic studios in the country.

During this time he also became a key figure in the development of MUSICON, an annual concert series for contemporary compositions in Durham that attracted a number of leading composers including Steve Reich and Arvo Pärt. He worked closely with many composers in the studio and assisted Lumsdaine on Big Meeting (1978), a quadraphonic work based on field recordings made in 1971 during the annual Durham Miners' Gala. He collaborated with John Casken on the composition Piper's Linn (1984), which combined live performance on the Northumbrian small pipes with analogue techniques to transform recordings of the pipes into "rich and varied" textures.

In 1994 Manning visited Simon Fraser University in Canada where he spent time working in the research studio, mainly with the PODX sound system developed by Barry Truax. By-Law 2531, City of Vancouver, is based on a recording of members of the public reading aloud the "antiquated" noise by-laws of Vancouver, subsequently modified to create ambient sound textures. A second work composed during that visit, The Ghost of Eriboll, is a much longer soundscape that attempts to recreate the "misty" atmosphere of the Scottish Highlands. In 1996 he was made Dean of Arts and Professor of Music at Durham. He retired in 2015.

=== Electronic and Computer Music ===
Manning "established an international reputation" when Electronic and Computer Music was published by Oxford University Press in 1985. The book traced the technical and creative evolution of electronic music, beginning with the invention of the dynamophone by Thaddeus Cahill in 1897. Later editions required significant revisions to the chapters on computer music due to the rapid evolution of the field.

While the series has been praised for its comprehensiveness and accessibility to the general reader, in a review of the 2004 edition James Harley suggested Manning placed too much emphasis on the history of the technology and not enough on the music.

== Personal life ==
Manning married fellow student Liz Locke in 1971. They had two children and resided in Cornsay, County Durham.

== Selected publications ==
=== Books ===
- Manning, Peter (2013). Electronic and Computer Music (4th ed.). New York: Oxford University Press. ISBN 9780199746392.
- Clarke, Michael; Dufeu, Frédéric; Manning, Peter (2020). Inside Computer Music. New York: Oxford University Press. ISBN 9780190659653.

=== Book chapters ===
- Manning, Peter (2009). "Sound Synthesis Using Computers". In Dean, Roger T. (ed.). The Oxford Handbook of Computer Music. New York: Oxford University Press. pp. 85–106. ISBN 9780195331615.
