= Amy Alexander (artist) =

American performance artist and researcher

- Known for: Professor of Visual Arts at University of California San Diego
- Website: Official website

SVEN (Surveillance Video Entertainment Network)
- Artist: Amy Alexander
- Year: 2006
- Medium: Camera, monitor, two computers, and computer vision software
- Location: Whitney Museum in New York, New York

Amy Alexander is an artist and researcher working in audio/visual performance, interactive art and software art, under a number of pseudonyms including VJ Übergeek and Cue P. Doll. She is a professor at the Department of Visual Arts at the University of California, San Diego.

== Biography ==
Alexander is a digital artist, in the areas of software art and live coding. Her works have been exhibited and performed at museums, festivals, and conferences including the Whitney Museum, Transmediale, Ars Electronica, and SIGGRAPH. She has also performed in non-art venues including nightclubs and street performances.

Alexander's first widely exhibited new media work was the net art project, The Multi-Cultural Recycler (1996/7), which was nominated for a Webby Award in 1999. She then developed the plagiarist.org website, which was known for its humorous projects related to Internet culture. Since 2012, her work has been in video installation and visual performance, most notably SVEN, Discotrope: The Secret Nightlife of Solar Cells with Annina Ruest and CyberSpaceLand. She has also written texts on historical and contemporary audiovisual performance, including a chapter in the volume of the book See This Sound - Audiology, called Compendium.

== Notable works ==
In 2005, Alexander's piece theBot was included in an exhibit at the New Museum in New York City, as part of 40 works selected by Rhizome, an organization and platform for Internet art. In 2022, Alexander's What the robot saw, a continuously updated livestream of "low engagement" YouTube videos and channels, was included in the Rencontres d'Arles film festival in Berlin, Germany and Paris, France. The livestream grabbed clips of videos with no or few views and added machine-generated subtitles.

== Education ==
Alexander attended Rowan University from 1988–1991 and received her BA in Communications: Radio/TV/Film. She then attended the California Institute of the Arts from 1993 to 1996, and received her MFA in Film/Video and New Media.

== Career ==
Alexander developed a background in programming, music, and visual media at her alma maters. She taught at the California Institute of the Arts and the University of Southern California. She also worked in television, animation, information technology and new media.

Amy Alexander is currently Professor of Visual Arts: Computing at the University of California, San Diego. Her teaching focuses on contemporary expanded cinema, visual performance, abstract cinema history, and process-based digital media art.
