= Dance technology =

Application of information technology

The terms dance technology and Dance and Technology are the application of modern information technology in activities related to dance: in dance education, choreography, performance, and research.

== Dance education ==
In education, dance technology includes various advanced media, such as video, interactive computer programs and internet., as well as training in the use of modern technologies for dance creation.

== Dance design ==
=== Dance recording and computer choreography ===
One of the earliest uses of computers for dance were carried out in the 1960s at the University of Pittsburgh, where the choreographic process was codified and manipulated by computer, although the results were not published.

In the 1970s there were several attempts to computerize the Labanotation and later the Benesh notation. These attempts naturally evolved into attempts to translate the symbolic notations into computer models of the moving human body and further to computer-assisted creation of choreographies.

=== Computer-generated choreography ===
Dorothy Jeanne Hays Beaman pioneered computational choreography, creating the piece Random Dances in 1964 by using an IBM 7070 computer to select and order movement instructions from three lists. Her 1965 article, "Computer Dance", was widely cited by later practitioners, as was a 1968 exhibition of her process at the Institute of Contemporary Arts in London.

== Research ==
=== IDAT ===
Exploration of innovative approaches to harness modern technologies in dance has been reported at the International Dance and Technology Conference. It was held at the following locations:

- The University of Wisconsin, Madison, 1992
- Simon Fraser University, British Columbia, Canada, 1993
- York University, Toronto, Canada, 1995 (Proceedings: ISBN 1-883034-01-9)
- Arizona State University in Tempe, Arizona, 1999.
