= Jeanne Beaman =

American choreographer (1919–2020)

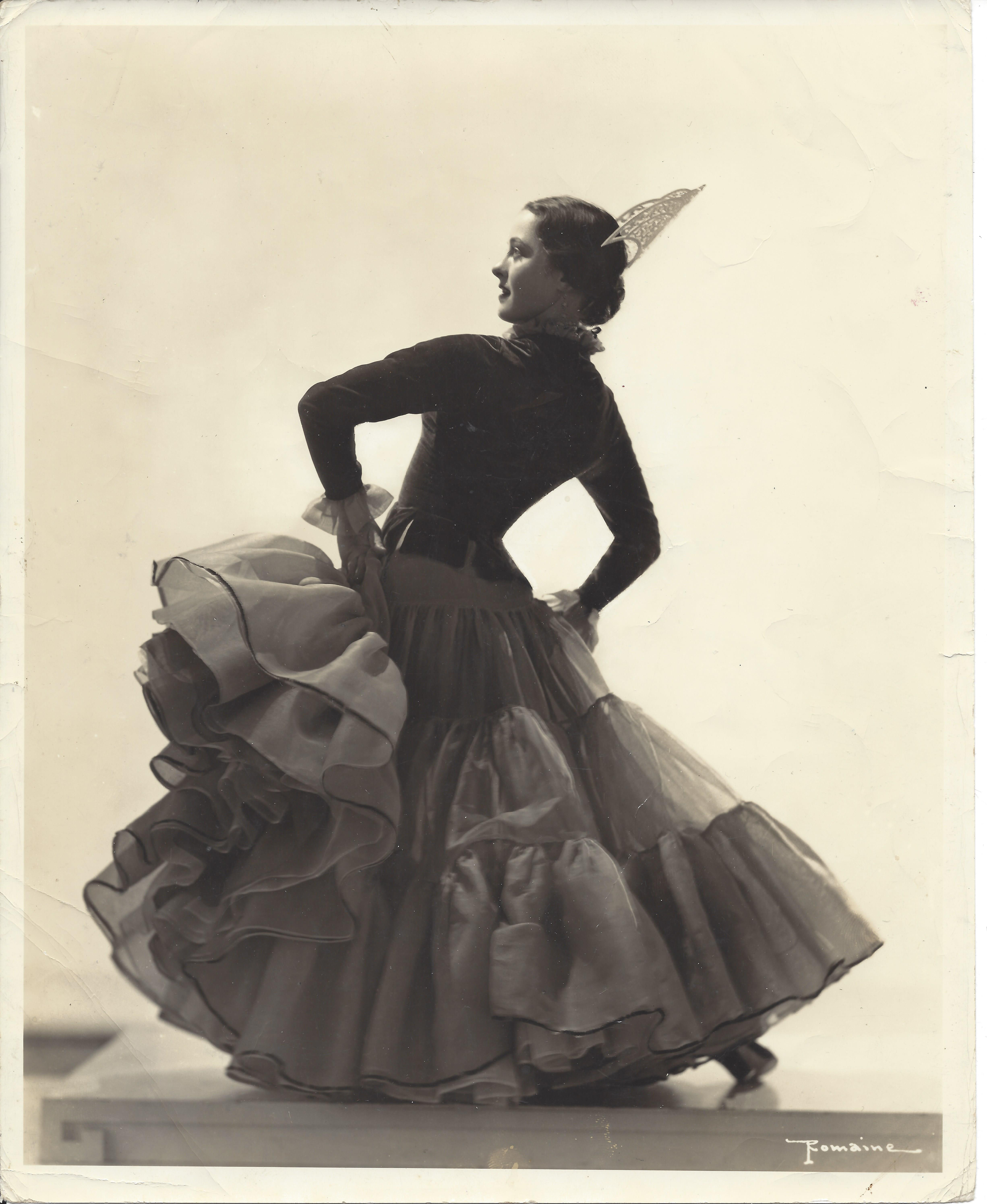
- Jeanne Beaman in the 1940s; photo by Romaine
- Born: Dorothy Jeanne Hays; October 7, 1919; San Francisco, California, U.S.
- Died: February 12, 2020 (age 100); Bernalillo, New Mexico, U.S.
- Occupations: Dancer, choreographer, college professor

Dorothy Jeanne Hays Beaman (October 7, 1919 – February 12, 2020) was an American dancer and college professor. She was a pioneer of computational choreography, creating the piece Random Dances in 1964 by using an IBM 7070 computer to select and order movement instructions from three lists.

Her 1965 article, "Computer Dance", was widely cited by later practitioners, as was a 1968 exhibition of her process at the Institute of Contemporary Arts in London.

== Early life and education ==
She was born in San Francisco and adopted in 1919 by Nora Christine Schad and Joseph Allen Hays, who lived in Berkeley, California. Starting by age 5, "Baby Jeanne Hays" gave local performances in Berkeley, California. She studied under the direction of "Miss Valerie" Quandt Harstad in Berkeley, who remained a friend and mentor for many years. At age 16, Beaman traveled alone to New York to train at the School of American Ballet.– She took extensive notes on her classes, including one by "Mr. Balanchine". In 1938, at the suggestion of May O'Donnell she attended classes at Bennington College where she studied with Martha Graham. Back in California, she studied at the University of California, Berkeley, and, following graduation, at Mills College.

== Career in dance ==
Beaman's dance career began as "Baby Jeanne Hays" in Berkeley. From 1938 to 1940, she was a member of the San Francisco Opera ballet. She danced and taught in California, including at the University of Redlands and at the University of California, Riverside, and in performances at the Redlands Bowl.

In 1955, Beaman moved with her husband and four children to Pittsburgh, where she began teaching at Chatham College (now Chatham University), and then at the University of Pittsburgh, where she taught from 1961 to 1974. In Pittsburgh she experimented with computational choreography, creating the piece Random Dances in 1964 by using an IBM 7070 computer to select and order movement instructions from three lists. Her 1965 article, "Computer Dance", was widely cited by later practitioners. A 1968 exhibition of her process was held at the Institute of Contemporary Arts in London. In 1971, she was one of the participants in Verities, Values, Visions, a dance conference held at the University of Waterloo, along with Irmgard Bartenieff, Til Thiele, Eleanor Metheny, and Daniel Nagrin, among others. While in Pittsburgh, Beaman was a founder and President of the Pittsburgh Dance Council and served on numerous dance related committees and boards in other venues.

== Personal life and legacy ==
Jeanne Hays married art professor Richard Bancroft Beaman in 1944. They had four children. After 1974, the Beamans lived in Rockport, Massachusetts, where she was active in the Massachusetts Council on the Arts and other organizations. Her husband died in 2003, and she died in Bernalillo, New Mexico, in 2020, at the age of 100. Her papers are in the Jerome Robbins Dance Division, at the New York Public Library for the Performing Arts.

Beaman's work in computer-generated choreography was further honored in exhibition at the Centre Pompidou in 2018.
