= John F. Simon Jr. =

American artist

John F. Simon Jr. (February 6, 1963, Louisiana) is a new media artist who works with LCD screens and computer programming. He currently lives and works in Warwick, New York.

Simon holds several degrees: a BA in Art Studio and a BS in Geology from Brown University (1985), a Master's degree in Earth and Planetary Science from Washington University in St. Louis (1987), and a MFA in Computer Art from the School of Visual Arts (1989). He is the recipient of the Trustees' Award for an Emerging Artist from the Aldrich Contemporary Art Museum in Ridgefield, Connecticut in 2000, and the Creative Capital Emerging Fields Award in 1999.

Simon has exhibited internationally, including New York City, Santa Fe, Berlin and Haifa. His work is found in prominent museum collections such as the Museum of Modern Art, New York, the Solomon R. Guggenheim Museum, New York, the Whitney Museum of American Art, New York, University of Iowa Museum of Art and the Los Angeles County Museum of Art, California. Simon's first European solo exhibition, Color and Time, was held September 17 - October 24, 2008, at Galería Javier López in Madrid, Spain.

In the 1990s, Simon began writing digital software to create visual imagery. His screen works display abstractions that vary infinitely due to random sequencing. The visual elements of each piece are generated in real time by his software.

More recently, Simon has made a series of large-scale compositions that incorporate laser-cut Formica and LCD screens with perpetually changing software. Each LCD screen is housed in cabinet-like structure made from Formica, which is also created by Simon's coding. In addition to his screen work, Simon is also known for his Formica cutouts, drawings on paper and digital projections of his custom software.

Simon's work has been commissioned by curator Xiaoying Juliette Yuan for her series "The Artists Creative Process" that explores world renowned artists and their creative process. In 2014, Simon sculpted the massive hanging wall piece "Moment of Expansion" which is examined from the start of the process to the finished product in Yuan's series.

In 2018, the artist was invited to The New Art Fest, an art and technology festival in Lisbon and exhibited iClock.

"My feeling is that an artist's state of mind when making a work is critical to what the work transmits to the viewer. I have always worked to improve on methods, technique, and materials, but only recently have I found that I can also improve the inner workings; I can develop the mental aspects of my art practice."

  - John F. Simon, Jr.
