= Algorave =

Genre of electronic music dance event

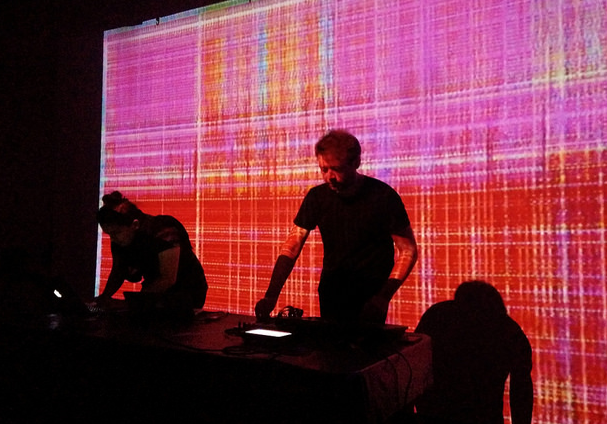

General Information
- Related genres: Electronic music, computer music, generative music, electronic dance music, techno
- Location: Worldwide
- Related events: Music festival, rave, electronic dance music festivals, circuit party
- Related topics: Live electronic music, VJ, livecoding

An algorave (from an algorithm and rave) is an event where people dance to music generated from algorithms, often using live coding techniques. Alex McLean of Slub and Nick Collins coined the word "algorave" in 2011, and the first event under such a name was organised in London, England. It has since become a movement, with algoraves taking place around the world.

== Description ==
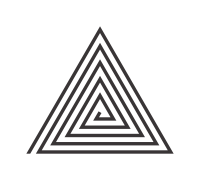
Algorave logo (a spirangle), based on a three-armed Brigid's Cross.

Algoraves can include a range of styles, including a complex form of minimal techno, and the movement has been described as a meeting point of hacker philosophy, geek culture, and clubbing. Although live coding is commonplace, any algorithmic music is welcome which is "wholly or predominantly characterised by the emission of a succession of repetitive conditionals", which is a corruption of the definition of rave music (“wholly or predominantly characterised by the emission of a succession of repetitive beats”) in the UK's Criminal Justice and Public Order Act 1994. Although algorave musicians have been compared with DJs, they are in fact live musicians or improvisers, creating music live, usually by writing or modifying code, rather than mixing recorded music.

At an algorave the computer musician may not be the main point of focus for the audience and instead attention may be centered on a screen that displays live coding, that is the process of writing source code, so the audience can not just dance or listen to the music generated by the source code but also to see the process of programming.

== History ==
Algorithmic approaches have long been applied in electronic dance music from the 1970s when Brian Eno established randomised musical practises which evolved into generative music over the course of his long career. This, in turn, influenced rave culture and techno of the 1990s by Farmers Manual, Autechre, and Aphex Twin. The Anti EP was an explicit response to the Criminal Justice and Public Order Act 1994 - specifically the track "Flutter" as a means of creating "non-repetitive beats" at raves which had been outlawed by the wording of the Act. The snare rush famously featured on the Girl/Boy EP of 1996 is an earlier form of digital algorithmic coding and featured in drum and bass influenced electronic music of the early to mid 1990s, this approach later evolving into glitch music. Traditional use of algorithms include Maypole dancing, where they are applied to the dance itself as a form of Algorithmic Choreography and bell-ringing. The first self-proclaimed "algorave" was held in London as a warmup concert for the SuperCollider Symposium 2012. However, the name was coined in 2011, after live coders Nick Collins and Alex McLean tuned into a happy hardcore pirate radio station on the way to a performance in the UK. Since then, algorave has been growing into an international movement, with algoraves having been held mainly in Europe and Asia; and few events in Australia and North America.
