= Mark Wilson =

Mark Wilson may refer to:

== Arts and entertainment ==
- Mark Wilson (artist) (born 1943), American digital artist, painter, and printmaker
- Mark Wilson (comedian), Canadian Second City alumnus
- Mark Wilson (dancer) (born 1962), Australian dancer and entertainer
- Mark Wilson (journalist and musician) (born 1969), FOX 13 Tampa news anchor and Emmy award winner
- Mark Wilson (magician) (1929–2021), American magician and magic consultant
- Mark Wilson (musician) (born 1980), Australian bass guitarist

== Sports ==
- Mark Wilson (American football) (born 1980), American football offensive tackle
- Mark Wilson (English footballer) (born 1979), English football midfielder
- Mark Wilson (golfer) (born 1974), American golfer
- Mark Wilson (rugby union) (born 1989), rugby union player for Newcastle Falcons
- Mark Wilson (Scottish footballer) (born 1984), Scottish footballer
- Mark Wilson (bowls) (born 1984), Northern Irish lawn bowler
- Mark Wilson (cricketer) (1890–1982), Scottish cricketer

== Others ==
- Mark Alan Wilson (1953–2005), American murder victim
- Mark Wilson (businessman) (born 1966), former CEO of Aviva
- Mark Wilson (judge) (1896–1956), Irish-born British colonial judge
- Mark Wilson (nonprofit executive), American nonprofit executive
- Mark Wilson (philosopher) (born 1947), American philosopher
- Mark Wilson (politician), American politician from Washington State
- Mark Wilson (priest) (born 1946), Archdeacon of Dorking

== See also ==
- Marc Wilson (disambiguation)
