= EZTV (media company) =

EZTV is a production company and exhibition venue founded in Los Angeles in 1979 by film scholar, writer and video producer John Dorr, along with several filmmakers, actors, writers, musicians and artists.

EZTV is credited with creating one of the world's first video theaters, computer art gallery and independent media center. Dorr wrote, produced and directed some of the earliest feature-length narrative films on video, and through his advocacy and example, helped spawn the current independent media revolution, seen most typically today, online, through services such as YouTube.

== Early history ==
After a series of public screenings of early EZTV videos at the West Hollywood Community Center, Dorr, with a group of EZTV co-founders that included Michael Masucci, Strawn Bovee, Mark Shepard, James Williams, Pat Miller, created in 1982 "EZTV Video Gallery", a 40-seat video theater, art gallery and media lab. The gallery's first premiere video was Dorr's Dorothy and Alan at Norma Place, making the gallery an instantaneous success, due in part to an article in the American Film Institute's American Film magazine, as well as in various local print and electronic press. Within two years, media attention had reached a national scale, and EZTV expanded to a 100-seat video theater with two gallery spaces, a production studio, five video editing rooms, a music lab and a photography darkroom. EZTV continued to receive routine local press attention through newspapers such as the Los Angeles Times, the LA Weekly, and the LA Reader, as well as various magazine, TV and radio coverage.

Filmmakers who screened at EZTV included Jean-Luc Godard, Robert Altman, Chantal Akerman, as well as artists ranging from David Hockney, Keith Haring, Yoko Ono, Bill Barminski, musicians ranging from the Red Hot Chili Peppers, Black Flag and many of the pioneering digital artists exhibited, collaborated, or lectured at EZTV.

Through the efforts of EZTV's Michael Masucci, and ia Kamandalu (aka Kim McKillip), often working in collaboration with digital artist Victor Acevedo, and art historian Patric Prince, EZTV began to become a vital center for the exploration, exhibition and advocacy of the emerging new media arts. EZTV was often the meeting place for the LA chapter of SIGGRAPH, and through the efforts of LA-SIGGRAPHS Joan Collins and Coco Conn, was the first site for SIG-KIDZ, a pioneering experiment in digital art and education. Various other organizations, including the International Documentary Association, the Long Beach Museum of Art Video Annex, the Visual Music Alliance, the California Outside Music Association and the Los Angeles Center for Photographic Studies guest-curated numerous exhibitions at EZTV.

EZTV founder John Dorr died on January 1, 1993, from the complications of HIV/AIDS. The American Film Institute's International Film Festival was named that year in his memory, and he was eulogized in obituaries in The New York Times, the Los Angeles Times, the LA Weekly, The Hollywood Reporter, Variety and Documentary magazine. Following Dorr's death, EZTV moved into a series of art organization-in-residency, including in Los Angeles Contemporary Exhibitions (LACE), from 1996–2000, and Santa Monica's 18th Street Arts Center (2000–present).

== Recent history ==
EZTV continued, under the direction of Michael Masucci and Kate Johnson, and continued the curatorial as well as production methodologies, premiering various new EZTV projects at venues such as the Museum of Modern Art (New York) the Institute of Contemporary Art (London) the Getty Center's Pacific Standard Time Festival in 2011 and various galleries, conferences and festivals.

"Hacking the Timeline", an ongoing project concerned with the historical analysis of the new media revolution, was instituted in 2003 and has staged lectures, online screenings and gallery exhibitions of classic and emerging digital art.

In 2015, Kate Johnson's film, “Mia, A Dancer’s Journey” premiered at the Film Society at Lincoln Center and was broadcast on PBS stations across the nation. The film also received an LA Emmy® Award, a Golden Mike Award and two Telly Awards.

EZTV continues today, producing original work which has screened at the Museum of Modern Art, the Institute of Contemporary Art, the American Film Institute, Bravo, the BBC, the History Channel and various galleries and festivals. EZTV is currently an organization-in-residence at the 18th Street Arts Center in Santa Monica.
