= Victor Acevedo =

American digital artist

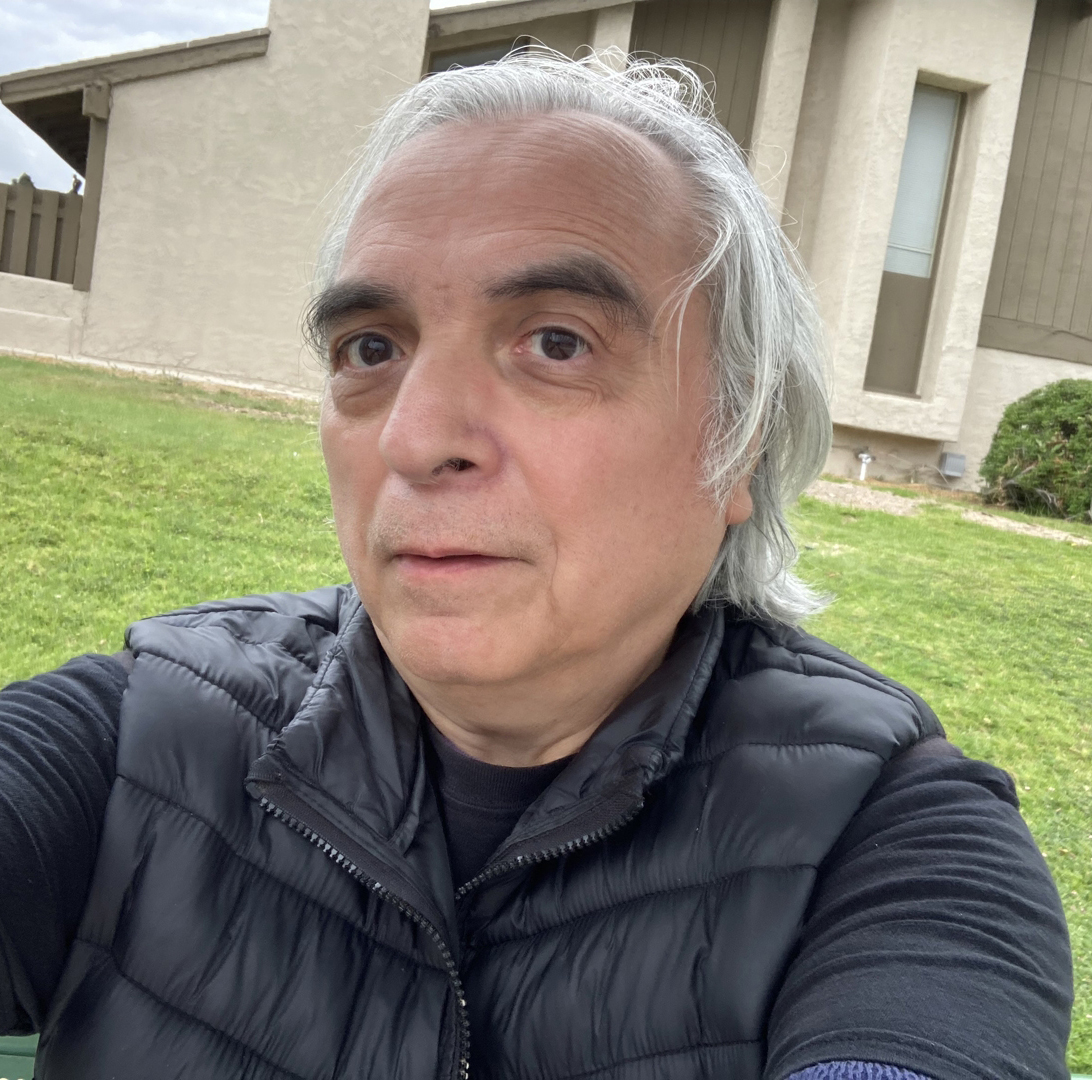
- Victor Acevedo Summer 2023
- Born: Victor Acevedo; May 1954 (age 72); Los Angeles, California
- Education: Monterey Highlands School; Alhambra High School; University of New Mexico, Albuquerque; Art Center College of Design Pasadena; Studio Arts Los Angeles
- Known for: Analog and Digital Art, Electronic Visual Music
- Notable work: Napoleonic Seal (1979) Four-Fold Rotational Wasp Slated Breakfast Ectoplasmic kitchen Tell Me the Truth February 29, 1993 v02 X-Hour The Lacemaker Vortex Engine (video) V-E Dance Study (video) Terabyte Psychedelics (video) Anonymous Real-Time (video) Proxima Nova (video)
- Movement: Digital Art, Computer Art, Cyber Art, Geometrical Surrealism, Electronic Visual Music Techspressionism
- Awards: Acevedo was awarded a medal of recognition by the M.C. Escher Foundation, in appreciation of his work documenting the 1998 Centennial M.C. Escher Congress in Rome, Italy. In 1987, Acevedo was awarded a small production grant by the Los Angeles Community Redevelopment Agency to produce a banner in Grand Hope Park DTLA
- Website: acevedomedia.com

Victor Acevedo (born Victor Carl Acevedo in May 1954) is an American artist best known for his digital work involving printmaking and video. He was introduced to computer graphics in 1980 while attending Gene Youngblood's survey class (based on his book Expanded Cinema) at Art Center College of Design in Pasadena, California.

== Career ==
Since 2007 his primary focus has been working with video and producing (electronic) visual music works. As part of his ongoing practice, he selects still images from his videos, and more recently, he has begun experimenting with minting works on the Blockchain. His hybrid imagery tends to combine figuration with geometrical abstraction and sometimes it's pure abstraction.

Acevedo is noted as "a desktop computer art pioneer" - an early adopter of pre-Windows personal computer software to create fine art in the early 1980s. He has shown his work in over 135 group and solo art exhibitions in the U.S. and Internationally since 1982.

The arc of Acevedo’s career began analog media painting and drawing in the late 1970s, and then shifting in 1983 over a 4-year period to digital media exclusively.

To date, the three main periods of Victor Acevedo’s oeuvre could be described as the following:

- 1977 to 87: Analog Art: traditional media, painting, drawing and film
- 1983 to 2007: Digital Art: archival ink jet prints and digital photo prints
- 2007 to present: Visual Music: Digital Video and Digital Prints

== Early influences ==
Acevedo's early influences were Paul Cézanne, Pablo Picasso, M.C. Escher, Salvador Dalí and R. Buckminster Fuller. A deep study of their work and ideas, led him to the genesis of his space-frame & polyhedral graphical metaphor. It is a kind of 'geometrical Surrealism' and it was quite evident in his early period analog media work. This interplay of geometry and a kind of Neo-Surrealism content carries over to both his digital print and video work.

In 1979, Acevedo was inspired by his reading of Fritjof Capra's book The Tao of Physics, which explores the parallels between modern physics and Eastern mysticism. In the chapter called Emptiness and Form there is a discussion of the ‘void’. It is a domain which is totally empty yet simultaneously full and brimming over with the potentiality of being. This mirrors the behavior of sub-atomic particles or wave phenomena in relation to an underlying field as described in Western physics. He has spoken publicly of the notion that this concept is scalable to the realm of human beings and their interactions with the environment and each other and non-human (animal) entities. With this understanding, Acevedo would embed periodic geometrical structures into his images to serve as a metaphor for this field. They functioned as a substrate for his figurative subjects. He would call this metaphor the ‘void matrix.’"VICTOR ACEVEDO - ADA | Archive of Digital Art". 10 April 2024.

Acevedo's graphic visualization of this 'void matrix' structural field metaphor in some of his early work was achieved by his adoption of various geometrical structures which are detailed in R. Buckminster Fuller's book called Synergetics: Explorations in the Geometry of Thinking. The main polyhedra net or space-frame he used is the isotropic vector matrix (IVM). It is an all-space filling network made up of alternating octahedra and tetrahedra.

== Digital prints/digital photography ==
Acevedo's work uses photography but is computer based, as the final images are created and developed digitally.

Acevedo's first important digital prints were presented as the Ectoplasmic Kitchen series produced in 1987 and exhibited for the first time in a gallery setting at the Brand Library Art Gallery in Glendale, California the following year. This was for the Annual members exhibition of the Los Angeles Center for Photographic Studies (LACPS). The show ran from February 6 to March 1, 1988. However, the true public debut of the Ectoplasmic Kitchen series was during an outdoor audio-visual performance featuring the Math Band at California State University, Los Angeles on September 30, 1987. In this context, Acevedo's computer graphic images were projected as 35mm slides.

From 1985 to 1990 Acevedo worked on and off with the PC-based Cubicomp 3D modeling and animation system. The images called Tell Me the Truth and 6.26.27.86 are key examples of his Cubicomp 3D/Targa (TIPS) paint system work from this period. His earliest video works which included computer animation were produced in 1985.

Initially the main intent of Acevedo's work was to explore the structure of space by re-visioning pictures taken from everyday life. In that, there is a metaphorical juxtaposition between everyday human activities or events and 'extra-sensory' non-anthropomorphic and crystalline energetic flow as represented by polyhedra and polyhedral nets (space frames). The use of this geometry and the graphical tension achieved by combining it with photographic data is an opportunity to represent spatial field phenomena in a way that is non-cubical and non-cubist and something other than the isolated abstract phenomenology of color contrast and resonance (color field).

== Reception ==
"Victor Acevedo creates pictures that are extremely complex in their spatial organization. Basing his images on scanned photographs of people in interiors, Acevedo works into the scene with three-dimensional modeling, opening the space to add non-cubical polyhedral elementals in various sizes and further modifying these texture and reflections. In this way Acevedo builds a space with interpenetrating three-dimensional events." - Isabelle Anderson

Acevedo's work has been described by Christian Jacquemart, an art and technology writer as “a visual memoir of 'everyday cymatic precessional resonance', that is to say there is an intent to make visible the ephemeral crystallization of 'localized psychic energy networks' which exist in non-parallel association with people and their environment."

James Faure Walker from ArtReview has praised Acevedo's work.

The 1991 Prix Ars Electronica catalogue has reviewed his work favorably.

== EZTV/Art 1990 ==
EZTV was a pioneer in independent desktop video production, microcinema, self-distribution, artist-based curating, public practice, multimedia live performance and the use of video projection in exhibition settings. It created what were among the world's first theaters dedicated to video and among the world's first art galleries dedicated to digital art.

In 1989 Victor Acevedo approached Michael J. Masucci (Founding Member and co-director of EZTV since 1979) about having EZTV host a major group show of leading computer artists, to be curated by art historian Patric Prince and co-sponsored by LA-ACM SIGGRAPH. Masucci, who among other functions at EZTV oversaw programming the wall and performance art exhibitions, immediately agreed. He decided to schedule the show to be staged during the run of the 1990 LA Festival and its affiliated Fringe Festival/Los Angeles as an official participant. Some press attention was achieved, including a segment on actor/art collector Vincent Price's television program on art collecting.

Of the hundreds of screenings, exhibitions, performances, and lectures presented at EZTV's West Hollywood space, a few stand apart as among those that resulted in the trajectory of the space and its artistic community. There was perhaps one show which more than any other, defined EZTV and pointed to the direction that it would take moving forward and become the model for its continuation to this day. That show was called ART 1990.

== Cyberspace Gallery ==
Because of the success of the exhibition ART 1990, Michael J. Masucci and historian/curator Patric Prince co-founded the CyberSpace Gallery. This was done with the help of Acevedo and other key persons including Kim McKillip (aka ia Kamandalu), Lisa Tripp, and Michael Ragsdale Wright. In 1992, CyberSpace Gallery formally opened as an important subspace for EZTV. It was dedicated to electronic art, however, with a more focused curatorial mandate toward digital work.

CyberSpace Gallery was among the first galleries dedicated to digital art. It emerged from EZTV's almost decade-long involvement in curating and presenting computer art, and contributed to greater public awareness of the desktop digital art.

== The Digilantes ==
In the mid-1980s and into the 90s, Acevedo was a founding member of a group of Los Angeles artists who embraced digital technology.

Pioneer digital artist Michael Ragsdale Wright, as an in-joke with Victor Acevedo, referred to this aforementioned group of art activists as the "Digilantes". These individuals were instrumental in establishing the digital art scene in Los Angeles. This group included artists Wright and Acevedo, Dona Geib, Michael Masucci, Mason Lyte, David Glynn, and art historian Patric Prince, whose art historical focus is art and technology. "Digilantes" is a play on words named after the self-organized 19th century 'law men' in the American West who were alert, watchful, and advocated the taking of action into one's own hands.

== 1993 to 1999 ==
In 1993 Acevedo began using the software Softimage 3D and began his distinct "silver geometry period" producing such works as Skull and Suit on the Phone as well as his underground collaborations with Andy Warhol associate, Billy Name Linich in 1997. In early 1995 Victor moved to New York City and became a digital artist in residence in the BFA Computer Art Department at the School of Visual Arts. He joined the faculty there in 1997 and later moved to the Masters level (MFA CA) program three years later.

In 1996 he created one of his most well-known images called The Lacemaker, which he named after the same-titled painting by Johannes Vermeer (1665). This piece was later featured in the ACM SIGGRAPH produced 1999 documentary called The Story of Computer Graphics. In 1998 it was exhibited in Touchware, which was the art show for ACM SIGGRAPH 1998. Also in 1996, Acevedo began experimenting with video works that were based on looped animated computer graphic polyhedral structures. In June 1998 an event that proved a validation of his early (1979–85) traditional media artwork and concepts, Acevedo was one of 13 artists invited to exhibit work alongside Escher's at the M.C. Escher Centennial Congress in Rome. Examples of both his analog and digital artwork were presented there. These were the graphite drawing, Four-fold Rotational Wasp and his early digital print called Ectoplasmic Kitchen. He was also awarded a Medal of Distinction by the M.C. Escher Foundation for his video documentary work of the congressional proceedings.

== 21st Century ==
In 2001 Acevedo’s works, David in Orense, Eric in Orense, and A Glass of Wine with Harry, were included in the digital art exhibition called Silent Motion It was a group show curated by artist and scholar James Faure Walker at the Stanley Picker Gallery at Kingston University, Surrey, England. It was inspired by and included the experimental photography of Eadweard Muybridge (1830–1904). As quoted from the show catalogue, "Silent Motion is an exhibition that looks at contemporary digital art – internet art, digital photography, plotter drawings, murals - alongside Muybridge's photographs of figures in motion. Muybridge was a native of Kingston upon Thames."

In 2002 Acevedo's essay, Space Time with M.C. Escher and R. Buckminster Fuller was published in the book Escher's Legacy: A Centennial Celebration, edited by Doris Schattschneider and Michelle Emmer (Springer-Verlag, 2002).

In 2003 his essay entitled Why Digital Prints matter was published in the ACM SIGGRAPH conference art show catalogue and visual proceedings. The art show that year was called CG03 and was curated by Michael Ragsdale Wright. Acevedo debuted two medium format prints Davis Acevedo and Nu Cynthesis.

In 2005, Acevedo's print called Tell Me the Truth (1991) was acquired by the Victoria & Albert Museum in London, as part of their acquisition of the Patric Prince Computer Art Collection. “Over a period of years Ms. Prince amassed one of the most extensive collections of computer art, consisting of around 200 original art works, and a substantial archive charting the rise of computer-generated arts” As quoted from the V&A Museum website

In November 2005, Acevedo was invited to exhibit some of his prints and give a lecture about the development of his work at an international symposium called Synergetics in the Arts at the Isamu Noguchi Museum, in Long Island City, NY. The 2-day event was co-produced by the Synergetic Collaborative (SNEC). Acevedo's talk, Art of the Void Matrix, addressed the ongoing conceptual connection between his work and that of R. Buckminster Fuller's synergetic geometry.

To date, three of Acevedo's 30”x40" archival ink-jet prints have been acquired and entered into the Anne + Michael Spalter Digital Art Collection. The prints are The Violist and NYC 83–85 in 2007 and more recently the Sunburst Couple in 2018.

Acevedo's work has been featured in several (digital) art history books. The first of which is called Art of the Digital Age, edited by Bruce Wands (Thames and Hudson 2006). The piece reproduced in this book is called Eric in Orense (2000).

In 2007 his work was cited in the ACM/SIGGRAPH's online digital art history archive. That same year Acevedo's work was discussed at length in an important and influential book called From Technological to Virtual Art, written by art historian Frank Popper, (MIT Press 2007).

Acevedo's image called Springside Cynthesis and a descriptive blurb about his work was included in Wolf Lieser's Digital Art (Ullmann/Tandem, 2009) and also in the large format 'coffee table' edition this book, re titled The World of Digital Art (h.f. Ullman, 2010)

In 2013, Acevedo’s image called 4D memory Cluster was used in the book called Moving Innovation: A History of Computer Animation.

For ACM SIGGRAPH 2026 as part of the Digital Arts Committee (DAC) project called A New Media Techexpressionists Architectures - Augmented Reality (AR) Exhibition Experiment, Acevedo participated in a collaborative project with composer and creative coder, Alessandro Fadini and digital artist and technologist, Joel Zika.

== Electronic Visual Music EVM ==
Following the natural evolution of his work, in 2007-09 Acevedo shifted his primary attention to producing digital video works. Exploring the implications of synesthesia and cymatics as well as the use of computer animation based on Buckminster Fuller's Synergetics, much of his video work investigates the intersection of electronic music and audio synthesis as in drone or glitch works, harmonic noise and dynamic geometrical structure. Later he began integrating a real-time video mix workflow into his audio-visual (AV) studio practice. Acevedo initially positioned himself inside the genre called Visual Music. In 2011 he joined Los Angeles Video Artists (LAVA) and started attending their monthly meetings. Within that community he learned how to perform and project live mix video via apps that can run on a MacBook Pro. For a couple of years (2012–2014) he explored applying his motion graphic work to real-time live visuals for underground or non-mainstream EDM events (Drum and Bass and Dubstep). In doing so he combined his interest in contemporary electronic bass music with concepts in Digital Cinema and Synergetic Geometry. His music video work and live visual (VJ) performances were informed by a synthesis of both these traditions, disciplines, and resultant phenomenologies.

In 2013 Acevedo coined the term electronic visual music. Its acronym is EVM. It was a play on EDM and an update of the genre called Visual Music. He first attached it to a Drum and Bass monthly that he was planning but the events were put on hold. The first time he used the term publicly was for an AV performance event at Los Angeles Center for Digital Art in May 2019.

Since 2014, Acevedo has been exploring the realm of pure abstraction to a greater degree. Thus, establishing a new body of work in parallel to his oeuvre which addresses figurative subjects. In late 2015, slipping easily back into the fine-art community, he began showing fairly regularly at the [[Los Angeles Center for Digital Art]] (LACDA) in Downtown Los Angeles. Acevedo's ongoing collaboration and dialogue with design scientist Thomas Miller and architect Fabiano Cavichioli has been an enormous influence on his current practice, especially in the application of Miller's ground breaking work known as New Tools Geometry which is based on Buckminster Fuller's Synergetics.

While Acevedo will occasionally project visuals for live abstract music, circuit bending or modular synthesis shows, he has taken a step back to revisit his 'lifetime' of work in order to convey its story and evolution as a whole. This period of time included his 2017 career survey artist talk and his 2019 retrospective exhibition, both at LACDA and then soon thereafter his video retrospective at Digital Debris gallery in early 2020.

== Acevedo in Context: The Book ==
In November 2022, Acevedo’s name-sake company, Acevedomedia published a book called ACEVEDO in Context: Analog Media 1977-1987 Digital Media 1983 – 2020 It is an illustrated 43-year career survey and biography. The book’s narrative is augmented by essays from four contributing authors, Peter Frank, Charlotte Frost, Thomas Miller and Michael J. Masucci. The essays are presented along with quotations and notes by the artist himself. The text also includes transcriptions from previously unpublished writings and interviews with Patric Prince and Arthur Lee Loeb. The book it has been noticed and/or reviewed by such publications as the LA Weekly and the electronic edition of the Leonardo Journal of the International Society for the Arts, Sciences and Technology.

== On the Blockchain ==
In 2021 Acevedo began to make some of his work available in the NFT art space. He has participated in several NFT exhibitions produced by Searchlight.Art and partners, IRL (in real life), and in various metaverses.

As of April 2022, Acevedo has 6 collections, combined totaling over 100 works, on the OpenSea NFT platform.

On May 8, 2023, Acevedo launched his genesis drop on Objkt.com, for the Tezos blockchain as curated by NFTuesdayLA. The primary offering of 25 editions of his vintage 1987, piece called Metalogue v01.02 sold out in just over 24 hours.

== Techspressionism ==
2021 was also the year that the new art-historical term Techspressionism began gaining traction and a wider international acceptance. It has been defined by its inventor Colin Goldberg as “an artistic approach in which technology is utilized as a means to express emotional experience.” Acevedo’s work fits well within its definition and as a result, he was included in several key Techspressionist IRL and metaverse exhibitions in 2021 and 2022, including Techspressionism: Digital & Beyond at the Southampton Art Center, April 21-June 4, 2022.

From June 24 to the 26th, Acevedo was invited to show one of his EVM videos at the International Digital Media and Arts Association, iDMAa 2022 conference in their exhibition called Weird Media, curated by Patrick Lichty.

== Publications ==
=== Books ===
- Computer Graphics Art Work (To. Nagata, Graphic-sha, 1992)
- Cyber Arts: Exploring Art & Technology (L. Jacobson ed., Miller Freeman Inc. 1992)
- Escher's Legacy: A Centennial Celebration (D. Schattschneider & M. Emmer eds., Springer-Verlag 2002)
- Art of the Digital Age (Bruce Wands, Thames and Hudson, 2006)
- From Technological to Virtual Art ( Frank Popper, MIT Press 2007)
- Digital Art (Wolf Lieser, Ullman /Tandem 2009)
- The World of Digital Art (Wolf Lieser, h.f.Ullman, 2010)
- Moving Innovation: A History of Computer Animation (Tom Sito, MIT Press 2013)

=== Catalogues ===
- 1990: SIGGRAPH: LA. ART 1990 - LA Chapter of ACM|SIGGRAPH
- 1991: Prix Ars Electronica 1991: International Compendium of the Computer Arts - Dr. Hannes Leopoldseder / ORF Landesstudio
- 1993 Art LA ‘93 8th International Los Angeles Art Fair Acevedo's work was included with the EZTV/Cyberspace booth Los Angeles Convention Center Dec. 2-5
- 1993: FISEA 4th International Symposium on Electronic Art MCAD Minneapolis, MN
- 1994: Computer Kunst '94 Golden Plotter 1994 Gladbeck, DE
- 1994: 2nd Annual Digital Salon 1994 School of Visual Arts New York City, NY
- 1996: 4th Annual Digital Salon 1996 School of Visual Arts New York City, NY Leonardo Journal Vol. 29 No. 5
- 1998: Homage to Escher - Group exhibition with Escher @ The M.C. Escher Centennial Congress in Rome - Museo Labortorio D' Arte Contemporanea
- 1998: Touchware: ACM|SIGGRAPH98 electronic art and animation catalogue - Computer Graphics annual conference series - ACM|SIGGRAPH
- 2001: Catalogue for SILENT MOTION a Digital Art group show was curated by artist and scholar James Faure Walker @ Stanley Picker Gallery at Kingston University, Surrey, England. Works include David in Orense, Eric in Orense, and A Glass of Wine with Harry. In July, 'Silent Motion' traveled to the Colville Place Gallery hosted by Keith Watson in London W1T 2BG
- 2003: CG03: SIGGRAPH 2003 electronic art and animation. This includes Acevedo's essay called "Why Digital Prints Matter"
