= Helen A. Harrison =

American art historian, curator, journalist, and author (born 1942)

- Born: December 4, 1943 (age 82); Jamaica, Queens
- Occupations: art historian, curator, journalist and author

Helen A. Harrison (born December 4, 1943) is an American art historian, curator, journalist and author. Harrison was the longtime director (1990-2024) of the Pollock-Krasner House and Study Center, the former home and studio of the Abstract Expressionist artists Jackson Pollock and Lee Krasner in East Hampton, New York. She is known for her books, essays, reviews and exhibitions devoted to modern American art, and a series of historical mystery novels set in the New York art world.

From 1978 to 2006, Harrison was an art critic for The New York Times Long Island section. Her arts commentaries, “Art Waves,” were heard on WLIU FM, Long Island University’s NPR-affiliated radio station, from 2004-2009. “Eye On Art,” her monthly column for the Sag Harbor Express, ran from 2010 to 2020.

== Early life and education ==
Helen Amy Harrison was born in Jamaica, Queens, and raised in Richmond Hill. Her father, Joseph Harrison, was an executive with Kennecott Copper Corporation. Her mother, Alice Helen, née Quortrup, was a school secretary. A half-brother, Steven Joseph Harrison (1947-2023), was a medical illustrator.

Harrison was graduated from Richmond Hill High School and took art classes at the Art Students League of New York before attending Adelphi University (1961-65), from which she received a bachelor's degree in studio art, specializing in sculpture. She also studied sculpture on a Max Beckmann Scholarship at the Brooklyn Museum Art School and at Hornsey College of Art in London, England, before receiving her master's degree in art history from Case Western Reserve University in Cleveland, Ohio (1975).

== Professional career ==
Harrison moved to England in 1966 to attend Hornsey and continued to work as a sculptor. In 1967 she married the British painter Roy Nicholson, whom she had met at the Brooklyn Museum Art School. The couple first lived in London, then in Skelton, Cumbria, while Nicholson served as the Visual Arts Officer for Northern Arts, a regional arts council. An early interest in government art patronage led Harrison to pursue graduate study of the New Deal art projects at Case Western with Prof. Karal Ann Marling, who was organizing a major survey exhibition, “Federal Art in Cleveland, 1933-1943,” which opened in 1974. The catalog included Harrison’s entries on the mural and easel projects, and she served as the exhibition coordinator, which prompted her decision to pursue a curatorial career.

After receiving her master's degree, Harrison worked as Marling’s research assistant on three exhibitions before becoming the curator of the Parrish Art Museum in Southampton, New York, in 1977. In 1978, a chance meeting with the editor of The New York Times Long Island section led to a 28-year association with the paper, for which she wrote regular art reviews and occasional feature articles until the section was discontinued in 2006.

In 1979, Harrison accepted an invitation from the Queens Museum in Flushing, New York, to organize an exhibition devoted to the 1939/40 New York World’s Fair. (The museum occupies the former New York City Building, which was built for the Fair.) The exhibition, “Dawn of a New Day: The 1939/40 New York World’s Fair,” was presented in 1980, followed by a show devoted to the Fair’s Theme Center, the Trylon and Perisphere, in 1981. From 1980-82, she served as director of the Public Art Preservation Committee, a short-lived initiative funded by the New York State Council on the Arts to document and advocate for works of art in public spaces in New York City. She became the curator of Guild Hall Museum in East Hampton, New York in 1982. She left Guild Hall in 1990 to become the director of the Pollock-Krasner House and Study Center, from which she retired in January 2024.

Harrison became involved in Techspressionism in 2011, when she wrote a catalog essay for artist Colin Goldberg, who coined the term as the title for a solo exhibition. Harrison was responsible for the redefinition of Techspressionism from an "artistic style" to an "artistic approach." She later became a champion of the movement and an advisor to its first group exhibition at Southampton Arts Center in 2022.

== Non-fiction publications ==
Harrison’s articles, essays, and reviews have appeared in many publications, including the Journal of American Studies, Prospects, American Art, Provincetown Arts, Wintertur Portfolio and the Archives of American Art Journal. She has also written many exhibition catalogues and contributed to several multi-author publications, including Remembering the Future: The New York World’s Fair from 1939 to 1964 (Rizzoli, 1989), Elaine de Kooning (Georgia Museum of Art, 1992), Abstract Expressionism: The International Context (Rutgers University Press, 2007), Ary Stillman: From Impressionism to Abstract Expressionism (Merrell, 2008), and Jackson Pollock: A Centennial Retrospective (Yomiuri Shimbun, 2011). She is the editor of Such Desperate Joy: Imagining Jackson Pollock (Thunder’s Mouth Press, 2000), Subject Matter of the Artists: Writings by Robert Goodnough 1950-1965 (Soberscove Press, 2013), co-editor of Guild Hall for All (DelMonico Books, 2021) and the contributor of 110 entries to ART/USA (Phaidon Press, 1999). Her books include Larry Rivers (Harper & Row, 1984), Hamptons Bohemia: Two Centuries of Artists and Writers on the Beach (with Constance Ayers Denne) (Chronicle Books, 2002), the Jackson Pollock Box (Cider Mill Press, 2010) and Jackson Pollock (Phaidon Press, 2014).

== Mystery novels ==
Harrison has published a series of mystery novels, collectively titled the Art of Murder, set in the 20th century New York art world, with a mixture of real and fictional characters. Her second novel, An Accidental Corpse (Dunemere Books, 2018/Poisoned Pen Press, 2020) won the Benjamin Franklin Gold Award for Mystery & Suspense.
