= Michael Wright =

Michael, Mick, Mickey or Mike Wright may refer to:

== Sportspeople ==
- Michael Wright (Australian footballer) (born 1959), former VFL footballer for South Melbourne
- Michael Wright (basketball) (1980–2015), American–Turkish basketball player
- Michael Wright (cyclist) (1941–2026), English professional road bicycle racer from 1962 to 1976
- Michael Wright (field hockey) (1922–2001), Singaporean Olympic hockey player
- Michael Wright (swimmer) (born 1966), Hong Kong swimmer
- Mick Wright (footballer, born 1946), English football right back with Aston Villa
- Mick Wright (footballer, born 1950), English football defender with Darlington
- Mickey Wright (1935–2020), American golfer
- Mike Wright (defensive end) (born 1982), American football player
- Mike Wright (quarterback) (born 2001), American football quarterback
- Mike Wright (baseball) (born 1990), American baseball player
- Mike Wright (cricketer) (born 1950), New Zealand cricketer

== Other ==
- Michael Wright (actor) (1956–2026), American film and television actor
- Michael Wright (architect) (1912–2018), Hong Kong architect
- Michael Wright (Australian politician) (born 1956), Australian Labor Party member of the South Australian House of Assembly
- Michael T. Wright (curator) (born 1948), curator of mechanical engineering at the Science Museum and at Imperial College
- Michael T. Wright (university administrator) (1947–2015), British academic, vice-chancellor of Aston University and professor of mechanical engineering
- Michael Wright (academic) (1952–2019), professor of entrepreneurship
- Wonder Mike (born 1957), American rapper, born Michael Wright
- Michael Ragsdale Wright (born 1944), American artist
- Michael W. Wright (1938–2020), Minneapolis business executive
- Michael Wright (Australian businessman) (1937–2012), Australian heir and businessman
- Michael Wright (diplomat) (1901–1976), British diplomat
- Sir Michael Wright (born 1932), British judge
- Michael Wright (writer) (died 1969), Australian writer of radio and television drama
- Michael Wright (Canadian Army officer), Canadian general

== See also ==
- John Michael Wright (1617–1694), British portrait painter
