= Symphony in Three Movements =

1945 symphony by Igor Stravinsky

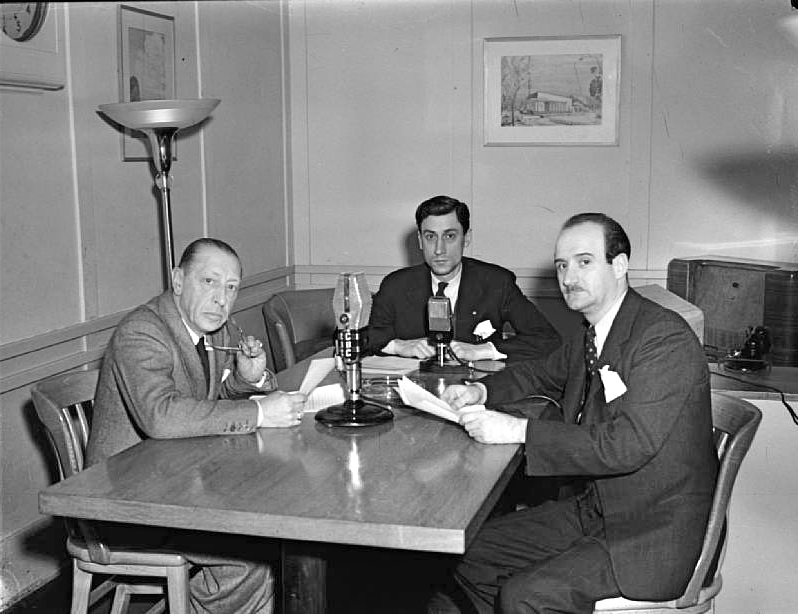
Stravinsky (left), Roger Baulu, and Jean-Marie Beaudet at Radio-Canada, Montreal, 4 March 1945

The Symphony in Three Movements is a work by Russian expatriate composer Igor Stravinsky. Stravinsky wrote the symphony from 1942–45 on commission by the Philharmonic Symphony Society of New York. It was premiered by the New York Philharmonic Orchestra under Stravinsky on January 24, 1946.

The Symphony in Three Movements is considered Stravinsky's first major composition after emigrating to the United States. It uses material written by Stravinsky for abandoned film projects.

A typical performance of the symphony lasts 20–25 minutes.

== Background ==
In 1943, Stravinsky had begun work on rescoring his ballet The Rite of Spring. Although the project was left incomplete, his revisit to this earlier composition appears to have influenced the symphony. The ostinatos and shock tactics of the last movement, for example, recalls the "Glorification of the Chosen One" and "Sacrificial Dance" from The Rite, and some woodwind passages are reminiscent of the ballet's introduction. On the other hand, there are passages forecasting the opera The Rake's Progress, notably the openings of the slow movement and the finale.

Material is drawn from projects that Stravinsky had abandoned or reorganized. The piano's presence in the first movement stems from a piano concerto that was left incomplete. Music for harp is prominent in the second movement, using themes he had written for the film adaptation of Franz Werfel's novel The Song of Bernadette. Stravinsky was initially informally approached for the writing of the film score. On 15 February 1943 he started writing music for the "Apparition of the Virgin" scene. In the event, no contract was ever signed with him, and the project went to Alfred Newman, who won an Oscar. The third movement unites the first two movements by giving equal emphasis to piano and harp.

== Music ==
The symphony is scored for an orchestra of piccolo, 2 flutes, 2 oboes, 3 clarinets in B♭ and A (3rd doubling bass clarinet), 2 bassoons, contrabassoon, 4 horns, 3 trumpets in C, 3 trombones, tuba, timpani, bass drum, piano, harp, violins I & II, violas, cellos, and double basses.

The three movements are as follows:

1. Overture; Allegro (about 10 minutes)
2. Andante; Interlude: L'istesso tempo (about 6 minutes)
3. Con moto (about 6 minutes)

Stravinsky, who rarely acknowledged extramusical inspirations for his music, referred to the composition as his 'war symphony'. He claimed the symphony as a direct response to events of the Second World War in both Europe and Asia. The first movement was inspired by a documentary on Japanese scorched earth tactics in China. The third movement deals with footage of German soldiers goosestepping and the Allied forces' mounting success.

In contrast to Stravinsky's earlier Symphony in C, the Symphony in Three Movements is much more turbulent and chromatic. From a purely musical standpoint, the symphony hearkens back to Stravinsky's earlier styles of composition while retaining a firmly neoclassical identity.

== Adaptations ==
In 1972, George Balanchine choreographed a ballet, also named "Symphony in Three Movements," to Stravinsky's score.

From 1979 to 1980, the American intermedia artist, Jack Ox, produced three visual mappings from Stravinsky's Symphony in Three Movements.

The San Francisco Symphony's recorded performance of the piece was nominated for a Grammy Award for Best Orchestral Performance in the Classical Music category as part of the 68th Grammy Awards.

== Notes ==
https://www.nycballet.com/discover/ballet-repertory/symphony-in-three-movements
