= Fallen Fruit (film) =

2024 American dramedy film

- Theatrical film poster
- Directed by: Chris Molina
- Written by: Chris Molina
- Produced by: Victor Acevedo; Carolina Caruso; Chris Molina
- Starring: Ramiro Batista; Austin Cassel
- Cinematography: David Ricardo Rodriguez
- Edited by: Brian Olyaryz; Joe Turman
- Music by: Eli Feingold; Damian Gutierrez
- Release dates: April 5, 2024 (Miami); June 26, 2024 (Frameline)
- Running time: 87 minutes
- Country: United States
- Language: English

Fallen Fruit is a 2024 American dramedy film, directed and written by Chris Molina. The film stars Ramiro Batista and Austin Cassel. It premiered at the Miami Film Festival in 2024.

== Synopsis ==
A heartbroken 20-something reluctantly returns to his childhood home in Miami, where he's forced to reevaluate his relationships in the face of a looming hurricane.

== Cast ==
- Ramiro Batista as Alex
- Austin Cassel as Chris
- Adrian Menendez as Juan
- Joanne Perica as Lisa
- Nicole Quintana as Mom
- Ozzie Quintana as Dad
- Joe Tufte as Jared
- Krystal Millie Valdes as Sam

== Reception ==
Robin C. Farrell of Film Festival Today rated the film 3/5 stars, and lauded: "The film's main strengths are in its visuals and nonverbal storytelling. The overall tone is casual, candid and—despite the inclusion of cell phones and contemporary dialogue—with something of an inviting timelessness to the whole thing." Rubén Rosario of Miami ArtZine, on the contrary, opined: "That's what happens when a character is strictly defined by his lack of direction. Did Chris Molina intend viewers to give a damn about this pouting sourpuss? His [film] isn't rotten, exactly, just unremittingly bland."

Georgi Petkov of Loud and Clear Reviews gave it 2.5/5 stars, and compared it with the film Aftersun (2022): "Although thematically different and less polished, [this film] strikes some faint stylistic resemblances to Charlotte Wells's [film], a masterfully poignant father-daughter story told through minimalist cinematography and a series of recorded summer memories. To be more specific, Molina gives the impression of being loosely inspired by the aestheticism of Wells's work, from the vintage videotapes down to the framing and composition."
