= Colin Goldberg =

American artist (born 1971)

Colin Adriel Goldberg
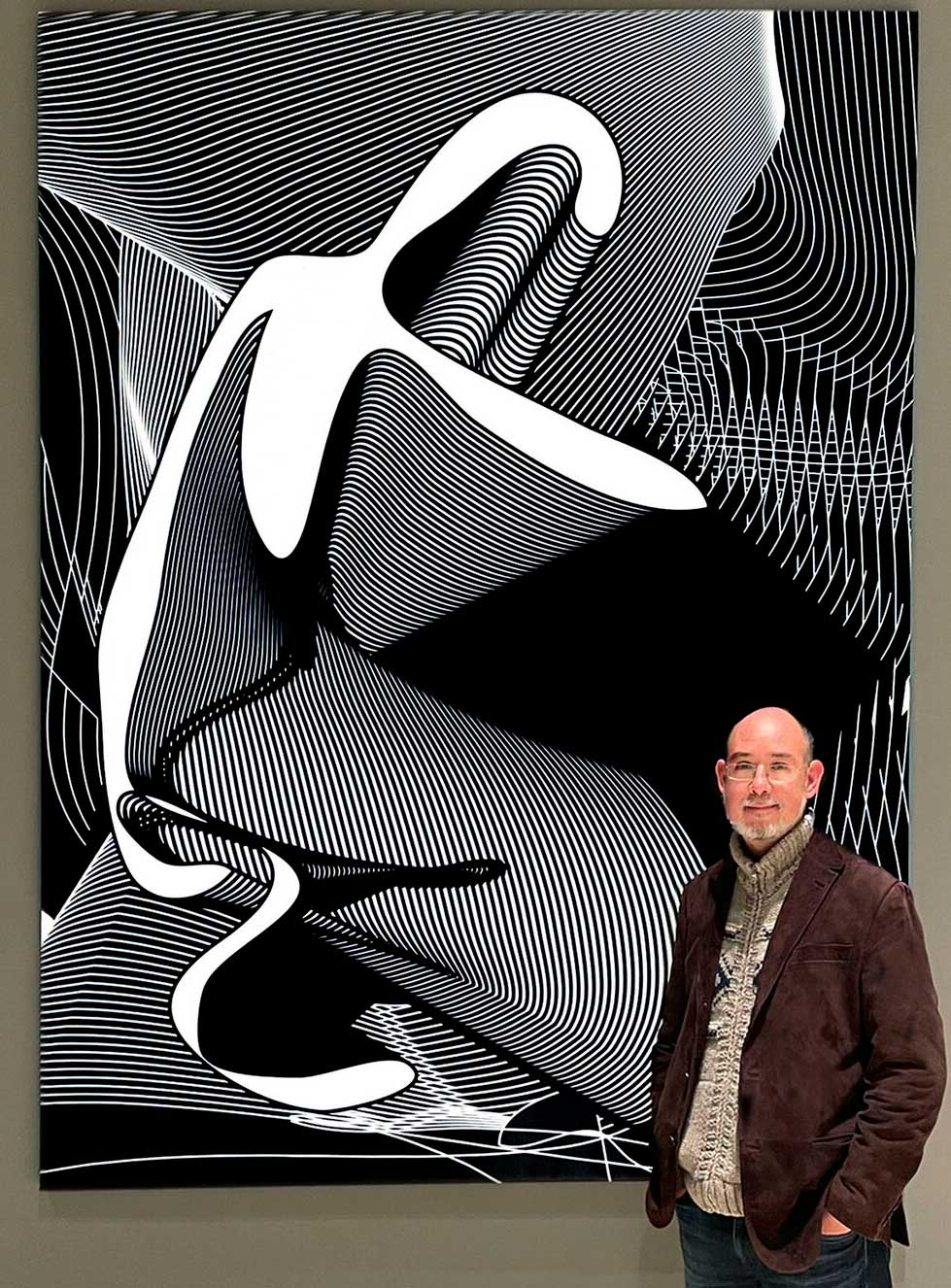
- Colin Goldberg with his work, Kneeling Icon
- Born: December 23, 1971 (age 54); Bronx, New York
- Known for: Digital art, drawing, painting
- Movement: Techspressionism
- Awards: Pollock-Krasner Foundation (2013)
- Website: goldberg.art

Signature
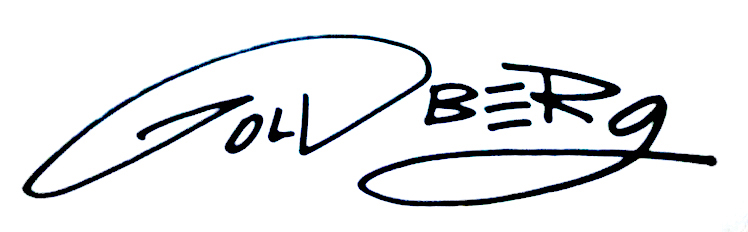

Colin Adriel Goldberg (born December 23, 1971) is an American visual artist known for his role in the development of Techspressionism.

== Early life and education ==
Colin Goldberg was born in the Bronx, New York in 1971 to parents of Japanese and Jewish ancestry. He grew up on the East End of Long Island.

As an undergraduate student, Goldberg studied Studio Art at Binghamton University under the Abstract Expressionist painter Angelo Ippolito. He would later go on to attend graduate school at Bowling Green State University in Ohio.

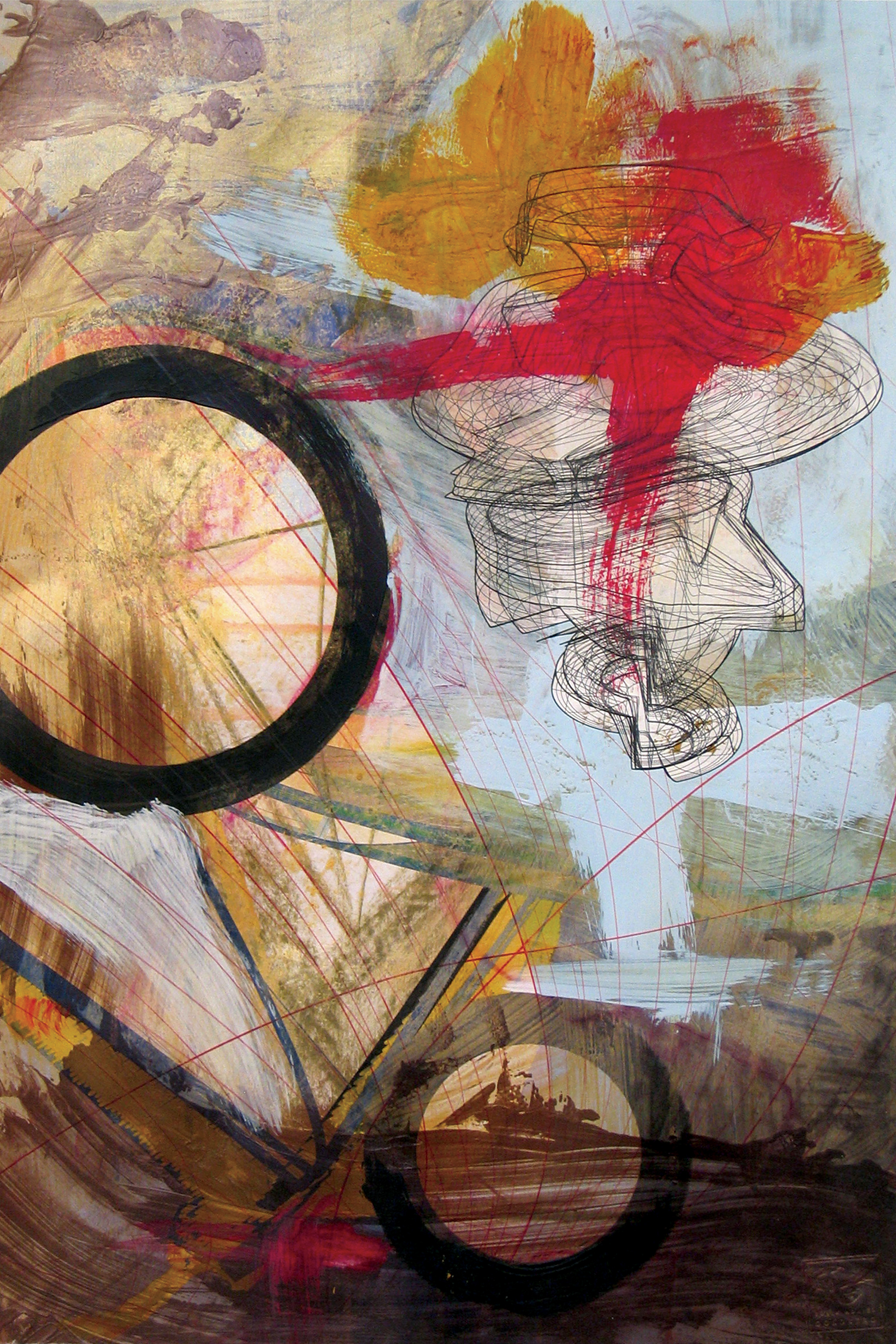
Portals (2006) acrylic and archival inkjet on paper

== Career ==
After completing his undergraduate degree, Goldberg moved to New York City's East Village, where he worked in digital design for advertising firms. It was at this time that he began his artistic experimentation with digital tools.

Goldberg coined the term Techspressionism in 2011 as the title of a solo exhibition in Southampton, New York. The catalog essay was written by Helen A. Harrison, Director of the Pollock-Krasner House and Study Center, who described Techspressionism as the next phase of development in Expressionist ideas.

Goldberg was awarded an artist grant from the Pollock-Krasner Foundation, which he used to purchase a large-format printer for his studio. In 2014, he wrote the Techspressionist Manifesto as a reaction to the fine art community's resistance to technology. Techspressionism was first described as a movement in Wired magazine later that year.

In 2015, he was an artist-in-residence at The Studios of Key West.

In September 2020, Goldberg organized the first "Techspressionist Salon" artist meetup on Zoom, which included artists Steve Miller, Patrick Lichty and Oz Van Rosen as well as Harrison, who agreed to act in an advisory role to the nascent artist group. The salons have continued as a bi-weekly meetup of the group.

Harrison suggested that an exhibition be organized around Techspressionist, and in April 2022, “Techspressionism — Digital & Beyond,” the first such exhibition, opened at the Southampton Arts Center in Southampton, New York. Curated by Goldberg, the show included work by more than 90 artists from 20-plus countries. The use of the hashtag #techspressionism on Instagram is the primary way that the idea has proliferated globally, with over 40,000 Instagram posts using the hashtag as of April 2022.

== Artistic style and influences ==
Goldberg was influenced by the Abstract Expressionist painters of the 1950s, including his undergraduate painting professor Angelo Ippolito, who first introduced him to abstraction. The artist began to incorporate abstraction into his work when he began working professionally with computers in New York City in the mid-1990s.

Other influences include the artist's maternal grandmother Kimiye Ebisu, a calligrapher who taught shodō in Hawaii and Japan. The influence of Japanese aesthetics on the artist's work was explored by artist and writer Eric Ernst, grandson of the surrealist painter Max Ernst and son of the abstract expressionist artist Jimmy Ernst.

== Personal life ==
Goldberg lives and works in Vermont. He has a daughter, Aya.
