= Roman Verostko =

American artist and educator (1929–2024)

Roman J Verostko
- Born: Joseph Verostko; September 12, 1929; Tarrs, Pennsylvania, U.S.
- Died: June 1, 2024 (aged 94); Minneapolis, Minnesota, U.S.
- Occupation: Professor Emeritus at MCAD
- Known for: Algorithmic art

Roman Verostko (September 12, 1929 – June 1, 2024) was an American artist and educator who created code-generated imagery, known as algorithmic art. Verostko developed his own software for generating original art based on form ideas he had developed as an artist in the 1960s. His software controls the drawing arm of a machine known as a pen plotter that was designed primarily for engineering and architectural drawing. In coding his software Verostko conceives of the machine's drawing arm as an extension or prosthesis for his own drawing arm. The plotter normally draws with ink pens but Verostko adapted oriental brushes to fit the drawing arm and wrote interactive routines for achieving brush strokes with his plotters. In 1995, he co-founded the Algorists with Jean-Pierre Hébert.

== Biography ==
Roman Verostko was born in Tarrs, Pennsylvania, a coal-mining town fifty miles east of Pittsburgh. A painter in his early life, he also studied as a Benedictine monk at Saint Vincent Seminary in Latrobe, Pennsylvania, from 1952 to 1968, joining the faculty there in 1963. His monastic travels took him to places such as New York, Washington, and Paris. After leaving religious life in 1968, he continued experimenting with automatic drawing that led him to explore methods of writing code to achieve some form of computer automatism. This led him to redirect all his artistic practices toward algorithmic art. He married Alice Wagstaff in August 1968. She was a psychologist and gave seminars at the monastery when Verostko met her. She died in 2009. He resided in Minneapolis, Minnesota, where he taught at the Minneapolis College of Art and Design (MCAD) from 1968 to 1994 and held the title of Professor Emeritus. Verostko died in Minneapolis on June 1, 2024, at the age of 94.

== Education ==
After graduating from high school, Verostko studied at the Art Institute of Pittsburgh, where he received a diploma in illustration in 1949. In 1950 he entered the Saint Vincent Archabbey scholastic program for monks that included entrance to Saint Vincent College, monastic vows in 1954, a BA in philosophy in 1955, four years of Theology in the St. Vincent Major Seminary and ordination as a priest in 1959. While Verostko remained a monk attached to Saint Vincent Archabbey, he pursued graduate work in the early 1960s at other institutions, first in an MFA program at Pratt Institute in 1961, then studies in art history at New York University and Columbia University from 1961 to 1962. Verostko then traveled to Paris, where he studied printmaking at Stanley William Hayter's Atelier 17 from 1962 to 1963, as well as took courses at the École du Louvre and visited religious sites. Much of Verostko's work in Paris "pursued visual manifestations of inner experience that transcended rational observation". For many of these 'automatic' works he maintained a private notebook of 'experience states' related to their execution". Perhaps unsurprisingly, Hayter worked very closely with the Surrealists, exploring semi-automated methodologies for image-making in the belief that its source was the irrational. Hayter also associated with many of the forerunners of the Algorists, among them Le Corbusier. Many of the themes Verostko would explore in his life's work - EXAMPLES - emerged in this time period in and around Paris.

He resumed creating abstract expressionist paintings and toured an innovative light-and-sound show he had created based on the Psalms, while editing the New Catholic Encyclopedia in Washington, D.C.

Verostko wrote his first code in punch cards at the Control Data Institute in the late 1960s. In the summer of 1970, with a Bush Foundation Fellows Grant to explore "the humanization of new technologies", he worked with Gyorgy Kepes at MIT's Center for Advanced Visual Studies (CAVS). "But my real coding work began with the first personal computers, the Apples we had in '78 and the IBM that came out in August 1981," he said.

== Artworks ==
In 1982, Verostko developed an interactive program which produced a computer-generated light show called the "Magic Hand of Chance". It operated with 32 kb of memory and was written in BASIC with a first-generation IBM PC. The "Magic Hand" was capable of running for days without repeating itself. He went on to create his Hodos software, an integrated program of routines that, to his mind, attempted to mime some of the procedures he had used in his pre-algorist years. His first pen plotter, a Houston Instruments DMP-52, with 14 pen stalls, provided a rich palette of inks for his drawing routines. He also created routines for driving oriental brushes adapted to the machine's drawing arm. By 1987 he had integrated expressive brush strokes with colorful clusters of pen strokes. Examples of his algorithmic plotter work include the Pathway series, the Pearl Park Scriptures, the Diamond Lake Apocalypse and the Manchester Illuminated Universal Turing Machine, produced in honor of Alan Turing.

In 1990, Verostko published an artist's book in honor of George Boole, in a limited edition. Each copy of the book contains unique multi-pen plotter drawings with the frontispiece including a single brush stroke created using the same algorithm.

In 2008, Verostko installed an "upside-down" mural, with 11 units spanning two stories inside the main entrance of the Fred Rogers Early Childhood Learning Center located on the Saint Vincent College campus, Latrobe, Pennsylvania. The images are digital transformations of his original pen and ink drawings created for an "Upsidedown Book" in the 1970s. His "Upsidedown Book" was published and dedicated to Fred Rogers on August 2, 2008.

== Awards and honors ==
- 1970 Bush Leadership Fellow
- 1971, 1974 Outstanding Educators of America
- 1995 ARTEC '95, Recommendatory Prize.
- 1994 Golden Plotter Award, First Prize, Gladbeck, Germany
- 1993 Prix Ars Electronica, Honorary Mention
- 2009 SIGGRAPH Distinguished Artist Award for Lifetime Achievement: Roman Verostko, Leonardo - Volume 42, Number 4, August 2009, p. 297. The other 2009 recipient was Lynn Hershman Leeson.
- 2021 St Vincent College, Verostko's alma mater, names its Verostko Center for the Arts, an exposition space and archives, in his honour

== Public collections ==
His work is held by the Victoria and Albert Museum, Minneapolis Institute of Arts, Saint Vincent College, Spalding University in Louisville, and the Frey Science and Engineering Center at the University of St. Thomas in St. Paul. His drawings have also been featured in over 30 exhibitions in shows in Rome, Berlin, Istanbul, Lima, Tokyo and New York.

== Bibliography ==
- Roman J. Verostko, O.S.B., The Westmoreland County Museum of Art, Greensburg, Pennsylvania, April 2 - May 2, 1965.
- Sculptures de Ciment. Monastery de Saint-Vincent, Roman Verostko, Art D'Église, Brughes, No: 142 1968.
- Spalter, Anne Morgan (1999). The Computer in the Visual Arts. Addison Wesley. ISBN 0-201-38600-3.
- Machine-Made Works that Look Crafted by Hand", Chronicle of Higher Education, March 2nd, 2001, End Paper / Chronicle review of Roman Verostko's Exhibition of Algorithmic Fine Art.
- Wands, Bruce (2006). Art of the Digital Age. London: Thames & Hudson. ISBN 0-500-23817-0.
- Faure-Walker, James (2006). Painting the Digital River. Prentice Hall. ISBN 0-13-173902-6.
- Lieser, Wolf (2009). Digital art. Ullmann. ISBN 978-3-8331-5337-2.
- Edward A. Shanken (2009). Art and electronic media. London: Phaidon. ISBN 978-0-7148-4782-5. p. 23.
- Form, Grace and Stark Logic: 30 years of algorithmic drawing, Leonardo, MIT Press Vol. 43, No. 3, pp. 230–233, 2010.
- Beddard, Honor and Dodds, Douglas (2009). Digital pioneers. London: Victoria and Albert Museum. ISBN 978-1-85177-587-3
- Taylor, Grant D.(2014). When the Machine Made Art: The Troubled History of Computer Art, New York, Bloomsbury.ISBN 978-1-6235-6884-9
- Shao-Lan Hertel, "Lines in Translation: Cross-Cultural Encounters in Modernist Calligraphy, Early 1980s–Early 1990" YISHU: Journal of Contemporary Chinese Art, Vol 15, Number 4, July/August 2016, pp 6–28.
