= Jean-Pierre Hébert =

American artist (1939–2021)

Jean-Pierre Hébert (1939 – March 28, 2021) was an American artist of French origin. He specialized in algorithmic art, drawings, and mixed media. He co-founded the Algorists in 1995 with Roman Verostko. From 2003 until his death, he held an artist-in-residence position at the Kavli Institute for Theoretical Physics (KITP) at the University of California, Santa Barbara.

Hébert was born in Calais, France, and grew up in Vence. He worked for many years in the field of computer science even as he pursued his art. He eventually settled in Santa Barbara, California. He was a pioneer in the field of computer art from the mid-1970s on, merging traditional art media and techniques, personal software, plotters, and custom built devices to create an original body of work. He cited the American artist Anni Albers as an early inspiration and noted that he first read about her work in an IBM brochure. He was the recipient of Pollock-Krasner Foundation and David Bermant Foundation awards. In 2012, he received the ACM SIGGRAPH Distinguished Artist Award for Lifetime Achievement in Digital Art.

Hébert produced works on paper, including ink and pencil drawings, paintings, etchings and dry points from polymer and copper plates, and digital prints. He also created sand, water and sound installations, algorithmic visual music, works for wall displays, physics based algorithmic pieces, and more. His work was exhibited extensively and was frequently juried in the SIGGRAPH Art Gallery. Several museums and institutional collections hold his works, including the digital art collections of the Mary and Leigh Block Museum of Art (Northwestern University, Chicago) and the Victoria and Albert Museum (London). The Art Vault of the Thoma Foundation in Santa Fe, New Mexico featured one of his works, "Circle of Squares" (1992) in its 2021 exhibition entitled, "Saint Somebody: Technologies of the Divine."

In 2003, he became the artist in residence at the Kavli Institute for Theoretical Physics (KITP) at the University of California, Santa Barbara (UCSB). He assumed this role at the invitation of the KITP's then-director and Nobel-prize-winning physicist, David Gross. At the KITP he organized several Algorists group shows. These shows included Hans Dehlinger, Channa Horwitz, Roman Verostko (in 2006), Jean-François Colonna, Helaman Ferguson, Casey Reas (in 2008), and David Em, Paul Hertz, Robert Lang (in 2009) (in 2011).

He died on March 28, 2021, at the age of 81.

== Sources ==
- Lieser, Wolf (2009). Digital Art: H. F. Ullmann Germany. ISBN 978-3-8331-5338-9.
- Faure-Walker, James (2006). Painting the Digital River: Prentice Hall. ISBN 0-13-173902-6.
- Santa Barbara Contemporary Arts Forum (2008). Drawing With the Mind, Catalog. ISBN 1-880658-28-3.
- Spalter, Anne Morgan (1999). The Computer in the Visual Arts: Addison Wesley. ISBN 0-201-38600-3.
- Varichon, Anne & Rocella, Carlo (2006). Etre Sable: Editions du Seuil. ISBN 2-02-084334-X.
- Wands, Bruce (2006). Art of the Digital Age, London: Thames & Hudson. ISBN 0-500-23817-0.
