= Pacific Standard Time: Art in L.A., 1945–1980 =

Contemporary art history initiative

Pacific Standard Time: Art in L.A., 1945–1980 was a scholarly initiative funded by the J. Paul Getty Trust to historicize the contributions to contemporary art history of artists, curators, critics, and others based in Los Angeles. Planned for nearly a decade, PST, as it was called, granted nearly 60 organizations throughout Southern California a total of $10 million to produce exhibitions (on view between September 2011 and April 2012) that explored the years between 1945 and 1980. Underscoring the significance of this project, art critic Roberta Smith wrote in The New York Times:

Before [PST], we knew a lot [about the history of contemporary art], and that lot tended to greatly favor New York. A few Los Angeles artists were highly visible and unanimously revered, namely Ed Ruscha and other denizens of the Ferus Gallery, that supercool locus of the Los Angeles art scene in the 1960s, plus Bruce Nauman and Chris Burden, but that was about it. After, we know a whole lot more, and the balance is much more even. One of the many messages delivered by this profusion of what will eventually be nearly 70 museum exhibitions is that New York did not act alone in the postwar era. And neither did those fabulous Ferus boys.

ARTnews named the initiative as the decade's most important exhibition and cited how its archival research project had already impacted the history of art by the end of the decade through multiple exhibitions of historically underrepresented work.

== Among the artists included ==
- Vija Celmins
- Jay DeFeo
- Sonia Gechtoff
- Wally Hedrick
- Craig Kauffman
- Linda Nishio
- Gordon Wagner
- Kate Johnson

== Participating arts institutions ==
The following organizations presented exhibitions in conjunction with Pacific Standard Time:

- 18th Street Arts Center, Santa Monica
- A+D Architecture and Design Museum, Los Angeles
- American Museum of Ceramic Art (AMOCA), Pomona
- Armory Center for the Arts, Pasadena
- Art, Design & Architecture Museum, University of California, Santa Barbara
- Autry National Center, Los Angeles
- Berkeley Art Museum and Pacific Film Archive, University of California, Berkeley
- California African American Museum (CAAM), Los Angeles
- California Institute of the Arts (CalArts) / REDCAT, Los Angeles
- California Museum of Photography, University of California, Riverside
- Chapman University Guggenheim Gallery, Orange
- Chicano Studies Research Center, University of California, Los Angeles
- Chinese American Museum, Los Angeles
- City of Los Angeles, Department of Cultural Affairs
- Craft and Folk Art Museum (CAFAM), Los Angeles
- Craft in America, Los Angeles
- Crossroads School, Sam Francis Gallery, Santa Monica
- Eames House Foundation, Pacific Palisades
- Fisher Museum of Art, University of Southern California, Los Angeles
- Fowler Museum, University of California, Los Angeles
- Getty Conservation Institute, Los Angeles
- The J. Paul Getty Museum, Los Angeles
- Getty Research Institute, Los Angeles
- The GRAMMY Museum, Los Angeles
- Hammer Museum, University of California, Los Angeles
- Huntington Library, Art Collections, and Botanical Gardens, San Marino
- Institute for Arts and Media, California State University, Northridge
- Japanese American National Museum, Los Angeles
- Laguna Art Museum, Laguna Beach
- LA><ART, Los Angeles
- Los Angeles Nomadic Division (LAND)
- Long Beach Museum of Art (LBMA)
- (LACE) Los Angeles Contemporary Exhibitions
- Los Angeles County Museum of Art (LACMA)
- Los Angeles Municipal Art Gallery
- MAK Center for Art and Architecture at the Schindler House, West Hollywood
- Sam and Alfreda Maloof Foundation for Arts and Crafts, Rancho Cucamungo
- Mingei International Museum, San Diego
- Museum of Contemporary Art (MOCA), Los Angeles
- Museum of Contemporary Art San Diego
- Museum of Latin American Art (MOLAA), Long Beach
- Natural History Museum, Los Angeles
- Norton Simon Museum, Pasadena
- ONE National Gay & Lesbian Archives, Los Angeles & West Hollywood
- Orange County Museum of Art, Newport Beach
- Otis College of Art and Design Ben Maltz Gallery, Los Angeles
- Pacific Asia Museum, Pasadena
- Palm Springs Art Museum
- Pasadena Museum of California Art
- Pomona College Museum of Art, Claremont
- Santa Barbara Museum of Art
- Santa Monica Museum of Art
- Scripps College, Ruth Chandler Williamson Gallery, Claremont
- University Art Gallery, University of California, Irvine
- University Art Museum, California State University, Long Beach
- Vincent Price Art Museum, East Los Angeles College
- Watts Towers Arts Center, Los Angeles
- Frederick R. Weisman Museum of Art, Pepperdine University, Malibu

== See also ==
- Pacific Standard Time: LA/LA
