= Michael Ragsdale Wright =

Michael Ragsdale Wright, also known as M. Ragsdale Wright (born 1944), is an American visual artist, painter, and educator. He works in both traditional and electronic media.

== Early life and education ==
Michael Ragsdale Wright was born January 26, 1944, in La Grande, Oregon. He holds a BFA degree in painting and drawing, and a BA degree in European history from the University of Washington, in Seattle.

== Career ==
Wright began his career as a painter, but began to explore digital media in the mid-1980s on an Amiga computer. He exhibited his first digital prints in 1989 and continues to work in both traditional and electronic media. His portrait of digital art curator and collector Patric Prince, made in 1991, is now in the Victoria and Albert Museum.

His work has exhibited included in exhibitions, articles, and books including The Computer in the Visual Arts by Anne Morgan Spalter and Cyberarts: Exploring Art & Technology by Linda Jacobs. He and his work have been featured on Agent X, Television Tokyo, at "ACM 1:Beyond Cyberspace" in San Jose in March 2001. He was also featured at "CyberArts X" and "The Impact of YLEM: 20 Years of Art, Science and Technology" both in San Francisco 2001, and "Computer Graphics World" 25th Anniversary Retrospective" in January 2002. Howard Fox, curator of modern art for the Los Angeles County Museum of Art has called Wright's digital work, "Down and dirty, with underlying tension. "Elizabeth A. T. Smith, former curator at the Los Angeles Museum of Modern Art, called Wright's work, "powerful, evocative, an equally charged carrier of meaning about memory, time and transformation." Wright's digital work is represented by the Spectra Digital Arts Gallery in New York City.

Wright was professor in the digital media and liberal studies programs at Otis College of Art and Design in Los Angeles. He has also taught at California State University, Los Angeles. He formally served on the Siggraph education committee and the Siggraph traveling exhibition committee. Wright also instructs on a regular basis for the Los Angeles County Museum of Art.

In 1990, he was awarded a grant from the Cultural Affairs Department of the city of Los Angeles.

== Selected bibliography ==
- Beil, Kim. "’Hacking the Timeline’ at the 18th Street Arts Center," ARTWEEK April 2006
- Ruben, Cynthia. "’Hacking the Timeline’ at the 18th Street Arts Center," DASH, London UK
- Dolores Glover Kaufman & Joe Nalven. SIGGRAPH/L.A. 2005, September 2005
- Ruben, Cynthia Beth. "Digital By Choice: Imaging In The Pre-Photoshop Era," Leonardo Electronic Almanac, May 2005
- Masucci, Michael. "Quantum Entanglement and the EZTV Online Museum," Computer Graphics, 2004
- Eber, Dena. "SIGGRAPH 2003 Art Gallery: Balancing the Technological Ethos," [www.intelligentagent.com Intelligent Agent], Summer/Fall '03
- Gervers, Janet. "SIGGRAPH Culture Experiences: SIGGRAPH Conference 2003," Computer Graphics
- Moltenbrey, Karen. "SIGGRAPH Art Gallery," Computer Graphics World, June 2003, pp. 40–43
- "25 Year Retrospective: Digital Art," Computer Graphics World, January 2002, pp. 18–23
- Moltenbrey, Karen. "Pixel Perfect: Michael Wright," Computer Graphics World, November 2001, pp. 44–45
- Sanchez, Andres. "Los Artistas Desconocidos Tienen un Sitio en la Red," @RROBA, June 2001, pp 58–59,
- Luster, Gary. "Artist Produces Digital Paintings on Amiga," Micro Publishing News, December 1997, p. 70
