= Marc Wilson =

Topics referred to by the same term9

Marc Wilson may refer to:

- Marc Wilson (American football) (born 1957), American football quarterback
- Marc Wilson (footballer) (born 1987), Irish footballer
- Marc Wilson (photographer), British photographer

== See also ==
- Mark Wilson (disambiguation)
- Marco Wilson (born 1999), American football cornerback
- Marcus Wilson (disambiguation)
