= Patric Prince =

American art collector (1931–2021)

- Born: Patricia Lucina Doherty; 5 May 1942; Tucson, Arizona, US
- Died: 10 April 2021 (aged 78); Carlsbad, California, US
- Education: University of California, Berkeley, California State University
- Occupations: Art historian, curator, collector
- Known for: Digital art collection

Patric D. Prince (5 May 1942 – 10 April 2021) was an American art historian, curator and collector of early digital art. Her collection of some 250 computer-generated artworks was acquired by the Victoria and Albert Museum in 2008, along with an extensive archive of books, journals and ephemera.

She was born Patricia Lucina Doherty, in Tucson, Arizona and raised in San Jose, California. She studied art history at the University of California, Berkeley and obtained an MA at California State University. She married Charles N. Prince in London in 1969 and kept his surname when they divorced in 1977. Her partner for many years was Robert E. Holzman, who founded the Computer Graphics Lab at the Jet Propulsion Laboratory in Pasadena, CA. Holzman died in California on 9 June 2020. Patric died in Carlsbad, CA, on 10 April 2021, aged 78.

Prince was involved in many activities with ACM SIGGRAPH in the 1980s and 1990s. In 1986 she chaired the ACM SIGGRAPH Art Show, which included a major retrospective survey of computer art. She also organized the SIGGRAPH Traveling Art Show from 1989 to 1996. In 1992 she co-founded the CyberSpace gallery in Los Angeles, with Michael J. Masucci. Prince has also written extensively about the history of digital art, including women digital artists.

== Patric Prince Collection ==
Prince's internationally important collection of digital art was built up over many years. She knew many of the artists personally, and acquired individual works via gift or purchase. A senior curator at the V&A, Douglas Dodds, first visited her in southern California in 2003. The collection was then donated to the American Friends of the V&A in 2005 and loaned to the Museum for several years. Ownership was transferred to the V&A in 2008. At much the same time, she also donated her extensive archive of books, journals, reference files and other ephemera direct to the Museum.

The Patric Prince Collection includes artworks by many prominent digital artists, including Paul Brown, David Em, Herbert W. Franke, Jean-Pierre Hébert, Ken Knowlton, Vera Molnar, Frieder Nake, Georg Nees, Barbara Nessim, A. Michael Noll, Georg Nees, Lillian Schwartz, Roman Verostko and Mark Wilson (artist).The artworks are listed in the V&A's collections database, while the books and other archival materials are listed separately.

In 2008 the V&A and Birkbeck undertook a research project entitled Computer Art and Technocultures, the aim of which was to investigate the recently acquired Patric Prince Collection. The project was funded by the UK's Arts and Humanities Research Council and completed in 2010. One of the outcomes was an exhibition entitled Digital Pioneers, held in the Museum's Prints and Drawings galleries from 2009 to 2010.

Many works from the Patric Prince Collection were also included in another V&A exhibition, Chance and Control: Art in the Age of Computers, from 7 July to 18 November 2018. The show subsequently toured to Chester Visual Arts and Firstsite, Colchester.

A display entitled Patric Prince: Digital Art Visionary was held at the V&A from 14 August 2023 to 8 September 2024. The show included a small selection of artworks and ephemera from her extensive collection.
