= Low-complexity art =

Concept of art that can be described by a computer program

Low-complexity art was described by Jürgen Schmidhuber in 1997, defined as art that can be described by a short computer program (that is, a computer program of small Kolmogorov complexity). The topic has been referenced by other scientific articles.

== Overview ==
Example of bytebeat music

Schmidhuber characterizes low-complexity art as the computer age equivalent of minimal art. He also describes an algorithmic theory of beauty and aesthetics based on the principles of algorithmic information theory and minimum description length. It explicitly addresses the subjectivity of the observer and postulates that among several input data classified as comparable by a given subjective observer, the most pleasing one has the shortest description, given the observer's previous knowledge and his or her particular method for encoding the data. For example, mathematicians enjoy simple proofs with a short description in their formal language (sometimes called mathematical beauty). Another example draws inspiration from 15th century proportion studies by Leonardo da Vinci and Albrecht Dürer: the proportions of a beautiful human face can be described by very few bits of information.

Schmidhuber explicitly distinguishes between beauty and interestingness. He assumes that any observer continually tries to improve the predictability and compressibility of the observations by discovering regularities such as repetitions and symmetries and fractal self-similarity. When the observer's learning process (which may be a predictive neural network) leads to improved data compression the number of bits required to describe the data decreases. The temporary interestingness of the data corresponds to the number of saved bits, and thus (in the continuum limit) to the first derivative of subjectively perceived beauty. A reinforcement learning algorithm can be used to maximize the future expected data compression progress. It will motivate the learning observer to execute action sequences that cause additional interesting input data with yet unknown but learnable predictability or regularity. The principles can be implemented on artificial agents which then exhibit a form of artificial curiosity.

While low-complexity art does not require a priori restrictions of the description size, the basic ideas are related to the size-restricted intro categories of the demoscene, where very short computer programs are used to generate pleasing graphical and musical output. Very small (usually C or JavaScript) programs that create music have been written: the style of this music has come to be called "bytebeat".

== The larger context ==
The idea of an intimate relationship between mathematical structure and visual appeal is one of the recurring themes of Western art and is prominent during several of its periods of fluorescence including that of dynastic Egypt; Greece of the classic era; the Renaissance (as already noted); and on into the geometric abstraction of the 20th century, especially as practiced by Georges Vantongerloo and Max Bill.

== See also ==
- Computer art
- Digital art
- Infinite compositions of analytic functions
- Mathematics and art
