= Steve Miller (artist) =

American multi-media artist (born 1951)

Steve Miller (born October 12, 1951, in Buffalo, New York) is an American multi-media artist, who makes paintings, screenprints, artist books, and sculptures. Through his art, he explores the influence of science and technology on modern culture.

== Education ==
Miller received his BA in 1973 from Middlebury College, and also attended the Skowhegan School of Painting and Sculpture in 1973.

== Career ==
Steve Miller has lived and worked between New York City and Eastern Long Island since 1975. His career trajectory consists of over 50 solo exhibitions at venues such as the National Academy of Sciences, the Hong Kong Arts Centre, Rose Art Museum, the Centre International d’Art Visuels CARGO in Marseilles, and the CAPC musée d'art contemporain de Bordeaux. His work has also been included in group exhibitions at the New Museum, the Bronx Museum, The Brooklyn Museum of Art, and The Everson Museum of Art. Guild Hall and the Parrish Art Museum. In 2004 Miller was a New York Foundation for the arts painting fellow.

His work or reviews of his work have been published in Le Monde, La Nouvelle Republique, Art Press, Beaux Arts Magazine, Süddeutsche Zeitung, South China Morning Post, The New York Times, Artforum, Art News and Art in America.

Miller is a regular contributor and editor at Musee Magazine.

== Significant artworks ==
He was an early pioneer of the Sci-Art movement.

Major projects include a multimedia computer installation which analyzed financial commodity trading and the distribution of contemporary art exhibited at White Columns Gallery in 1981.

Later Miller began to silk-screen computer generated images onto painted canvases and in 1986 The Josh Baer Gallery (New York), exhibited his computer enhanced Rorschach blots screenprints. This series was also exhibited in Paris in 1988 at Galerie du Genie. Miller continued showing in Paris with Albert Benamou in 1991 with electron microscope images of pathology and in 1993 with a series of portraits using x-rays, MRI and DNA. In 1995 he began his Vanitas series in which he photographed his own blood with a microscopic camera and displayed them on light boxes. This work has been exhibited at the CAPC Musée Bordeaux, Hong Kong Arts Center, and Universal Concepts Unlimited (NYC).

In 1999 Miller created Dreaming Brain, with artist Colin Goldberg, an interactive computer movie about dreaming and reflects the complexity of the unconscious mind. This project was sponsored by Thundergulch and funded by the Greenwall Foundation and exhibited at the Equitable Art gallery in New York City.

In collaboration with scientists from the Brokehaven National Laboratory and Rockefeller University Miller developed multiple screen printing projects visualizing advanced scientific research called Neolithic Quark and Spirialing Inwards. This work has been exhibited in solo exhibitions at the Rose Art Museum and the National Academy of Sciences. Following and influential trip to Brazil, in 2005, for a group exhibition at Galeria Mercedes Viegas, Rio de Janeiro, Miller was inspired to develop a new body of work that continued for over 15 years. Health of the Planet, is a series of x-ray photographs of Amazonian flora and fauna, and was exhibited at Oi Futuro Ipanema, Brazil in 2013. This work has also been shown in solo exhibitions in Rio de Janeiro at Galeria Tempo, in Switzerland at Galeria Rigassi, in London at Gallery Maya, in East Hampton, New York, at Harper's Books, Sara Nightingale Gallery in Watermill, NY, and for his second solo exhibition in 2017 at the National Academy of Sciences, Washington, D.C. and Second Street Gallery in Charlottesville, Va. This series was published as two books by G Editions, Radiographic: X-ray Photo Inventions and Surf/Skate: Art and Board Life.

Miller visited CERN, Geneva in January 2012 and lectured to the Theory Group. From that experience and a subsequent visit, resulted in a photography and painting project that continues today.

=== Fashion, Surf and Skate ===
Miller made an Amazon journey to Belém, Brazil in 2011. After meeting Oskar Metsavaht who had also just returned from a trip to Belem, Miller collaborated on a surf fashion line for Osklen, Brazil. Robert Knafo invited Miller to produce fashion for Art Multiples as well as produce a rug with an image of a chalk board at CERN for Kathmandu Projects, an art production company. James Paul Cheung worked with Miller on a series of Mongolian cashmere scarves with images from the Amazon and CERN. They worked together to produce a line of fashion Covid masks from sustainable bamboo cotton sold under the label James Paul Cheung. Miller continued his work in fashion under his trademark Health of the Planet.

Brazil was a significant influence on Miller where he admired the cultural life style and love of surfing. Thinking of the surfboard as trophy, Miller began producing unique hand made surfboards with images of x-ray plants and animals from the Amazon which can be seen in his two books published by G Editions. The surfboards have been exhibited in Brazil at Arte Rio, Galeria Tempo and in the collection of the Museu de Arte do Rio. As well as exhibited at Madoo Conservancy, Southampton Art Center and Guild Hall. Miller subsequently continues this series to include images from CERN on surfboards that he calls ChalkBoards. The skatedeck company Always Timeless, commissioned Miller to make a limited edition of matching x-ray python skate decks. In addition, he makes handmade unique skate decks that have been sold at the New Museum, Guild Hall and on-line.

== SaaS Business ==
After visiting CERN, Miller understood that quantum mechanics involved a massive data search through the billions of particle collisions in the search for the Higgs Boson. Observing the importance of data led Miller to consider the significance of data for the art world. The initial ideas were nurtured at the NEW INC incubator at the New Museum in 2014. Along with Sean Green and Ray Nguyen, Miller co-founded ARTERNAL. Founded in 2015, ARTERNAL, based in USA & Canada, was the first technology company to focus exclusively on bringing Customer Relationship Management (CRM) technology to the art world. Evolving over the years, ARTERNAL is now an all-in-one platform providing Revenue & Relationship Management, Inventory Management, Productivity and Workflow tools for art dealers, art gallery owners, and their staff within one consolidated platform.
