= Tarrs, Pennsylvania =

Unincorporated community in Pennsylvania, US

Tarrs
- Unincorporated community
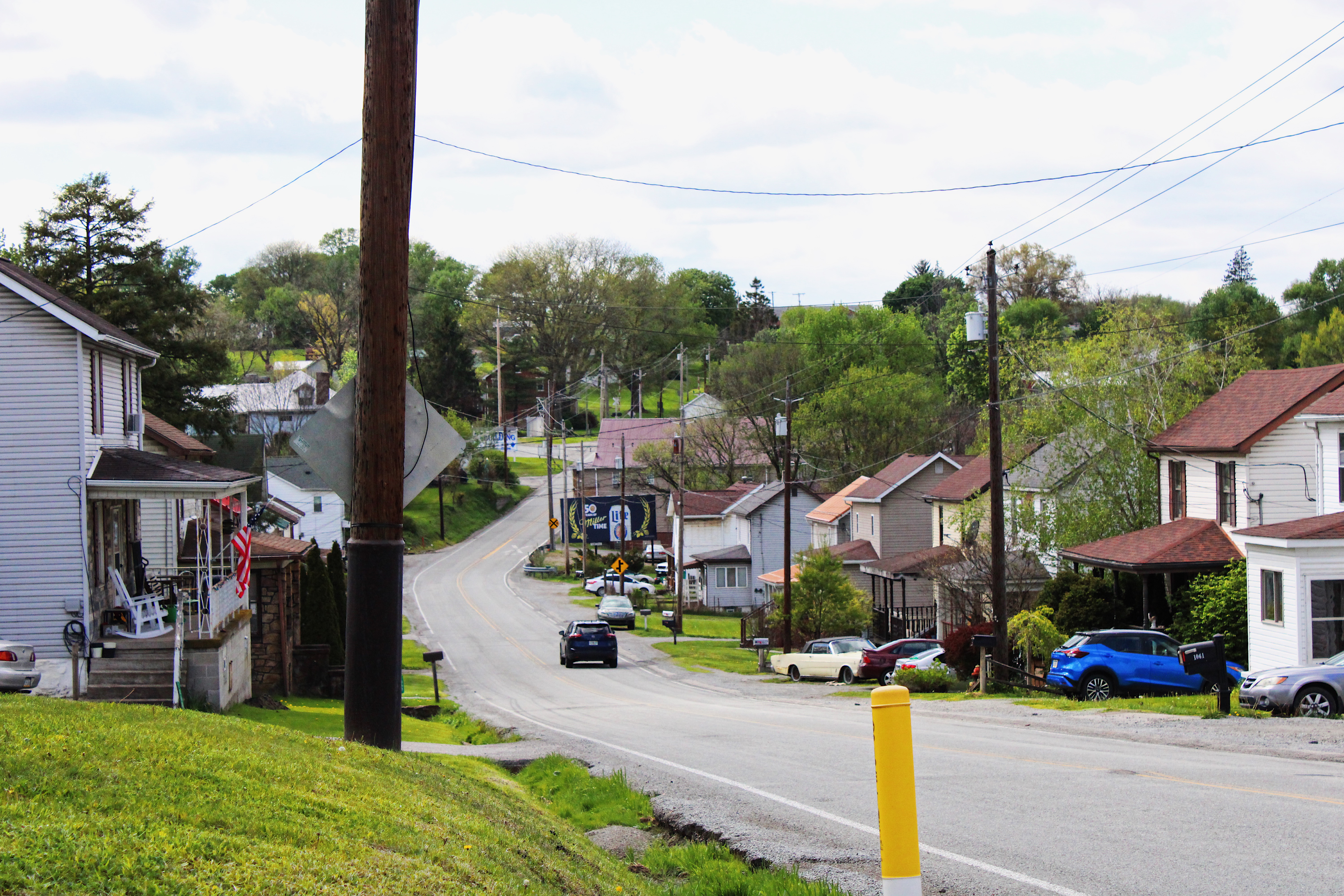
- PA 31 eastbound in Tarrs

- Location within the state of Pennsylvania Tarrs (the United States)
- Coordinates: 40°10′12″N 79°35′53″W
- Country: United States
- State: Pennsylvania
- County: Westmoreland
- Elevation: 1,158 ft (353 m)
- Time zone: UTC-5 (Eastern (EST))
  - Summer (DST): UTC-4 (EDT)
- ZIP codes: 15688
- GNIS feature ID: 1189287

Tarrs is an unincorporated community and coal town that is located in East Huntingdon Township, Westmoreland County, Pennsylvania, United States.

Situated on Pennsylvania Route 31 approximately three miles (4.8 km) west of Mt. Pleasant, it is the only location in Pennsylvania known to have an active and running ACA Allertor 125 Civil Defense warning siren.

== History ==
Tarrs Honor Roll (c. 1948)

Tarrs has its own post office, with zip code 15688. It was established in April 1828.

The town was the site of a coal mine, first developed in 1873 by D. A. Dillinger and Brothers. It was later acquired by the Southwest Coal and Coke Company and was known as the "No. 3" mine. Approximately 250 coke ovens were eventually located there.

In 1906, historian John Newton Boucher described Tarrs as being located along "the South-West Branch of the Pennsylvania Railroad" between Ruffs Dale and Alverton. Boucher also mentioned a location in Westmoreland County known as Tarr Station, presumably related to the railroad.

By 1910, the population had reached roughly five hundred. The mine and coke works closed in 1923.

== See also ==
ACA Allertor 125 warning/Civil Defense siren video on Wikimedia Commons.
