= Jack Ox =

Artist

Jack Ox is an intermedia artist and an acknowledged pioneer of music visualization.

Since the 1970s, Ox has produced works in response to diverse musical sources, including Gregorian chant, the classical concert tradition and the sound poetry of Kurt Schwitters. The primary goal of Ox's work is to create an intimate correspondence between visual and musical languages. She has also worked with the composer Alvin Curran. In the catalog of Ox's 2003 Visualizing Music exhibition at the Museum of Art in Lodz, Poland, critic David S. Rubin explained the core principle of Ox's work as "...a desire to bond visual and aural information ... the impetus for the artistic journeys of Jack Ox since 1977, the year that she began basing her paintings and drawings on musical compositions. Trained in both visual art and musicology, Ox has over the past twenty-five years been developing mathematical systems for analyzing music and then 'recomposing' it in a language of her own invention."

Swiss art historian Phillipe Junod discussed Ox's work in his 1988 book, La Musique vue par les Peintres (Painters Look at Music). Junod describes the early projects in which Ox worked with the music of Bach, Stravinsky, and Debussy, before creating a cycle of paintings based on the eighth Bruckner symphony. Ox began this work in 1983, completing it eight years later in 1991. Junod emphasizes the conceptual rigor of Ox's work, developing each of Bruckner's symphonic themes. Each painting in the suite covers a sequence of ten to twenty measures. The vertical divisions of each painting correspond to Bruckner's time segments. Ox analyzed the musical structure of the symphony as the basis of artwork that would successfully translate the composer's score and sound into a visual medium. To prepare the work, Ox executed numerous drawings from the score to create a visual translation using flexible but accurate equivalences that combine figurative and formal speculation.

For Junod, Ox's methodic consistency combines formal rigor with conscious subjectivity. He states that Ox's approach represents the confluence of two distinct traditions in an original synthesis. The Saint Florian Abbey provides the thematic visual material of the paintings. This baroque architecture corresponds to the contrapuntal language that inspired Bruckner. The abbey itself was part of Bruckner's life. The painted images also include the nearby Alpine landscape, linked to the romantic nature of the composer's music. The formal correspondences in these paintings emerge from a personal system that transcribes tonal relationships through a precisely calculated analogy between the color wheel and the circle of fifths. While this process avoids a rigid correlation of color and pitch, the subtle play of color variations and values suggest each modulation by using carefully layered glazes. The effects of transparent glazing preserve the polyphonic dimension on the symphony, and the linear composition reflects rhythmic and melodic elements.

Junod's description of the process used in the Bruckner paintings mirrors the work done for other painted series before and since. These include Debussy, Nuages, Stravinsky, Symphony in Three Movements, and Clarence Barlow, Im Januar am Nil. The Barlow music was visualized in The Virtual Color Organ. The Virtual Color Organ was created with Dave Britton in 1999.

In 1993 Jack Ox discovered a recording of Kurt Schwitters himself performing the full Ursonate. A Dutch engineer apparently made the recording in the 1960s from an earlier recording once held in the archives of Westdeutsche Rundfunk. The original recording no longer exists and the precise date of the recording is unknown. Ernst Schwitters, the artist’s son, who granted permission for the recording firm Wergo to published the record, authenticated this unique recording of Schwitters. A tribunal in Cologne confirmed Schwitters’s authentication Ox has often been linked to the intermedia artists of the Fluxus group. Her work was included in the 1992 Fluxus Virus exhibition in Cologne and more recently to the Fluxus exhibition in Pori, Finland.

Recently, Barbara Maria Stafford wrote:

Two remarkable websites of the artist Jack Ox, who works in the area of visualization and metaphor, situate us solidly and robustly within Kurt Schwitters's sonorous Ursonate (1922-1932), currently being presented in full stage-sound renditions by Ox and performance artist Kristen Loree. Recalling not only Merz productions but the collaborative, intermedial aims of Fluxus and Dick Higgins's insistence on evanescent performance, the goal here, too, is creative renewal. This making of something audible and visible again has a fascinating relation to media art history. In the process of recuperation and re-enlivenment, Ox stumbled upon a long-lost recording of Schwitters performing the Ursonate. Up until then, no one knew how Schwitters actually performed the work. Ox's cross-domain work in computation, data visualization, and acoustics begins with encoding works of music that are then transformed into paintings. The largest and most important of such correlational projects is the planned full transcription of the 800-foot-long painting for the Digital Dome Theatre at the Institute of American Indian Arts in Santa Fe, New Mexico. http://intermediaprojects.org/pages/IntermediaProjectsPresentsUr.html Unlike the Modernist explorations of chance and discontinuity, fragment and fragmentation, this mode of intermedial knowing confers a revolutionary plenitude on the resulting work that is possible to experience but difficult to describe.

Originally trained in art at San Francisco Art Institute (BFA, 1969) and the University of California, San Diego (MFA, 1977) she studied musicology at the Manhattan School of Music and phonetics at the University of Cologne. In 2015, she earned her PhD at Swinburne University of Technology in Melbourne, Australia. Her thesis topic was conceptual metaphor theory and blending theory in science, design, and art.

Ox is now Creative Director of Intermedia Projects, a non-profit art-science organization located in Albuquerque, New Mexico. She is also a Research Fellow at the University of Texas, Dallas, Art-Sci Lab @ ATEC. She serves as an international co-editor of the art-science journal Leonardo from The MIT Press.
