= Kate Johnson (artist) =

American artist and filmmaker (1969–2020)

Kate Johnson (1969 – March 27, 2020) was an American artist, filmmaker, publisher, and educator. She was affiliated with EZTV, Otis College of Art & Design, and the American Film Institute.

== Career ==
From 1993 onward, she served with Michael J. Maccusi as co-director of EZTV, a cutting-edge video art space and production company, founded in Los Angeles. Leading EZTV for 27 years, she was instrumental in getting EZTV's archive inducted into the permanent collection of ONE Archives at the University of Southern California.

Johnson's cutting-edge large-scale video projection work involved both technical skill and creative vision. A pioneer in projection mapping code and programming, she created site-specific projection works in places such as the Getty Center, Los Angeles City Hall and Bergamot Station in Santa Monica. Her multi-media approach meant she was involved in all aspects of her projects, including screenwriting, editing, acting and soundtrack creation.

Her collaborative works often included an intersection of video, dance and architecture, such as 2015's EVERYWHERE in BETWEEN, which included "a black and white video of mysterious space, wrapped into geometric patterns, slowly morphed into an even more phantasmagorical space with female figures flying throughout. And then, the video stopped, and live dancers took over the stage, moving slowly in a ritual-like performance."

A skilled editor and director, her extensive dance training supported her Emmy-winning work on the documentary film Mia, a Dancer's Journey about Croatian dancer Mia Slavenska.

For over 20 years, Johnson served as an associate professor of digital media at Otis College of Art & Design and prior to that taught at the American Film Institute. Works for which Johnson was a principal collaborator have been presented at the 18th Street Arts Center, Museum of Modern Art (New York), Institute of Contemporary Arts (London), Los Angeles Zoo, Descanso Gardens, Los Angeles Center Theater, the Wire Factory (Helsinki), Japanese American Cultural & Community Center, Lincoln Center for the Performing Arts, Cannes Film Festival, Centre Pompidou and SIGGRAPH.
