= Algorithmic art =

Art genre

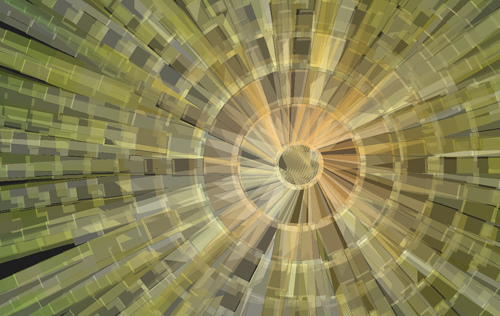
"Octopod" by Mikael Hvidtfeldt Christensen. An example of algorithmic art produced with the software Structure Synth.

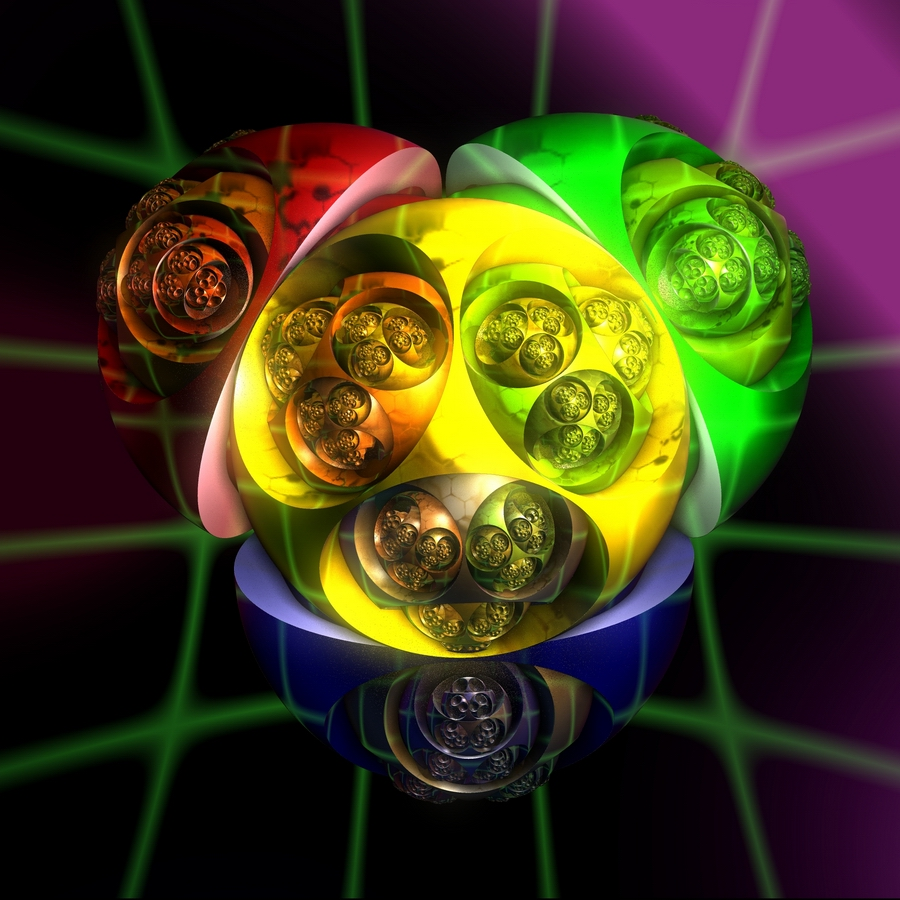
Fractal art, 2022

Algorithmic art or algorithm art is art, mostly visual art, in which the design is generated by an algorithm. Algorithmic artists are sometimes called algorists. Algorithmic art is created in the form of digital paintings and sculptures, interactive installations and music compositions.

Algorithmic art is not a new concept. Islamic art is a good example of the tradition of following a set of rules to create patterns. The even older practice of weaving includes elements of algorithmic art.

As computers developed so did the art created with them. Algorithmic art encourages experimentation allowing artists to push their creativity in the digital age. Algorithmic art allows creators to devise intricate patterns and designs that would be nearly impossible to achieve by hand. Creators have a say on what the input criteria are, but not on the outcome.

== Overview ==
Simple algorithmic art, generated using random numbers

Algorithmic art, also known as computer-generated art, is a subset of generative art (generated by an autonomous system) and is related to systems art (influenced by systems theory). Fractal art is an example of algorithmic art. Fractal art is both abstract and mesmerizing.

For an image of reasonable size, even the simplest algorithms require too much calculation for manual execution to be practical, and they are thus executed on either a single computer or on a cluster of computers. The final output is typically displayed on a computer monitor, printed with a raster-type printer, or drawn using a plotter. Variability can be introduced by using pseudo-random numbers. There is no consensus as to whether the product of an algorithm that operates on an existing image (or on any input other than pseudo-random numbers) can still be considered computer-generated art, as opposed to computer-assisted art.

== History ==
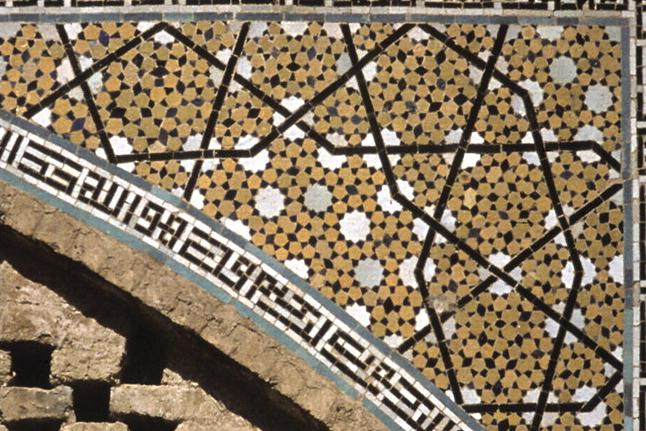
Islamic geometric patterns such as this girih tiling in the Darb-e Imam shrine in Isfahan, are precursors of algorithmic art.

Roman Verostko argues that Islamic geometric patterns are constructed using algorithms, as are Italian Renaissance paintings which make use of mathematical techniques, in particular linear perspective and proportion.

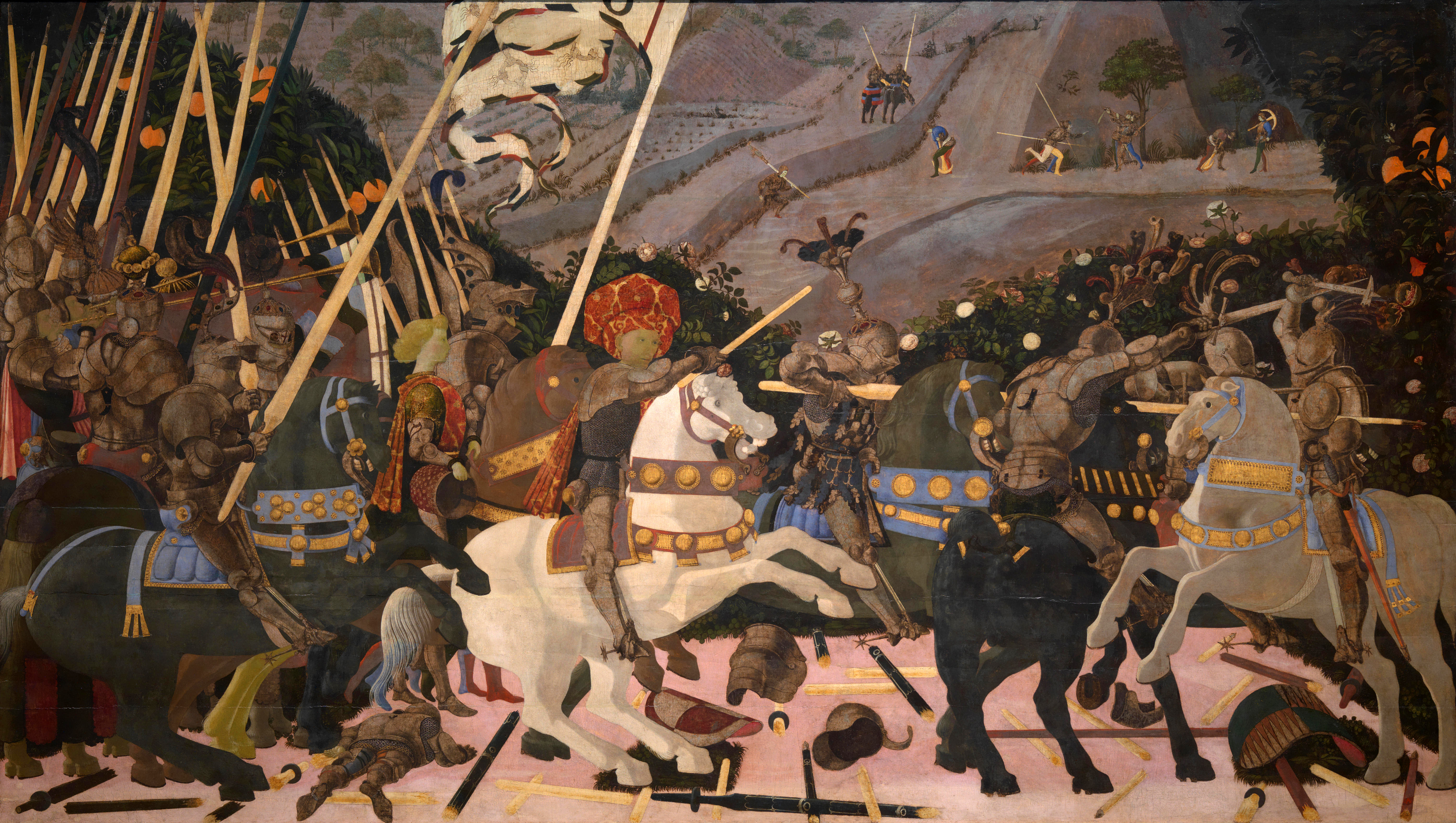
Paolo Uccello made innovative use of a geometric algorithm, incorporating linear perspective in paintings such as The Battle of San Romano (c. 1435–1460): broken lances run along perspective lines.

Some of the earliest known examples of computer-generated algorithmic art were created by Georg Nees, Frieder Nake, A. Michael Noll, Manfred Mohr and Vera Molnár in the early 1960s. These artworks were executed by a plotter controlled by a computer, and were therefore computer-generated art but not digital art. The act of creation lay in writing the program, which specified the sequence of actions to be performed by the plotter. Sonia Landy Sheridan established Generative Systems as a program at the School of the Art Institute of Chicago in 1970 in response to social change brought about in part by the computer-robot communications revolution. Her early work with copier and telematic art focused on the differences between the human hand and the algorithm.

Aside from the ongoing work of Roman Verostko and his fellow algorists, the next known examples are fractal artworks created in the mid to late 1980s. These are important here because they use a different means of execution. Whereas the earliest algorithmic art was "drawn" by a plotter, fractal art simply creates an image in computer memory; it is therefore digital art. The native form of a fractal artwork is an image stored on a computer –this is also true of very nearly all equation art and of most recent algorithmic art in general. However, in a stricter sense "fractal art" is not considered algorithmic art, because the algorithm is not devised by the artist.

In light of such ongoing developments, pioneer algorithmic artist Ernest Edmonds has documented the continuing prophetic role of art in human affairs by tracing the early 1960s association between art and the computer up to a present time in which the algorithm is now widely recognized as a key concept for society as a whole.

=== Rational approaches to art ===
While art has strong emotional and psychological ties, it also depends heavily on rational approaches. Artists have to learn how to use various tools, theories and techniques to be able to create impressive artwork. Thus, throughout history, many art techniques were introduced to create various visual effects. For example, Georges-Pierre Seurat invented pointillism, a painting technique that involves placing dots of complementary colors adjacent to each other. Cubism and Color Theory also helped revolutionize visual arts. Cubism involved taking various reference points for the object and creating a 2-Dimensional rendering. Color Theory, stating that all colors are a combination of the three primary colors (Red, Green and Blue), also helped facilitate the use of colors in visual arts and in the creation of distinct colorful effects. In other words, humans have always found algorithmic ways and discovered patterns to create art. Such tools allowed humans to create more visually appealing artworks efficiently. In such ways, art adapted to become more methodological.

=== Creating perspective through algorithms ===
Another important aspect that allowed art to evolve into its current form is perspective. Perspective allows the artist to create a 2-Dimensional projection of a 3-Dimensional object. Muslim artists during the Islamic Golden Age employed linear perspective in most of their designs. The notion of perspective was rediscovered by Italian artists during the Renaissance. The Golden Ratio, a famous mathematical ratio, was utilized by many Renaissance artists in their drawings. Most famously, Leonardo DaVinci employed that technique in his Mona Lisa, and many other paintings, such as Salvator Mundi. This is a form of using algorithms in art. By examining the works of artists in the past, from the Renaissance and Islamic Golden Age, a pattern of mathematical patterns, geometric principles and natural numbers emerges.

== Role of the algorithm ==
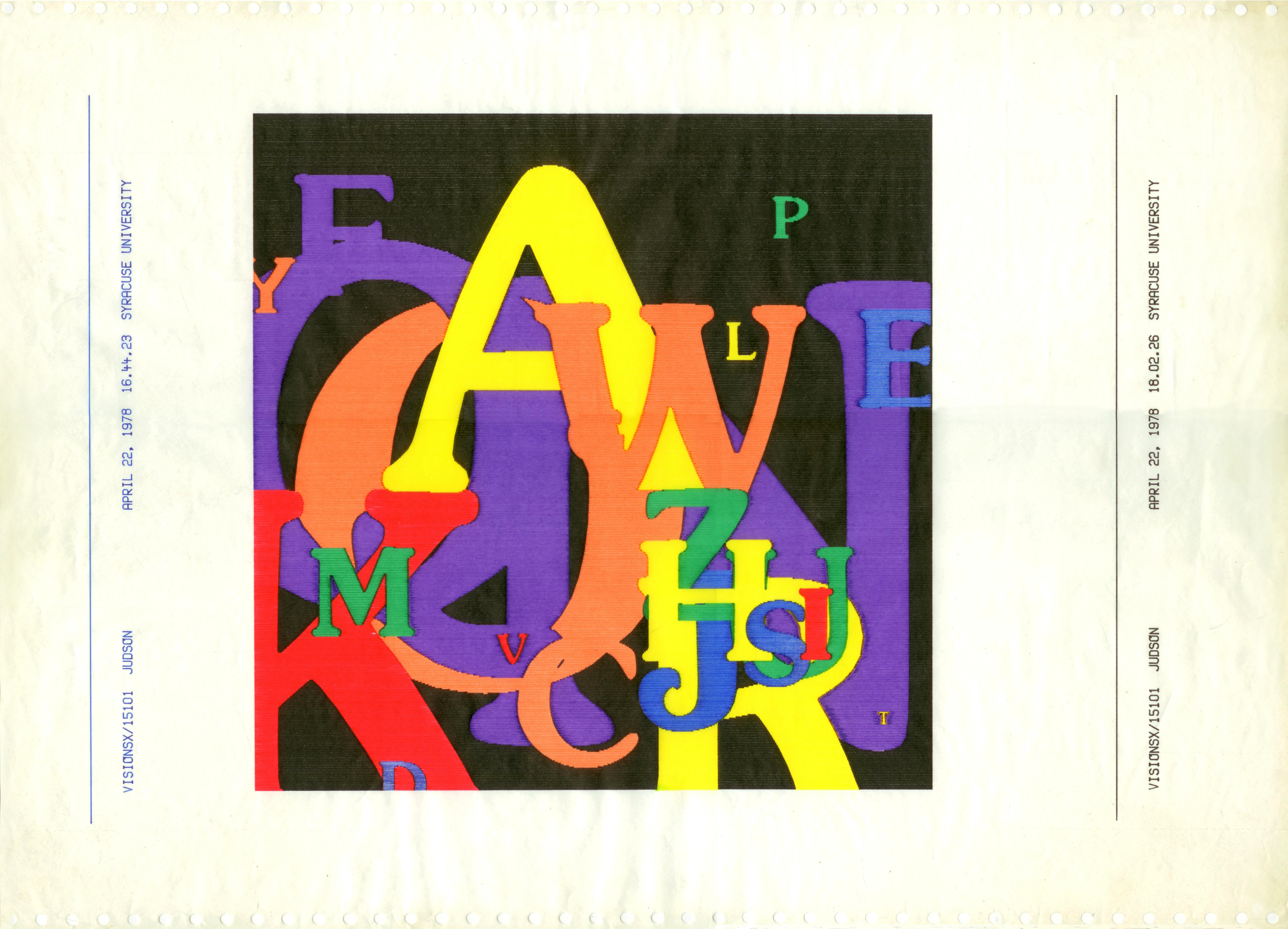
Letter Field by Judson Rosebush, 1978. Calcomp plotter computer output with liquid inks on rag paper, 15.25 x 21 inches. This image was created using an early version of what became Digital Effects' Vision software, in APL and Fortran on an IBM 370/158. A database of the Souvenir font; random number generation, a statistical basis to determine letter size, color, and position; and a hidden line algorithm combine to produce this scan line raster image, output to a plotter.

From one point of view, for a work of art to be considered algorithmic art, its creation must include a process based on an algorithm devised by the artist. An artist may also select parameters and interact as the composition is generated. Here, an algorithm is simply a detailed recipe for the design and possibly execution of an artwork, which may include computer code, functions, expressions, or other input which ultimately determines the form the art will take. This input may be mathematical, computational, or generative in nature. Inasmuch as algorithms tend to be deterministic, meaning that their repeated execution would always result in the production of identical artworks, some external factor is usually introduced. This can either be a random number generator of some sort, or an external body of data (which can range from recorded heartbeats to frames of a movie.) Some artists also work with organically based gestural input which is then modified by an algorithm. By this definition, fractals made by a fractal program are not art, as humans are not involved. However, defined differently, algorithmic art can be seen to include fractal art, as well as other varieties such as those using genetic algorithms. The artist Kerry Mitchell stated in his 1999 Fractal Art Manifesto:

Fractal Art is not..Computer(ized) Art, in the sense that the computer does all the work. The work is executed on a computer, but only at the direction of the artist. Turn a computer on and leave it alone for an hour. When you come back, no art will have been generated.

== Algorists ==
"Algorist" is a term used for digital artists who create algorithmic art. Pioneering algorists include Vera Molnár, Dóra Maurer and Gizella Rákóczy.

Algorists formally began correspondence and establishing their identity as artists following a panel titled "Art and Algorithms" at SIGGRAPH in 1995. The co-founders were Jean-Pierre Hébert and Roman Verostko. Hébert is credited with coining the term and its definition, which is in the form of his own algorithm:

if (creation && object of art && algorithm && one's own algorithm) {
     return * an algorist *
} else {
     return * not an algorist *
}

=== Types ===
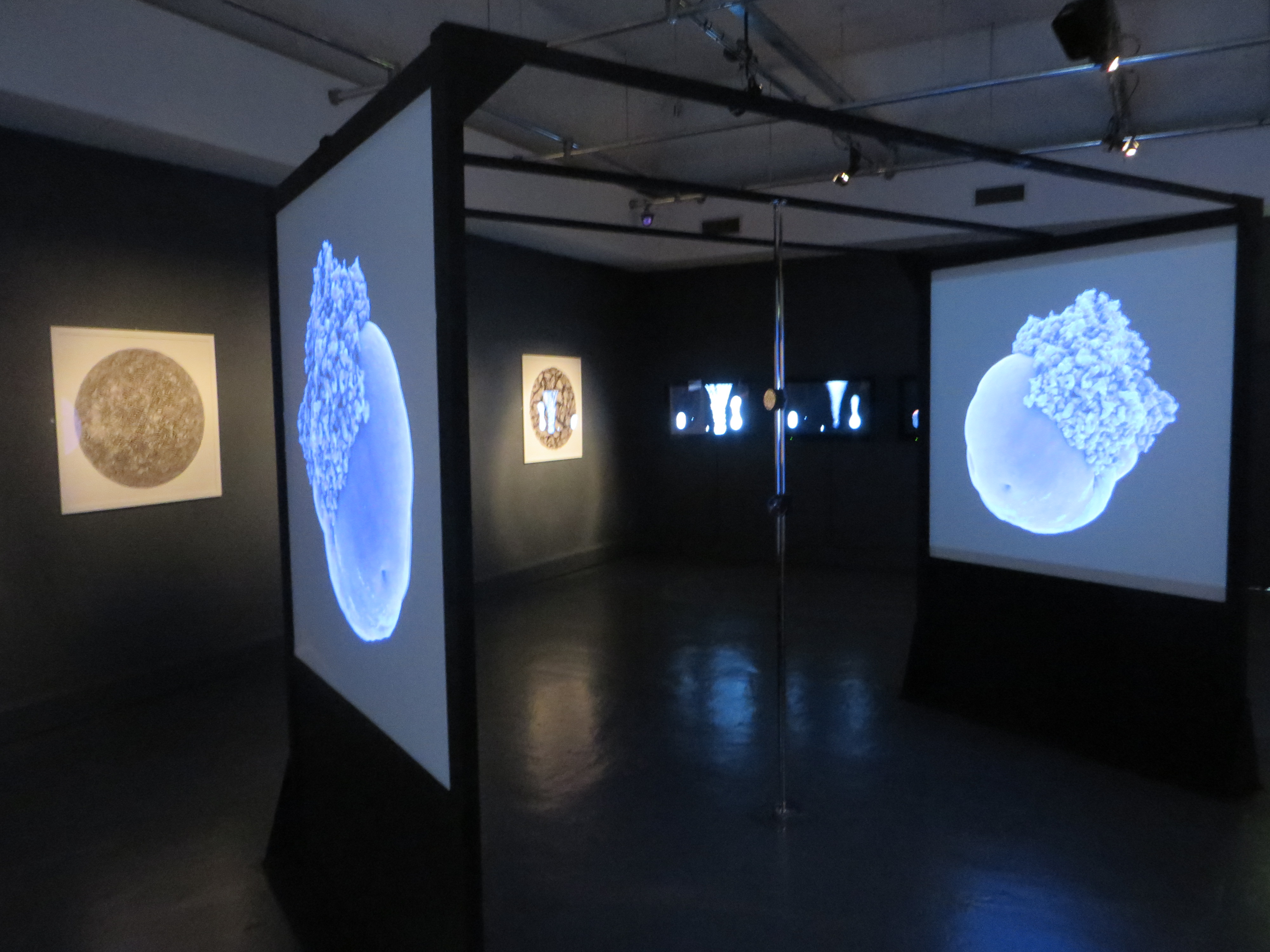
Morphogenetic Creations, a computer-generated digital art exhibition using programmed algorithms by Andy Lomas, at the Watermans Arts Centre, west London, 2016

Artists can write code that creates complex and dynamic visual compositions.

Cellular automata can be used to generate artistic patterns with an appearance of randomness, or to modify images such as photographs by applying a transformation such as the stepping stone rule (to give an impressionist style) repeatedly until the desired artistic effect is achieved. Their use has also been explored in music.

Fractal art consists of varieties of computer-generated fractals with colouring chosen to give an attractive effect. Especially in the western world, it is not drawn or painted by hand. It is usually created indirectly with the assistance of fractal-generating software, iterating through three phases: setting parameters of appropriate fractal software; executing the possibly lengthy calculation; and evaluating the product. In some cases, other graphics programs are used to further modify the images produced. This is called post-processing. Non-fractal imagery may also be integrated into the artwork.

Genetic or evolutionary art makes use of genetic algorithms to develop images iteratively, selecting at each "generation" according to a rule defined by the artist.

Algorithmic art is not only produced by computers. Wendy Chun explains:

Software is unique in its status as metaphor for metaphor itself. As A universal imitator/machine, it encapsulates a logic of general substitutability; a logic of ordering and creative, animating disordering. Joseph Weizenbaum has argued that computers have become metaphors for "effective procedures," that is, for anything that can be solved in a prescribed number of steps, such as gene expression and clerical work.

The American artist, Jack Ox, has used algorithms to produce paintings that are visualizations of music without using a computer. Two examples are visual performances of extant scores, such as Anton Bruckner's Eighth Symphony and Kurt Schwitters' Ursonate. Later, she and her collaborator, Dave Britton, created the 21st Century Virtual Color Organ that does use computer coding and algorithms.

Since 1996 there have been ambigram generators that auto generate ambigrams.

== See also ==
- AI art
- Algorithmic composition
- Computer-aided design
- DeepDream
- Demoscene
- Display hack
- Low-complexity art
- Infinite compositions of analytic functions
