= Mark Wilson (cricketer) =

Scottish cricketer

Personal information
- Born: 25 November 1890; Whitburn, County Durham, England
- Died: 3 August 1982 (aged 91); Sauchie, Clackmannanshire, Scotland
- Batting: Left-handed
- Bowling: Left-arm fast-medium

Domestic team information
- Years: Team
- 1925: Scotland

Career statistics
Competition	First-class
Matches	1
Runs scored	4
Batting average	2.00
100s/50s	–/–
Top score	4
Balls bowled	48
Wickets	0
Bowling average	–
5 wickets in innings	–
10 wickets in match	–
Best bowling	–
Catches/stumpings	–/–
- Source: Cricinfo, 2 November 2022

Mark Wilson (25 November 1890 – 3 August 1982) was an English-born Scottish first-class cricketer.

Wilson was born in November 1890 in Whitburn, County Durham. He was a club cricketer for Clackmannan County/ His club career was somewhat eventful, with him making an allegation to the police that he had been assaulted by a spectator during a match in 1924. He made a single appearance in first-class cricket for Scotland against Lancashire at Old Trafford on Scotland's 1925 tour of England. Batting twice in the match, he was dismissed without scoring by Dick Tyldesley, while in their second innings he was dismissed for 4 runs by Len Hopwood. With his left-arm fast-medium bowling, he bowled eight wicketless overs. Outside of cricket, Wilson played football for Sauchie Juniors F.C., signing for the club in August 1922. Away from sports, he was by profession a foreman at a woollen mill. Wilson died in August 1982 at Sauchie, Clackmannanshire.
