= Mark Wilson (artist) =

American artist

- Born: May 13, 1943; Cottage Grove, Oregon
- Education: Pomona College, Yale
- Known for: Art
- Movement: Digital, Algorithmic Art
- Awards: NEA, 1982; Connecticut Commission on the Arts;

Mark Wilson (Artist) (born May 13, 1943 in Cottage Grove, Oregon) is an American digital artist, a painter, and printmaker.

He received a National Endowment for the Arts fellowship in 1982, Prix Ars Electronica (Distinction, Computer Graphics) in 1992, and 3 Connecticut Commission on the Arts grants. He has taught, lectured and been visiting artist at University of California at Santa Barbara, Yale, Carnegie-Mellon, and the School of Visual Arts.

== Public collections ==
His work is held by the Mary and Leigh Block Museum of Art, the Museum der Stadt Gladbeck at Wittringen Castle, Portland Art Museum, Victoria and Albert Museum, Virginia Museum of Fine Arts and other institutions.

== Sources ==
- "A Portfolio." Perspectives in Computing. Vol. 5, No.2, (Summer, 1985), p. 39-40.
- "Artist's Easel is His Computer Screen." Los Angeles Times, (December 15, 1983), Part I-B, p. 10.
- Beddard, Honor and Dodds, Douglas. Digital Pioneers. London: V&A Publishing, 2009.
- Brand, Frederick and Massie, Rebecca. The Lewis Collection. Richmond: The Virginia Museum, 1978.
- "Computer Art for Art's Sake." PC Magazine, (April, 1983), p. 73-85.
- "Computer as Palette." The Christian Science Monitor, (August 7, 1985), p. 23.
- "Computer Technology Replaces the Brush of the Artist." The New York Times, (October 13, 1985).
- Dodds, Douglas. Mark Wilson: Code Matrix 1985-2012. Cologne: Galerie DAM, 2012.
- Farthing, S. ed. Art:From Cave Painting to Street Art. New York: Universe, 2010.
- Galloway, David. Artware. Düsseldorf: Econ Verlag, 1987.
- Goodman, Cynthia. Digital Visions. New York: Harry Abrams, 1987.
- Klanten, R. ed. Data Flow 2. Berlin: Gestalten, 2010.
- Lieser, Wolf. Digital Art. Konigswinter: H.F. Ullmann, 2009.
- Lieser, Wolf. The World of Digital Art. Konigswinter: H.F. Ullmann, 2010.
- Lovejoy, Margot. Postmodern Currents. Ann Arbor: UMI Research Press, 1989.
- Reas, Casey and McWilliams, Chandler. Form+Code. New York: Princeton Architectural Press, 2010.
- Walker, James Faure. Painting the Digital River. New York: Prentice Hall, 2006.
- Wands, Bruce. Art of the Digital Age. London: Thames & Hudson, 2006.
- Royal College of Art. Control Print. London: Royal College of Art, 2007.
- Wood, Deborah. Imaging by Numbers. Evanston:Block Museum of Art, 2008.
