= Pollock-Krasner House and Study Center =

Historic house in New York, United States

- Pollock-Krasner House and Studio
- U.S. National Register of Historic Places
- U.S. National Historic Landmark
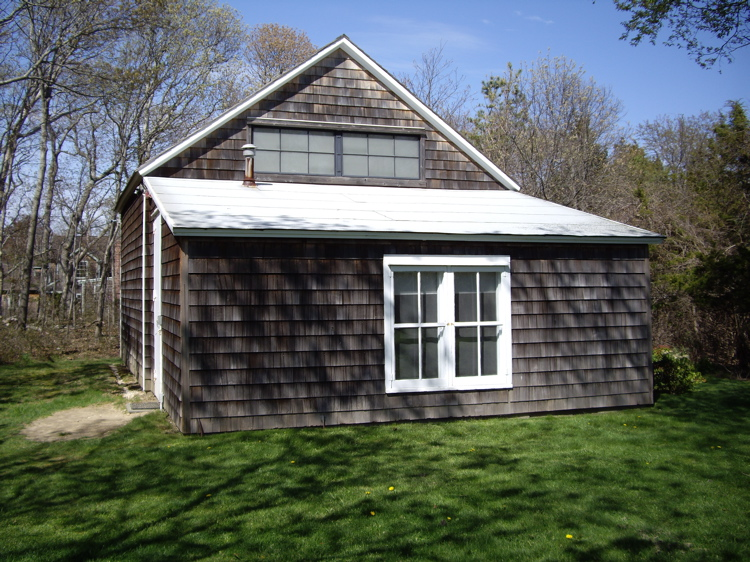
- Jackson Pollock's Studio Barn

- Location within New York Location within the United States
- Location: 830 Fireplace Rd., East Hampton, New York
- Coordinates: 41°1′25″N 72°9′19″W
- Area: 1.6 acres (0.65 ha)
- Built: 1879
- NRHP reference No.: 94001193

Significant dates
- Added to NRHP: April 19, 1994
- Designated NHL: April 19, 1994

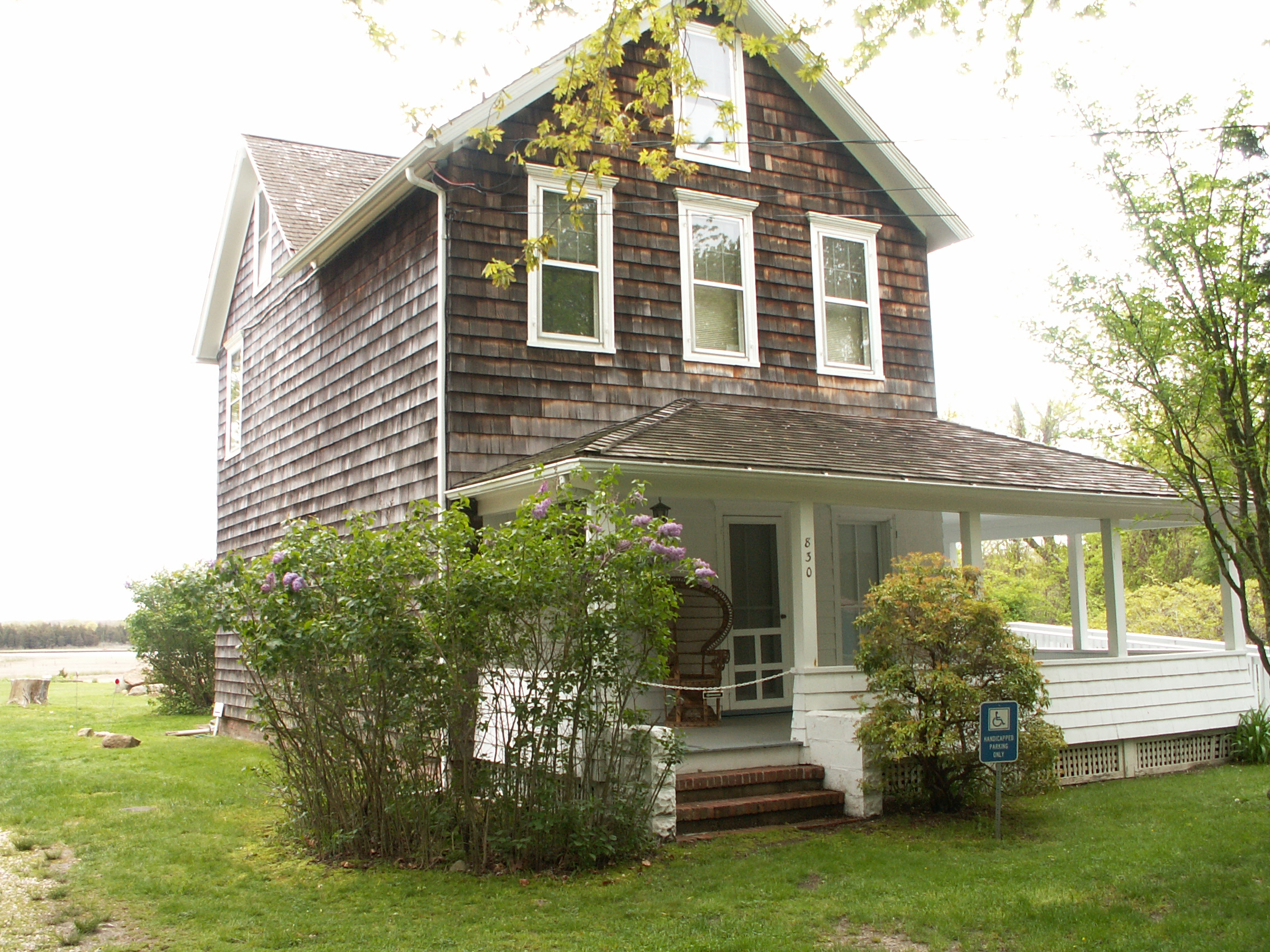
Pollock-Krasner house in Springs, NY.

The Pollock-Krasner House and Studio is located in Springs in the town of East Hampton on Long Island, New York, United States. It was occupied by husband-and-wife painters Jackson Pollock and Lee Krasner from November 1945 to their respective deaths in 1956 and 1984. The wood-frame house occupies 1.56 acres (0.63 ha) on Accobonac Creek, with a nearby barn.

== History ==
Pollock and Krasner had visited friends nearby when they found this house for sale in 1945. The price was $5,000 and Peggy Guggenheim loaned them the $2,000 down payment in exchange for artwork.

At first Pollock used an upstairs bedroom as a studio. In 1946, after moving the barn to improve the view from the house, Pollock started using that building as his studio. Krasner began using the bedroom as her studio. Pollock's brother had given him a large collection of square Masonite baseball game boards, and in 1953, Pollock used them to cover the floor of the house and studio. After Pollock's death in 1956, Krasner started using the barn as her studio.

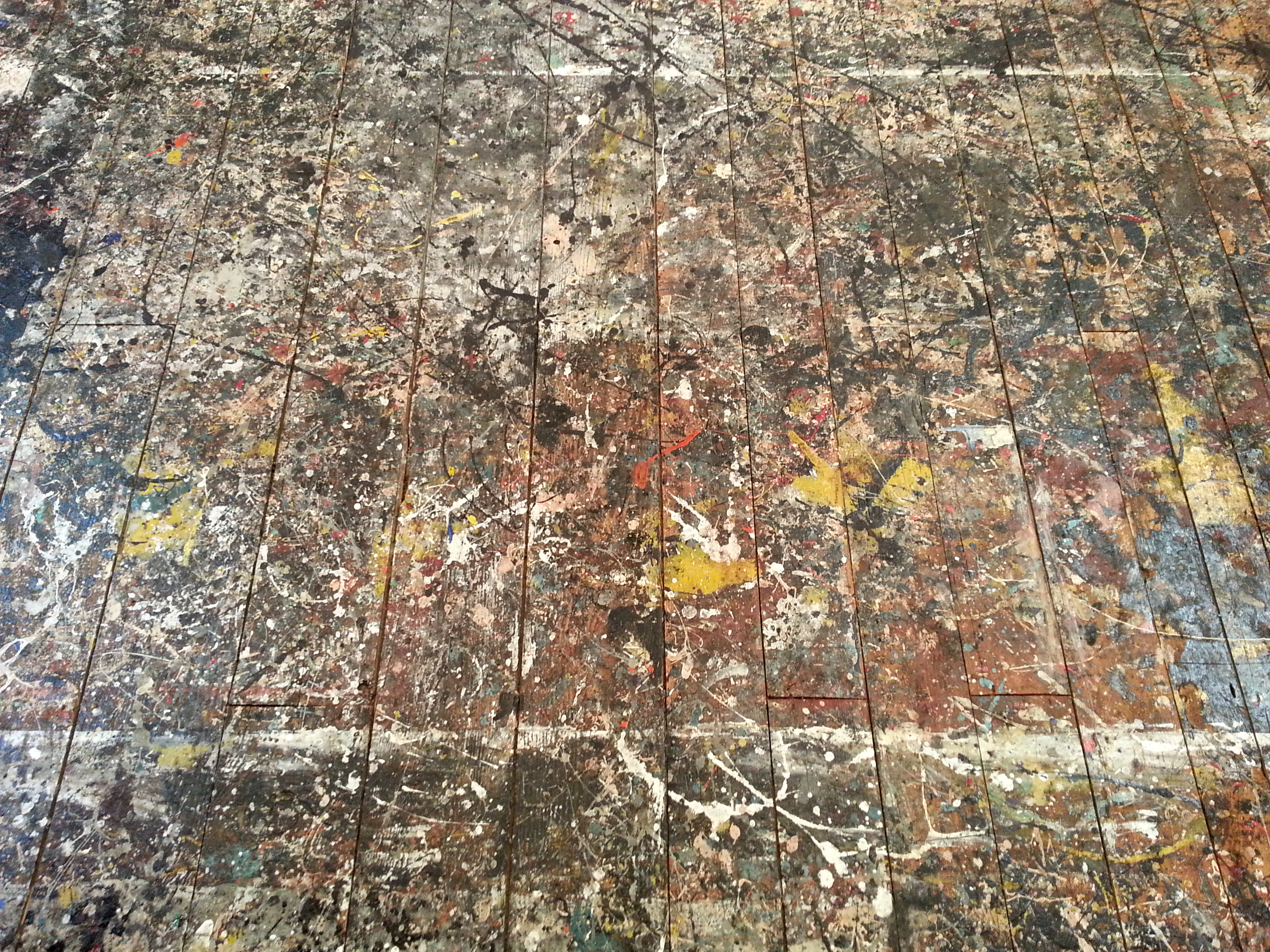
Barn studio floor

After Krasner died in 1984, the property was given to the Stony Brook Foundation which is administered by Stony Brook University. Conservators examined the house and studio. Underneath the Masonite squares, they discovered the original barn floor, covered in stray paint. The foundation schedules tours of the studio and house from May through October.

Part of the property was donated by Krasner to The Nature Conservancy in the 1970s. The surrounding Springs neighborhood is on the National Register of Historic Places. The house and studio was declared a National Historic Landmark in 1994.

== In popular culture ==
The house and studio were used in the making of the biopic Pollock (2000), starring and directed by Ed Harris. In addition, the studio was featured in Episode 2 of the BBC series The Code in 2011.
