= Anne Morgan Spalter =

American artist (born 1965)

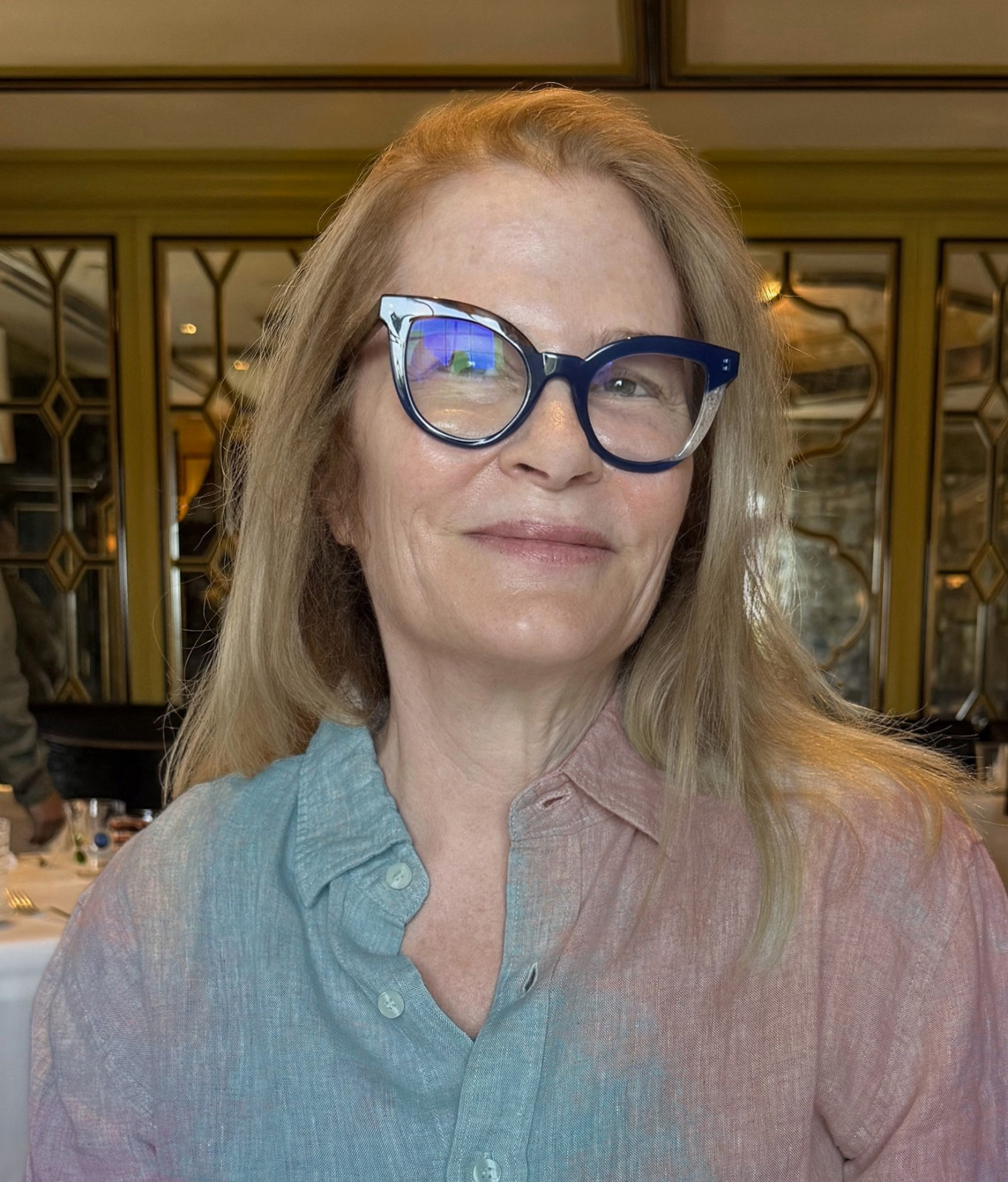
- Born: April 16, 1965 (age 61)
- Education: Brown University
- Alma mater: Rhode Island School of Design
- Known for: Author of "The Computer in the Visual Arts"
- Website: http://annespalter.com

Anne Morgan Spalter (born April 16, 1965) is an American new media artist working from Anne Spalter Studios in Providence, Rhode Island; Williamsburg, Brooklyn; and Brattleboro, Vermont. Having founded and taught Brown University's and RISD's original digital fine arts courses in the 1990s, Spalter is the author of the widely used text The Computer in the Visual Arts (Addison-Wesley 1999). Her art, writing, and teaching all reflect her long-standing goal of integrating art and technology.

Spalter's digital mixed media artwork is included in leading contemporary collections in the US, Europe and the Middle East as well as in museums such as the Buffalo AKG Art Museum (Buffalo, NY), The Centre Pompidou (Paris France), and the Victoria & Albert Museum (London, UK).

== Life and work ==
Spalter first used a computer to create artwork as an undergraduate at Brown University, Providence, Rhode Island, in the late 1980s. Recognizing its unique power to integrate different disciplines, Spalter created an independent major that culminated in a multimedia novel. She also graduated with a B.A. in Mathematics and in Visual Art. After three years in New York, Spalter returned to Rhode Island to pursue an MFA at the Rhode Island School of Design (RISD).

Spalter initiated and taught the first new media fine arts courses at both RISD and Brown. Finding a lack of teaching aids she wrote the textbook, “The Computer in the Visual Arts.” James Faure Walker, artist, author and founder of the British magazine ArtScribe, describes the book, on its jacket, as: “...the first comprehensive work to combine technical and theoretical aspects of the emerging field of computer art and design.” Alvy Ray Smith was an advisor. Reviews in MIT's Technology Review and other publications provide further details.

“The Computer in the Visual Arts” has been used in courses at schools from the University of Washington to Bowling Green State University to Pratt Institute as well as Institutions outside the US such as King's College London. and Sabancı University, Istanbul. It is on the Victoria and Albert "Computer Art Reading list."

As an educator and artist in this emerging field, Spalter has served on editorial boards of publications such as CG Educational Materials Source (CGEMS), and has given many invited lectures, including in the inaugural series for the Harvard Initiative in Innovative Computing.

In Brown University’s Department of Computer Science, Spalter worked with Thomas J. Watson Jr. University Professor of Technology and Education and Professor of Computer Science Andries van Dam as Artist in Residence and as a Visual Computing Researcher. She has initiated and published on research projects ranging from color theory and its applications to better color selection tools to a large-scale educational effort to raise visual literacy to the same status as reading and writing in core curricula. In 2008, Spalter left her position at Brown to create art full-time.

Spalter’s art works explore the concept of the “modern landscape” through both the subject matter and the processes used to create the work. She draws on her own travels and digital photographic and video database to create both traditional works and new media still and moving pieces. She is particularly interested in combining traditional strategies with computational processes.

== Artwork ==
She has had recent solo shows at Bang&Olfusen (curated by Jessica Marinaro, with musical collaborator The Josh Craig) (2025), Satellite Art Show Gallery (2024), and the Expanded Art Gallery in Berlin (2023). Her AI-assisted animated works have been auctioned at Sotheby’s (Diamond Spaceshsip 2025, The Wonder of it All 2021) and Phillips ( Deconstructed Dream Space 2022)

She is also known for large-scale art fair and public installations such as those through MTAArts at Fulton Center NYC, at Spring Break Art Show and Miami Marbles during Miami Art Week, as well as 25 Kent Ave Brooklyn with both her tropical immersive creation and interactive video works

== Style and views ==
Throughout her career, Spalter has worked with a variety of digital tools and processes, including early rendering software, algorithmic animation, and, more recently, blockchain-based platforms and artificial intelligence. Her work often examines modern and technological landscapes, combining natural and man-made elements in compositions that evoke what she has described as a “Happy Apocalypse.” Despite changes in medium, the thematic content of her work has remained consistent, centered on the aesthetics and psychological dimensions of contemporary environments.

== Personal life ==
Michael Spalter, Chair of the Board of the Rhode Island School of Design, shares a passion for new media art and was the author of the new media blog Spalter Digital Art Collection. In the 1990s, the two began collecting early art works in the field. They now arguably have the world’s largest private collection of early works in this genre and have lent pieces to the MoMA in New York and LACMA as well as museums internationally. A show curated from the Anne and Michael Spalter collection was held in 2011 at the deCordova Museum in Lincoln, MA.
