= Georg Nees =

German computer scientist and artist (1926–2016)

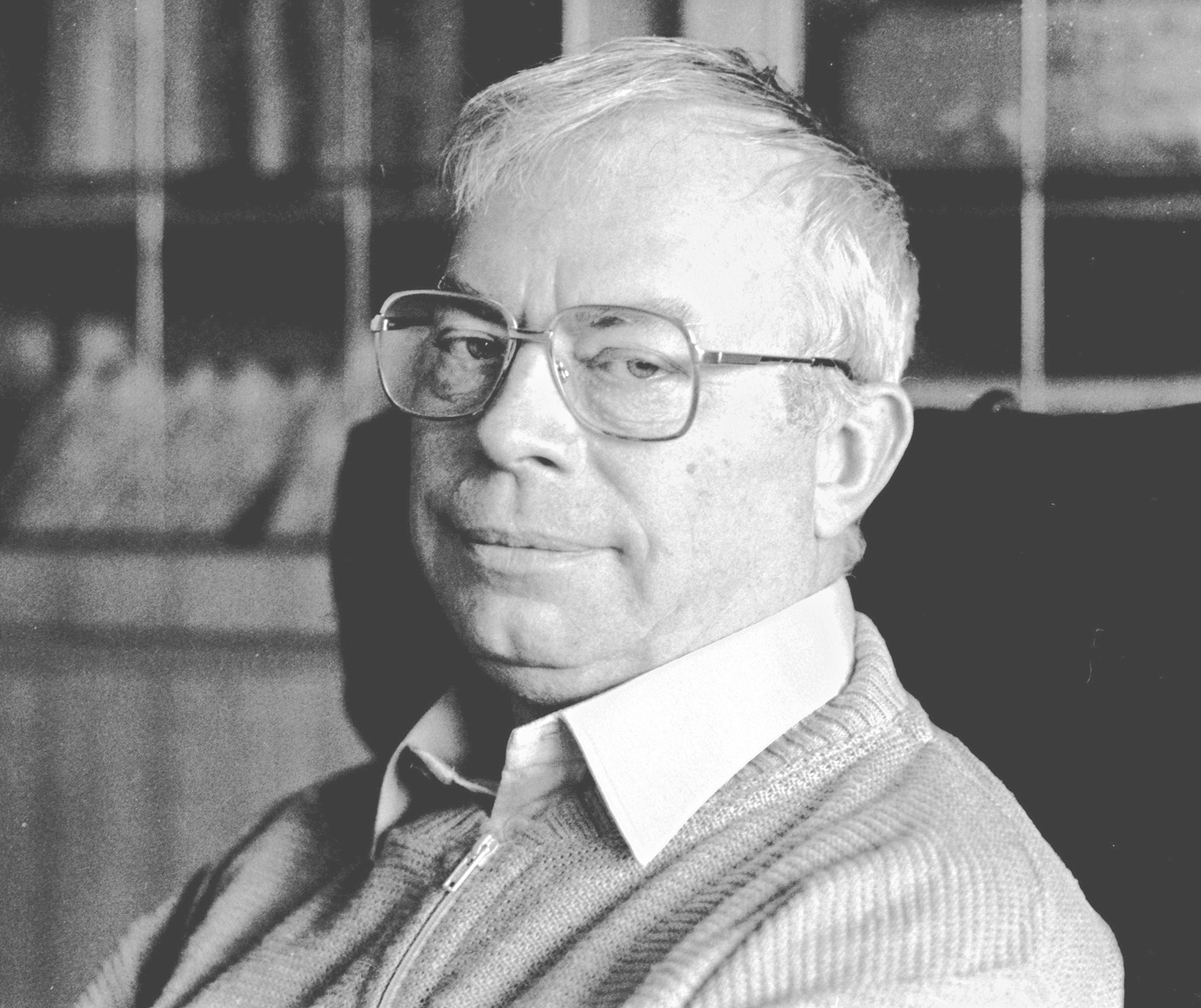
- Georg Nees, 1986, photo Alex Kempkens
- Born: 23 June 1926
- Died: 3 January 2016 (aged 89)
- Education: University of Stuttgart
- Occupations: Mathematician; computer scientist; graphic artist; painter; photographer
- Scientific career
- Thesis: Generative computer graphics
- Doctoral advisor: Max Bense

Georg Nees (23 June 1926 – 3 January 2016) was a German academic who was a pioneer of computer art and generative graphics. He studied mathematics, physics and philosophy in Erlangen and Stuttgart and was scientific advisor at the SEMIOSIS, International Journal of semiotics and aesthetics. In 1977, he was appointed Honorary Professor of Applied computer science at the University of Erlangen Nees is one of the "3N" computer pioneers, an abbreviation that has become acknowledged for Frieder Nake, Georg Nees and A. Michael Noll, whose computer graphics were created with digital computers.

== Early life and studies ==
Georg Nees was born in 1926 in Nuremberg, where he spent his childhood. He showed scientific curiosity and interest in art from a young age and among his favorite pastimes were viewing art postcards and looking through a microscope. He attended a school in Schwabach near Nuremberg, graduating in 1945. From 1945 to 1951, he studied mathematics and physics at the University of Erlangen then worked as an industry mathematician for the Siemens Schuckertwerk in Erlangen from 1951 to 1985. There he started to write his first programs in 1959. The company was later incorporated into the Siemens AG.

From 1964 onwards, he studied philosophy at the Technische Hochschule Stuttgart (since 1967 the University of Stuttgart), under Max Bense. He received his doctorate with his thesis on Generative Computergraphik under Max Bense in 1969. His work is considered one of the first theses on Generative Computer Graphics. In 1969, his thesis was published as a book entitled "Generative Computergraphik" and also included examples of program code and graphics produced thereby. After his retirement in 1985 Nees worked as an author and in the field of computer art.

== Computer art ==
In February 1965, Nees showed - as works of art - the world's first computer graphics created with a digital computer, the newly introduced Zuse Graphomat Z64 plotter. The exhibition, titled computer graphik took place at the public premises of the "Study Gallery of Stuttgart College". In 1966, he started to work on "computer-sculptures". In the catalog of the Biennale 1969 Nuremberg, Nees describes how the computer program controlled the milling machine so that instead of a workpiece, a sculpture was created. Three painted wooden sculptures and several graphics were shown at the Biennale 1969 Nuremberg. In 1970 at the 35th Venice Biennale his work was part of the special exhibition "Research and Design. Proposals for an experimental exposure" and showcased his sculptures and graphics of art and architectural design.

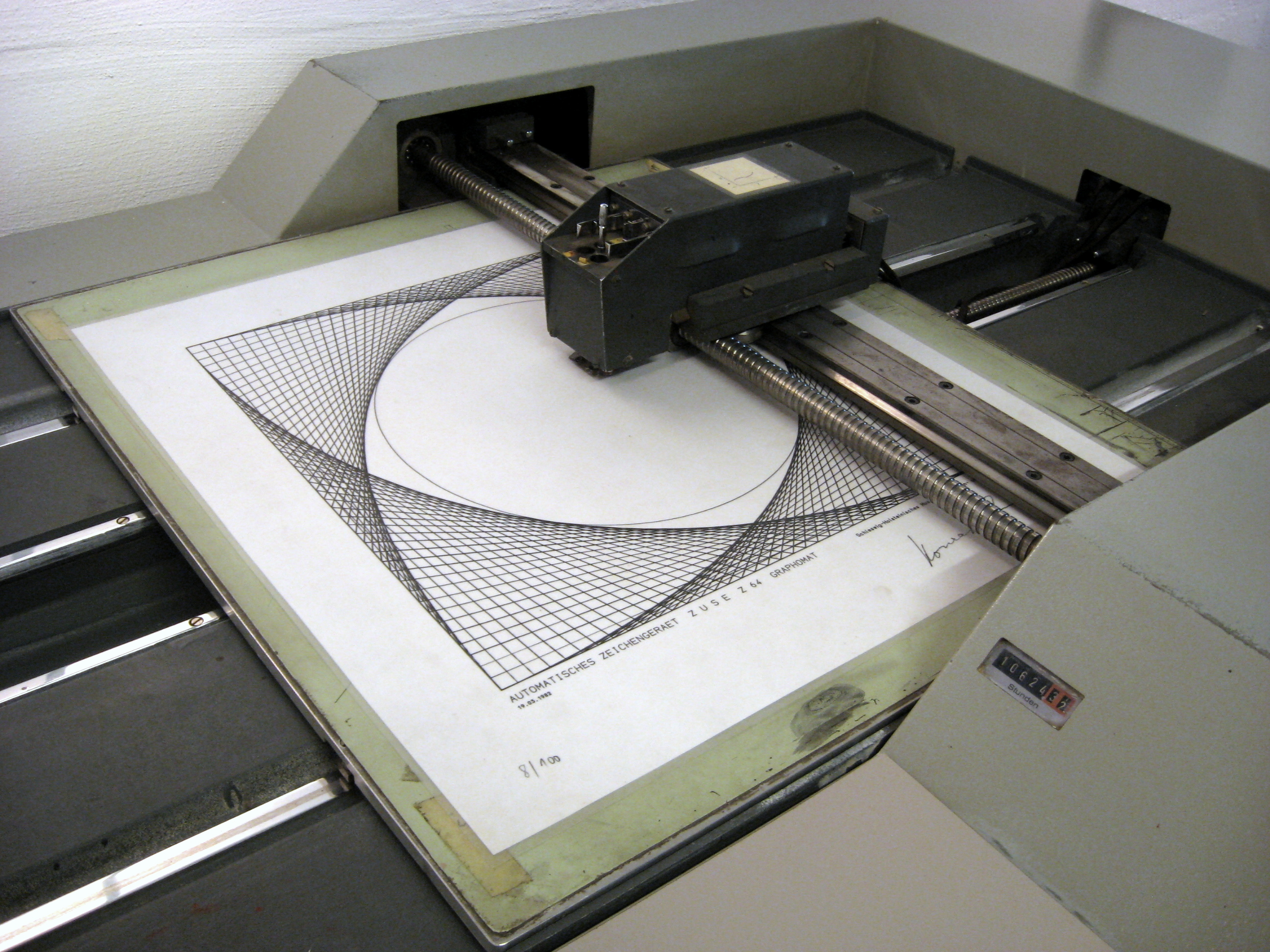
Flatbed drawing machine ZUSE Z64, photograph by Tomasz Sienicki (one work)

In 1963, Nees was instrumental in the purchase of a flatbed plotter, the Zuse Graphomat Z64 designed by Konrad Zuse, for the data center at the Schuckertwerke in Erlangen. At the exhibition Georg Nees – The Great Temptation at the ZKM Nees said: "There it was, the great temptation for me, for once not to represent something technical with this machine but rather something 'useless' – geometrical patterns."

Using the ALGOL language, Nees created drawings and graphics for production, art and architectural drawings. He wrote the new graphics libraries G1, G2 and G3 with ALGOL, for controlling the Z64 and random number generation. In 1965 Nees experimented with random numbers and circle arcs (Kreisbögen). The graphic Kreisbogengewirre (Arc confusion) was a graphic of this series, also known as Locken. Frieder Nake explains how this graphic was created: "In fact, the picture does consist of one continuous path of arcs. … The length and radius of the individual arcs are randomly chosen within the limits defined by the programmer … The picture in it present form is due to a fairly serious programming error … It was designed to be less complex and it had to be ended manually because of the error."

Nees worked with the Siemens System 2002 to create aesthetic graphics, such as the graphic "gravel" (Schotter) in 1968. This artwork is well known and can be seen on the website of the Victoria and Albert Museum, London. When writing the program Nees introduced commands for random numbers, which produced from a designated point on the resulting chaos. This causes the graphic to develop from order to disorder or vice versa, if the graphic is turned through 180 degrees (upside down).

Robert J. Krawczyk wrote in his text A Shattered Perfection: Crafting a Virtual Sculpture: "Georg Nees's Gravel Stones … What attracted me to this piece was the simplicity of the concept and the overall interpretation of transforming order into disorder. … What intrigues me with this "ancient" piece was the use of exact mathematical computations to model a chaotic image and the progression from the ordered to the disordered."

=== Computer designed architecture ===
The first computer graphic produced in architecture by Nees was the motive corridor (Flur) in 1968. In 1968 Nees started his collaboration with the architect Ludwig Rase for the Siemens Pavilion at the Hannover Industrial Fair in 1970. The drawings of the truss roof was first calculated with the System 2002 and drawn with the Graphomat Z64. For the Hannover fair in 1970 the drawings were created with the modern System 4004 again. One of the drawings was printed as a poster for the Hannover Fair and for the 35th Venice Biennale in 1970. There were also computer drawings for fair pavilions of the Siemens AG, such as the "German Industry Exhibition" in São Paulo in 1971.

Ludwig Rase experimented based on the cuboctahedron for residential dwellings and urban design with Nees creating the computer aided design plans for the project. The graphic Kubo-Octaeder developed during this was used for the cover and poster of the exhibition Computer art. nees rase in the Hamburger Kunsthalle in 1972.

=== From 1985 on ===
Nees retired in 1985 and started his research and experiments again. He devoted his time solely to semiotics and aesthetics for media and design. He published the results from 1995 onwards in several books and articles.

In 1985, Alex Kempkens asked Nees whether he wished to participate in the exhibition Bilder Images Digital in the ″Gallery of the Artist″ in Munich, which was planned for October 1986. He said yes and created a new series of computer graphics. These graphics have a special position within the oeuvre by Nees. To generate the graphics he gave the AI engine simple, philosophical as well as mythical commands. Based on the commands, the computer produced different graphics. He wrote the programs in the Lisp language and a System 7000 calculated the graphics. Nees wrote in the exhibition catalog:

My own computer graphics in the spring of 1986, I understand as studies on ambience, as they could be synthesized by perhaps a future Reagiblen machines. An essential part task in the design of such machines is thinking out sample dialogues, which one would like to perform with the finished instrument. The following dialog could then be feasible: "Show me a sphere." The automaton would respond with the production of the image "sphere north-west-nadir." The dialog would continue with "Add on the context, myth; visualize the contrast between law and coincidence."; The response would be the image, "Apollo and Dionysius".

The art critic Eva Karcher wrote in the interpretation of his graphics:

The automaton as creativity stimulant? A mental concept which one can only consider cautiously and which however can call in question all the hitherto binding definitions of the inviolability of the human creative capacity. Looking at the multi-patterned constructions in Nees' graphics, with their floating ellipsoids, crystalloid spheres and bizarre forms, one cannot help but acknowledge and appreciate their atmospheric and inspiration-inducing effects.

Nees died on 3 January 2016 at the age of 89.

== Work ==
Apoll und Dionysos.

=== Books ===
- computer grafik, edition rot 19, Max Bense und Elisabeth Walther, Stuttgart, 1965.
- Generative Computergraphik, Siemens AG, Berlin, München, 1969.
- Formel, Farbe, Form: Computerästhetik für Medien und Design, Springer, Berlin, 1995.
- Grenzzeichen. Bilder und Gedanken zu einer constraint-orientierten Ästhetik, Deutscher Wissenschaftsverlag, Baden-Baden, 2010.
- Die Gassenhauer-Ontologie. Ein philosophischer Zukunftsroman, Deutscher Wissenschaftsverlag, Baden-Baden, 2014.

=== Texts ===
- Georg Nees: ″Statistische Graphik″, in: Grundlagenstudien aus Kybernetik und Geisteswissenschaft, vol. 5, no. 3/4, December 1964, Pages 67–78.
- Georg Nees: ″computer-grafik″, in: rot 19, edition rot . Stuttgart 1965.
- Georg Nees: ″Variationen von Figuren in der Graphik″, in: Grundlagenstudien aus Kybernetik und Geisteswissenschaft, vol. 5, no. 3/4, December 1964, Pages 121-125. G. N., Generative Computergraphik, Berlin, 1969.
- Georg Nees: ″Design und Programm″. In: Gesamttextil 1971, Pages 38–41.
- Georg Nees: ″Die Orchidee nimmt wahr″. In: Rottensteiner F. (Hrsg.): Polaris 6, Frankfurt am Main 1982, Pages 169-205.
- Georg Nees: ″Künstliche Kunst und Künstliche Intelligenz - Artificial Art and Artificial Intelligence″, In: Bilder Images Digital, Barke, München, Pages 58–67, 1986, text de, en.
- Georg Nees: ″Regency Graphics and the Esthetics Laboratory″: Picture Generation by Point-Distinction and Pseudodistance Minimizing. LEONARDO 23, No. 4, Pages 335-361 (1990).
- Georg Nees: ″Was ist Morphographie?″, SEMIOSIS 63/64, Heft 3/4, Pages 9–31 (1991).
- Georg Nees: ″Metamorphosen - Eine Übung in Morphographie″. SEMIOSIS Pages 65/66, 67/68, Sonderausgabe SEMIOSIS 65-68, Heft 1-4, 1992: Festschrift für Elisabeth Walter-Bense, Pages 258-268 (1992a).
- Georg Nees: ″Das Chaos - der Computer - die Form″. In Holeczek, von Mengden 1992, Pages 113-117.
- Georg Nees: ″Das Aleatorische, das Berechenbare und das Programm″. In: Nake 1993, Pages 139-164.
- Georg Nees: ″Fraktale - Geburt einer Zeichenfamilie″. WECHSELWIRKUNG, Nr. 65, Feb. 1994, Pages 11–16 (1994a).
- Georg Nees: ″Was bedeutet eine Welt, in der die simulierte Wirklichkeit immer realer wird?″, In: Naturwissenschaft und Kunst Kunst und Naturwissenschaft - Versuche der Begegnung, Universität Leipzig, Kustodie, Pages 42–46 (1994c).
- Georg Nees: ″Computable Beauty″. In Brunnstein K., E. Raubold (Eds.): IFIP Transactions: Applications and Impacts, Information Processing '94, Vol II, Amsterdam, Pages 398-405 (1994b).
- Georg Nees: ″Geometry and the Cognitive Principle in Semiotics and Esthetics″. SEMIOSIS Pages 77–78, Heft 1/2 (1995).
- Georg Nees: ″Growth, Structural Coupling and Competition in Kinetic Art″, - Leonardo, 2000 - MIT Press, February 2000, Vol. 33, No. 1, Pages 41–47.

== Exhibitions ==
- 1972: The Museum Abteiberg, Mönchengladbach, received from the Hans Joachim Etzold collection works from the early days of computer art. Karl Otto Götz, the influential painter of German Informel, advised Etzold to collection computer graphics. Graphics and sculptures by Nees are part of the collection.
- 1973: Programm- Zufall – System.
- 1987: Sammlung Etzold, Anfänge der Computergrafik.
- 2006: Anfänge der Computergraphik - aus der Sammlung Etzold.

=== Solo exhibition ===
- 1965: computer graphik, Studiengalerie Technische Hochschule Stuttgart.
- 2005: Georg Nees. Künstliche Kunst: Die Anfänge, Kupferstichkabinett der Kunsthalle Bremen.
- 2006: Georg Nees – The Great Temptation. Early generative computer graphics, ZKM | Zentrum für Kunst und Medien, Karlsruhe.
- 2026: Georg NEES 100, Heike Werner Gallery, Munich.

=== Group exhibitions ===
- 1965: Computerkunst, Frieder Nake und Georg Nees, Galerie Niedlich, Stuttgart.
- 1968: Cybernetic Serendipity, ICA, London.
- 1968-69: Computer und visuelle Forschung, Nuove Tendenze 4, Zagreb.
- 1969: On the Eve of Tomorrow, Kubus Hannover, München, Hamburg.
- 1969: Konstruktive Kunst: Elemente + Prinzipien, Biennale Nürnberg.
- 1970: Auf dem Weg zur Computerkunst, Kiel, Davos, Offenbach.
- 1970: Ricerca e Progettazione., Georg Nees, Ludwig Rase, 35. Biennale Venedig.
- 1971: Was die Schönheit sei, das weiß ich nicht. Künstler - Theorie - Werk, Biennale Nürnberg.
- 1971: Computer drawer spacestructure, ARTEONICA, Ludwig Rase, Georg Nees, São Paulo.
- 1971: The Arte de Sistemas exhibition, CAYC, Museo de Arte Moderno, Buenos Aires.
- 1972: Grenzgebiete der bildenden Kunst, Staatsgalerie Stuttgart.
- 1972-74: Wege zur Computerkunst, Wanderausstellung, Goethe Institut.
- 1973: computer art. nees rase, Hamburger Kunsthalle, Hamburg.
- 1973: Vert l'art de l'ordinateur, Centre d'Information SIGMA, Bordeaux.
- 1982: L'art systématique, Musée d´art contemporain de Montréal, Montreal.
- 1986: Bilder Images Digital, Galerie der Künstler, München.
- 1989: 25 Jahre Computerkunst, BMW Pavilion, München.
- 1992: Prinzip Zufall, Wilhelm Hack Museum, Ludwigshafen.
- 2005: Künstliche Kunst. Die Anfänge, Kunsthalle Bremen, Bremen.
- 2006: Die große Versuchung. Frühe generative Computergrafiken, ZKM, Karlsruhe.
- 2006: 20th Century Computer Art: Beginnings and Developments, Tama Art University Museum, Tokyo.
- 2006: Die Neuen Tendenzen - Museum für Konkrete Kunst, Ingolstadt.
- 2006: Der Traum von der Zeichenmaschine, Kunstverein Wolfsburg, Wolfsburg.
- 2007: Ex Machina - Frühe Computergrafik bis 1979, Kunsthalle Bremen, Bremen.
- 2007: Die Neuen Tendenzen, Leopold Hoesch Museum, Düren.
- 2008: Genau + anders - Mathematik in der Kunst von Dürer bis Sol LeWitt; MUMOK, Wien.
- 2008: bit international. [Nove] tendencije | Computer und visuelle Forschung, Zagreb.
- 2008: Genesis – Die Kunst der Schöpfung, Zentrum Paul Klee, Bern.
- 2009: Digital Pioneers, Victoria & Albert Museum - V&A, London.
- 2014: Histories of the Post-Digital: 1960s and 1970s Media Art Snapshots - Akbank Art Center, Istanbul.
- 2018: Chance and Control: Art in the Age of Computers, Victoria & Albert Museum - V&A, London.
- 2018: Programmierte Kunst. Frühe Computergraphik, Kunsthalle Bremen.
- 2024-2025: Electric Dreams. Art and Technology before the Internet, Tate Modern, London

=== Collections ===
- Sammlung Etzold, Städtische Museum Abteiberg, Mönchengladbach.
- Victoria and Albert Museum, London.
- Zentrum für Kunst und Medientechnologie, ZKM, Karlsruhe.
- Sammlung Franke, Kunsthalle Bremen, Bremen.

== Reception ==
=== Modern generative graphic design ===
Georg Nees was not only a pioneer of computer art, but also one of the grandfathers of computer supported design processes – the Generative Design. In 1963, the Zuse Graphomat Z64 was used to draw technical plans, which are required for the manufacture of parts and products. As he said, he thought also of his ideas - to make experimental and generative design. The reason for him to write the book "Formel - Farbe - Form", 1995, was to convey his knowledge about "Computer aesthetics of Media and Design" - based on generative design - to the next generation of designers. The current generation of designers uses as professional title for example "generative design" and operates under the concept of generative Design, data driven art or computational design. Nees also makes it one of the progenitors of today's generative design for art, advertising and animation – based on his Ph.D. thesis Generative Computergraphik and the book Generative Computergraphik in 1969.

== Literature ==
- Max Bense: Projekte generativer Ästhetik, in: rot 19, edition rot . Stuttgart 1965.
- Jasia Reichardt (Hrsg): Cybernetic Serendipity: the Computers and the Arts, London, 1968
- Herbert W. Franke: Computergraphik, Computerkunst, Bruckmann, 1971, ISBN 3765414123
- Frieder Nake: Ästhetik als Informationsverarbeitung: Grundlagen und Anwendungen der Informatik im Bereich ästhetischer Produktion und Kritik, Springer, 1974, ISBN 9783211812167
- Linda Candy: Explorations in Art and Technology, Springer, Softcover reprint of the original 1st ed. 2002 (2013), ISBN 9781447111030
- Christoph Klütsch: Computergrafik: Ästhetische Experimente zwischen zwei Kulturen. Die Anfänge der Computerkunst in den 1960er Jahren, Springer, 2007, ISBN 9783211394090
- Hans Esselborn: Ordnung und Kontingenz: das kybernetische Modell in den Künsten, Königshausen u. Neumann, 2008, ISBN 9783826037801
- Honor Beddard, Douglas Dodds: Digital Pioneers, Victoria & Albert Museum, 2009, ISBN 9781851775873
- Andrea Gleiniger und Georg Vrachliotis: Code. Zwischen Operation und Narration. Birkhäuser Verlag, 2010, ISBN 9783034601177
- Grant D. Taylor: When the Machine Made Art: The Troubled History of Computer Art, Bloomsbury Publishing, 2014, ISBN 9781623568849
