= Alex Kempkens =

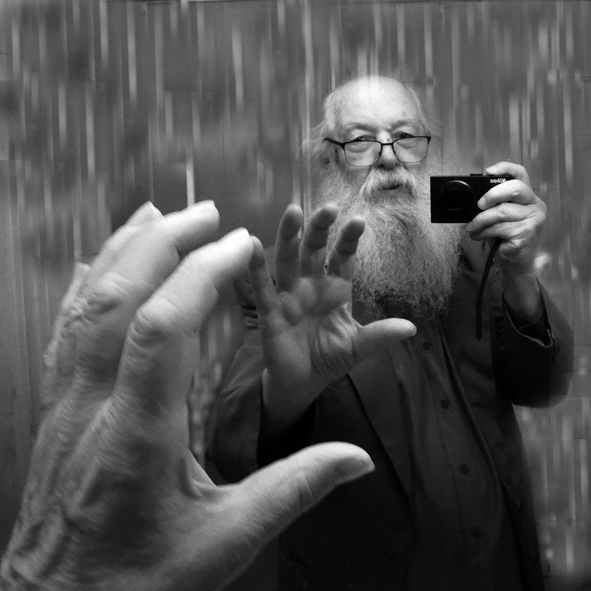
Alex Kempkens' Self Portrait, 2021, Alex goes through the mirror

Alex Kempkens (born Alexander Kempkens, 24 September 1942) is a German photographer, photojournalist and computer artist. He also writes articles and curates exhibitions. Kempkens is an autodidact.

== Life ==
=== Early life ===
Born in Linz am Rhein, Germany, Kempkens grew up during the Second World War in Scheuren. From 1947 he lived in Gerresheim and received his first camera in 1951. At the age of 14 he began an apprenticeship as a high voltage electrician at the Mannesmann tube rolling mills in Düsseldorf. In addition to his work as a high voltage electrician, he took photos with a Voigtländer camera, which he had received from his mother. He completed a course for photo lab work at the community college and bought some simple laboratory equipment. From 1962, his photographs were shown at the Photokina for the German Youth Photo Prize.

Kempkens attended night school, but left before graduating in October 1966, to start a two-year internship as a photojournalist with Jürgen Retzlaff at the Düsseldorfer Nachrichten. In the second year of voluntary service, he worked at the Neuss city desk. From 1965 onwards Kempkens traveled regularly to Prague where he mixed with Czech climber friends he had met in 1964 in the Tatra Mountains. On 1 May 1967 he was back in Prague and photographed the 1 May Parade as a reporter. Instead of photos of tanks and marching soldiers his photos showed young soldiers as Blues players as they walked with their girlfriends together in the parade. It was spring in Prague and the young soldiers showed that to them the Prague Spring already lived. A photo was published in the Düsseldorf Nachrichten after his return.

In August 1968, he traveled with Jochen M. Raffelberg, who was also a volunteer with the Düsseldorf Nachrichten, to Biafra. Their report about the Biafra war received national attention. Five of the photographs were published on 2 September 1968 as a double page spread in Der Spiegel magazine under the title "A nation is dying".

=== Munich ===
In November 1968, Kempkens moved to Munich, where on 1 December he became a photojournalist at the Deutsche Presse-Agentur (DPA). In January 1970, he joined the newly established newspaper Tz in Munich. From the autumn of 1971, he worked as a freelance photojournalist in Munich. In the summer of 1972 Kempkens was an assistant at advertising photographer Jan Keetman and subsequently also worked as a commercial photographer.

In 1973, he added architectural photography to his portfolio and from spring of 1975, Endoscopy photography for Architectural models. His endoscopy photos from the model of the new planned building for the German Parliament in Bonn, 1975, by the architectural firm Behnisch & Partner were published in 1976 the Süddeutsche Zeitung. The art critic of the newspaper, Doris Schmidt wrote a one-sided discussion of the planned new building of the Bundestag in Bonn. In the caption to the endoscope photos, she noted: This is the first time that a newspaper has published endoscopic images of an architecture model. Other publications of the endoscope photos followed. In particular, his endoscope photos of the planning to redesign the Königsplatz, Munich led to articles about his work in PM Magazine.

He also photographed with endoscopes for advertising and free experiments. In January 1980, he had a solo exhibition of his endoscopy photos in Munich. There then followed a series of publications in German magazines, such as in the ZEITmagazin. In the magazine for professional photographers ProfiFoto Jürgen G. Gumprich wrote: And it's probably Alex Kempkens who deserves credit for having made this commonly medically attributed endoscopy technology into a socially acceptable practice in this country. Gumbricht is referring to pictures published in almost all former German photography magazines such as Color Photo, Foto Revue and Nikon News for amateur and professional photographers.

==== Analog to digital ====
In 1982, Kempkens produced a photograph for PM Magazine, Munich, with an endoscope showing a computer monitor in which an image of Albert Einstein was mounted. The final image of Einstein was created with Image processing software. The assembly of the two images was used as the cover image for the PM "Computer '82 issue". After publication he contacted the editorial staff and received the information that led to the purchase of his first computer in December 1982. The computer was a PDP11 / 24 + made by DEC.

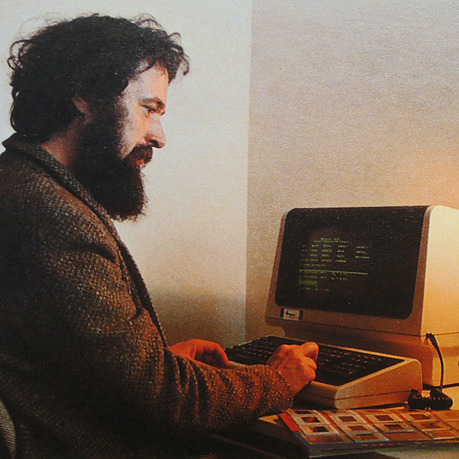
Alex Kempkens, working on his PDP 11-24+ DEC computer, 1982

As early as the autumn of 1982 he experimented with the image processing software then in May 1983 images of his experiments were published for the first time in the magazine Photo Revue. His first digital images were used by DEC as the invitation card for the 1983 Systems fair in Munich. In January 1984, the German magazine Chip published the digital images of the invitation card in the article From the Image to process. The author wrote,

It takes an artist's eye to discover in addition to the practical also the aesthetic benefit of this technique Image Processing. [...] The result are color images in a mixture of reality and the irrational as it may be indicative of a whole era.

The author of the article foresaw that in the next few years digital images, which until then were almost exclusively used in various industrial, medical and scientific fields, would be used in the computer art and graphics fields.

The first solo exhibition of his experiments was entitled "Digital color photos" in January 1984 at the Art Light gallery in Munich. The exhibition was the reason that in the first issue of 1984 the magazine Form printed a four-page report on Kempkens and his digital art and publicity photos. The introduction to the article read, It's the classic side of computer graphics: they are typical computer images, these examples – or the fun of the artist with the computer. The word "fun" used by the editor "refers to the then predominantly present fear of computers – in the profession of design, too. Klaus von Gaffron visited the solo exhibition and spoke to Kempkens and advised him to apply to become a member for the Professional Association of Visual Artists Munich and Upper Bavaria (BBK). Kempkens followed the advice and was accepted. In December 1985 his digital photo portraits appeared at the group exhibition Photography Portrait in the Gallery of the Artist of the BBK.

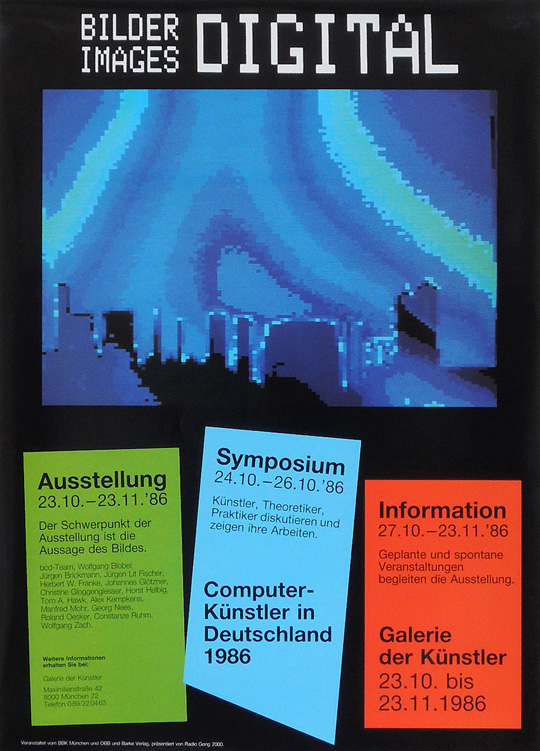
Poster for the exhibition Bilder Images Digital, 1986; Digital art Landscape 1 by Alex Kempkens

In early 1985 Kempkens proposed to the Exhibition Committee of the BBK that a group exhibition of computer art be held at the Gallery of Artists in Munich. His concept was accepted in the fall of 1985 and the exhibition Bilder Images Digital took place in October 1986 in the Gallery of the Artist. He organized, curated the exhibition and showed his own works. At the exhibition, he produced the catalog "Bilder Images Digital, computer artist in Germany '86". The slogan on the exhibition poster was The focus of the exhibition is the statement of the picture. Kempkens also explicitly emphasized this in the preface to the catalog when he wrote, We exhibit pictures. It was planned by him as a clear distinction between computer images and computer graphic thereby anticipating the coming dominance of digital imagery.

Parallel to the exhibition, he organized a symposium and a workshop in the gallery of the artist. To the symposium he had the first computer art pioneers among other Frieder Nake and Georg Nees invited. The moderator of the conference was Richard Kriesche. The critic of the Munich evening newspaper, Peter M. Bode, wrote about the symposium: The computer artists thus argue that the sparks fly [...] something like the passionate discussions that there must have been when photography first appeared.

The pioneer of this art, Georg Nees, wrote in a letter to the newspaper "Bilder Digital",

I may with the greatest satisfaction to say that I have never experienced in the short history of computer art so haunting event, such as the Munich Symposium.

For the exhibition Nees created a game world in a new series of architectural drawings. Nees wrote in his letter also that he liked very much the talks with the young generation of computer artists at the symposium.

At the workshop and for the first time in Germany, an art exhibition showed six Amiga 1000s with a connected video station and color printer for young and old visitors to experiment with. Visitors could paint images in 4096 colors and print them in color. About the video station analog images been converted to digital images. The visitors used then this data to create new digital images with the Amiga 1000. The results could also be printed in color and put at the wall of the workshop.

For the exhibition Bilder Images Digital Kempkens scrapped an IBM computer system, calling the actions and performance Computer Burger. This computer system had cost more than a decade ago with the purchase by a company for about one million German marks. The event took place in September 1986 at a recycling plant for cars and others in Munich. The computer was transformed into a pile of junk. The scrap was packed in a metal barrel and as Computer Burger placed in the entrance hall of the Gallery of the Artist. A video of the event was produced and on show beside the Computer Burger.

Starting in 1987, following other exhibitions of his works, Ferdinand Ullrich commissioned Kempens to develop and produce the computer game Zeche Recklinghausen II. The adventure of a miner in 1903 – 1913 for the exhibition "Work and Rhythm" at the 41st Ruhr Festival in Recklinghausen. This came from an idea of Ullrich. In 1987, he was invited by Richard Kriesche to the group exhibition "Blurring boundaries 1" in the Künstlerhaus Graz. The symposium for the exhibition was held in Venice.

=== Montreal ===
In February 1986, Kempkens was contacted by Hervé Fischer from Montreal. With his partner Ginette Mayor, Fischer had founded the company Cité des arts et des nouvelles technologies de Montréal to stage the exhibition Images du Futur in Montreal. Fischer invited Kempkens to show his Digital Images at the exhibition, which ran for several months from May 1986 in the Old Port of Montreal. Kempkens sent his work to Montreal. In 1987, 1990, 1991 and 1994 his digital images were also shown at the Images du Futur exhibition. For the catalog title and the exhibition poster of Image du Futur '90, a picture of him was selected. The whole archive of the exhibition Images du Futur is now in the possession of the Daniel Langlois Foundation and can be used online for research. For the exhibition Images du Futur in 1991 he was invited by Fischer and Major to come to Montreal. He traveled to Montreal and stayed after the show continued in the city. Fischer knew the architectural photos by Kempkens from Munich and therefore urged him to make nice pictures from Old Montreal (Vieux-Montréal). Kempkens took over this task, which posed a particular challenge. Every house in Old Montreal was already described in all the architecture details, and photographed. Phyllis Lambert, founder of the Canadian Centre for Architecture (CCA) in Montreal, herself lived in the area and had one of the first documentaries created. She was responsible for the contract to Ludwig Mies van der Rohe to build the Seagram Building in New York City.

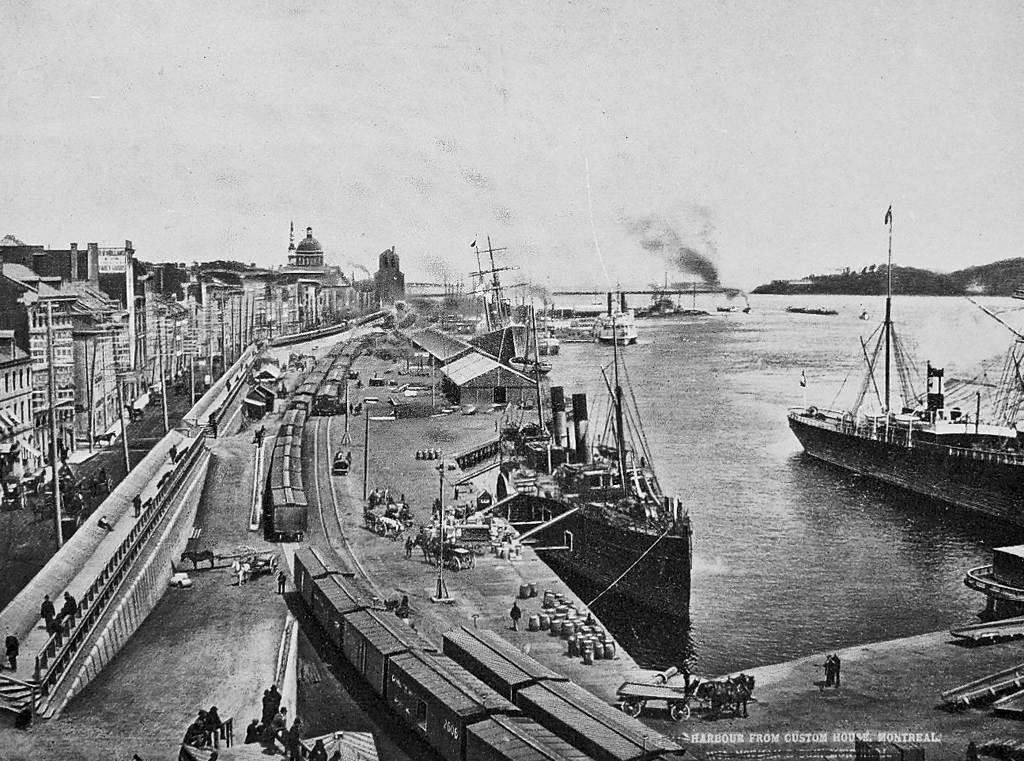
Old Port of Montreal, Photo circa 1899

Kempkens' Photos of Old Montreal have been exhibited in the gallery Le Compagnonnage, which he founded in 1992. He published the book Pierres de chants de Montréal for this exhibition. The text in the book by Monique Brunet-Weinmann Dialectic of the Wall and the Way, La dialectique du Mur et de la Voie describes the result as

En cette année du trois cent cinquantième anniversaire de sa fondation, il est admirable qu'un citoyen nouveau venu, nous rappelle le plan fondateur de Ville-Marie, dessiné par les solides fondations de ses bâtiments. Puisse-t-on entendre ces pierres des Chants (...). In this year of the three hundred and fiftieth anniversary of its founding, it is admirable that a newly arrived citizens can help us recall the old plans of Ville-Marie, skechet by the solid base of its buildings. May we hear these singing stones ....

Brunet-Weinmann compares the photos to the etching of Paris, Charles Meryon at the time of Baudelaire drew. The buildings in Old Montreal had not been photographed individually and isolated, as is usual in architectural photography, but Kempkens has photographed the buildings incorporated into the growing environment of the urban landscape. The architecture of the Old Montreal photos were on show in 1997 parallel with the Le Mois de la Photo in Montreal again in a solo exhibition in Bonsecours Market.

In autumn 1992 Kempkens was invited by Jacques Charbonneau, founder of the "Centre Copie-Art" in Montreal, to be an artist in residence at the "Gallery Arts Technologiques du Centre Copie Art". In January 1993, he had his first solo exhibition there entitled What is the prince looking for in the forest?, Que cherche le prince dans la forêt? He was an active member of the "Centre Copie-Art". There were other solo and group exhibitions in the Gallery Arts Technologiques and in other galleries in Montreal.

=== Lower Rhine ===
In 1999, Kempkens came back to Germany and settled in 2000 on the Lower Rhine. He took off in 2000 to several exhibitions with both analog and / or digital photos in Germany in part, such as at the cultural festival Duisburger Akzente. He met new artists at exhibitions and readings, especially Oskar Fahr, poet, journalist and philosopher. Oskar Fahr convinced Michael Arenz, publisher of The Mongol Waiting (Der Mongole wartet) to publish an article about Kempkens. Fahr wrote for the 2002 edition a critic on Kempkens. He used the digital photos to illustrate the critic and also to illustrat his own poems in the same issue of The Mongol waiting. Fahr wrote to the images of Kempkens:

These fairies and water virgins, usually in the foreground, not wearing a swimsuit, but they play with each other when they are in pairs. It is the computer artist not unlike Arnold Böcklin. The Rhine maidens of Kempkens own presence, and they produce the present.

Fahr refers in his text to the images of the exhibition Provider in an Other Time at the 23rd Duisburg Akzente. Kempkens had in Duisburg, as well as in Montreal, the images of young women of the town merged with the current architecture of the urban landscape and the Rhine landscape. The correspondence on the subject and the images of the exhibition "What is the prince looking for in the forest?" Where he can look for the princess in the modern city of the prince and not in the woods of fairy tales. Arenz published, under his chosen title "Satori in Montreal" in the 2004 edition the poems in English and French with the pictures by Kempkens.

In November 2014 architectural photos by Kempkens from 1975 were published in the book "Helmut von Werz – An architect Life 1912–1990" and shown at the exhibition "Helmut von Werz" at the Munich Architecture Gallery.

== Oeuvre ==
- Yes, but a computer says more than a thousand pictures! ’Landscap 8 (1983).

== Catalogs ==
- Bilder Images Digital – Computerkünstler in Deutschland ’86, Barke Verlag, München 1986.
- Pierres des chants de Montréal: Vieux Montréal – Old Montreal, Galerie Le Compagnonnage, Montreal 1992.
- Was sucht der Prinz im Wald? Que cherche le prince dans la forêt? What is the prince looking for in the forest?, Le Centre Copie-Art Montréal, München 1993.

== Exhibitions ==
=== Individual exhibitions ===
- 1984: Digital Art, Galerie Kunstlicht, München.
- 1986: Alex Kempkens, Galerie E, Zürich.
- 1993: Que cherche le prince dans la forêt?, Galerie Arts Technologiques, Montréal.
- 1994: Les Courants Nocturnes, Galerie Arts Technologiques, Montréal.
- 1997: Pierres des chants de Montréal, Galerie Le Compagnonnage, Montréal.
- 2001: La fée de Montréal danse pour moi, Galerie Gerber, Duisburg.

=== Group shows ===
- 1962–1968: Deutscher Jugendfotopreis, Photokina, Köln.
- 1968/1969: World Press Photo.
- 1970: V. Interpressfoto, Prag.
- 1971/1972: World Press Photo.
- 1986: Image du future, Montreal.
- 1986: Bilder Images Digital, München.
- 1986: SIGGRAPH, Dallas.
- 1987: Das Abenteuer ein Bergmann zu sein, 1903–1913, Museum Recklinghausen.
- 1987: Images du Futur, Montréal.
- 1987: Entgrenzte Grenzen, Graz.
- 1987: F.A.U.S.T Forum des Arts de L’Univers Scientifique et Technique, Toulus.
- 1988: Bavarian Art Nowadays, Kairo, Alexandria.
- 1989: 25 Jahre Computerkunst, BMW Pavilion, München.
- 1990: Images du Futur, Montréal.
- 1991: Images du Futur, Montréal.
- 1994: Immigrant. Images du Futur, Montréal.
- 1994: La marche pour la liberté, Galerie Arts Technologiques, Montréal.
- 1995: La fille et son Chat-cheval, Galerie CIRKA, Montréal.
- 1996: Atrium Verre, Centre Copie-Art dans le cadre de ISEA, Montréal.
- 1997: Don Quichotte, Centre Copie-Art, Montréal.
- 1999: Tête ou Bitch, Conseil de la sculpture du Québec, Montréal.
- 2000: Provider in an other time, Projekt ArtCrossing, 23. Duisburger Akzente.
- 2014: Helmut von Werz – Ein Architektenleben 1912–1990, Architekturgalerie, München.
- 2015: Heimat, 36. Duisburger Akzente, Galerie Dat Atelljee, Duisburg-Rheinhausen

== Awards ==
- „Jugend und Alter“, Auszeichnung, Deutscher Jugendfotopreis 1968.
- „Demonstrant und Polizei“, München, Silbermedaille, V. Interpressfoto, Prag, 1970.
- „Natur als Baumeister“, Endoskopiefotografie, Auszeichnung, Kodak Kalender Wettbewerb, Stuttgart, 1978.

== Literature ==
- Modellfotografie: Mit dem Endoskop ins Reich der Miniwelt. In: P.M. Magazin, Nr. 11 (1978), S. 11.
- Wolfgang Stegers: Löwenzahn: Wie entsteht eigentlich eine Pusteblume? In: P.M.Magazin, Nr. 7 (1979), S. 4–5.
- Volker Wachs: Die andere Perspektive. In: Color Foto, Januar 1980, S. 135–141.
- Jürgen G. Gumprich: Alex Kempkens, Endographie. In: ProfiFOTO, Nr. 4 (1981), S. 36–41.
- D. H. Bauer: Porträt eines Endoskopisten. In: Nikon News, Nr. 2 (1982), S. 44–47.
- Jean Paul Laub: Programmkunst – Kunstprogramm? In: Professional CamerA, Mai 1983, S. 138–145.
- Alex Kempkens: Filwrite! >>Pixles-Spiele<< – mit digitaler Fotografie. In: form. Zeitschrift für Gestaltung Nr. 1 (1984), S. 42–45.
- Jutta Tezmen-Siegel, Alex Kempkens: FOTOGRAFIE PORTRÄT, Berufsverband Bildender Künstler München u. Oberbayern, München 1985.
- Susanne Päch: Computer-Portraits von Alex Kempkens. In: Novum Gebrauchsgraphik, September 1985, S. 46–51.
- Dorota Kozinska: Old city is captured by German artist. In: The Gazette., September 1997, Section C.
- Maxim Pouska: Computer – Werbung 1935–2010 Grafik-Design und Kunst, BOD, 2011, S. 119–120.
