= Otto Beckmann =

Austrian sculptor and computer art pioneer (1908–1997)

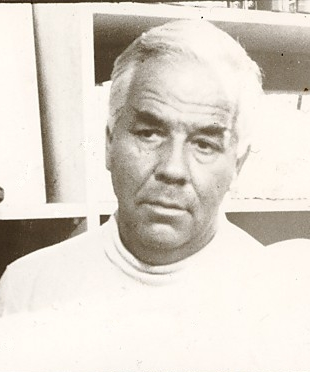
Otto Beckmann

Otto Beckmann (5 May 1908, in Vladivostok, Russia – 13 February 1997, in Vienna, Austria) was an Austrian sculptor and pioneer of media and computer art.

== Life ==
The family was forced to flee to Austria in 1922 where Otto Beckmann graduated from the HTL (Federal Secondary College of Engineering) in Mödling near Vienna and the Academy of Fine Arts in Vienna. In 1941, he became professor at the Institute for Arts and Crafts in Kraków.

Since 1945, he lived as an independent artist in Vienna and was a member of the Austrian Professional Association of Fine Arts. In 1951, he became a member of the Vienna Secession. In 1958, he was bestowed the professor title by the Austrian Federal Chancellor.

Otto Beckmann had 25 personal exhibitions and participated in more than 75 exhibitions in Austria and abroad.

== Work ==
The comprehensive and manifold art work by Otto Beckmann took place in the broad field between mystics and algorithms. It comprises paintings and sculptures as well as new forms of expression like abstract films and imaginary architecture (1966).

In 1966, he founded ars intermedia in cooperation with scientists of the Technical University Vienna. Among the members were Alfred Grassl, Oskar Beckmann and Gerd Koepf. The group was active until 1980. Otto Beckmann participated in the international symposium on computer art in Zagreb and is regarded as “one of the pioneers of media and computer art” (Peter Weibel).

Otto Beckmann's works are in the Albertina, Vienna; the Austrian Federal Ministry of Education; the State Museum of Lower Austria, MUSA Vienna; Neue Gallerie Graz; Kunsthalle Bremen, Germany, ZKM Karlsruhe, Germany; as well as numerous private collections. Beckmann created a great number of mosaics on Vienna residential buildings as well as windows and doors in sacred buildings by Robert Kramreiter.

In 2005 the Archiv Otto Beckmann was founded by his son Richard.

Today the artist is mainly known for his works as a pioneer of computer art in the 1960s and 1970s.

== Exhibitions ==
Otto Beckmann took part in historically significant exhibitions in the history of computer art.

=== Group Exhibitions ===
- 1969: Tendencije 4 / Tendencies 4. Computers and visual research, Galerija suvremene umjetnosti, Zagreb, HR (former YU)
- 1969: Computer-Kunst. On the Eve of Tomorrow, Kubus, Hanover, DE
- 1969: Kunst und Computer, Zentralsparkasse Wien, AT
- 1970: Impulse Computerkunst: Graphik, Plastik, Musik, Film, travelling exhibition, multiple Goethe-Institutes worldwide
- 1973: Tendencije 5 /Tendencies 5. Computer Visual Research, Zagreb, HR (former YU)
- 2007: Ex Machina – early computer graphics up to 1979, Kunsthalle Bremen, Bremen, DE
- 2025: Le monde selon l‘IA, Musée du Jeu de Paume, Paris, FR, 2025

=== Solo Exhibitions ===
- 1969: Elektronische Computerkunst und cinematrische Abläufe (Visual Research), Wiener Secession, Wien, AT
- 1969: ars intermedia. Werkbeiträge zur Computerkunst, Zentralsparkasse Wien, AT
- 1973: Sztuka Komputerowa Grupy ‚ars intermedia‘, Galeria Współczesna – Österreichisches Kulturinstitut, Warschau, PL
- 2006: Otto Beckmanns Kunstcomputer und die Anfänge der Computerkunst, Kupferstichkabinett Kunsthalle Bremen, Bremen
- 2008: Otto Beckmann (1908-1997). Zwischen Mystik und Kalkül, Neue Galerie Graz, AT
- 2026: Imaginary Architecture: Otto Beckmann & ars intermedia. 1968-1980, Heike Werner Galerie, Munich, DE
