= Döhl =

Döhl is a German language surname. Spelling variants include Dohl, Döhle and Dohle. The name may refer to:

- Friedhelm Döhl (1936–2018), German composer
- Karl Gottfried Paul Döhle (1855–1928), German pathologist
- Reinhard Döhl (1934–2004), German writer

== See also ==
- Döhlau, a town in Germany
- Döhle (IOM) Ltd, a Manx shipping company
- Döhle bodies, cellular components
- Döhler, a German food company
- DfT OLR Holdings, abbreviated as DOHL
