= Joseph Beuys Media Archive =

Archive in Germany

The Joseph Beuys Media Archive (German: Joseph Beuys Medien-Archiv) is an institution affiliated with the Museum of Contemporary Art, Berlin and the Joseph Beuys Estate, Düsseldorf. Its purpose is to collect, archive, digitize, and publicize the work of the German artist Joseph Beuys.

== Founding ==
The archive was opened on November 5, 1996 with two premiere exhibits. One of these was a double projection of Coyote III, a happening that Beuys had first performed in Tokyo together with Nam June Paik. The other was a performance by Takehisa Kosugi, who debuted a previously un-played score by John Cage. The musical score had been a gift from Cage to Beuys on the occasion of his 60th birthday.

== Selected publications ==
- Eva, Wenzel, Jessyka Beuys (Ed.): Joseph Beuys. Coyote III (1984), No. I; Staatliche Museen zu Berlin 1996 (Booklet), ISBN 3-88609-396-4
- Eva Beuys, Wenzel Beuys: Joseph Beuys. Coyote III, Konzert 1984 mit Nam June Paik. Pianovariation 1984, Seibu Museum of Art, Tokyo, Sôgetsu Hall 18^{15} − 19^{15}. Steidl-Verlag, Göttingen 2008 (Booklet with DVD), ISBN 978-3-86521-752-3
- Joseph Beuys. Ja, Ja, Ja, Ja, Ja, Nee, Nee, Nee, Nee, Nee (1968), No. II; Staatliche Museen zu Berlin 2001 (CD), no ISBN
- Eugen Blume (Introduction): Joseph Beuys. Provokation Lebensstoff der Gesellschaft / Kunst und Antikunst (Discussion „ende offen. Kunst und Antikunst“ between Max Bense, Joseph Beuys, Max Bill, Arnold Gehlen, Wieland Schmied, 27 January 1970). Buchhandlung Walter König, Cologne 2003; (Booklet with DVD), ISBN 3-88609-077-9
- Eva Beuys, Wenzel Beuys: Joseph Beuys. Transsibirische Bahn (1970). Steidl-Verlag, Göttingen 2004 (Booklet with DVD), ISBN 3-88243-998-X
- Eva Beuys, Wenzel Beuys: Joseph Beuys. Eurasienstab, 1967. Steidl-Verlag, Göttingen 2005; (Booklet DVD), ISBN 3-86521-194-1
