= Desmond Paul Henry =

British philosopher (1921–2004)

- Henry with Drawing Machine 2, 1964
- Born: 5 July 1921; Huddersfield, Yorkshire, UK
- Died: 28 October 2004 (aged 83); Manchester, Lancashire, UK
- Notable work: Outputs of Drawing Machines 1,2 and 3
- Movement: Computer Art and Generative Art
- Spouse: Louisa Henriette Bayen (1920-1992)
- Children: Anne-Marie, born 1948. Rita, born 1951. Elaine, born 1957.
- Website: http://www.desmondhenry.com/

Desmond Paul Henry (5 July 1921 – 28 October 2004) was a Manchester University Lecturer and Reader in Philosophy (1949–82). He was one of the first British artists to experiment with machine-generated visual effects at the time of the emerging global computer art movement of the 1960s (The Cambridge Encyclopaedia 1990 p. 289; Levy 2006 pp. 178–180). During this period, Henry constructed a succession of three electro-mechanical drawing machines from modified bombsight analogue computers which were employed in World War II bombers to calculate the accurate release of bombs onto their targets (O'Hanrahan 2005). Henry's machine-generated effects resemble complex versions of the abstract, curvilinear graphics which accompany Microsoft's Windows Media Player. Henry's machine-generated effects may therefore also be said to represent early examples of computer graphics: "the making of line drawings with the aid of computers and drawing machines" (Franke 1971, p. 41). Henry often subsequently added hand-embellishments to his machine-generated effects in response to their suggestive features.

During the 1970s Henry focused on developing his Cameraless Photography experiments. He went on to make a fourth drawing machine in 1984 and a fifth pendulum design one in 2002 .

== Artistic career ==
It was thanks to artist L. S. Lowry, working in collaboration with the then director of Salford Art Gallery, A. Frape, that Henry's artistic career was launched in 1961 when he beat a thousand contestants to win a local art competition at Salford Art Gallery, entitled "London Opportunity." The picture that won Henry this prize was one based on his own experimental photo-chemical technique, and not a machine-drawing. The prize for winning this competition was a one-man exhibition show in London at the Reid Gallery. Lowry knew how crucial such a London show could be in bringing an artist to public attention. As one of the competition judges, Lowry visited Henry's home in Burford Drive, Manchester, to view his range of artistic work. (O'Hanrahan 2005). Here it was Lowry first saw Henry's Drawing Machine 1 in action. This led to Henry having "the world's first ever one-man machine show" (Henry) at Salford Art Gallery starting August 30th,1962 (Daily Herald, 30/08/1962). Lowry insisted Henry also include some machine drawings alongside his photo-chemical ones, in the concurrent London exhibition at the Reid Gallery also starting August 30,1962 and called "Ideographs" (O'Hanrahan 2005, Daily Herald, 30/08/1962). This London exhibition was his prize for winning the 1961 "London Opportunity" competition with a photo-chemical drawing, not a machine-drawing.

Following the concurrent 1962 Salford and London exhibitions of machine-produced effects together with their positive media coverage, Henry and his first drawing machine were included in the first ever programme in the BBC's North at Six series (September 1962). In 1963 Henry was approached by the American magazine Life (O'Hanrahan 2005). Henry and his first drawing machine were to be featured in this magazine, but the article was scrapped following the assassination of US President John F. Kennedy on November 22nd, 1963. The generally positive response his machine-pictures received reflects the zeitgeist of technological optimism of the 1960s (O'Hanrahan 2005). The Guardian of 17/9/62 described the images produced by this first machine as being "quite out of this world" and "almost impossible to produce by human hand".

Henry's machine-generated effects went on to be exhibited at various venues during the 1960s, the most major being Cybernetic Serendipity (1968) held at the Institute of Contemporary Arts (I.C.A) in London. This represented one of the most significant art and technology exhibitions of the decade (Goodman 1987). In this exhibition Drawing Machine 2 itself was included as an interactive exhibit. "Cybernetic Serendipity" then went on to tour the United States, where exhibition venues included the Corcoran Gallery in Washington and San Francisco's Palace of Fine Arts (O'Hanrahan 2005).

This second machine returned from its tour of the United States in 1972 in a complete state of disrepair (O'Hanrahan 2005). Such technical failures were not unusual in electric and motor-driven exhibition items (Rosenburg 1972). More recently, frequent mechanical and/or electronic computer breakdowns contributed to the decision to close Artworks, (The Lowry, Salford Quays, Manchester) in March 2003 after just less than three years in operation as a permanent, technology-based, interactive exhibition (O'Hanrahan 2005).

== Inspiration: the bombsight computer ==
The main component of Henry's three drawing machines of the 1960s was the bombsight computer. These mechanical analogue computers represented some of the most important technological advancements of World War II. However, by the 1960s they already represented "old" technology when compared to the more modern digital computers then available (O'Hanrahan 2005).

The mechanical analogue bombsight computer was employed in World War II bomber aircraft to determine the exact moment bombs were to be released to hit their target. The bombardier entered information on air and wind speed, wind direction, altitude, angle of drift and bomb weight into the computer which then calculated the bomb release point, using a complex arrangement of gyros, motors, gears linked to a separate telescope (Jacobs 1996).

It was in 1952 that Henry purchased his very first Sperry bombsight computer, in mint condition, from an army surplus warehouse in Shude Hill, Manchester. This purchase was inspired by Henry's lifelong passion for all things mechanical, which had been further fuelled by seven years serving as a technical clerk with the Royal Electrical and Mechanical Engineers during World War II (O'Hanrahan 2005). Henry so marvelled at the mechanical inner workings of this bombsight computer in motion, that nine years later in 1961 he decided to capture its "peerless parabolas" (as Henry termed its inner workings), on paper. He then modified the bombsight to create the first drawing machine of 1961. This first machine was "cannibalised" (Henry) to create a second one in the autumn of 1962. A third machine was constructed in 1967 (O'Hanrahan 2005). These machines created complex, abstract, asymmetrical, curvilinear images, which were either left untouched as completed drawings or embellished by the artist's hand in response to the suggestive machine-generated effects. None of Henry's drawing machines are currently in operational order and what remains of Drawing Machine 2 is held by the Science Museum London. Between 2012-19, artist-engineer Dr. Jack Tait developed an analogue drawing machine which he called "Homage to Henry" using the principles of reverse engineering and capable of producing effects similar to those of Henry's drawing machines.

== The drawing machines ==
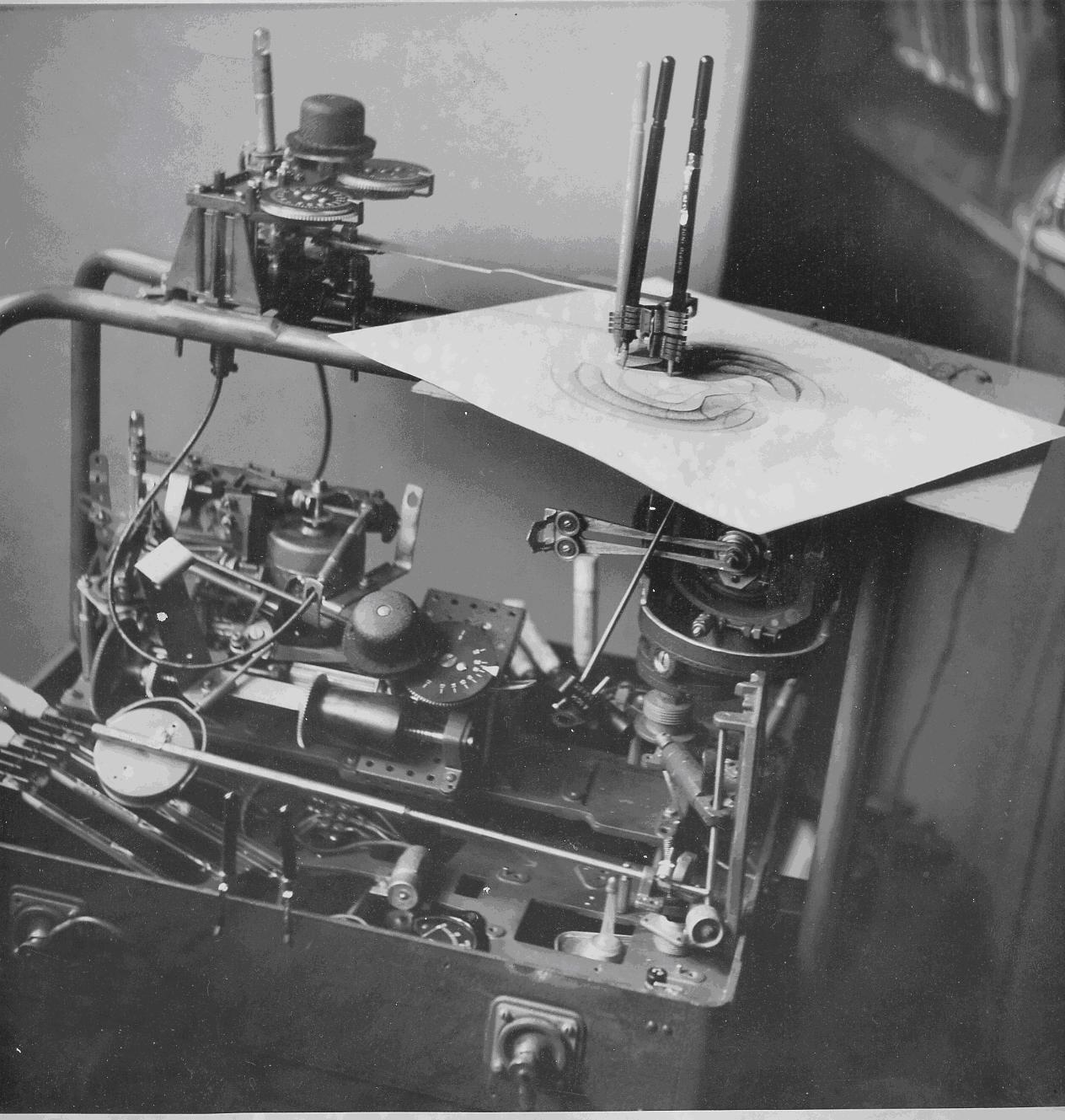
Henry's first drawing machine

Each Henry electromechanical drawing machine was based around an analogue bombsight computer in combination with other components which Henry happened to have acquired for his home-based workshop in Whalley Range, Manchester (O'Hanrahan 2005). Each machine took up to six weeks to construct and each drawing from between two hours to two days to complete. The drawing machines relied upon an external electric power source to operate either one or two servo motors which powered the synchronisation of suspended drawing implement(s) acting upon either a stationary or moving drawing table (O'Hanrahan 2005). With the first drawing machine Henry employed biros as the mark-making implement; however with the machines that followed he preferred to use Indian ink in technical tube pens, since these effects, in contrast to biro ink, do not risk fading upon prolonged exposure to sunlight (O'Hanrahan 2005).

== How the drawing machines operated ==
Henry's drawing machines were quite unlike the conventional computers of the 1960s since they could not be pre-programmed nor store information and nor did they use plotters to generate images on paper. (O'Hanrahan 2005). His machines relied instead, as did those of artist Jean Tinguely, upon a "mechanics of chance" (Pontus Hulten in Peiry 1997, p. 237). That is to say, they relied upon the chance relationship in the arrangement of each machine's mechanical components, the slightest alteration to which, (for example, a loosened screw), could dramatically impinge on the final result. In the words of Henry, he let each machine "do its own thing" in accordance with its sui generis mechanical features, with often surprising and unpredictable results. The imprecise way Henry's machines were both constructed and operated ensured that their effects could not be mass-produced and would be infinitely varied (O'Hanrahan 2005).

Such imprecise tools as Henry's machines, have been judged by some to enhance artistic creativity as opposed to modern computer imaging software which leaves no scope for artistic intuition (Smith 1997). Nor could Henry's machines have been accused of preventing the artist from exercising aesthetic choice. They were truly interactive, like modern computer graphic manipulation software. With a Henry drawing machine, the artist had general overall control and was free to exercise personal and artistic intuition at any given moment of his choosing during the drawing production process (O'Hanrahan, 2005).

Both these elements of chance and interaction were in contrast to most other computer artists or graphic designers of the period, for whom the first stage in producing a digital computer graphic was to conceive the end product. The next stage was one where, "mathematical formulae or geometric pattern manipulations (were) found to represent the desired lines. These were then programmed into a computer language, punched onto cards, and read into the computer" (Sumner 1968 p. 11).

== Machine-generated effects ==
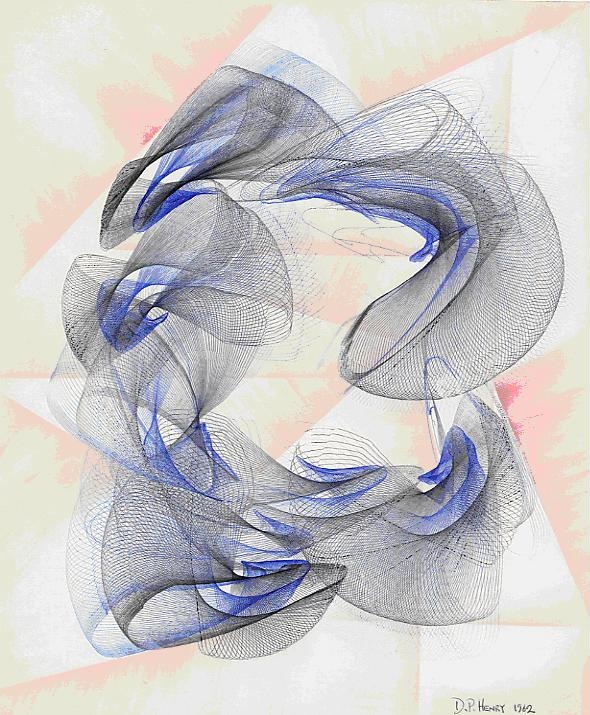
Picture produced by Drawing Machine 1

In 2001 Henry's machine-generated work was discussed in terms of the use made, since earliest times, of a range of tools for producing similar abstract, visual effects (O'Hanrahan 2001). Once Henry himself had beheld the visual effects produced by his first machine, he then strove to find possible precursors such as the organic forms described in natural form mathematics. (D'Arcy-Thompson 1917; Cook 1914). Henry also compared his machine-generated effects to those produced using earlier scientific and mathematical instruments such as: Suardi's Geometric Pen of 1750 (Adams 1813), Pendulum Harmonographs (Goold et al., 1909) and the Geometric Lathe as used in ornamental and bank-note engraving (Holtzapffel 1973 [1894]).

His inclusion in 1968 in "Cybernetic Serendipity" enabled him to further contrast his machine-generated effects with similar though less complex and varied ones produced using a variety of tools. These included effects displayed on a visual display screen using a cathode-ray oscilloscope (Ben F. Laposky in Cybernetic Serendipity 1968) and those produced using a mechanical plotter linked to either a digital (Lloyd Sumner in Cybernetic Serendipity 1968) or analogue computer (Maughan S. Mason in Cybernetic Serendipity 1968). However Henry's drawing machines, in contrast to other precision mark-making instruments like the lathe and mechanical plotter, relied heavily upon the element of chance both in their construction and function (O'Hanrahan 2005). This random characteristic ensured the unrepeatable quality of his machine-generated effects.

== Fractal mathematics ==
Henry's introduction in 2001 to the aesthetic application of fractal mathematics (Briggs 1994 [1992]) provided Henry with the necessary terms of reference for describing the chance-based operational aspects of his machines. Fractal mathematics could also help describe the aesthetic appreciation of his machine-generated effects or "Mechanical Fractals" (Henry 2002) as he came to term them (O'Hanrahan 2005).

Fractal systems are produced by a dynamic, non-linear system of interdependent and interacting elements; in Henry's case, this is represented by the mechanisms and motions of the drawing machine itself (O'Hanrahan 2005). In a fractal system, as in each Henry drawing machine, very small changes or adjustments to initial influences can have far-reaching effects.

Fractal images appeal to our intuitive aesthetic appreciation of order and chaos combined. Each Henry machine-produced drawing bears all the hallmarks of a fractal image since they embody regularity and repetition coupled with abrupt changes and discontinuities (Briggs 1994[1992]). In other words, they exhibit self-similarity (similar details on different scales) and simultaneous order and chaos. These images also resemble fractal "strange attractors", since groups of curves present in the machine-generated effects tend to form clusters creating suggestive patterns (Briggs 1994[1992]).

Fractal patterns, similar to Henry's machine-generated effects, have been found to exist when plotting volcanic tremors, weather systems, the ECG of heart beats and the electroencephalographic data of brain activity (Briggs 1994[1992]).

Henry found in fractals a means of both classifying his artistic activity and describing the aesthetic appreciation of his visual effects. Among the many artists who have previously employed what are now recognised as fractal images, are: "Vincent van Gogh's dense swirls of energy around objects; the recursive geometries of Maritus Escher; the drip-paint, tangled abstractions of Jackson Pollock" (Briggs 1994[1992] p.66). Henry himself when writing to his daughter Elaine in 1999 ( Letter Five, O'Hanrahan 2005 ) referred to his machine-drawings as "Machine Pollocks".

== Art and technology ==
Some would argue that scientific and technological advances have always influenced art in terms of its inspiration, tools and visual effects. In the words of Douglas Davis: "Art can no more reject either technology or science than it can the world itself" (Davis 1973, introduction). In his writings Henry himself often expressed his lifelong enthusiasm for fruitful collaborations between art and technology (Henry: 1962, 1964, 1969, 1972). Indeed, his first expression of such collaboration in 1962, preceded by four years the official founding of EAT (Experiments in Art and Technology, USA) in 1966.

During the First Machine Age, prior to World War II, enthusiasm for technological advances was expressed by the Machine Aesthetic which heralded the Modern Movement (Banham 1960). Affiliated art movements of this time which shared aspects of the Machine Aesthetic included: Purism in France, Futurism in Italy (both of which celebrated the glories of modern machines and the excitement of speed), Suprematism, Productivism in Russia, Constructivism, Precisionism in North America and kinetic sculpture (Meecham and Sheldon 2000).

By the 1960s, in the Second Machine Age, technology provided not only the inspiration for art production but above all its tools (Popper 1993), as reflected by the Art and Technology movement in the United States. Adherents to this movement employed only the very latest available computer equipment. In this early phase of computer art, programmers became artists and artists became programmers to experiment with the computer's creative possibilities (Darley, 1990). Since Henry worked in comparative artistic and scientific isolation, he did not have access to the latest technological innovations, in contrast to those working, for example, at the Massachusetts Institute of Technology (O'Hanrahan 2005).

By the 1970s, the earlier enthusiasm for technology witnessed in the 60s gave way to the post-modern loss of faith in technology as its destructive effects, both in war and on the environment, became more apparent (Lucie-Smith 1980). Goodman (1987) suggests that it is since 1978 that a second generation of computer artists may be recognised; a generation which no longer needs to be electronically knowledgeable or adept because the "software does it for them" (Goodman 1987, p. 47). This is in contrast to Henry who had to acquire the necessary knowledge and skills to manipulate and modify the components of the bombsight computers in order to construct and operate the drawing machines (O'Hanrahan 2005).

During the 1980s, the application in computers of the microchip (developed by 1972) increased the affordability of a home computer and led to the development of interactive computer graphics programmes like Sketchpad and various Paintbox systems (Darley 1991). During this period, computer art gave way almost completely to computer graphics as the computer's imaging capabilities became exploited both industrially and commercially and moved into entertainment related spheres, e.g.: Pixar, Lucasfilm. (Goodman 1987) The computer once again became, for some, an undisputed artistic tool in its own right (Goodman 1987).

This renewed enthusiasm in the computer's artistic possibilities has been further reflected by the emergence towards the end of the twentieth century of various forms of cyber, virtual, or digital art, examples of which include algorithmic art and fractal art. By the twenty-first century, digitally produced and/or manipulated images came to be exhibited in galleries as veritable works of art in their own right (O'Hanrahan 2005).

== Legacy ==
Henry's drawing machines of the 1960s represent a remarkable innovation in the field of art and technology for a variety of reasons. Firstly, the bombsight analogue computer provided not only the inspiration but also the main tool for producing highly original visual effects (O'Hanrahan 2005). Secondly, his machines' reliance on a mechanics of chance, as opposed to pre-determined computer programmes, ensured the unrepeatable and unique quality of his infinitely varied machine-generated effects or "Machine Pollocks" as Henry called them. (O'Hanrahan 2005). Thirdly, the spontaneous, interactive potential of his drawing machines' modus operandi pre-empted by some twenty years this particular aspect of later computer graphic manipulation software (O'Hanrahan 2005). As a result, The drawing machines and their visual effects represent pioneering precursors to the Digital Art produced by today's computer software.

Finally, Henry was never artistically inspired by the graphic potential of the modern digital computer (O'Hanrahan 2005). He much preferred the direct interaction afforded by the clearly visible interconnecting mechanical components of the earlier analogue computer and as a consequence of his drawing machines also. This was in stark contrast to the invisible and indirect workings of the later digital computer: "the mechanical analogue computer, was a work of art in itself, involving a most beautiful arrangement of gears, belts, cams differentials and so on- it still retained in its working a visual attractiveness which has now vanished in the modern electronic counterpart; … I enjoyed seeing the machine work…". (Henry, 1972)

In view of these considerations, Henry's 1960's electro-mechanical drawing machines may be said to not only reflect the early experimental phase of Computer Art and computer graphics but to also provide an important artistic and technological link between two distinct ages of the twentieth century: the earlier Mechanical/Industrial Age and the later Electronic/Digital Age (O'Hanrahan 2005).

== See also ==
- Interactive art
- L.S. Lowry
- Fractal art
