= A. Michael Noll =

American engineer (born 1939)

- Born: 1939 (age 86–87); Newark, New Jersey, U.S.
- Education: Newark College of Engineering; Polytechnic Institute of New York University
- Engineering career
- Institutions: University of Southern California; New York University

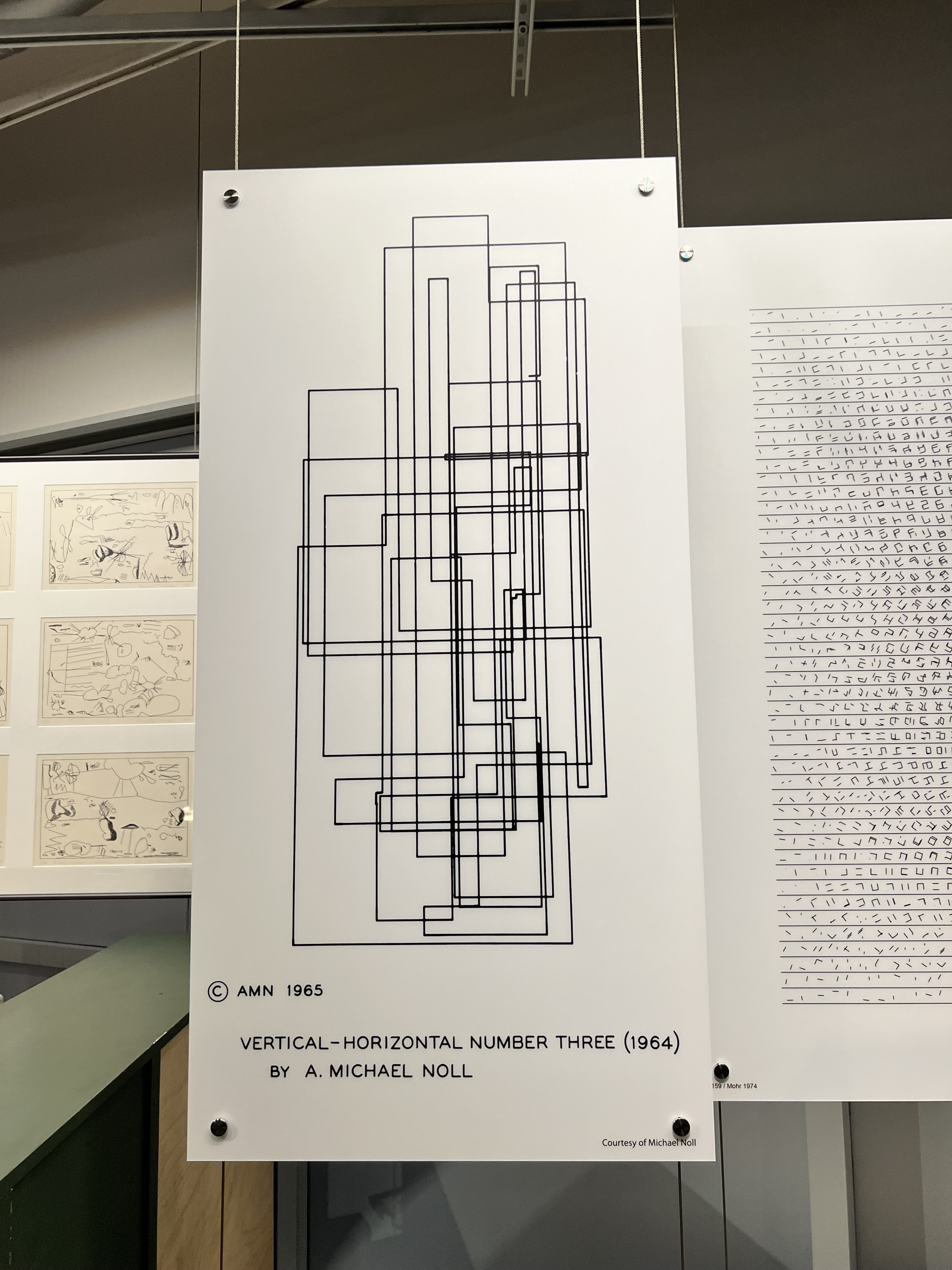
VERTICAL-HORIZONTAL NUMBER THREE (1964) BY A. MICHAEL NOLL. Computer History Museum, California

A. Michael Noll (born 1939, Newark, New Jersey) is an American engineer, and professor emeritus at the Annenberg School for Communication and Journalism at the University of Southern California. He served as dean of the Annenberg School from 1992 to 1994. He was a very early pioneer in digital computer art and 3D animation and tactile communication.

Noll created the first computer-rendered two-view stereoscopic 3D animations.

== Biography ==
Noll has a B.S.E.E. from Newark College of Engineering (now part of New Jersey Institute of Technology), an M.E.E. from New York University, and a Ph.D. in Electrical Engineering from the Polytechnic Institute of Brooklyn. He graduated from St. Benedict's Preparatory School in Newark, NJ, and after went down High Street to attend NCE.

Before joining the Annenberg School for Communication, Noll had a varied career in basic research, telecommunication marketing, and science policy. He worked in the AT&T Consumer Products and Marketing Department where he performed technical evaluations and identified opportunities for new products and services, such as teleconferencing and videotex.

He was Director of Technology Research and a Senior Affiliated Research Fellow at the Columbia Institute for Tele-information at Columbia University's Business School. He was affiliated with the Media Center at New York Law School, was a senior advisor to the Marconi Society, and was an adjunct faculty member of the Interactive Telecommunications Program at New York University's Tisch School of the Arts. He was an associate of the Quello Center at Michigan State University.

In the early 1970s, Noll was on the staff of the President's Science Advisor at the White House and was involved with such issues as computer security and privacy, computer exports, scientific and technical information, and educational technology.

From 1992 to 1994, Noll was dean of the USC Annenberg School for Communication for an interim period. During this time he formulated a broader vision of communication that resulted in a merger of USC academic units that study communication. He joined the faculty of the Annenberg School as a professor of communications in 1984 and became emeritus in 2006.

The electrical-engineering honor society Eta Kappa Nu awarded him Honorable Mention as an Outstanding Young Electrical Engineer in 1970.

== Work ==
Bell Labs in the early 1960s was extremely pioneering in the beginnings of digital computer art (A. Michael Noll), digital computer animation (Edward E. Zajac, Frank Sinden, and Kenneth C. Knowlton), and digital computer music (Max V. Mathews and John R. Pierce).

Noll spent nearly fifteen years performing basic research at Bell Labs in Murray Hill, New Jersey in such areas as the effects of media on interpersonal communication, three-dimensional computer graphics and animation, human-machine tactile communication, speech signal processing, cepstrum pitch determination, and aesthetics.

Noll used a digital computer to create artistic patterns and formalized the use of random and algorithmic processes in the creation of visual arts. His initial digital computer art was programmed in the summer of 1962 at Bell Telephone Laboratories in Murray Hill, NJ, making him one of the early innovators of digital computer art.

In 1965 Noll, along with two other pioneers within the field of early computer art, Frieder Nake and Georg Nees in Germany, exhibited publicly their computer art. During April 1965, the Howard Wise Gallery in New York City exhibited Noll's computer art along with random-dot patterns by Bela Julesz. Later in 1965, Noll's digital computer art was exhibited along with the analogue computer art of Maughan Mason at the Fall Joint Computer conference in Las Vegas. Noll proposed in the 1960s that the digital computer might become a creative artistic medium. All of his digital art was programmed in FORTRAN and FORTRAN subroutine packages that he wrote.

Salvador Dali incorporated one of Noll’s computer-generated, 3D stereoscopic, random, virtual sculptures into his stereoscopic pair of paintings “The Sleeping Smoker” (cc. 1972-73). Somehow Dali saw and was influenced by Noll’s works, possibly in a 1971 book edited by Jasia Reichardt.

In the late 1960s and early 1970s, Noll constructed interactive three-dimensional input devices and displays and a three-dimensional, tactile, force-feedback ("feelie") device (US patent 3,919,691 "Tactile Man-Machine Communications System" filed May 26, 1971, issued November 1, 1975). This device was the forerunner of today's virtual-reality systems, and Noll suggested its use as a way for the blind to "feel" computer graphics. He also demonstrated the potential of scanned raster displays for computer graphics. He was an early pioneer in the creation of stereoscopic computer-animated movies of four-dimensional hyper-objects, of a computer-generated ballet, and of computer-animated title sequences for TV and film.

His experiment comparing a computer-generated pattern with a painting by Mondrian was an early implementation of the Turing Test and an example of the use of digital computers in investigations of aesthetics.

== Noll archives ==
Noll's papers and works are at the NYU Dibner Library, the Huntington Library, the Los Angeles County Museum of Art, the Victoria and Albert Museum, the Museum of Modern Art, the Pompidue Musée national d’art moderne, Buffalo AKG Art Museum, ZKM Center for Art and Media, and other institutions.

== Publications ==
Noll has published over ninety professional papers, has been granted six patents, and is the author of ten books on various aspects of telecommunications, communications, and Bell Telephone Laboratories.

He has been a regular contributor of opinion and columnist pieces to newspapers and trade magazines with over 150 published. He has been quoted frequently about telecommunications and the telecommunication industry by the media. He has been a reviewer of classical music performances for the Classical New Jersey Society.
