= Reinhard Döhl =

German writer and scholar (1934–2004)

Reinhard Döhl (16 September 1934 – 29 May 2004) was a German writer and scholar in the fields of literature and media studies, also remembered as a poet and artist.

Though chiefly associated with his actual name, he also worked under the pseudonym Traugott Schneider.

== Biography ==
Reinhard Döhl was born on 16 September 1934 in the small western town of Wattenscheid, Province of Westphalia (now part of the city of Bochum, North Rhine-Westphalia). His formal education began with primary schooling in Göttingen in the early 1940s.

Döhl's preparation to enter the world of scholarship continued with studies in Germanistics, philosophy, history, and political science at the University of Göttingen, where he enrolled at the end of the 1950s after a period of studying, traveling, and working in the preceding years.

Döhl's life as a university student afforded new opportunities for self-expression, but his creative ambitions as a student were not without controversy or consequences. Soon after Döhl's poem "Missa profana", a profane Mass ridiculing the Agnus Dei, was published in June 1959, he was indicted for prosecution on account of this work after two Hanover students complained to the authorities. Prosecuted on charges of blasphemy, he was initially convicted and sentenced to spend ten days in prison and pay a 100-Deutsche Mark fine, but was eventually acquitted of the blasphemy accusation after appealing.

Having subsequently transferred to the University of Stuttgart in 1960, he was awarded his academic doctorate for Das literarische Werk Hans Arps 1903-1923. Zur poetischen Vorstellungswelt des Dadaismus, a highly esteemed examination of Hans Arp and Dadaism. The study of radio drama was another academic area of Döhl's interest and expertise. Employed as a professor of Germanistics by the University of Stuttgart, he taught abroad as a visiting professor at various times. Döhl was awarded his Habilitation with the completion Neuere deutsche Literatur unter besonderer Berücksichtigung der Medien in 1979.

Döhl's reputation outside academia was primarily built on the basis of his works as an innovator in poetry and art, although he also wrote some prose and short theatrical pieces. As a poet, Döhl is best known for his concrete poetry: the 1965 "Apfel" ("Apple"), a concrete poem in the shape of an apple which is composed of repeating instances of the word "apple" and one instance of the word "worm," is often discussed as a notable example of concrete poetry from the 20th century. Döhl's works of visual art have been displayed at various exhibitions of contemporary art. Döhl sometimes worked alongside painter Günther C. Kirchberger in the 1960s (when both were part of a close-knit Stuttgart group of artists and writers encouraged by Max Bense) and in the 1980s.

He died in Stuttgart on 29 May 2004.
