= Computer art =

Art genre

Computer art is art in which computers play a role in the production or display of the artwork. Such art can be an image, sound, animation, video, CD-ROM, DVD-ROM, video game, website, algorithm, performance or gallery installation. Many traditional disciplines are now integrating digital technologies and, as a result, the lines between traditional works of art and new media works created using computers have been blurred. For instance, an artist may combine traditional painting with algorithm art and other digital techniques. Defining computer art by its end product can therefore be difficult. Computer art is bound to change over time since changes in technology and software directly affect what is possible.

== Origin of the term ==
On the title page of the magazine Computers and Automation, January 1963, Edmund Berkeley published a picture by Efraim Arazi from 1962, coining for it the term "computer art." This picture inspired him to initiate the first Computer Art Contest in 1963. The annual contest was a key point in the development of computer art up to the year 1973.

== History ==
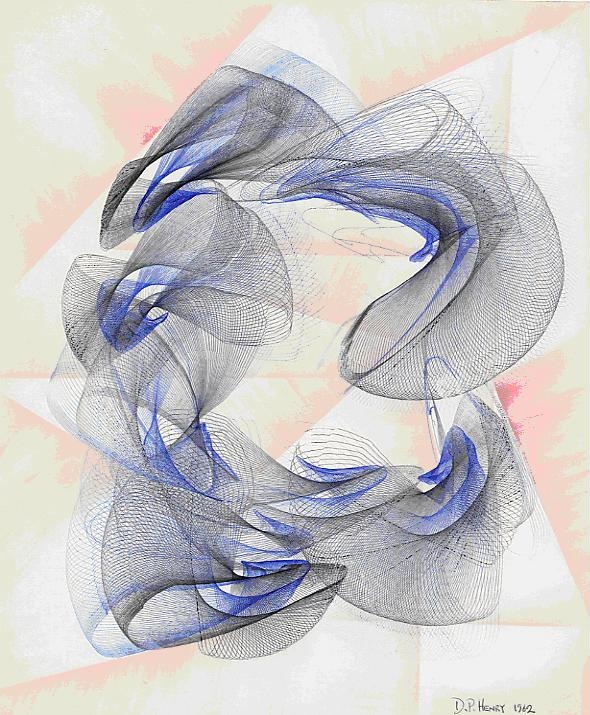
Desmond Paul Henry, picture by Drawing Machine 1, c. 1962

The precursor of computer art dates back to 1956–1958, with the generation of what is probably the first image of a human being on a computer screen, a (George Petty-inspired) pin-up girl at a SAGE air defense installation. Desmond Paul Henry created his first electromechanical Henry Drawing Machine in 1961, using an adapted analogue Bombsight Computer. His drawing machine-generated artwork was shown at the Reid Gallery in London in 1962 after his traditional, non-machine artwork won him the privilege of a one-man exhibition there. It was artist L.S.Lowry who encouraged Henry to include examples of his machine-generated art in the Reid Gallery exhibition.

By the mid-1960s, most individuals involved in the creation of computer art were in fact engineers and scientists because they had access to the only computing resources available at university scientific research labs. Many artists tentatively began to explore the emerging computing technology for use as a creative tool. In the summer of 1962, A. Michael Noll programmed a digital computer at Bell Telephone Laboratories in Murray Hill, New Jersey to generate visual patterns solely for artistic purposes. His later computer-generated patterns simulated paintings by Piet Mondrian and Bridget Riley and became classics. Noll also used the patterns to investigate aesthetic preferences in the mid-1960s.

The two early exhibitions of computer art were held in 1965: Generative Computergrafik, February 1965, at the Technische Hochschule in Stuttgart, Germany, and Computer-Generated Pictures, April 1965, at the Howard Wise Gallery in New York. The Stuttgart exhibit featured work by Georg Nees; the New York exhibit featured works by Bela Julesz and A. Michael Noll and was reviewed as art by The New York Times. A third exhibition was put up in November 1965 at Galerie Wendelin Niedlich in Stuttgart, Germany, showing works by Frieder Nake and Georg Nees. Analogue computer art by Maughan Mason along with digital computer art by Noll were exhibited at the AFIPS Fall Joint Computer Conference in Las Vegas toward the end of 1965.

In 1968, the Institute of Contemporary Arts (ICA) in London hosted one of the most influential early exhibitions of computer art called Cybernetic Serendipity. The exhibition, curated by Jasia Reichardt, included many of those often regarded as the first digital artists, Nam June Paik, Frieder Nake, Leslie Mezei, Georg Nees, A. Michael Noll, John Whitney, and Charles Csuri. One year later, the Computer Arts Society was founded, also in London.

At the time of the opening of Cybernetic Serendipity, in August 1968, a symposium was held in Zagreb, Yugoslavia, under the title "Computers and visual research". It took up the European artists movement of New Tendencies that had led to three exhibitions (in 1961, 63, and 65) in Zagreb of concrete, kinetic, and constructive art as well as op art and conceptual art. New Tendencies changed its name to "Tendencies" and continued with more symposia, exhibitions, a competition, and an international journal (bit international) until 1973.

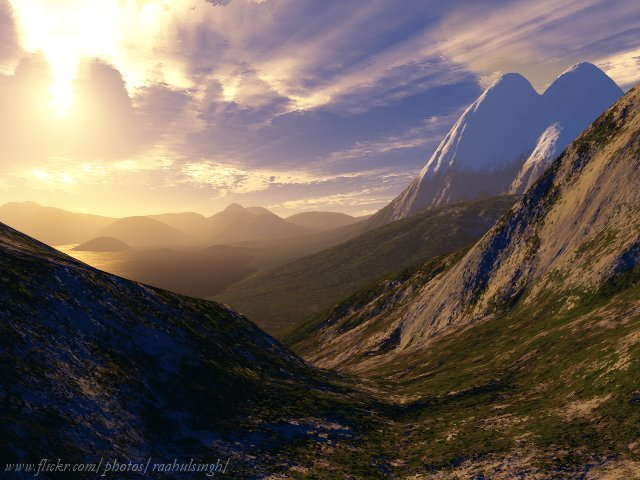
A computer-generated fractal landscape

Katherine Nash and Richard Williams published Computer Program for Artists: ART 1 in 1970.

Xerox Corporation's Palo Alto Research Center (PARC) designed the first Graphical User Interface (GUI) in the 1970s. The first Macintosh computer was released in 1984; since then the GUI became popular. Many graphic designers quickly accepted its capacity as a creative tool.

Andy Warhol created digital art using an Amiga when the computer was publicly introduced at the Lincoln Center, New York in July 1985. An image of Debbie Harry was captured in monochrome from a video camera and digitized into a graphics program called ProPaint. Warhol manipulated the image adding colour by using flood fills.

== Output devices ==
Formerly, technology restricted output and print results. Early machines used pen-and-ink plotters to produce basic hard copy.

In the early 1960s, the Stromberg Carlson SC-4020 microfilm printer was used at Bell Telephone Laboratories as a plotter to produce digital computer art and animation on 35-mm microfilm. Still images were drawn on the face plate of the cathode ray tube and automatically photographed. A series of still images were drawn to create a computer-animated movie, early on a roll of 35-mm film and then on 16-mm film as a 16-mm camera was later added to the SC-4020 printer.

In the 1970s, the dot matrix printer (which uses a print head hitting an ink ribbon somewhat like a typewriter) was used to reproduce varied fonts and arbitrary graphics. The first animations were created by plotting all still frames sequentially on a stack of paper, with motion transfer to 16-mm film for projection. During the 1970s and 1980s, dot matrix printers were used to produce most visual output while microfilm plotters were used for most early animation.

In 1976, the inkjet printer was invented with the increase in the use of personal computers. The inkjet printer is now the cheapest and most versatile option for everyday digital color output. Raster Image Processing (RIP) is typically built into the printer or supplied as a software package for the computer; it is required to achieve the highest quality output. Basic inkjet devices do not feature RIP. Instead, they rely on graphic software to rasterize images. The laser printer, though more expensive than the inkjet, is another affordable output device available today.

== Graphic software ==
Adobe Systems, founded in 1982, developed the PostScript language and digital fonts, making drawing, painting, and image manipulation software popular. Adobe Illustrator, a vector drawing program based on the Bézier curve introduced in 1987 and Adobe Photoshop, written by brothers Thomas and John Knoll in 1990 were developed for use on MacIntosh computers, and compiled for DOS/Windows platforms by 1993.

== Robot painting ==
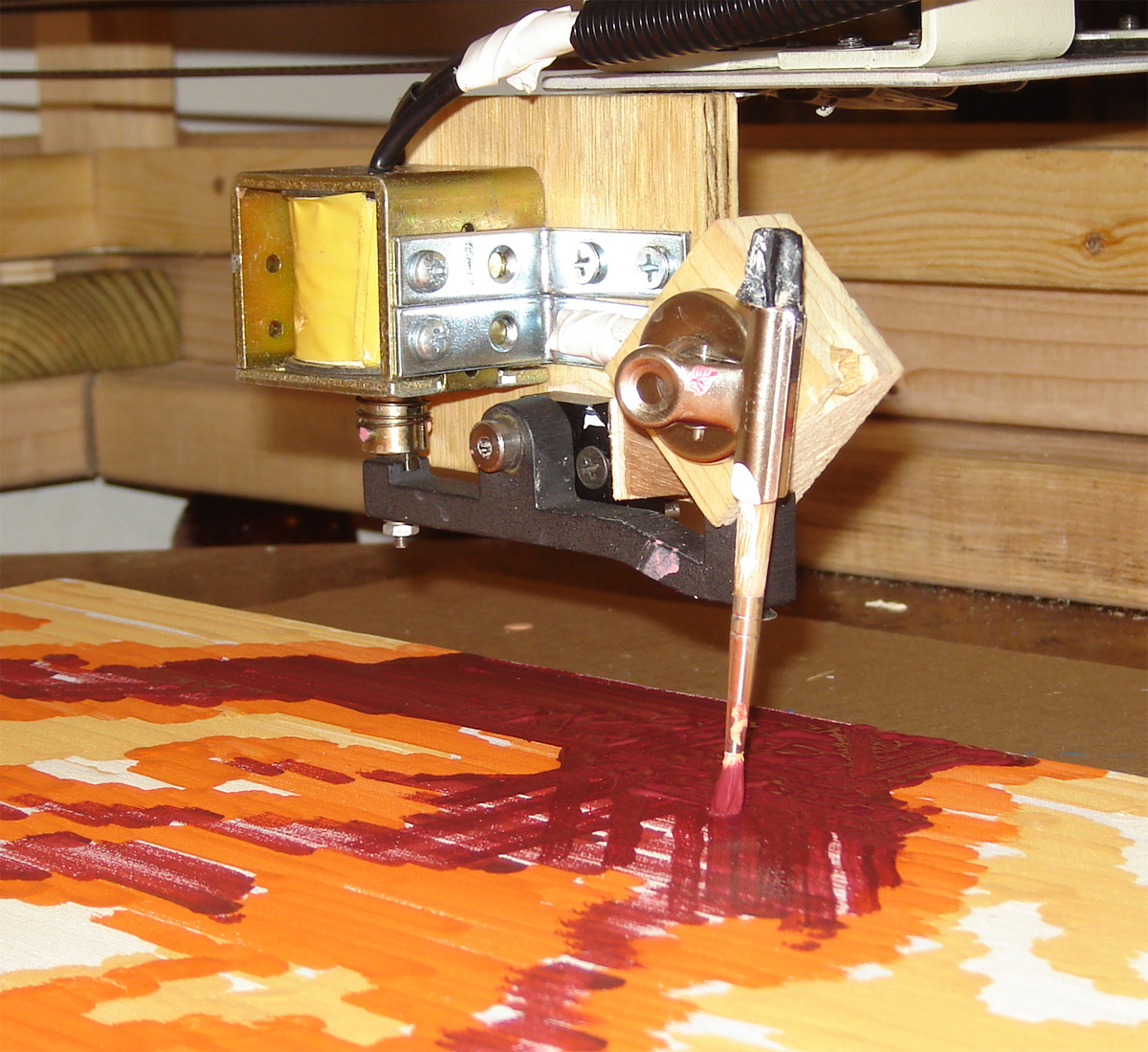
A robotic brush head painting on a canvas

A robot painting is an artwork painted by a robot. Raymond Auger's Painting Machine, made in 1962, was one of the first robotic painters as was AARON, an artificial intelligence/artist developed by Harold Cohen beginning in the late 1960s. Joseph Nechvatal began making large computer-robotic paintings in 1986. Artist Ken Goldberg created an 11' x 11' painting machine in 1992 and German artist Matthias Groebel also built his own robotic painting machine in the early 1990s.

== Neural style transfer ==
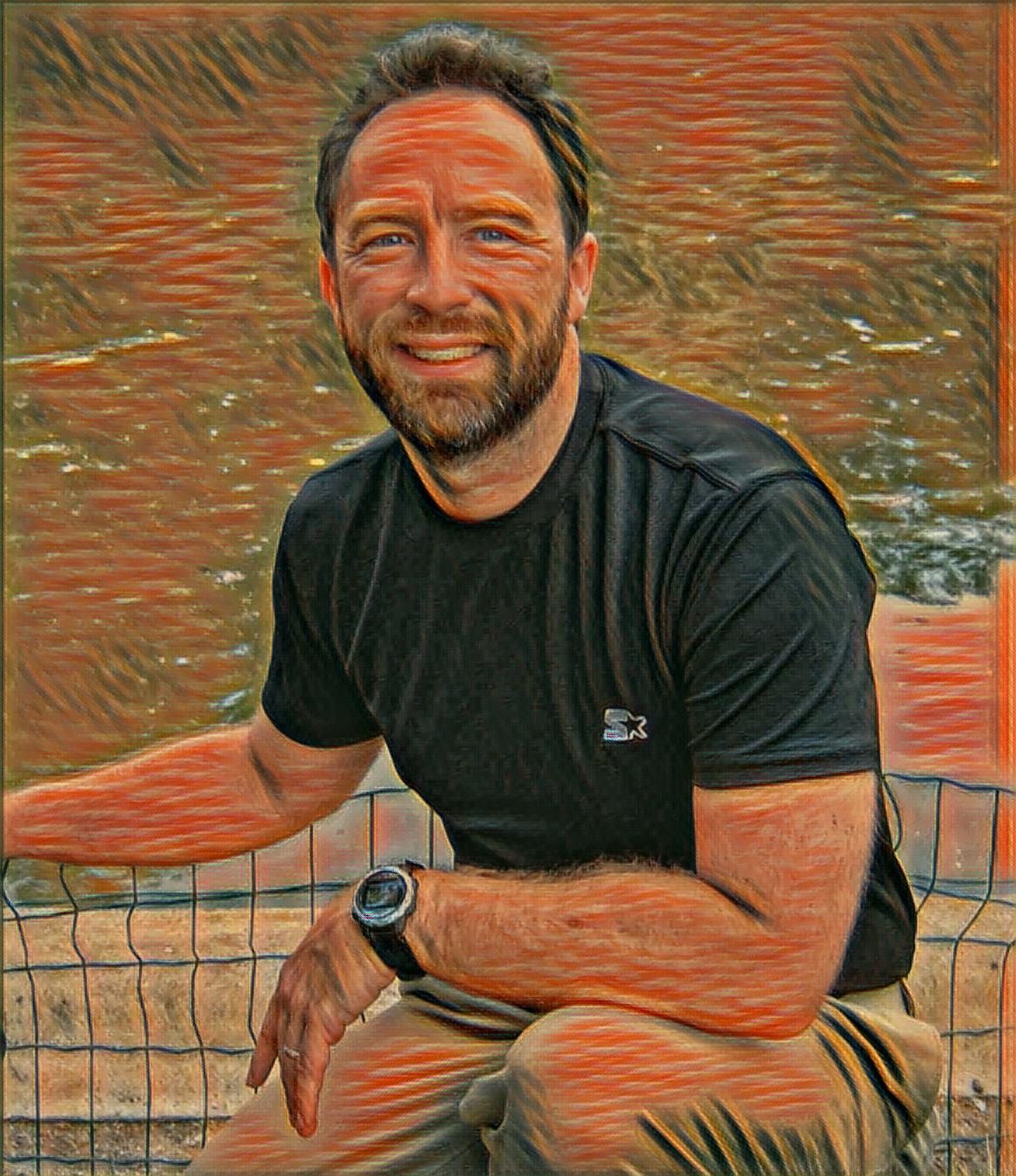
A photo of Jimmy Wales rendered in the style of The Scream using neural style transfer

Non-photorealistic rendering (using computers to automatically transform images into stylized art) has been a subject of research since the 1990s. Around 2015, neural style transfer using convolutional neural networks to transfer the style of an artwork onto a photograph or other target image became feasible. One method of style transfer involves using a framework such as VGG or ResNet to break the artwork style down into statistics about visual features. The target photograph is subsequently modified to match those statistics. Notable applications include Prisma, Facebook Caffe2Go style transfer, MIT's Nightmare Machine, and DeepArt.

== AI generated art ==
With the rise of AI image generators such as DALL-E 2, Flux, Midjourney, and others, there is an area of AI generated art. There is much controversy and debate over whether AI generated art is actual art.

== See also ==
- 3D printing art
- Algorithm art
- Artificial intelligence art
- ASCII art
- Digital painting
- Digital art
- Fractal art
- Generative art
- Glitch art
- Internet art
- List of mathematical art software
- New media art
- Software art
- Systems art
- Video game art / Modding
