= Elisabeth Walther-Bense =

German semiotician

- Born: Elisabeth Walther; 10 August 1922 (age 104); Oberweißbach, State of Thuringia, Weimar Republic
- Died: 10 January 2018 (aged 95); Stuttgart, Baden-Württemberg, Germany
- Spouse: Max Bense (m. 1988; died 1990)

Academic background
- Education: Stuttgart Institute of Technology
- Thesis: Die Rolle der Logik von Port Royal in der Frühgeschichte der exakten Wissenschaften (1950)
- Doctoral advisor: Max Bense

Academic work
- Discipline: Semiotics
- Main interests: Port-Royal Logic
- Website: elisabeth-walther-bense.de

Elisabeth Walther-Bense (née Walther) was a German semiotician. She also worked as a publicist, editor, and translator.

== Biography ==
=== Early life and education ===
Walther-Bense was born on 10 August 1922 in Oberweißbach, Thuringia, Germany. In 1950, She earned her doctorate at the Stuttgart Institute of Technology under Max Bense, where she wrote her dissertation Die Rolle der Logik von Port Royal in der Frühgeschichte der exakten Wissenschaften (transl. The Role Of Port-Royal Logic In The Early History of The Exact Sciences).

=== Career ===
Walther-Bense taught at the Stuttgart Institute of Technology (from 1967, the University of Stuttgart) from 1956 to 1983. She was the first woman to hold a professorship at the University's Department of Systematic Philosophy. Along with her husband Bense, she also taught at the Ulm School of Design and the Escola Superior de Desenho Industrial at UERJ.

She was a significant co-contributor with Bense to work on art, design, and semiotics as influenced by information and control systems theory emerging at the time, and documented much of his work in Germany and Brazil.

Walther-Bense was the editor of the journal Augenblick (1955-1960), co-editor of Rot (1960–90) and co-editor of Semiosis (1976-1990), which she co-founded with Bense.

=== Personal life ===
Walther married her employer and colleague Bense in 1988.

== Major works ==
With Bense, she co-authored Wörterbuch der Semiotik (transl. Dictionary of Semiotics) in 1973. Her 1974 work Allgemeine Zeichenlehre (transl. General Theory of Signs) helped to make Charles Sanders Peirce's work accessible in Germany. She later published Charles Sanders Peirce Leben und Werk in 1989.
