= Frieder Nake =

German mathematician and computer scientist

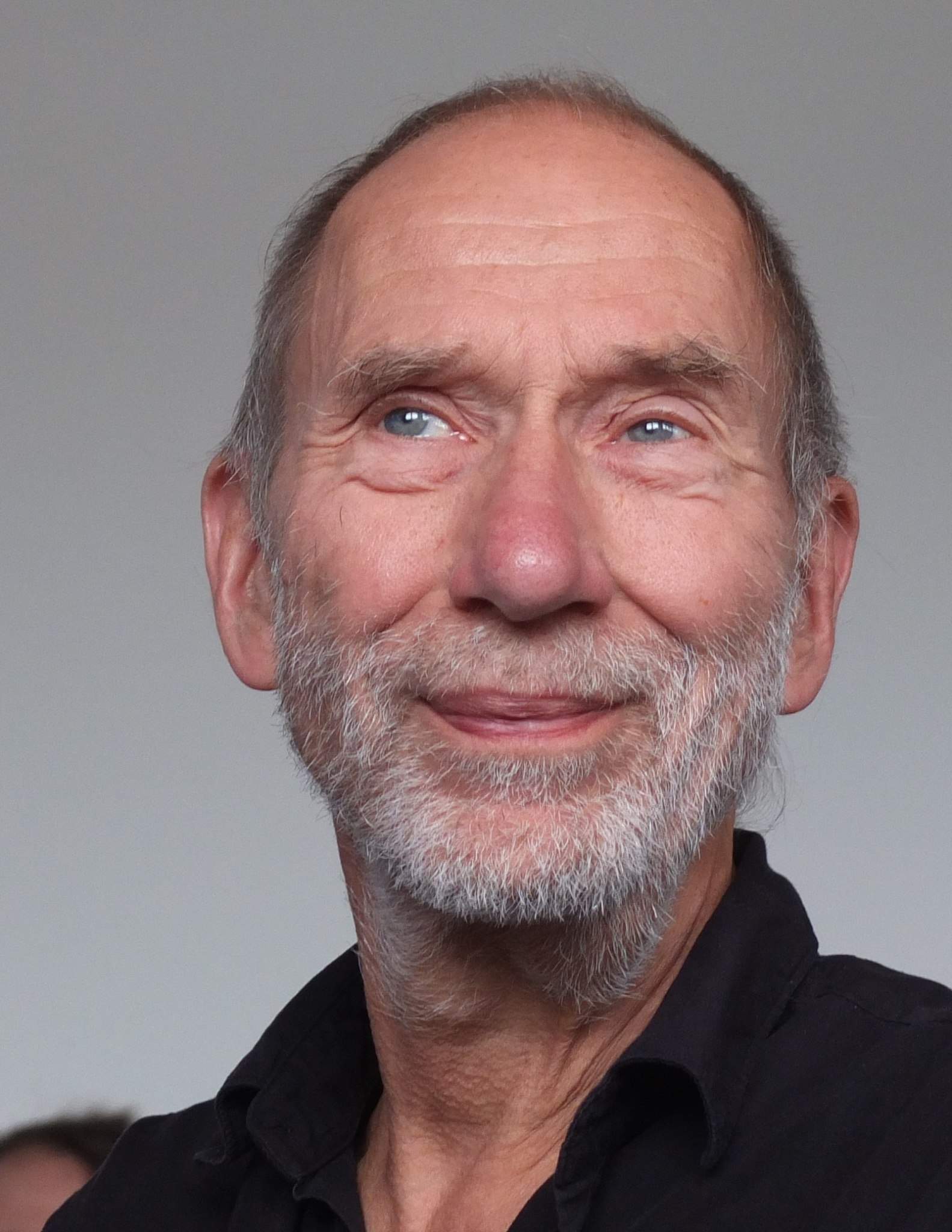
- Nake in 2012
- Born: December 16, 1938 (age 87); Stuttgart, Germany
- Education: University of Stuttgart
- Occupations: Mathematician, computer artist

Frieder Nake (born December 16, 1938) is a mathematician, computer scientist, and pioneer of computer art. He is best known internationally for his contributions to the earliest manifestations of computer art, a field of computing that made its first public appearances with three small exhibitions in 1965.

== Art career ==
Nake had his first exhibition at Galerie Wendelin Niedlich in Stuttgart in November, 1965 alongside the artist Georg Nees.

Until 1969, Nake generated in rapid sequence a large number of works that he showed in many exhibitions over the years. He estimates his production at about 300 to 400 works during those years. A few were limited screenprint editions, single pieces and portfolios. The bulk were done as China ink on paper graphics, carried out by a flatbed high precision plotter called the Zuse Graphomat Z64.

Nake participated in the important group shows of the 1960s, such as, most prominently, Cybernetic Serendipity (London, UK, 1968), Tendencies 4: Computers and Visual Research (Zagreb, Yugoslavia, 1968), Ricerca e Progettazione. Proposte per una esposizione sperimentale (35th Venice Biennale, Italy, 1970), Arteonica (São Paulo, Brazil, 1971).

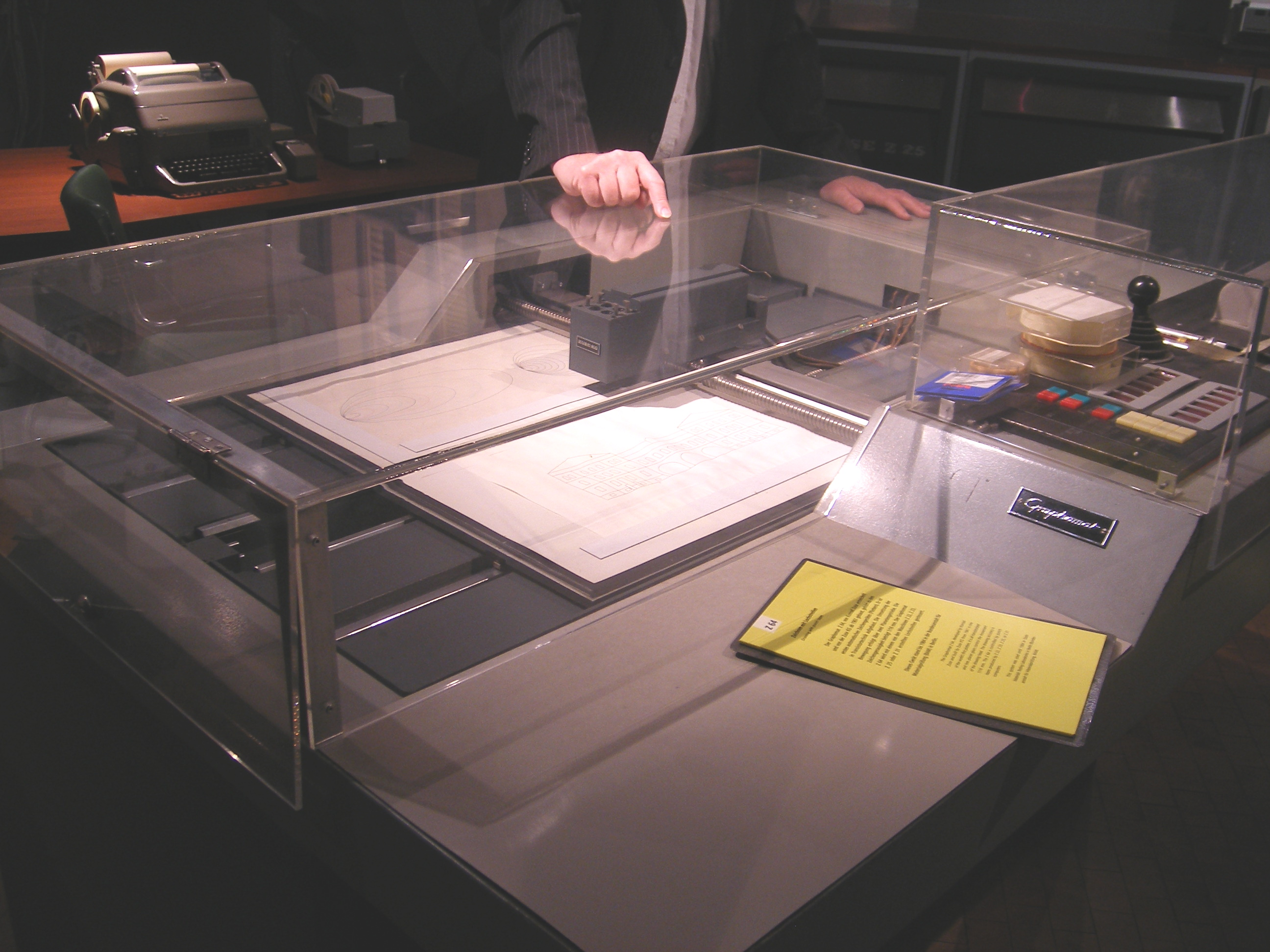
A Konrad Zuse Z64 Graphomat plotter, the model that Nake used for his work in the 1960s

In 1971, he wrote a short and provocative note for Page, the Bulletin of the Computer Arts Society (whose member he was and still is), under the title „There Should Be No Computer-Art“ (Page No. 18, Oct. 1971, p. 1-2. Reprinted in Arie Altena, Lucas van der Velden (eds.): The anthology of computer art. Amsterdam: Sonic Acts 2006, p. 59-60). The note sparked a lively controversial debate among those who had meanwhile started to build an active community of artists, writers, musicians, and designers in the digital domain. His statement was rooted in a moral position. The involvement of computer technology in the Vietnam War and in massive attempts by capital to automate productive processes and, thereby, generate unemployment, should not allow artists to close their eyes and become silent servants of the ruling classes by reconciling high technology with the masses of the poor and suppressed.

His book Ästhetik als Informationsverarbeitung (1974) is one of the first to study connections between aesthetics, computing, and information theory, which has become important to the transdisciplinary area of digital media. This book and many of his ca. 300 publications (2012) evince his intellectual position between science and the humanities – a position that has always included an element of concern regarding the threats to a fully human society represented by computer technology, and which concern is on full display in a summary interview focused on what he describes as the "Algorithmic Revolution".

== Academic career ==
Frieder Nake has been a professor of interactive computer graphics at the Department of Computer Science at Bremen, Germany, since 1972. Since 2005, he has also been teaching digital media design there. After studying mathematics at the University of Stuttgart, where he earned his diploma and doctoral degrees (in probability theory), he has taught in Stuttgart, Toronto and Vancouver, before coming to Bremen. His courses and seminars, besides computer graphics, interactivity, and digital media, are in the areas of computer art, aesthetics, semiotics, computers and society, and theory of computing. He has been a visiting professor to Universitetet Oslo, Aarhus Universitet, Universität Wien, Danube University Krems, University of Colorado, University of Lübeck, University of Basel, University of Costa Rica, Xi'an University of Science and Technology and Tongji University.

== Awards ==
He won the First Prize of the Computer Art Contest of Computers & Automation in 1966. In 1997, his teaching work was honored by the Berninghausen Award for Excellence and Innovation in Teaching (University of Bremen).

== Public collections ==
- Abteiberg Museum, Mönchengladbach, Germany
- Kunsthalle Bremen, Germany
- Mary and Leigh Block Museum of Art, Evanston Illinois
- Museum of Contemporary Art, Zagreb, Croatia
- Musée national des beaux-arts du Québec
- Sprengel Museum, Hannover, Germany
- Tama Art University Museum, Tokyo, Japan
- Tate Gallery, London
- Victoria and Albert Museum, London
