= Max Bense =

German philosopher (1910–1990)

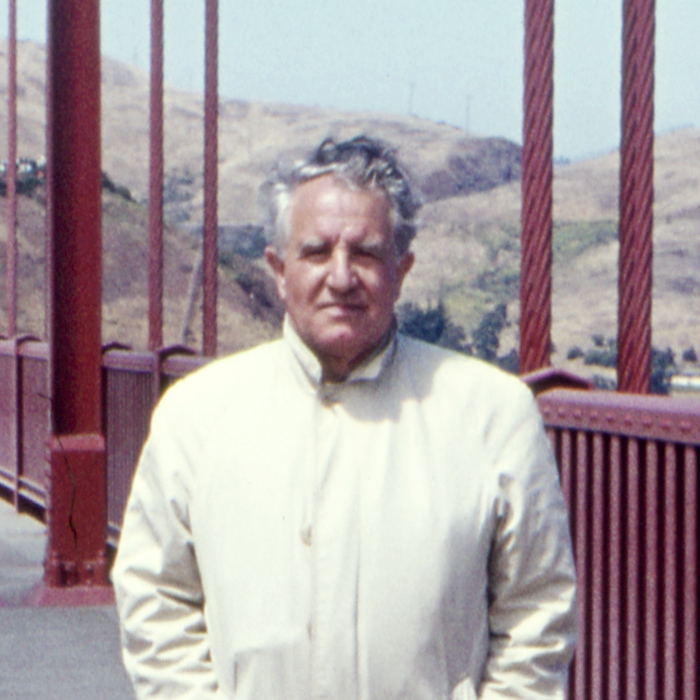
- Portrait of Bense on the Golden Gate Bridge, 1969
- Born: Max Otto Bense; 7 February 1910 (age 116); Straßburg, Alsace-Lorraine, German Empire
- Died: 29 April 1990 (aged 80); Stuttgart, Baden-Württemberg, West Germany
- Spouse: Elisabeth Walther-Bense (m. 1988)

Academic background
- Education: University of Bonn
- Thesis: Quantenmechanik und Daseinsrelativität (1937)
- Doctoral advisor: Oskar Becker

Academic work
- Discipline: Philosophy

Max Bense (7 February 1910 in Straßburg – 29 April 1990 in Stuttgart) was a German philosopher, writer, and publicist, known for his work in philosophy of science, logic, aesthetics, and semiotics. His thoughts combine natural sciences, art, and philosophy under a collective perspective and follow a definition of reality, which – under the term existential rationalism – is able to remove the separation between humanities and natural sciences.

== Life ==
Bense spent his early childhood in his birthplace, Straßburg, but in 1918 his family was deported from Alsace-Lorraine as a consequence of World War I. Starting in 1920, he attended grammar school in Cologne and after 1930 he studied physics, chemistry, mathematics, geology, and philosophy at the University of Bonn. During his studies, his interest in literature is revealed by several contributions to newspapers, journals, and broadcast, for which he wrote several radio dramas. In 1937 he received his doctor's degree (Dr. phil. nat.) with his dissertation Quantenmechanik und Daseinsrelativität (transl. Quantum Mechanics and Relativity of Dasein). He used the term Relativity of Dasein, which he adopted from Max Scheler, for explaining that novel theories do not have to contradict classical science. Bense, a declared opponent of national socialism, knowingly opposed the Deutsche Physik of the Nazi regime (cf. Johannes Juilfs), which rejected the theory of relativity due to Einstein's Jewish origin. Therefore, he did not receive his postdoctoral qualification.

In 1938, Bense initially worked as a physicist at the Bayer AG in Leverkusen. After the outbreak of World War II he was a soldier, firstly as a meteorologist, then as a medical technician in Berlin and Georgenthal, where he was mayor for a short time after the end of the war. In 1945 the University of Jena appointed him to curator (Chancellor of the University) and offered him the possibility of postdoctoral work (habilitation), which was likely to be cumulative, at the Social-Pedagogic Faculty, which was followed by an appointment to Professor extraordinarius of philosophical and scientific propaedeutics.

In 1948, Bense fled from the political development of the Soviet occupation zone to Boppard; and he was appointed as a guest professor in philosophy and theory of science by the University of Stuttgart in 1949, and as senior lecturer (associate professor) there in 1950. In 1955, Bense raised a controversy concerning mythologizing tendencies of German postwar culture. Thereupon he became the target of public polemics, resulting in a postponement of his appointment to full professor until 1963.

In addition, he worked at the adult education center in Ulm and at the Ulm School of Design from 1953 to 1958.

He was also guest professor at the Hamburg College for Visual Arts from 1958 to 1960 and in 1966/67.

Max Bense became professor emeritus on 7 February 1978 and died in 1990 as an internationally accredited scientist.

Bense married his employee and colleague Elisabeth Walther in 1988.

== Philosophy ==
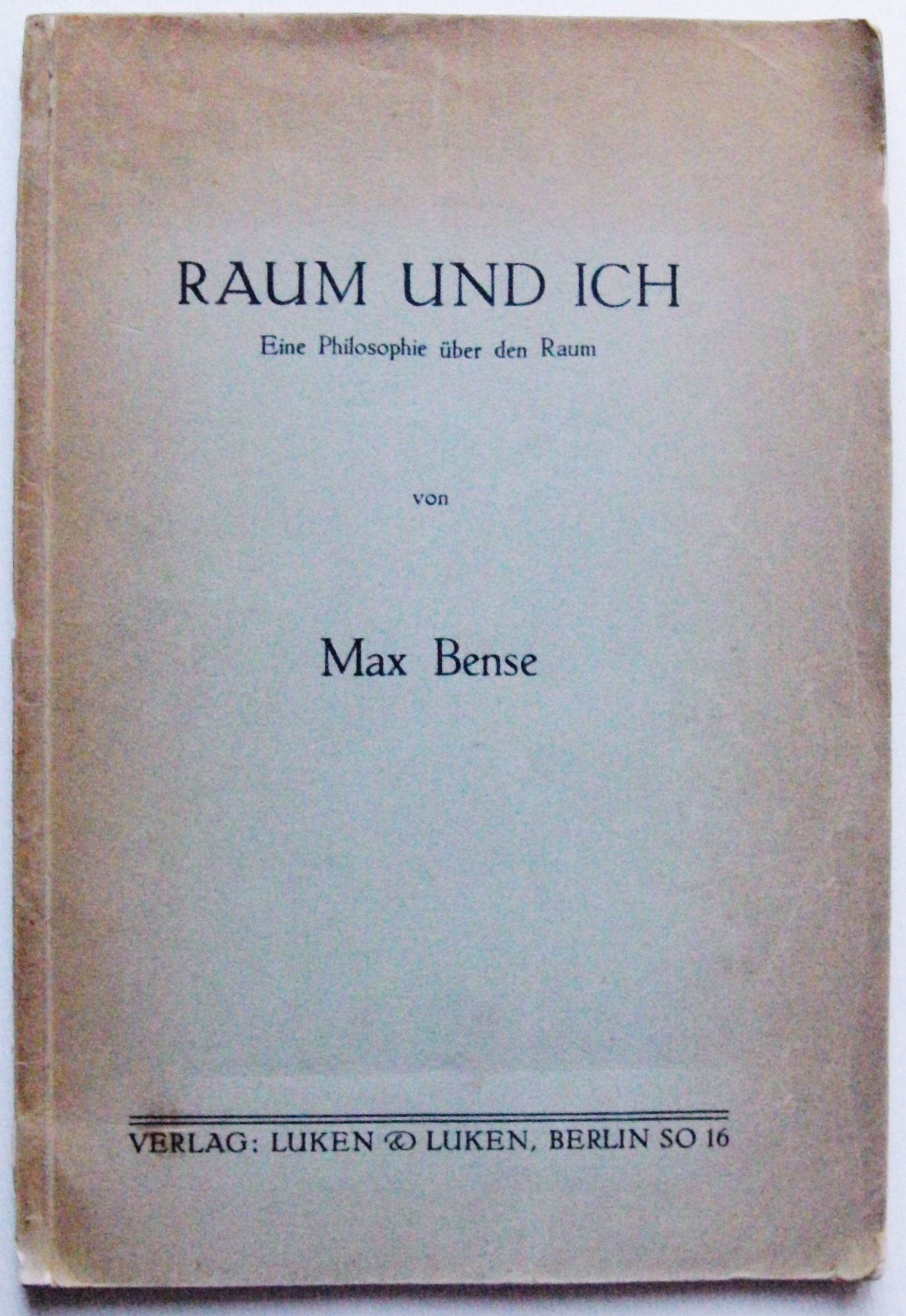
Raum und Ich, Bense's first publication (Berlin 1934)

=== Mathematics in art and language ===
Already in his first publication, Raum und Ich (transl. Space and Ego; 1934), Bense combined theoretical philosophy with mathematics, semiotics, and aesthetics; this remained his thematic emphasis. For the first time, he phrased a rational aesthetics, which defines the components of language – words, syllables, phonemes – as a statistical language repertoire, and which opposes literature that is based upon meaning. Conversely, Bense studied the concept of style, which he applied to mathematics – following Gottfried Wilhelm Leibniz' Mathesis Universalis –, designing a universal markup language. Die Mathematik in der Kunst (transl. Mathematics in Art; 1949) was his starting point for investigating mathematical principles of form in the history of art. From this, Bense developed a perspective to see the mathematical spirit in works of literary art, especially in metrics and rhythm. Bense's thoughts assumed the correlation of a mathematical and linguistic consciousness, which have a common origin and have grown into complementary modes of thought. He considered the atomistic structures of the linguistic modes to be equivalent. By using non-interpretable basic elements (characters) and rules or operators, these forms give meaning, impart information and make stylistically formed language possible. He considered the aesthetic and the semantic information to be generally separated and not to be defined until they are used. This was the first German integration of Ludwig Wittgenstein's work into the field of aesthetics.

Some of Bense's knowledge is based on the investigations of the American mathematician George David Birkhoff. Thus some termini like "redundancy" and "entropy" have to be equated with Ordnungsmaß and Materialverbrauch (consumption of material) from Birkhoff's aesthetics research.

=== Technology and ethics ===
Bense considered the destruction of the social and intellectual middle-class world since the beginning of the 20th century a parallel to the destruction of the concept of being in philosophy. He saw the natural world replaced by an artificial one. As a forerunner of the computer age, Bense thought about the technical counterparts of human existence; unlike many of his contemporaries he considered machines as pure products of human intelligence, having algorithms as a basis, but soon he posed ethical questions, which were not discussed in ethics of technology until decades later. His pragmatic views of technology, influenced by Walter Benjamin, which lacked either belief in progress or its rejection, brought him the criticism of Theodor W. Adorno – and again put him in the role of the opposition.

=== Structural analysis of language ===
Inspired by neuroscience, informatics, and the occupation with electronic calculating machines, but also by Wittgenstein's concept of the language-game, Bense tried to put into perspective or to extend the traditional view of literature. In that, he was one of the first philosophers of culture who integrated the technical possibilities of the computer into their thoughts and investigated them across disciplinary boundaries. He statistically and topologically analysed linguistic phenomena, subjected them to questions of semiotic, information theory, and communication theory using structuralistic approaches. Thus Bense became the first theoretician of concrete poetry, which was started by Eugen Gomringer in 1953, and encouraged e.g. Helmut Heißenbüttel, Claus Bremer, Reinhard Döhl, Ludwig Haring, and Franz Mon to perform further experiments, and also had influence on Ernst Jandl's language deconstruction (see also Stuttgarter Gruppe/Schule).

=== Discussion with writers ===
In his work with literature and literary language, Bense was not content with only theoretical considerations; he had close contact to authors like Alfred Andersch and Arno Schmidt. His constructions of analogy to visual arts made major contributions to the understanding of cubism and dadaism.

=== Understanding of science ===
As a theoretician of science, Bense represented the synthetic intellectual concept, where classical humanism and modern technology constructively complement one another. From this concept of science, he hoped for progressive knowledge, which must always be ethically scrutinized, and at the same time, for the prevention of regression. Because of that, Bense argued for enlightenment and put himself into that tradition.

After 1984 Max Bense applied his theories of visual art to screen media. Because of that, early thoughts of media studies concerning the internet, especially the concept of digital poetry, may be traced back to Bense.

== Publications ==
All publications are in German.

- Raum und Ich. Eine Philosophie über den Raum. Luken & Luken, Berlin 1934
- Aufstand des Geistes. Eine Verteidigung der Erkenntnis. Deutsche Verlags-Anstalt, Stuttgart 1935
- Anti-Klages oder Von der Würde des Menschen. Widerstands-Verlag (Anna Niekisch), Berlin 1937
- Kierkegaard-Brevier. Insel, Leipzig 1937
- Quantenmechanik und Daseinsrelativität. Eine Untersuchung über die Prinzipien der Quantenmechanik und ihre Beziehung zu Schelers Lehre von der Daseinsrelativität der Gegenstandsarten. Welzel, Cologne 1938
- Vom Wesen deutscher Denker oder Zwischen Kritik und Imperativ. Oldenbourg, Munich/Berlin 1938
- Die abendländische Leidenschaft oder Zur Kritik der Existenz. Oldenbourg, Munich/Berlin 1938
- Geist der Mathematik. Abschnitte aus der Philosophie der Arithmetik und Geometrie. Oldenbourg, Munich/Berlin 1939
- Aus der Philosophie der Gegenwart. Staufen, Cologne 1940
- Einleitung in die Philosophie. Eine Einübung des Geistes. Oldenbourg, Munich 1941
- Sören Kierkegaard. Leben im Geist. Hoffmann und Campe, Hamburg 1942
- Physikalische Welträtsel. Ein Buch von Atomen, Kernen, Strahlen und Zellen. Staufen, Cologne 1942
- Briefe großer Naturforscher und Mathematiker. Staufen, Cologne 1943
- Das Leben der Mathematiker. Bilder aus der Geistesgeschichte der Mathematik. Staufen, Cologne 1944
- Über Leibniz. Leibniz und seine Ideologie. Der geistige Mensch und die Technik. Rauch, Jena 1946
- Konturen einer Geistesgeschichte der Mathematik. Die Mathematik und die Wissenschaften. (2 volumes) Claassen & Goverts, Hamburg 1946-1949
- Philosophie als Forschung. Staufen, Cologne 1947
- Umgang mit Philosophen. Essays. Staufen, Cologne 1947
- Hegel und Kierkegaard. Eine prinzipielle Untersuchung. Staufen, Cologne 1948
- Von der Verborgenheit des Geistes. Habel, Berlin 1948
- Was ist Existenzphilosophie? Butzon & Bercker, Kevelaer 1949
- Moderne Naturphilosophie. Butzon & Bercker, Kevelaer 1949
- Technische Existenz. Essays. Deutsche Verlags-Anstalt, Stuttgart 1949
- Geschichte der Wissenschaften in Tabellen. Butzon&Bercker, Kevelaer 1949
- Literaturmetaphysik. Der Schriftsteller in der technischen Welt. Deutsche Verlags-Anstalt, Stuttgart 1950
- Ptolemäer und Mauretanier oder Die theologische Emigration der deutschen Literatur. Kiepenheuer & Witsch, Cologne/Berlin 1950
- Was ist Elektrizität? Butzon & Bercker, Kevelaer 1950
- Die Philosophie. Suhrkamp, Frankfurt/Main 1951
- Plakatwelt. Vier Essays. Deutsche Verlags-Anstalt, Stuttgart 1952
- Die Theorie Kafkas. Kiepenheuer & Witsch, Cologne/Berlin 1952
- Der Begriff der Naturphilosophie. Deutsche Verlags-Anstalt, Stuttgart 1953
- Aesthetica (I). Metaphysische Beobachtungen am Schönen. Deutsche Verlags-Anstalt, Stuttgart 1954
- Descartes und die Folgen (I). Ein aktueller Traktat. Agis, Krefeld/Baden-Baden 1955
- Aesthetica (II). Aesthetische Information. Agis, Baden-Baden 1956
- Rationalismus und Sensibilität. Präsentationen. (Mit Elisabeth Walther) Agis, Krefeld/Baden-Baden 1956
- Aesthetica (III). Ästhetik und Zivilisation. Theorie der ästhetischen Zivilisation. Agis, Krefeld/Baden-Baden 1958
- Kunst und Intelligenz als Problem der Moderne. Kulturamt, Dortmund 1959
- Aesthetica (IV). Programmierung des Schönen. Allgemeine Texttheorie und Textästhetik. Agis, Krefeld/Baden-Baden 1960
- Grignan-Serie. Beschreibung einer Landschaft. Der Augenblick, Stuttgart 1960
- Descartes und die Folgen (II). Ein Geräusch in der Straße. Agis, Krefeld/Baden-Baden 1960
- Die Idee der Politik in der technischen Welt. Kulturamt, Dortmund 1960
- aprèsfiche für uns hier und für andere von Max Bense. Werbung für „Rheinlandschaft“. Burkhardt, Stuttgart 1961
- Bestandteile des Vorüber. Dünnschliffe Mischtexte Montagen. Kiepenheuer & Witsch, Cologne 1961
- Rosenschuttplatz. (with Clytus Gottwald) Mayer, Stuttgart 1961
- Reste eines Gesichtes. (With Karl-Georg Pfahler). Mayer, Stuttgart 1961
- Entwurf einer Rheinlandschaft. Kiepenheuer & Witsch, Cologne/Berlin 1962
- theorie der texte. Eine Einführung in neuere Auffassungen und Methoden. Kiepenheuer & Witsch, Cologne 1962
- Die präzisen Vergnügen. Versuche und Modelle. Limes, Wiesbaden 1964
- Aesthetica. Einführung in die neue Aesthetik. Agis, Baden-Baden 1965
- Zufällige Wortereignisse. Mayer, Stuttgart 1965
- Brasilianische Intelligenz. Eine cartesianische Reflexion. Limes, Wiesbaden 1965
- jetzt. Mayer, Stuttgart 1965
- tallose berge. Mayer, Stuttgart 1965
- Ungehorsam der Ideen. Abschließender Traktat über Intelligenz und technische Welt. Kiepenheuer & Witsch, Cologne/Berlin 1965
- zusammenfassende grundlegung moderner ästhetik. galerie press, St. Gallen 1966
- Epische Studie zu einem epikureischen Doppelspiel. Hake, Cologne 1967
- Die Zerstörung des Durstes durch Wasser. Einer Liebesgeschichte zufälliges Textereignis. Kiepenheuer & Witsch, Cologne 1967
- Semiotik. Allgemeine Theorie der Zeichen. Agis, Baden-Baden 1967
- kleine abstrakte ästhetik. edition rot, Stuttgart 1969
- Einführung in die informationstheoretische Ästhetik. Grundlegung und Anwendung in der Texttheorie. Rowohlt, Reinbek 1969
- Der Monolog der Terry Jo. (With Ludwig Harig) In: Klaus Schöning (Ed.): Neues Hörspiel. Texte. Partituren. Suhrkamp, Frankfurt/Main 1969, pp. 59–91
- Artistik und Engagement. Präsentation ästhetischer Objekte. Kiepenheuer & Witsch, Cologne 1970
- Existenzmitteilung aus San Franzisko. Hake, Cologne 1970
- nur glas ist wie glas. werbetexte. Fietkau, Berlin 1970
- Die Realität der Literatur. Autoren und ihre Texte. Kiepenheuer & Witsch, Cologne 1971
- Zeichen und Design. Semiotische Ästhetik. Agis, Baden-Baden 1971
- Wörterbuch der Semiotik. (With Elisabeth Walther) Kiepenheuer & Witsch, Cologne 1973
- Semiotische Prozesse und Systeme in Wissenschaftstheorie und Design, Ästhetik und Mathematik. Semiotik vom höheren Standpunkt. Agis, Baden-Baden 1975
- Vermittlung der Realitäten. Semiotische Erkenntnistheorie. Agis, Baden-Baden 1976
- Das Auge Epikurs. Indirektes über Malerei. Deutsche Verlags-Anstalt, Stuttgart 1979
- Die Unwahrscheinlichkeit des Ästhetischen und die semiotische Konzeption der Kunst. Agis, Baden-Baden 1979
- Axiomatik und Semiotik in Mathematik und Naturerkenntnis. Agis, Baden-Baden 1981
- Zentrales und Occasionelles. Poetische Bemerkungen. Edition Künstlerhaus, Stuttgart 1981
- Das Universum der Zeichen. Essays über die Expansionen der Semiotik. Agis, Baden-Baden 1983
- Das graue Rot der Poesie. Gedichte. Agis, Baden-Baden 1983
- Kosmos Atheos. Gedichte. Agis, Baden-Baden 1985
- Repräsentation und Fundierung der Realitäten. Fazit semiotischer Perspektiven. Agis, Baden-Baden 1986
- Nacht-Euklidische Verstecke. Poetische Texte. Agis, Baden-Baden 1988
- Poetische Abstraktionen. Gedichte und Aphorismen. Manus Presse, Stuttgart 1990
- Der Mann, an den ich denke. Ein Fragment. (from his unpublished works, ed. by Elisabeth Walther) edition rot, Stuttgart 1991
- Die Eigenrealität der Zeichen. (from his unpublished works, ed. by Elisabeth Walther) Agis, Baden-Baden 1992

== Secondary literature ==
All references are in German.

- Eckardt, Michael: "...sich in die wissenschaftliche Welt allerbestens einführen können." Max Bense, Walter Wolf und Georg Klaus zwischen Kooperation und Konflikt an der Universität Jena in den Jahren 1945–1949; in: HOSSFELD, U./KAISER, T./MESTRUP, H. (Ed.)(2007): Hochschule im Sozialismus. Studien zur Friedrich-Schiller-Universität Jena (1945-1990). Cologne/Weimar/Vienna 2007, 1929-1970.
- Eckardt, Michael: "Max Bense in Thüringen", in: Palmbaum 14 (2006) 1, 104–111.
- Eckardt, Michael: "Benses Kierkegaard in Jena", Frankfurter Allgemeine Zeitung, 31 January 2006, p. 8.
- Ernst, Christoph: "Max Bense: Der Essay zwischen Poesie und Prosa", in: ders., Essayistische Medienreflexion. Bielefeld, Transcript 2005, 135–144, ISBN 3-89942-376-3
- Thomé, Horst: "Einheit des Wissens im Zeichen „technischer Existenz“ – Max Bense", in: Becker, Norbert und Quarthal, Franz (Ed.) (2004), Die Universität Stuttgart nach 1945: Geschichte – Entwicklungen – Persönlichkeiten, Ostfildern, Thorbecke 2004, 345–348, ISBN 3-7995-0145-2
- Eckardt, Michael: "Bemerkungen zum Brief von Georg Klaus an Max Bense", in: Fuchs-Kittowski, Klaus und Piotrowski, Siegfried (Ed.), Kybernetik und Interdisziplinarität in den Wissenschaften. Berlin: Trafo-Verlag 2004, 391–392.
- Büscher, Barbara; Herrmann, Hans-Christian von; Hoffmann, Christoph (Ed.): Ästhetik als Programm: Max Bense. Daten und Streuungen. Berlin, Vice Versa 2004, 307 pp., with illustrations, ISBN 3-00-014180-4
- Eckardt, Michael: "Angewandte Wissenschaftsrevison – Überschneidungen und Parallelen im Schaffen von Max Bense und Georg Klaus", in: Grundlagenstudien aus Kybernetik und Geisteswissenschaft / Humankybernetik, 43 (2002) 4, 143–152.
- Eckardt, Michael: "Philosophie und Philosophen in Jena: Max Bense und Georg Klaus", in: Weißbecker, M. (Ed.), Gewalten, Gestalten, Erinnerungen. Beiträge zur Geschichte der FSU Jena in den ersten Jahren nach 1945. Jena, Thüringer Forum für Bildung und Wissenschaft 2002, pp. 51–69, ISBN 3-935850-12-3
- Michael Eckardt und Engell, Lorenz (Ed.): Das Programm des Schönen. Ausgewählte Beiträge der Stuttgarter Schule zur Semiotik der Künste und der Medien. Weimar, VDG Verlag und Datenbank für Geisteswissenschaften 2002, 334 pp., ill., graph. depict., ISBN 3-89739-315-8
- Elisabeth Walther: "Max Bense und die Kybernetik", in: Computer Art Faszination, 1999, p. 360
- Harry Walter: Max Bense in Stuttgart, 1994. 16 pages, 11 pictures. Stapled. Deutsches Literaturarchiv Marbach ISBN 3-929146-25-8
