= List of mathematical art software =

List of mathematical art software
Software	Category	License
Apophysis	Fractal art	GPL
Chaotica	Fractal art	Proprietary
Electric Sheep	Fractal art	GPL 2.0-or-later
FractalNow	Fractal art	GPL
Fractint	Fractal art	Public domain
Fragmentarium, FragM	Fractal art	GPL 3.0
FuzzyGraph	Equation & fractal art	Free and open-source software
Fyre	Fractal art	GPL 3.0
Iterated Dynamics	Fractal art	GPL 3.0
MilkDrop	Fractal art	BSD
openPlaG	Fractal art	GPL 2.0
Ultra Fractal	Fractal art	Proprietary
XaoS	Fractal art	GPL
R, rayrender, R Mandelbrot sets, aRtsy, mathart	Fractal, Mandelbrot set, parametric plots	GPL 2.0-or-later
Sterling	Fractal generation	GPL 3.0
Bryce	Fractal landscape	Proprietary
Picogen	Fractal landscape	GPL 3.0
Terragen	Fractal landscape	Proprietary
GeoGebra	Parametric & implicit equation art	GPL
Desmos	Parametric & implicit equation art	Proprietary freeware
Grapher	Parametric & implicit equation art	Proprietary
Winplot	Parametric & implicit equation art	Proprietary freeware
Cinder	Generative art, algorithmic visuals, patterns	BSD
Processing	Algorithmic & generative art	GPL
OpenFrameworks	Generative art	MIT
Grasshopper 3D	Algorithmic design, procedural modeling	Proprietary
P5.js	Algorithmic & generative art	MIT
Python Turtle graphics	Algorithmic & generative art	PSF
matplotlib	Mathematical plotting	PSF
gnuplot	2D and 3D plotting	Various
Inkscape spirograph, WriteTeX, or TexText	Geometric & tessellation art	GPL
Blender Python plugin scripts	Topological art	GPL
Wolfram Mathematica	Topological Art	Proprietary
Houdini	Procedural & simulation-based art	Proprietary
MATLAB	Procedural, simulation-based art	Proprietary
Shadertoy, GLSL	Procedural	Web app
TouchDesigner	Procedural, simulation-based art	Proprietary (free, non-commercial version available)
Unity (with math plugins)	Procedural, simulation-based art	Proprietary
LaTeX (PGF/TikZ, PGFPlots)	Mathematical typography, TeX-based art	LaTeX
Manim	Mathematical animation	MIT
D3.js	Data and information visualization	BSD 3-clause
3D-XplorMath-J	Mathematical visualization	BSD 3-clause
Maxima	Mathematical visualization	GPL
SageMath	Mathematical visualization	GPLv3
SymPy	Symbolic arithmetic	BSD
Wolfram Mathematica & Wolfram Language	Mathematical visuals and others	Proprietary commercial
Logo	Educational turtle graphics	freeware

== Gallery ==
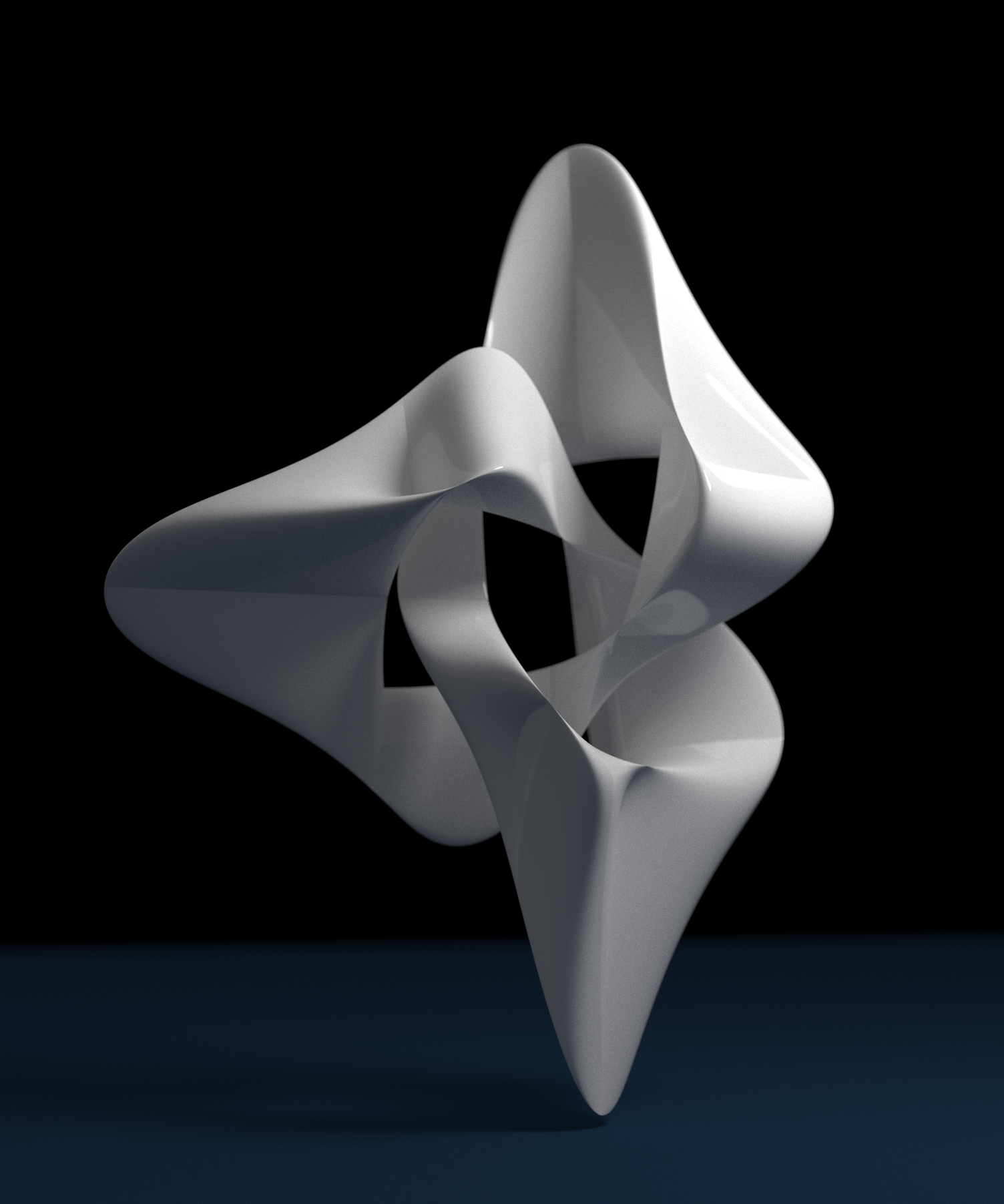
Trefoil knot, created with a parametric equation and ray traced in Python.

Hyperboloid animation made with Wolfram Mathematica

Helicatenoid made with Grapher

== See also ==
- ASCII art
- Computer-based mathematics education
- Computer representation of surfaces
- List of creative coding software
- Fractal-generating software
- Julia set
- List of creative coding software
- List of interactive geometry software
- List of mathematical artists
- Mathematical software
- Parametric surface
- Procedural modeling suites
- Ray tracing
