= Creative coding =

Activity of computer programming for expressive purposes

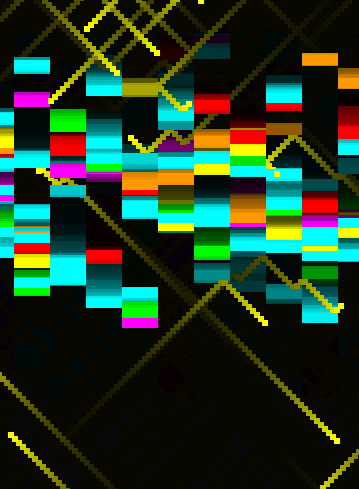
A heavily modified version of the classic 1980s video game Breakout produces visually interesting glitches.

Creative coding is a type of computer programming in which the goal is to create something expressive instead of something functional. It is used to create live visuals and for VJing, as well as creating visual art and design, entertainment (e.g. video games), art installations, projections and projection mapping, sound art, advertising, product prototypes, and much more.

== History ==
Using programming to create art is a practice that started in the 1960s. In later decades groups such as Compos 68 successfully explored programming for artistic purposes, having their work exhibited in international exhibitions. From the 80s onward expert programmers joined the demoscene, and tested their skills against each other by creating "demos": highly technically competent visual creations.

Recent exhibitions and books, including Dominic Lopes' A Philosophy of Computer Art (2009) have sought to examine the integral role of coding in contemporary art beyond that of Human Computer Interface (HCI). Criticising Lopes however, Juliff and Cox argue that Lopes continues to privilege interface and user at the expense of the integral condition of code in much computer art. Arguing for a more nuanced appreciation of coding, Juliff and Cox set out contemporary creative coding as the examination of code and intentionality as integral to the users understanding of the work.

Currently there is a renewed interest in the question of why programming as a method of producing art has not flourished. Google has renewed interest in their Dev Art initiative, but this in turn has elicited strong reactions from a number of creative coders who claim that coining a new term to describe their practice is counterproductive.

== Artists using creative coding ==
Some contemporary artists who use creative coding in their work are Daniel Shiffman, Zachary Lieberman, Golan Levin, Ben Fry, and Giles Whitaker.

== List of creative coding software ==
Although any technology or programming language can potentially be used for creative purposes, certain libraries and frameworks have been specifically crafted to aid in the rapid prototyping and development of creative works. Software toolkits frequently used in this context include:

Name	Description	Operating system	Programming language	License
Cinder	Library for programming with aesthetic intent, including domains like graphics, audio, video, and computational geometry.	Cross-platform	C++	2-Clause BSD License
Dittytoy	Platform that allows you to create generative music using a minimalistic javascript API.	Any with a web browser	JavaScript	Proprietary
generativepy	Library for creating visual generative art, and mathematical diagrams, as images and video.	Cross-platform	Python	MIT License
Manim	Animation engine for programmatically creating precise mathematical visualizations, generative graphics, and educational animations.	Cross-platform	Python	MIT License
Max MSP	Visual programming language for music and multimedia.	Windows, Mac OS	Visual programming language	Proprietary
Nannou	Library that aims to make it easy for artists to express themselves with simple, fast, reliable code.	Cross-platform	Rust	MIT License
NodeBox	Creative coding environment based on node-based design for generating 2D visuals and generative graphics.	macOS	Python	GPLv3
openFrameworks	Toolkit designed to assist the creative process by providing a simple and intuitive framework for experimentation.	Cross-platform	C++	MIT License
OPENRNDR	Creative coding framework designed and developed for prototyping and developing robust performant visual and interactive applications.	Cross-platform	Kotlin	2-Clause BSD License
p5.js	Platform that empowers artists, designers, students, and anyone to learn to code and express themselves creatively on the web. Based on the core principles of Processing.	Any with a web browser	JavaScript	LGPL
Processing	A flexible software sketchbook and a language for learning how to code within the context of the visual arts.	Cross-platform	Java or Python	GPL, LGPL
Pure Data	Pd enables musicians, visual artists, performers, researchers, and developers to create software graphically without writing lines of code.	Cross-platform	Visual programming language	Modified BSD
Shoebot	A creative coding environment designed for making vector graphics and animations with Python.	Cross-platform	Python	GPLv3
SuperCollider	An environment and programming language for real-time audio synthesis and algorithmic composition.	Cross-platform	SuperCollider	GPLv3
TouchDesigner	Node-based visual programming environment for real-time interactive multimedia and generative visuals.	Windows	Visual programming language	Proprietary
vvvv	Hybrid visual/textual live-programming environment for easy prototyping and development. It is designed to facilitate the handling of large media environments with physical interfaces, real-time motion graphics, audio and video	Windows	Visual programming language	Proprietary
ZIM	JavaScript Canvas Framework adding many conveniences, components and controls with an emphasis on simplifying code for learners and professionals.	Cross-platform	JavaScript	MIT License

== Hardware use ==
Creative coding occasionally involves hardware components for inputting data from the environment, producing output or for interacting with participants. Examples of commonly used hardware includes microphones, webcams or depth cameras, motion controllers, single-board microcontrollers, MIDI controllers, projectors, LED strips, printers and plotters.

== See also ==
- Creative computing
- Computer art
- Demoscene
- Generative design
- Generative art
- List of mathematical art software
- Live coding
