= Creative technology =

Interdisciplinary field

Creative technology is a broadly interdisciplinary and transdisciplinary field combining computing, design, art and the humanities. The field of creative technology encompasses art, digital product design, digital media or an advertising and media made with a software-based, electronic and/or data-driven engine. Examples include multi-sensory experiences made using computer graphics, video production, digital music, digital cinematography, virtual reality, augmented reality, video editing, software engineering, 3D printing, the Internet of Things, CAD/CAM and wearable technology.

In the artistic field, new media art and internet art are examples of work being done using creative technology. Performances, interactive installations, and other immersive experiences take museum-going to the next level and may serve as research processes for humans' artistic and emotional integration with machines. Some believe that "creativity has the potential to be revolutionised with technology", or view the field of creative technology as helping to "disrupt" the way people today interact with computers, and usher in a more integrated, immersive experience.

== Description ==
Creative technology has been defined as "the blending of knowledge across multiple disciplines to create new experiences or products" that meet end-user and organizational needs. A more specific conceptualization describes it as the combination of information, holographic systems, sensors, audio technologies, image, and video technologies, among others, with artistic practices and methods. The central characteristic is identified as an ability to do things better.

Creative technology is also seen as the intersection of new technology with creative initiatives such as fashion, art, advertising, media, and entertainment. As such, it is a way to make connections between countries seeking to update their culture; a winter 2015 Forbes article tells of 30 creative technology startups from the UK making the rounds in Singapore, Kuala Lumpur and New York City in an effort to raise funds and make connections.

== Applications ==
Creative technology facilities may be organized as arts, research or job development entities, such as the UK's Foundation for Art and Creative Technology which has presented hundreds of new media and digital artworks from around the world, or a recently established $20.5 million project in Hawaii specializing in film industry job training and workforce development programs which plans to offer robotics, computer labs, recording studios and editing bays, pitched as a "game-changing" opportunity to bring new skills and jobs to Kauai. Degrees in this field were designed to address needs for cross-disciplinary interaction and aim to develop lateral thinking skills across more rigidly defined academic areas. Some educators have complained that creative technology tools, though "widely available", are difficult to use for young populations.

The first major corporation to have a corporate officer bearing the title creative technology was The Walt Disney Company, which gave it first to the imagineer, Bran Ferren in 1993, who eventually became Disney's president of creative technology in 1998. At about the same time, the first educational research center in the United States was created to bridge these disciplines across industry, academia and the defense communities, designated the University of Southern California's, Institute for Creative Technologies. The ICT was established with funding by the US Army.

Marketers and advertisers are also looking toward the power of creative technology to re-engage customers. The UK's Marketing Agencies Association is promoting creative technology as a way to build a more connected and personalized engagement with prospective customers, which launched a Creative Technology Initiative in early 2015. Industry associations and developers, arts organizations and agency creatives alike call for more investment in technology, which has lagged behind the sea change in the industry that is introducing more technology into creative fields such as Google. Many advertising agencies and other businesses have begun to create internal labs for research in creative technology. For example, Unilever created its Foundry Project as a way for the company to "embrace the mentality of hacking, deploying and scaling"; they share their discoveries and view the lab as a way to incorporate technology into the company, drive experimentation and engage with strategic partners. The Adobe Creative Technologies lab collaborated with the MIT Media Lab, one of the most notable endeavors in the creative technology field, to give artists the ability to draw geometric designs with a computer without having to master text-based programming or math.

== Examples ==
- "Creativeapplications.Net (CAN) is a community of creative practitioners working at the intersection of art, media and technology."
- A pepper grinder that disabled wifi in the household when twisted was introduced by the head of creative technology at agency Clemenger BBDO.
- ZKM has an annual prize for creative apps, the App Art Awards
- ITP (the Interactive Telecommunications Program) has a class in "Creative Computing"
- "The Eyeo Festival brings together a rich intersection of people doing fascinating things with technology. Artists, data designers, creative coders, AI & XR explorers, storytellers, researchers, technology & platform developers all cross paths and share inspiration at Eyeo"
- Artist Jake Lee-High created an interactive street experience for the premiere of Showtime (TV network) Penny Dreadful
- "Fake Love promotes major brands with immersive, wildly imaginative multimedia spectacles, from light-projected racetracks for Lexus to virtual reality (VR) videos for the New York Times Company"
- The works of Becky Stern, an electronics and fashion artist based in New York City.
- "You’re waving your hands in-front of a big screen, and the designs and patterns mimic your movements; You walk into a company’s lobby, and a digital wall displays a beautiful, abstract visualization based on the company's sales data"
- FIT has an annual Creative Technology Exhibition

== Careers ==
Professionals who work in the field of creative technology tend to have a background as developers and may work in digital or entertainment media, with an advertising agency, or in a new electronic product development role. In an advertising agency setting, a professional with a job description including creative technology may be a designer who became interested in technology, or a developer who focuses on the bigger picture of experience design. Department heads in creative technology may be charged with integrating new technologies into the agency's departments, leveraging partnerships with cutting edge providers and platforms. For example, the head of creative technology at Grey Global Group in New York "created an in-house lab... which highlights new tech each month with exhibits, events, and workshops." Members of the team may have the ability to both write computer code and build electronics for prototypes.

The creative technologist job title is likely to refer to a developer who understands the creative process and (often) the world of advertising. The person is actually making and coding and may be building web projects, mobile apps and other digital experiences. They are trying out new concepts and ideas, and modifying; this is recognized as similar to the artistic process but applied to media, advertising and other creative industries. Creative technologists have been referred to as technology-focussed individuals who either sit within or work closely with the creative team, recognizing that siloed departments of technology and design have historically led to bad agency work. Responsibilities described in a 2014 job posting for "Creative Technologist" at Google included "collaborating on the ideation and development of 'never been done before' digital experiences in partnership with top brands and agencies", and "contributing to the development of cutting-edge prototypes in the field of creative technology". There are several resources that list companies that work in the field of creative technology.

== Academic degree ==
A Master or Bachelor degree in creative technologies or creative technology is a broadly interdisciplinary and transdisciplinary course of study combining fields of computer technology, design, art and the humanities. Established as a modern degree addressing needs for cross-disciplinary interaction, one of its fundamental objectives is to develop lateral thinking skills across more rigidly defined academic areas, recognized as a valuable component in expanding technological horizons. The Creative Technology & Design (CT&D) subject area at the Fashion Institute of Technology offers specialized courses and both credit and non-credit programs. According to FIT's website, the mission of this transdisciplinary subject area is to elevate students’ understanding of advanced design concepts, as well as their command of cutting-edge technologies. The Creative Technology 2-year portfolio program at Miami Ad School description reads, "You are a techie with creative passion and talent—or—a creative with a knack for tech...It's about how we integrate machine learning and artificial intelligence into a creative environment". Creative Technology is also seen as an industry and skill set for the emerging economy, as in this quote by a University of Texas at Austin dean at the opening of a new school at the University presumed to become the largest academic unit in the college: "The School of Design and Creative Technologies moves UT Austin more assertively into emerging creative, commercial disciplines that are driving culture and economies in the 21st century".

== Tools ==
There are a wide range of tools that are utilized by creative technologists. Below is a short list, but there are several other extensive lists available.

- Arduino - an open-source electronics platform based on easy-to-use hardware and software.
- Raspberry Pi – a low-cost computer the size of a credit card that runs Linux
- Processing - a java-family programming language and development environment promoting software literacy within the visual arts and visual literacy within technology.
- p5.js - the javascript implementation of Processing
- Cinder - a professional library for creative coding in C++.
- OpenFrameworks - a C++ toolkit for teaching creative coding.
- Max - a visual data-flow programming language for music and multimedia
- JavaScript - the language of web browsers, including HTML5.
- TouchDesigner - a visual programming language for creative technology applications
