= Design By Numbers =

- Paradigm: procedural
- Designed by: John Maeda
- Developer: Ben Fry, Tom White
- First appeared: 1999; 27 years ago
- Final release: 3.0.1 / 2003; 23 years ago
- Typing discipline: strong
- OS: Windows; MacOS 9 Linux (no official support)
- License: Proprietary
- File formats: .dbn
- Website: dbn.media.mit.edu

Influenced by
- Smalltalk, Logo

Influenced
- Processing

Design By Numbers (DBN) is a discontinued programming language and influential experiment in teaching computer programming initiated at the MIT Media Lab during the 1990s. Led by John Maeda and his students, they created software to help designers, artists, and other non-programmers to start programming easily.

The software can be run in a web browser, and published alongside the software was a book and courseware.

Though the project was discontinued, it influenced many other projects aimed at making computer programming more accessible to non-technical people. Its most public result is the language Processing, created by Maeda's students Casey Reas and Ben Fry, who built on the work of DBN and have gone on to international success.

== History ==
Design By Numbers was developed by the Aesthetics and Computation Group (1996-2003) at the MIT Media Lab.

The first version of DBN was created by John Maeda in 1999. DBN 1.0.1 was developed by Tom White. DBN 2 and 3 by Ben Fry. In late 2002, John Maeda took over the further development of DBN.

Professor Warren Sack provided a toolkit for doing Logo-style graphics in January 22, 2003.

The last version of DBN (3.0.1) was released in 2003. Beta version of DBN 4, developed by Jessica Rosenkrantz, was scheduled for release in August 2003, but was never released. For a time, DBN 4 was intended to be the final version of the language.

In 2005, John Maeda announced that he would continue developing DBN as part of the MIT Physical Language Workshop (PLW) research group. The status of the new version of DBN or its derivatives is unknown. PLW remained active until 2008.

== Features ==
DBN consists of an integrated development environment (IDE) and a programming language.

DBN programs can be written four languages: English (default), Spanish, French, and Japanese. Each command has been translated into the appropriate language, e.g. the equivalents of the command paper are: papel (es), papier (fr), かみ (jp).

== See also ==
- Processing
- Smile (software)
