= Creative technology (disambiguation) =

Creative technology may refer to:

- Creative technology
- Creative Technology Limited, the computer hardware manufacturer.
- Citroën's advertising slogan.
