= Arıkan =

Arıkan is a Turkish surname. Notable people with the surname include:

- Burak Arıkan (born 1976), Turkish artist
- Erdal Arıkan (born 1958), Turkish electrical engineer
- Hakan Arıkan (born 1982), Turkish footballer
- Jale Arıkan (born 1965), Turkish-German actress
- Kemal Arıkan (1927–1982), Turkish diplomat assassinated in the U.S. by an Armenian group
- Meltem Arıkan (born 1968), Turkish novelist and playwright
- Okyanus Arıkan (born 2004), Turkish yacht racer
- Vural Arıkan (1929–1993), Turkish economist, lawyer and politician
