= Creative computing =

Computer science applied to the arts

Creative computing covers the interdisciplinary area at the cross-over of the creative arts and computing. Issues of creativity include knowledge discovery, for example.

== Overview ==
The International Journal of Creative Computing describes creative computing as follows:

Creative computing refers to a meta-technology to coalesce knowledge in computing and other disciplines. People use computers as aids to creativity and creative-computing topics may reshape the world as we know it. Applications are seen in arts, entertainment/games, mobile applications, multimedia, product/web design and other interactive systems.

Creative computing is interdisciplinary in nature and topics relating to it include applications, development method, evaluation, modeling, philosophy, principles, support environment, and theory.

The term "creative computing" is used both in the United Kingdom and the United States (e.g., at Harvard University and MIT).

== Degree programmes ==
A number of university degree (Bachelor's degree) programmes in Creative Computing exist, for example at:

- University of the Arts London
- Queen's University
- University of West London
- St. Pölten University of Applied Sciences
- Bath Spa University
- Falmouth University
- Goldsmiths, University of London
- Queen Mary, University of London
- Wrexham Glyndŵr University
- Dún Laoghaire Institute of Art, Design and Technology
- Leeds Beckett University, the programme is named as BSc (Hons) Creative Media Technology
- University of Portsmouth, the programme is named as BSc (Hons) Creative Media Technologies
- City University of Hong Kong, the programme is named as Bachelor of Science in Creative Media, jointly offered by the School of Creative Media and the Department of Computer Science
- Technological and Higher Education Institute of Hong Kong, the programme is named as Bachelor of Science (Honours) Multimedia Technology and Innovation
- Hong Kong Metropolitan University, the programme is named as Bachelor of Arts with Honours in Computing and Interactive Entertainment
- Saint Francis University (Hong Kong), the programme is named as Bachelor of Science (Honours) in Digital Entertainment Technology
- Sogang University, (Seoul), the programme is offered by Department of Art & Technology
- Dún Laoghaire Institute of Art, Design and Technology

Master's degree programmes:

- City University of Hong Kong, the programme is named as Master of Arts in Creative Media (MACM)
- Hong Kong Polytechnic University, the programme is named as Innovative Multimedia Entertainment (MSc)
- The Hong Kong University of Science and Technology, the programme is named as Master of Philosophy and Doctor of Philosophy Programs in Computational Media and Arts
- Sogang University, (Seoul), the programme is offered by Department of Art & Technology

== Journal ==
International Journal of Creative Computing
- Discipline: Computer science
- Language: English
- Edited by: Andy M. Connor

Publication details
- History: 2013–2016
- Publisher: Inderscience Publishers
- Frequency: Quarterly

Standard abbreviations
- ISO 4: Int. J. Creat. Comput.

Indexing
- ISSN: 2043-8354 (print); 2043-8346 (web)
- OCLC no.: 889287096

Links
- Journal homepage; Online access; Online archive

The International Journal of Creative Computing is a quarterly peer-reviewed scientific journal published by Inderscience Publishers, covering creativity in computing and the other way around. The editor-in-chief is Andy M. Connor (Auckland University of Technology).

The journal was established in 2013 and is abstracted and indexed in CSA, ProQuest, and DBLP databases. The journal is currently in the process of recruiting a new Editorial Board for re-launch in 2021.

== See also ==
- Computer art
- Creative coding
- Creative technology
