= Daniel Shiffman =

American computer programmer

- Born: July 29, 1973 (age 53); New Haven, Connecticut, U.S.
- Education: Yale University, Tisch School of the Arts
- Known for: Processing
- Website: shiffman.net thecodingtrain.com

Daniel Shiffman (born July 29, 1973) is a computer programmer, a member of the Board of Directors of the Processing Foundation, and an Associate Arts Professor at the Interactive Telecommunications Program (ITP) at New York University Tisch School of the Arts. Shiffman received a BA in Mathematics and Philosophy from Yale University and a master's degree from the ITP.

== Early research ==
His early artworks Swarm #1 (2002), Swarm #2 (2002), and Swarm #3 (2004) explored algorithms to create patterns of virtual flocking birds based on Craig Reynolds’s Boids model as real-time digital brush strokes generated from live video input, producing an organic painterly effect in real time. Prior to his interests in open source and visual art, Shiffman was the producing director at P73 Productions Inc., a small New York theater company he started with some friends from Yale.

== Current work ==
Daniel Shiffman is currently focused on developing tutorials, examples, and libraries for Processing, the open source programming environment created by Casey Reas and Ben Fry. Shiffman runs a popular YouTube channel, The Coding Train, with instructional videos on how to program in Processing and p5.js, an open-source JavaScript library with a similar API to that of Processing. He has also taught an adaptation of his The Nature of Code book through Kadenze using p5.js.

== Books ==
- The Nature of Code, editions
  - Using Processing - Shiffman, Daniel (2012). The Nature of Code : Simulating Natural Systems with Processing. Illustrated by Zannah Marsh. self-published. ISBN 978-0985930806. Archived from the original on 2016-03-28.
  - Using p5.js - Shiffman, Daniel (2024). Fry, Shannon (ed.). The Nature of Code : Simulating Natural Systems with JavaScript. Illustrated by Zannah Marsh. ISBN 978-1718503700.
- Learning Processing
  - Shiffman, Daniel (2008). Learning Processing : A Beginner's Guide to Programming Images, Animation, and Interaction. ISBN 9780123736024. Archived from the original on 2011-07-27.
  - Shiffman, Daniel (2015). Learning Processing : A Beginner's Guide to Programming Images, Animation, and Interaction (2nd ed.). ISBN 978-0123944436.

== Papers ==
- Daniel Shiffman. 2004. Swarm. In ACM SIGGRAPH 2004 Emerging technologies (SIGGRAPH '04), Heather Elliott-Famularo (Ed.). ACM, New York, NY, USA, 26.
- Daniel Shiffman. 2004. Reactive. In ACM SIGGRAPH 2004 Emerging technologies (SIGGRAPH '04), Heather Elliott-Famularo (Ed.). ACM, New York, NY, USA, 22.

== Press ==
- Hughes, Matthew. "Coding Rainbow is a gorgeous, free guide to creative software development." The Next Web Sept 2016.
- Schwendener, Martha. "Populism, Technology and Interactivity: Review." New York Times, Lateition (East Coast) ed.: NJ.13. 2011.
- Fox, Catherine. "Artistic Leap Savannah Museum Gets High-Profile Addition: Main Edition." The Atlanta Journal - Constitution: G.1. 2006.
- Bayliss, Sarah. "What if Jackson Pollock were a PC?" New York Times, Lateition (East Coast) ed.: 2.41. 2003.
- Marriott, Michel. "I Don't Know Who You are, but You're Toast." The New York Times 1998.
