= DBN =

DBN may refer to:

== Computer science ==
- Deep belief network
- Dynamic Bayesian network
- Design By Numbers

== Other uses ==
- Darebin railway station, Melbourne
- DBN (band), a German dance music trio
- Degue Broadcasting Network, a Nigerian television channel
- 1,5-Diazabicyclo(4.3.0)non-5-ene, a chemical

== See also ==
- DBN1, a gene (and neuron growth protein)
