= Theo Watson =

British artist and programmer

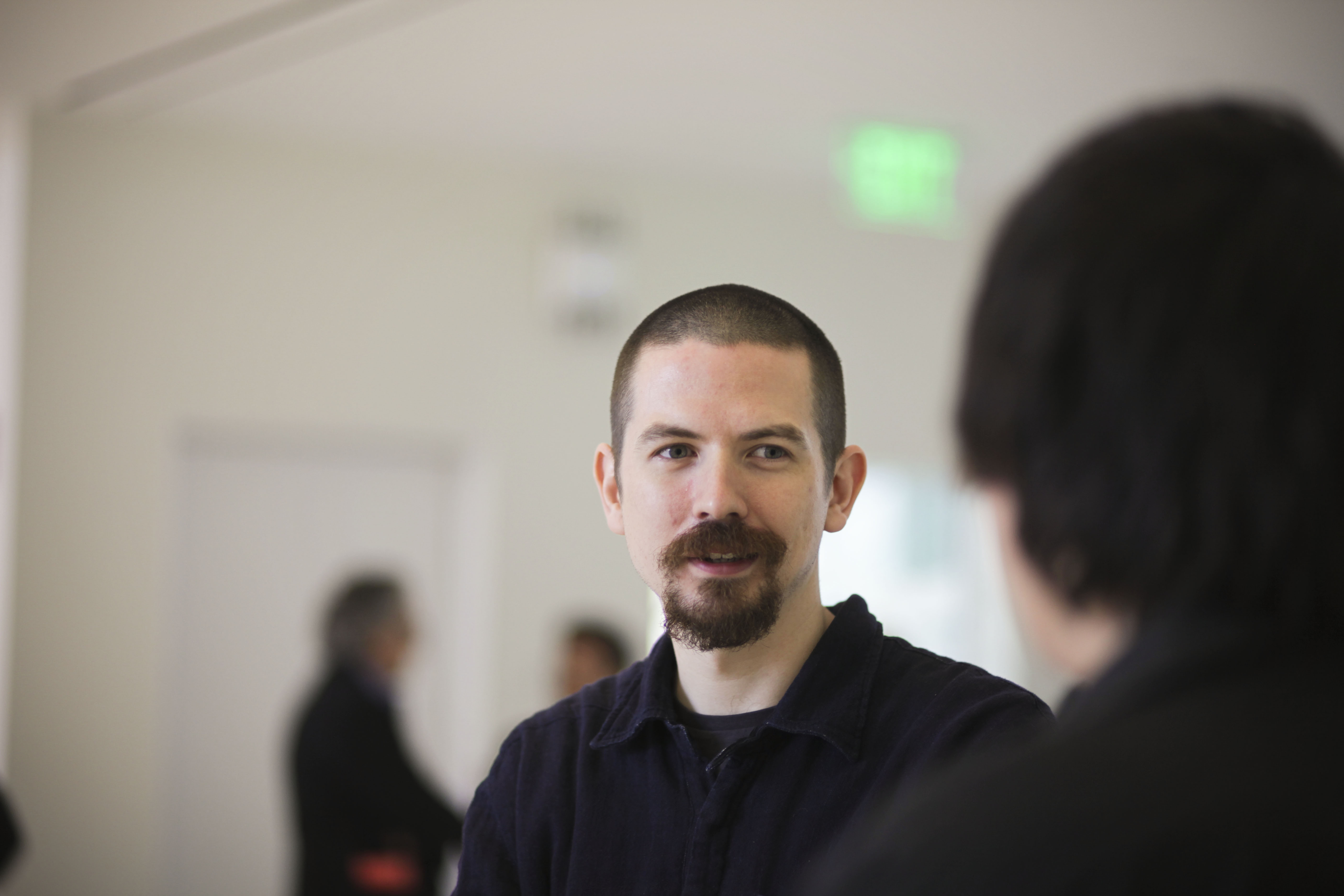
- Born: London, England
- Education: BFA Design and Technology, Parsons School of Design
- Known for: Video, interactive art, programming, digital art

Theo Watson is a British artist and programmer. His art work includes interactive video, large-scale public projections, computer vision projects, and interactive sound recordings which have featured in museums and galleries across the world including Museum of Modern Art, New York Hall of Science, Tate Modern amongst others. Watson is a partner at Design I/O, a Cambridge-based interactive design firm known for cutting edge, immersive installations. He is also co-founder of the programming toolkit openFrameworks, co-creator of the EyeWriter and a virtual fellow at Free Art and Technology Lab.

== Biography ==
Watson has a Bachelor of Fine Arts in Design and Technology from Parsons School of Design.

As a programmer, Watson has worked with Zach Lieberman in creating openFrameworks, an open source C++ library for creative coding and graphics. He is a member of the Graffiti Research Lab, and in 2007 wrote the code for their LASER Tag project. In 2006, Watson worked with director Michel Gondry, writing custom software for physical sensors and cameras in three interactive installations in Gondry's Science of Sleep exhibition at Deitch Projects in New York City.

From Spring to Fall 2006, Watson worked as a Production Fellow at Eyebeam. He is currently a Virtual Fellow at Free Art and Technology Lab (a.k.a. FAT Lab).

== Artworks ==
Watson makes site-specific installations that look at how humans relate to various situations and spaces. Many of Watson's works use elements of physical computing in interactive installations. In Vinyl Workout (Rotterdam Electronic Music Festival, 2006), custom software and cameras track user's movements as they walk along a large projection of a record on the floor, manipulating the audio and video playback with the speed and direction of their steps.

In Audio Space (2005), a user wearing a GPS-enabled headset can record messages at any position within a room, and hear all the sounds left by previous visitors as they move about the space.

Laser Tag, a 2007 installation by Watson, used a laser projector to enable members of the public to write names and messages in light on the side of a Rotterdam office building. It was also shown at MoMA and the Tate Modern.

Born out of Necessity, a collaborative artwork by Watson and other artists, involves the use of eye-tracking technology to allow a graffiti artist afflicted with amyotrophic lateral sclerosis to create virtual tags; it is in the collection of MoMA.

The Tate Muybridgizer, commissioned from Watson and Emily Gobeille by the Tate Modern, is a cellular phone application that allows users to create animations in the style of Eadweard Muybridge's Zoopraxiscope.

== Exhibitions ==
Watson has shown projects at Eyebeam, Deitch Projects, the DUMBO Video Art Festival, Resfest, the inaugural Rotterdam Electronic Music Festival, and at Montevideo/Time Based Arts in (Amsterdam).
