= Physical Language Workshop =

Research group at MIT (2003-2008)

The Physical Language Workshop (PLW) was a research group at the MIT Media Laboratory from 2003 to 2008. The group was led by John Maeda and designed tools for creating digital art in a networked environment. The primary impact targets of the Physical Language Workshop were in the areas of digital media service architectures, distance education, and information visualisation systems.

One major group research of PLW was OPENSTUDIO, an experimental online micro-economy for arts, where participants created and sold artwork in an online marketplace using a virtual currency. The OPENSTUDIO platform was active from 2005 to 2008. OPENSTUDIO was developed and maintained by the PLW researchers Burak Arikan, Luis Blackaller, Annie Ding, Brent Fitzgerald, Amber Frid-Jimenez, Kate Hollenbach, Kelly Norton as well as contributions by Noah Fields, Carlos Rocha, Marc Schwartz.

On the OPENSTUDIO's community-based economic system, participants created, bought, and sold artwork with free creative tools, a flexible network infrastructure, supported by an open web services API. Draw was the first application run on OPENSTUDIO to make simple vector illustrations and stored drawing data in the SVG format. When you bought a drawing from someone, you could open it in Draw and make a new work of your own derived from the modified piece. The versions of the drawings, its connections between the modified art works, and previous owners of the works known as provenance were kept and openly presented on the platform interfaces.

The OPENSTUDIO Archive lives in a GitHub repository and contains SVG files and info to retrieve 5 years of meta-data.

Another group project was E15 (software), an OpenGL-based web environment for creating rich interactions with existing web content. E15 was developed by Kyle Buza, Takashi Okamoto, Luis Blackaller, and Kate Hollenbach.

== History ==
The origins of Physical Language Workshop lies in the research of the Aesthetics and Computation Group (1996 - 2003) also led by John Maeda, as well as the Visible Language Workshop (1974 - 1994) led by Muriel Cooper at the MIT Media Laboratory.

In 1985, the Visible Language Workshop joined the MIT Architectural Machine Group, and the Center for Advanced Visual Studies (CAVS) to form the MIT Media Lab, which was instituted by Professor Nicholas Negroponte and former MIT President and Science Advisor to President John F. Kennedy, Jerome Wiesner.
