= Libs Elliott =

Canadian quilter and designer

- Born: 1974 (age 51–52)
- Education: OCAD University
- Known for: quilter and fabric designer
- Website: libselliott.com

Elizabeth "Libs" Elliott (born 1974) is a Canadian quilter and designer known for her use of procedurally generated geometric quilt designs.

== Work ==
Elliott studied textiles at OCAD University (as well as photography at the University of Ottawa and cultural studies at Trent University) but did not start quilting until taking a class in 2009, after a 15-year career in advertising.

In 2012, she was introduced to the Processing design software by a friend, the digital artist Joshua Davis, and began experimenting with quilts based on random geometric patterns output by the program. Her work has been featured in Canadian Interiors, Casa Vogue Brazil, and Make:; and exhibited at the DesignTO festival, the Wisconsin Museum of Quilts and Fiber Arts, and at the International Quilt Museum. She designs fabric for Andover Fabrics, and sells quilting patterns through her website.

Outside the quilt world, she has designed the branding for a limited-edition Absolut bottle commemorating the 150th anniversary of Canada in 2017, and various patterns for the electronic device case brand GelaSkins.
