= Alphabet Synthesis Machine =

Interactive digital artwork by Golan Levin (et al.)

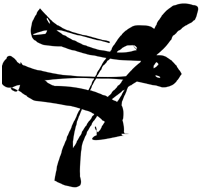
A character produced by the Alphabet Synthesis Machine

The Alphabet Synthesis Machine (2002) is a work of interactive art which makes use of genetic algorithms to "evolve" a set of glyphs similar in appearance to a real-world alphabet. Users create initial glyphs and the program takes over. As the creators of the project put it, their goal was "to bring about the specific feeling of semi-sense one experiences when one recognizes—- but cannot read—- the unfamiliar writing of another culture." The project was developed by Golan Levin, a new-media artist, in collaboration with Cassidy Curtis and Jonathan Feinberg.
