= 3Blue1Brown =

Math YouTube channel

- The channel name and logo reference the color of Grant's right eye, which has blue-brown sectoral heterochromia. It also symbolizes the channel's visual approach to math.
- Born: Grant Sanderson
- Occupation: YouTuber

YouTube information
- Channel: 3Blue1Brown
- Years active: 2015–present
- Genres: Mathematics, Education
- Subscribers: 8.49 million
- Views: 759 million
- Last updated: July 19, 2026
- Website: www.3blue1brown.com

3Blue1Brown is an educational YouTube channel created and run by Grant Sanderson. The channel focuses on teaching higher mathematics from a visual perspective, and on the process of discovery and inquiry-based learning in mathematics, which Sanderson calls "inventing math".

== Grant Sanderson ==
=== Early life and education ===
Sanderson graduated from Stanford University in 2015 with a bachelor's degree in mathematics. He worked for Khan Academy from 2015 to 2016 as part of their content fellowship program, producing videos and articles about multivariable calculus, after which he started focusing his full attention on 3Blue1Brown.

=== Career ===
In 2020 Grant Sanderson became one of the creators and lecturers of the MIT course Introduction to Computational Thinking, together with Alan Edelman, David Sanders, James Schloss, and Benoit Forget. The course uses the Julia programming language and Grant Sanderson's animations to explain various topics: convolutions, image processing, COVID-19 data visualization, epidemic modelling, ray tracing, introduction to climate modelling, ocean modelling, and the algorithms that lie behind these topics.

In January 2020 Sanderson delivered a talk in An Evening with Grant Sanderson, hosted by the Stanford Speakers Bureau. Sanderson offered his perspective on engaging with math: instead of prioritizing usefulness, he emphasizes emotion, wonder and imagination. He aims to "bring life to math" with visuals, graphics, and animations. In August 2021, Sanderson was one of several featured speakers at SIGGRAPH 2021.

In February 2022 Sanderson determined that the best starting word in the game Wordle was CRANE using information theory. Later, he stated that the code he wrote to determine the best starting word had a bug in it, and the actual best starting word that gives the lowest average score is SALET.

In November 2022 Sanderson delivered a keynote speech, "What can algorithms teach us about education?", at the 17th Dutch National Informatics Congress CelerIT hosted by Stichting Nationaal Informatica Congres (SNiC). Sanderson offered his perspective on how mathematics education should evolve in the future and related his findings with the way neural networks learn, he emphasizes the need for students to grasp concepts and understand them.

== Origin ==
3Blue1Brown started as a personal programming project in early 2015. In an episode of the podcast Showmakers, Sanderson explained that he wanted to practice his coding skills and decided to make a graphics library in Python, which eventually became the open-source project Manim (Mathematical Animation Engine). To have a goal for the project, he decided to create a video with the library and upload it to YouTube. On March 4, 2015, he uploaded his first video. He started publishing more videos and improving the graphics tool.

== Videos, podcasts and other media ==
3Blue1Brown videos are themed around visualizing math, including pure math such as number theory and topology as well as more applied topics in computer science and physics. The visuals are predominantly generated by Manim, a Python animation library written by Sanderson, though occasionally visuals are drawn from other software such as macOS's Grapher application.

The channel's videos have been featured in Popular Mechanics, ABC News, and Quanta Magazine. Sanderson has appeared on numerous notable podcasts, including Numberphile, Lex Fridman, the Art of Problem Solving, Siraj Raval, and Showmakers.

== Manim ==
Manim
- Original author: Grant Sanderson
- Written in: Python
- Operating system: Linux, macOS, Windows
- Type: Animation engine
- License: MIT License
- Website: www.3blue1brown.com
- Repository: github.com/3b1b/manim

Manim (short for Mathematical Animation Engine) is a cross-platform, free and open-source animation engine released under the MIT License. It was initially developed by Grant Sanderson in early 2015. Manim is a Python library for creating precise, programmatic animations of mathematical concepts. It allows users to define graphical scenes with mathematical objects, transformations, text, etc., and render them into videos. It is especially known for being the tool behind many of the visuals used in the 3Blue1Brown video series.

There is also a fork maintained by the community that differs from Sanderson's version and includes improvements.

== See also ==
- List of mathematical art software
- List of creative coding software
- Computer-based mathematics education
