= Houdini (software) =

3D animation software

SideFX Houdini
- Developer: Side Effects Software Inc.
- Release: 1.0 / October 2, 1996; 29 years ago
- Stable release: 22.0.368 / July 15, 2026; 2 months ago
- Written in: C++, Python
- Operating system: Linux, macOS, Windows
- Available in: English
- Type: 3D computer graphics
- License: Proprietary
- Website: www.sidefx.com

Houdini is an application developed by Toronto SideFX, who originally adapted it from the PRISMS suite of procedural generation software tools.

The procedural tools can be used to produce a broad range of different types of data, such as 3D models, animation, many types of simulations, game level/environment layouts, rendered images/footage, USD assets, task-scheduling setups, and completely custom solutions to nearly any problem in VFX/CG/synthesis as long as it is well-understood by the artist/operator. Some of its procedural features have been in existence since 1987.

Houdini is most commonly used for the creation of visual effects in film and television. It is used by major VFX companies such as Walt Disney Animation Studios, C.O.R.E. Digital Pictures, DNEG, ILM, MPC, Framestore, Sony Pictures Imageworks, Illumination Studios Paris, Eyeline, Polygon Pictures, Marza Animation Planet, Method Studios, RSP and The Mill.

It has been used in many feature animation productions, including Disney's feature films Fantasia 2000, Frozen, Zootopia, Raya and the Last Dragon and Wish, the Blue Sky Studios film Rio, C.O.R.E. Feature Animation's The Wild, and DNA Productions' Ant Bully.

SideFX also publishes Houdini Apprentice, a limited version of the software that is free of charge for non-commercial use.

== Release history ==
| Version | Release date | Supported OSs | Price of full license (USD) | Observations |
|---|---|---|---|---|
| 1.0 | 1996-OCT-02 | IRIX | $9,500 | Houdini 1.0 at SIGGRAPH 1996 |
| 2.0 | 1997-AUG-05 | IRIX | | |
| 2.5 | 1998-MAR-28 | IRIX, Windows NT | | Windows NT support |
| 3.0 | 1999-OCT-02 | IRIX, Windows NT | | |
| 4.0 | 2000-JUL-24 | IRIX, Windows NT, Linux | $17,000 | Linux support |
| 5.0 | 2002-MAR-12 | IRIX, Windows NT, Linux, SunOS | $16,000 | First version on SunOS |
| 5.5 | 2002-MAY-14 | IRIX, Windows NT, Linux, SunOS | $16,000 | |
| 6.0 | 2003-MAY-08 | IRIX, Windows NT, Linux, SunOS | | |
| 6.5 | 2004-APR-16 | IRIX, Windows NT, Linux, SunOS | | (needs confirmation exact release date) |
| 7.0 | 2004-SEP-20 | Windows NT, Linux | | Dropped Silicon Graphics IRIX and SunOS |
| 8.0 | 2005-OCT-06 | Windows NT, Linux | $17,000 | |
| 9.0 | 2007-SEP-20 | Windows NT, Linux | | New UI |
| 9.1 | 2008-JAN-30 | Windows NT, Linux | | |
| 9.5 | 2008-JUL-17 | Windows NT, Linux, macOS | | macOS support |
| 10.0 | 2009-APR-16 | Windows NT, Linux, macOS | | Pyro FX |
| 11.0 | 2010-JUL-27 | Windows NT, Linux, macOS | $6,695 | Flip Fluids |
| 12.0 | 2012-MAR-01 | Windows NT, Linux, macOS | | Bullet RBDs |
| 12.1 | 2012-AUG-07 | Windows NT, Linux, macOS | | |
| 12.5 | 2013-MAR-14 | Windows NT, Linux, macOS | | VDB support, Polysoups, Wrangle Nodes |
| 13.0 | 2013-OCT-31 | Windows NT, Linux, macOS | | FEM Solver, Packed Primitives |
| 14.0 | 2015-JAN-15 | Windows NT, Linux, macOS | | PBD Grain Solver, Crowd Tools |
| 15.0 | 2015-OCT-15 | Windows NT, Linux, macOS | | |
| 15.5 | 2016-MAY-19 | Windows NT, Linux, macOS | | |
| 16.0 | 2017-FEB-21 | Windows NT, Linux, macOS | $6,995 | New Network Editor, Node Shapes |
| 16.5 | 2017-NOV-07 | Windows 7 SP1+, Linux, macOS 10.10.2+ | $6,995 | |
| 17.0 | 2018-OCT-10 | Windows 7 SP1+, Linux, macOS 10.11+ | | Vellum |
| 17.5 | 2019-MAR-13 | Windows 7 SP1+, Linux, macOS 10.11+ | | Procedural Dependency Graph |
| 18.0 | 2019-NOV-27 | Windows 8+, Linux, macOS 10.13+ | | Solaris |
| 18.5 | 2020-OCT-17 | Windows 8+, Linux, macOS 10.13+ | | KineFX |
| 19.0 | 2021-OCT-27 | Windows 8+, Linux, macOS 10.13+ | $6,995 | Karma, CFX |
| 19.5 | 2022-JUL-21 | Windows 8+, Linux, macOS 10.15+ | $6,995 | |
| 20.0 | 2023-NOV-8 | Windows 8.1+, Linux, macOS 11+ | $6,995 | KarmaXPU, APEX |
| 20.5 | 2024-JUL-10 | Windows 10+, Linux, macOS 11+ | | Copernicus |
| 21.0 | 2025-AUG-27 | Windows 10+, Linux, macOS 11+ | $4,495 | KineFX motion Mixer, OTIS |
| 22.0 | 2026-JUL-15 | | | |

== Features ==
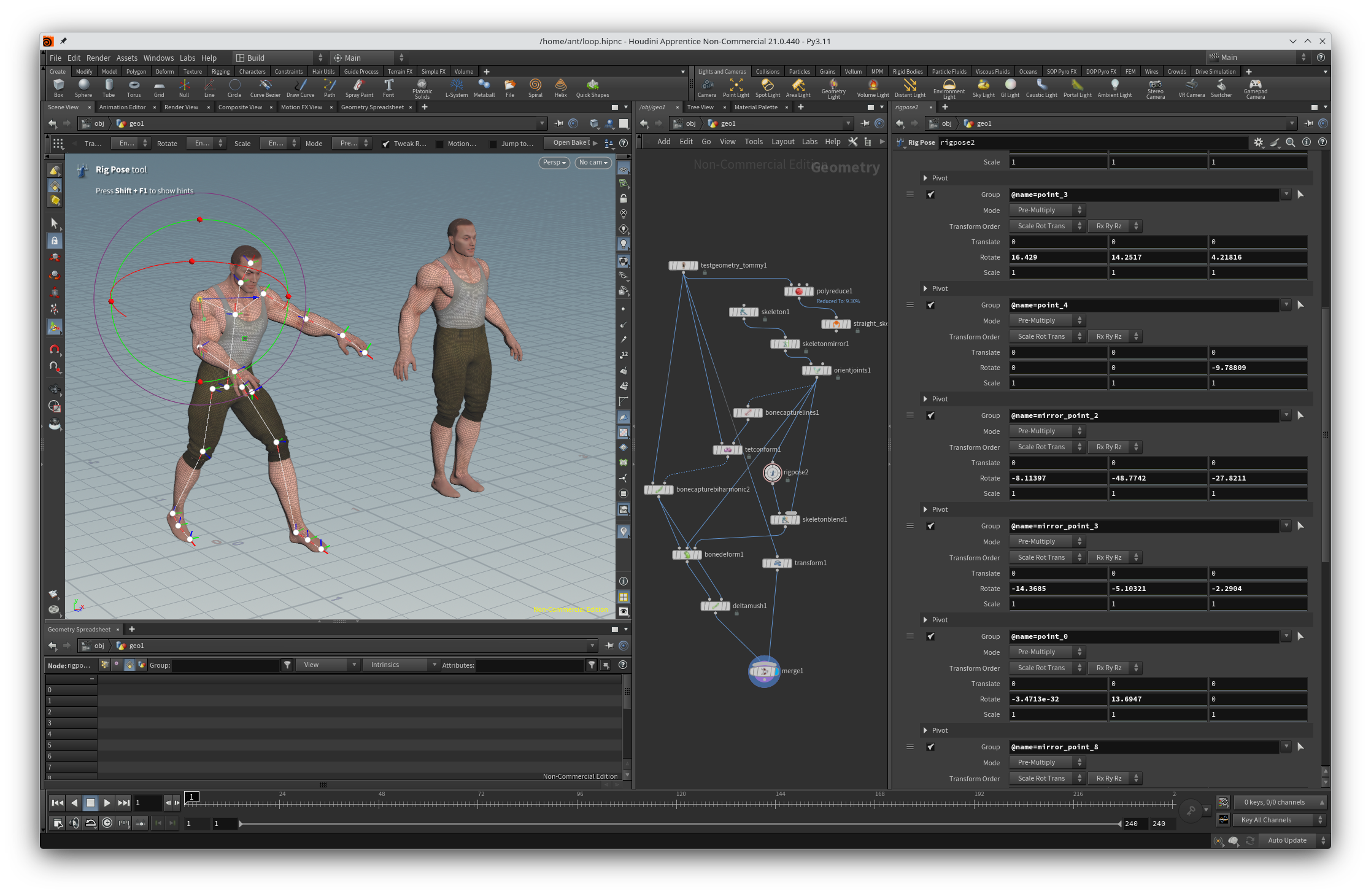
SideFX Houdini 21 user interface

Houdini covers all the major areas of 3D production, including:

- Modeling – All standard geometry entities including Polygons, (Hierarchical) NURBS/Bézier Curves/Patches & Trims, Metaballs and Voxels including SDF, and heightfield interpretations of voxel values, along with standard 'density' (like a 'fog' or dust-like interpretation of voxel values). This is not an exhaustive list.
- Animation – Keyframed animation and raw channel manipulation (CHOPs), motion capture support. CHOPs can also read and process audio files, which might be used for example to create audio-based animation-curves.
- Rigging - proprietary KineFX and APEX systems support in-viewport performant (near-or-beyond-realtime) animation workflows.
- Particles (many different solvers ranging from very simple forces to MPM).
- Dynamics – Rigid Body Dynamics, Fluid Dynamics, Wire Dynamics, Cloth Simulation, Crowd simulation, FLIP and MPM.
- Lighting – node-based shader authoring, lighting and re-lighting in an IPR viewer (in Solaris).
- Rendering – Houdini ships with SideFX's rendering engines Mantra and Karma; Houdini Indie license and up support 3rd party rendering engines, such as PRMan, Octane, 3Delight, Arnold, Redshift, V-ray, and Maxwell.
- Volumetrics – With its native CloudFx and PyroFx toolsets, Houdini can create clouds, smoke and fire simulations.
- Compositing – full compositor of floating-point deep (layered) images. A new GPU-accelerated compositing context called 'Copernicus' is available since Houdini 20.5.
- Plugin Development – development libraries for user extensibility.

Houdini is an open environment and supports a variety of scripting APIs. Python is increasingly the scripting language of choice for the package, and is intended to substitute its original C Shell-like scripting language, HScript. However, any major scripting languages which support socket communication can interface with Houdini.

== Tools ==
=== Operators ===
Houdini's procedural nature is found in its operators. Digital assets are generally constructed by connecting sequences of operators (or OPs). This proceduralism has several advantages: it allows users to construct highly detailed geometric or organic objects in comparatively very few steps; it enables and encourages non-linear development; and new operators can be created in terms of existing operators, a flexible alternative to non-procedural scripting often relied on in other packages for customisation. Houdini uses this procedural generation in production of textures, shaders, particles, "channel data" (data used to drive animation), rendering and compositing.

=== Operator Categories ===
Houdini's operator-based structure is divided into several main groups:

- OBJs – The 'Object' context should be considered as Houdini's 'classic' (or legacy) scene-objects area and contains nodes that usually pass transform information down when wired together (Traditionally these are things like cameras, lights, and geometry subnetworks that contain Sops, but Object would have also been used for rigging in Houdini in the past.) This has nowadays been deprecated in preference to assembling the scene in Lops (ie using USD/Solaris). It is worth noting here that a subnetwork of nearly any category can be created within any other category in Houdini. So, for example a Ropnet inside a Sopnet inside an Object Subnetwork, would be totally valid.
- SOPs – Surface Operators – for generic geometry processing, procedural modelling and some types of simulations.
- POPs – Particle Operators – used to manipulate particles systems.
- CHOPs – Channel Operators – for procedural animation and audio manipulation.
- COPs – Composite Operators – used to perform compositing on footage/image sequences or generate/bake images based on results from the scene.
- DOPs – Dynamic Operators – for dynamic simulations for fluids, cloth, rigid bodies (bullet) etc.
- SHOPs – Shading Operator – Legacy context for representing/authoring materials for different renderers. Note this context has been replaced by 'matnet' material contexts more recently and SHOPs is now considered deprecated.
- ROPs – render operators – for building networks to represent different render passes and render dependencies. This can include any number of steps of processing and is not restricted to pixel-production.
- VOPs – VEX operators – for building sub-networks of nodes of many of the above-mentioned types that execute using a highly optimized SIMD architecture. Examples include the 'Attribute Vop' and 'Volume Vop' Sops, the 'Gas Field Vop' and 'Pop Vop' Dop nodes, there are many other examples throughout houdini that allow one to write code using nodes.
- TOPs - Task Operators
- LOPs - Lighting Operators - for generating USD describing characters, props, lighting, and rendering.

=== Operator Wiring and Processing ===
Operators (nodes) are connected/wired together in networks. In some of the contexts such as Sops, Cops and Chops, data can be thought of as flowing through the wires, manipulated by each operator in turn. In other contexts the network connections represent other relationships such as 'attachment' (Dops) or 'ordering' (Rops and Tops).

Houdini can generate, process and write out many types of data, including 3D geometry, voxel, bitmap images, particles, dynamics, shader algorithms, animation, audio, or a combination of these and custom formats. This node graph architecture is similar (in some contexts) to that employed in node-based compositors such as Shake or Nuke.

=== Houdini Digital Assets ===
Complex networks can be grouped into a single meta-operator node which behaves like a class definition, this is known as a 'Houdini Digital Asset' or HDA (legacy users might also know the name 'OTL' which stands for "Operator Type Library" - essentially a collection of HDAs in one file). These user-defined node-types can be instantiated in other networks (of compatible category) like any other node. In this way users can create their own sophisticated tools without much need for programming.

Houdini can be regarded as a highly interactive visual programming toolkit which makes results much more accessible to artists by connecting nodes, reducing the need to write code.

=== Hard to Learn ===
Houdini’s toolset is largely implemented through operators, which can result in a steeper learning curve compared to similar tools. It is not always practical to understand every node type; instead, effective use of Houdini involves representing creative outcomes as networks of nodes. Experienced users are typically familiar with a range of common approaches (network structures similar to algorithms) that produce desired results. The flexibility provided by lower-level building blocks supports both artistic and technical workflows. Proficiency in Houdini often requires time, practice, and access to mentorship.

==== Conversely ====
Within large productions, the development of a procedural network to solve a specific element creation challenge can make automation much easier. Many studios that use Houdini on large feature effects, and senior Houdini artists/TDs at game studios and feature animation companies develop libraries of procedures (usually embodied as HDAs) that can be used to automate the generation of many of the elements for the film or game, with almost no need for regular-artists to edit the underlying (more complex) setup to get an approval for their work.

=== IO ===
Also unique to Houdini is the range of I/O OPs available to animators, including MIDI devices, raw files or TCP connections, audio devices (including built-in phoneme and pitch detection), mouse cursor position, and so on. Of particular note is Houdini's ability to work with audio, including sound and music synthesis and spatial 3D sound processing tools. These operators exist in the context called "CHOPs" for which Side Effects won a Technical Achievement Academy Award in 2002.

=== Vex ===
VEX (Vector Expression) is one of Houdini's internal languages. It is similar to the Renderman Shading Language. Using VEX a user can develop custom SOPs, POPs, shaders, etc. The current implementation of VEX utilizes SIMD-style processing.

== Rendering ==
Houdini (since 2019) is bundled with two production-class renderers:

Mantra, which had many similarities to RenderMan in its scope and application in its initial incarnation. Micropolygon rendering is supported in addition to path tracing, allowing high-quality displacement operations as well as traditional scan-line and raytracing modes.

And Karma: A more modern, purely path tracing-based renderer that is geared towards the consumption of USD scene data for the production of images using the USD-centric 'Solaris' context (also known as Lops) in Houdini.

The Solaris viewport utilizes a 'hydra delegate' that provides an IPR (interactive preview render) of the USD scene, and allows the delegation of rendering to any installed Hydra/USD-compatible renderer, such as PRman, Arnold and others. SideFX Karma includes an 'XPU' variant that is able to utilize both GPU and CPU compute resources at once in order to render an image much faster than can be achieved with a pure-CPU process.

Shaders are scriptable and composed in their VEX language, or by using VOPs; SideFX's node-based interface to programming VEX. Mantra and Karma (as Houdini itself does) support opening point-clouds or voxel fields (including VDBs) in a shader at render-time, which can have similar applications to brickmaps in Renderman. Back when compute resources where more scarce (like in the 90's and early 00's), this allowed more complicated light interactions such as sub-surface scattering and ambient occlusion, to be produced with lower computational overhead. However these approaches are usually catered-for by path-tracing approaches nowadays.

Mantra can perform extremely fast volume rendering, and both Mantra and Karma use physically-based path-tracing – a technique which attempts to more accurately model the physical interactions of light and materials.

== TouchDesigner ==
Derivative Inc. is a spin-off of Side Effects Software that markets a derivative of Houdini called TouchDesigner. Tailored toward real-time OpenGL-generated animation, it was used on rock group Rush's 30th-anniversary tour to produce dynamic graphics driven directly by the musicians. TouchDesigner was also used by Xite Labs (formerly V Squared Labs) to create live visuals for Amon Tobin's ISAM installation tour.

== Production ==
Some early works in which Houdini was used include the 1997 Contact movie and 2016 Zootopia., but now the number of productions (including lots of games) that use Houdini would be too many to list here.

== See also ==
- Alias Maya
- Blender
- Cinema 4D
- IRIX OS
- List of 3D animation software
- Pixar RenderMan
- Silicon Graphics, Inc.
- Softimage 3D
