= Zachary Lieberman =

American artist (born 1977)

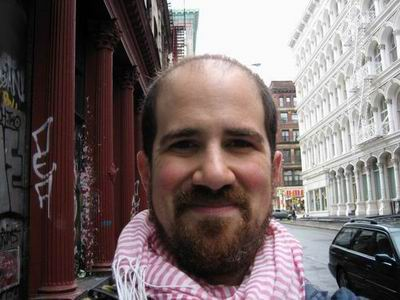
- Born: 1977 (age 48–49)
- Education: Parsons School of Design, Hunter College
- Known for: interactive art, programming, video, digital art
- Website: http://zach.li/

Zachary Lieberman is an American new media artist, designer, computer programmer, and educator.

== Early life and education ==
Born in 1977, Lieberman holds a B.A. in Fine Arts from Hunter College and both a B.F.A. and M.F.A. in Design and Technology from Parsons School of Design.

== Work ==
Lieberman's work has appeared in numerous exhibitions around the world, including Ars Electronica, Futuresonic, CeBIT, and the Off Festival.

He collaborated with artist Golan Levin on the interactive audiovisual project "Messa Di Voce".

With Theo Watson and Arturo Castro, he created openFrameworks, an open source C++ library for creative coding and graphics.

Lieberman has held residencies at Ars Electronica Futurelab, Eyebeam, Dance Theater Workshop, and the Hangar Center for the Arts in Barcelona. In 2013, he co-founded the School for Poetic Computation, a hybrid of a school, residency and research group in New York City.

His work uses technology in a playful way to break down the fragile boundary between the visible and the invisible. His art work focuses around computer graphics, human-computer interaction, and computer vision.

He teaches graphics programming classes at Parsons School of Design. He leads the Future Sketches group at the MIT Media Lab.

== Awards & distinctions ==
- 2018: Maryland Institute College of Art, William O. Steinmetz ’50, Designer-in-Residence.
- 2010: AOL, 25x25 artist grant
- 2010: Golden Nica in Interactive Art for the project Eyewriter, Prix Ars Electronica. Shared with James Powderly, Tony Quan, Evan Roth, Chris Sugrue (US) and Theo Watson (UK).
- 2010: Number 36, of the "100 Most Creative People in Business", Fast Company
- 2009: Artist's Grant, New York State Council on the Arts
- 2008: Honorary Mention at Ars Electronica in the Interactive Art category, for the OpenFrameworks project, shared with Theo Watson
- 2006: Award, CynetArt competition.
- 2006: Award of Distinction, Ars Electronica 2006 Prix.
- 2005: Artist's Grant, New York State Council on the Arts
- 2005: Nominee, Artist of the Year, 6th Annual WIRED magazine Rave Award
- 2004: Honorable Mention, Interactive Art, Prix Ars Electronica 2004
