= Amber Frid-Jimenez =

- Born: 1974 (age 51–52)
- Education: Wesleyan University (BA, Fine Art and Philosophy), MIT (MAS, Media Arts and Sciences)
- Occupations: Artist and designer
- Website: https://amberfj.com

Amber Frid-Jimenez (born 1974) is an interdisciplinary artist, designer, and researcher, who has experimented with deep-learning algorithms to create artworks since 2015. Frid-Jimenez's art practice focuses on how images are created and circulated through emerging media technologies within the digital environment, investigating critical social issues such as the politics of visual representation and surveillance. From installations and large-scale digital prints to participatory performances in virtual platforms, her work explores the roles of design and technology that have mediated the image-making process in contemporary society and art world.

== Career ==
Frid-Jimenez holds her bachelor's degree in fine art and philosophy from Wesleyan University, and received her Science Masters in Media Arts and Sciences from the MIT Media Lab. She is an associate professor at Emily Carr University of Art + Design. She has taught at the Massachusetts Institute of Technology, the Rhode Island School of Design, and the Bergen National Academy of Art & Design.

From 2014 to 2024, Frid-Jimenez served as Canada Research Chair in art and design technology from 2014 to 2024. She is a founding director of an artistic research lab, The Studio for Extensive Aesthetics, co-located with the graduate programme at the Emily Carr university. She is a partner at the design and research studio AFJD, based in Vancouver.

== Selected artworks ==
Frid-Jimenez's major projects include Untitled (tree diagram no. 1) (2009), This is Not a Test (2016), and Ballet Mecanique series (2018-22).

Untitled (tree diagram no. 1) is an inkjet print on Hahnemuhle paper, created through the machine learning model based on clustering. This model was generated by Frid-Jimenez to translate the recurring and cyclical semantic structures in James Joyce's novel Finnegan's Wake (1939), which resulted in the image of intricate drawing that resembles the rings of a tree.

This is Not a Test is a multi-media installation commissioned for the exhibition MashUp: The Birth of Modern Culture exhibition at the Vancouver Art Gallery in 2016. The work consisted of multiple sculptural objects arranged across the room, including the standard images and virtual objects used to test and develop digital image processing algorithms, such as image of Lena Söderberg from the 1972 Playboy magazine; the rabbit head pertaining to the Stanford Bunny; and a mirrored sphere included in the Cornell Box designed for 3D modelling test. This is Not a Test also poses a dialogue between a third wave feminist perspective and a post-feminist one on the society of new media, respectively referring to Jessica Valenti and Nina Power. The installation includes a sculptural object showing an excerpt from Nina Power's One Dimensional Woman.

Ballet Méchanique series refers to Fernand Léger and Dudley Murphy's modernist film Ballet Méchanique (1924) that depicted the musical instruments magically coming to life. For the video work Burning Ballet Méchanique (2018), Frid-Jimenez used sequential frames taken from the original film to train an AI model that automatically comprised a new film as a result. Utilizing the output of this algorithm, she also created a double-sided screen object titled After Ballet Méchanique (2018-22).

== Selected exhibitions ==
=== Solo exhibitions ===
- V XXXX – something slips, passes, is transmitted, from stage to stage, Mónica Reyes Gallery, Vancouver, 2023
- Underneath Each Picture There Is Always Another Picture, The Cabinet, SFU School for the Contemporary Arts, Vancouver, 2024-25

=== Group exhibitions ===
- Latent Stare, Casco Art Institute, Utrecht, 2012
- Mashup: The Birth of Modern Culture, Vancouver Art Gallery, Vancouver, 2016
- zero, ground, Griffin Art Projects, 2018
- A Dream and a Drive: Circles, Dots, Os and Zerosis, Mónica Reyes Gallery, Vancouver, 2019
- The Imitation Game: Visual Culture in the Age of Artificial Intelligence, Vancouver Art Gallery, Vancouver, 2022
- If the stars make patterns, can our scripts unfold forever? Mónica Reyes Gallery, Vancouver, 2025
- Structure of Smoke, Morris and Helen Belkin Art Gallery, Vancouver, 2026
- Love Letter, Mónica Reyes Gallery, Vancouver, 2026

== Selected bibliography ==
=== Publications and Writings by Frid-Jimenez ===
La Lucha Sin Fin: On Charisma and Its Persuasive Technologies. Jan van Eyck Academie, 2012.

"Anonymous Unarchive" in MashUp: The Birth of Modern Culture, ed. Augaitis, Daina, Bruce Grenville and Stephanie Rebick (Black Dog Publishing, 2016), 294-7.
