= Golan Levin =

American artist

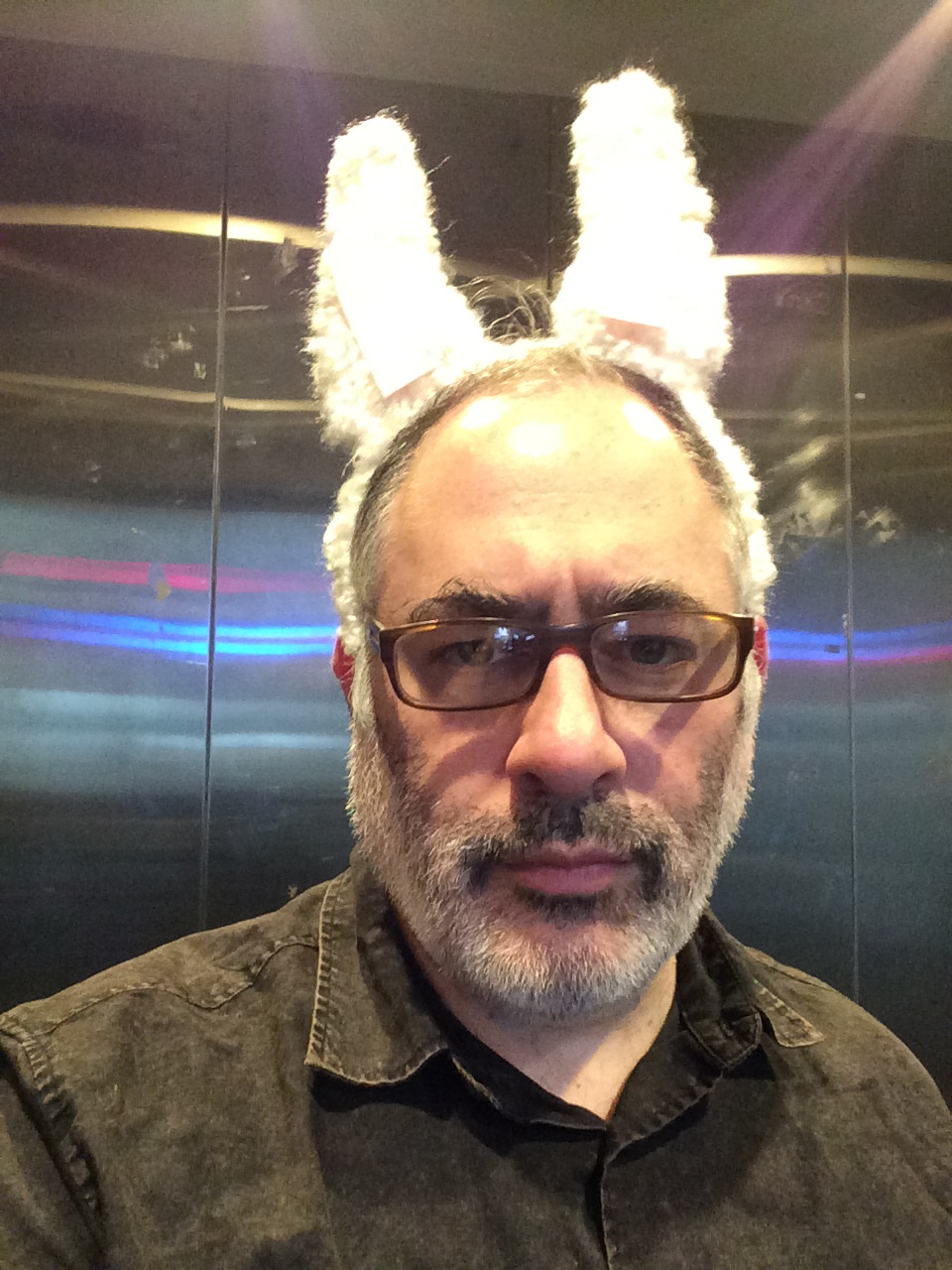
- iPhone self-portrait by Golan Levin (2019)
- Born: 1972 (age 53–54); New York City
- Occupations: Composer, multimedia artist, performance artist, university teacher, engineer
- Employer: Carnegie Mellon University
- Awards: Prix Ars Electronica (2000, 2002, 2012)
- Website: flong.com

Golan Levin (born 1972) is an American new media artist, composer, performer and engineer interested in developing artifacts and events which explore supple new modes of reactive expression.

== Career ==
Levin received a self-designed bachelor's degree in Art and Design at the Massachusetts Institute of Technology (MIT) in 1994, and a master's degree in Media Arts and Sciences from the MIT Media Lab in 2000, as a student in John Maeda's Aesthetics and Computation Group (ACG). Between degrees, Levin worked as an interface designer at Paul Allen's Interval Research Corporation, where he was introduced to the field of interactive new media art by Michael Naimark, Brenda Laurel, and Scott Snibbe, among others. Levin was an Eyebeam resident in 2002 and 2003.

After his graduate work at MIT, Levin taught computational design in various schools in New York City, including Columbia University, Cooper Union, and Parsons School of Design before accepting a position at Carnegie Mellon University (CMU) in 2004.

From 2009 to 2023, Levin also held the position of Director of the Frank-Ratchye STUDIO for Creative Inquiry at CMU, an interdisciplinary research unit dedicated to supporting projects at the intersection of arts and technology.

Now, Levin is a Professor of Electronic Time Based Art in the CMU School of Art, with courtesy appointments in the CMU School of Computer Science, School of Design, School of Architecture, and Entertainment Technology Center. There, he teaches computation arts and researches new intersections of machine code and visual culture.

== Work ==
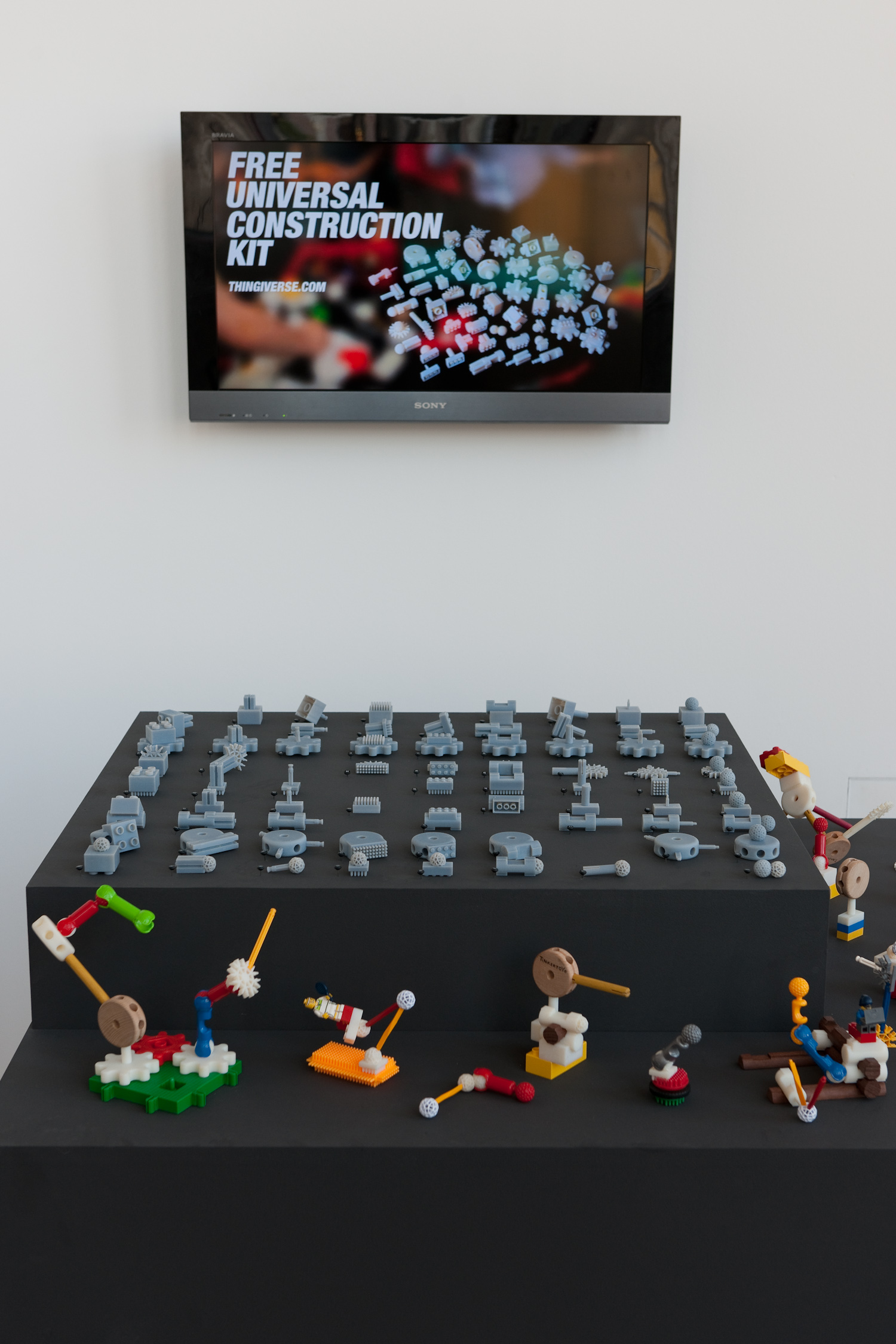
Free Universal Construction Kit by Levin and Shawn Sims, Ars Electronica, Offenes Kulturhaus museum, Linz (2012)

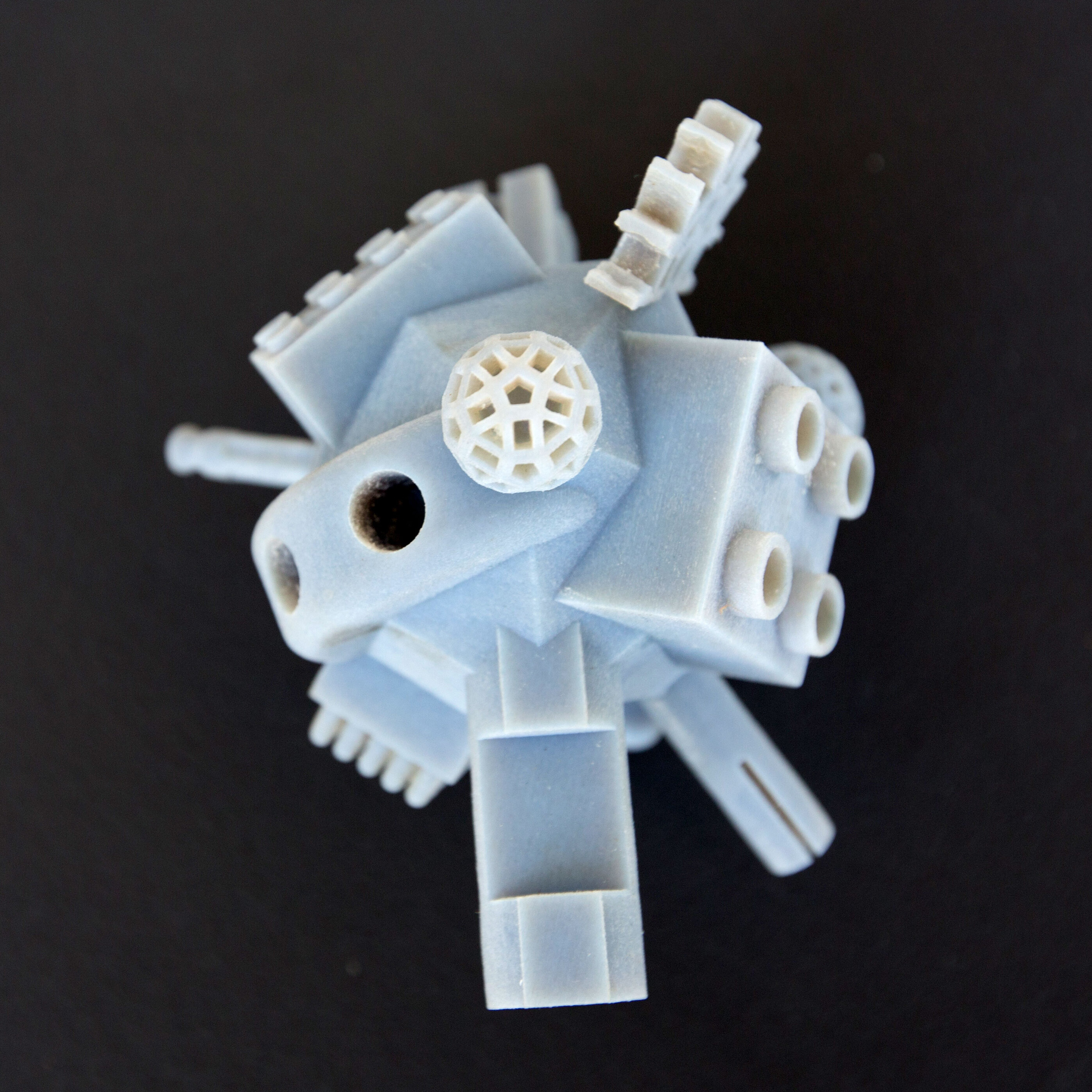
Free Universal Construction Kit (detail)

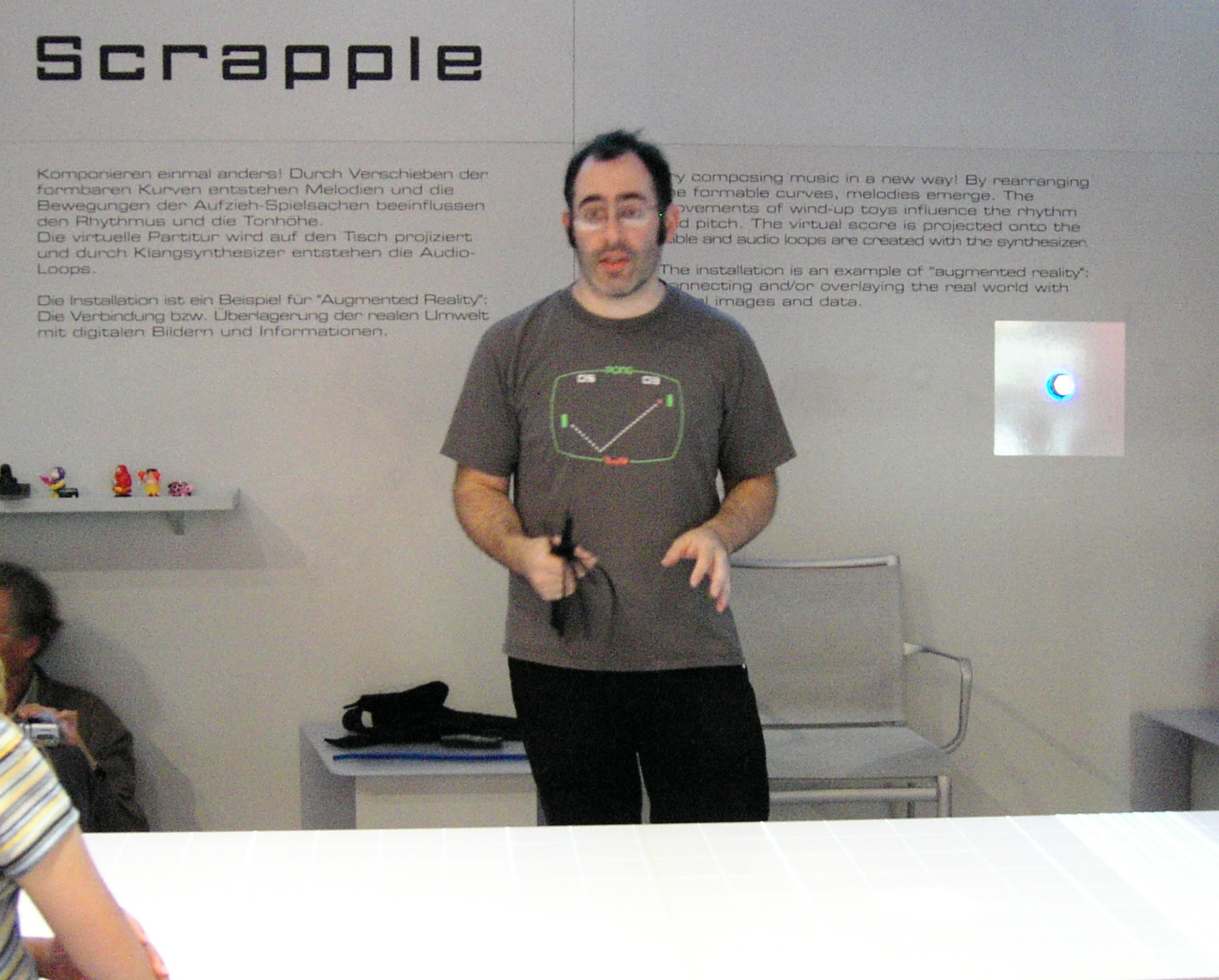
Scrapple

Golan Levin's artwork focuses on the design of systems for the creation, manipulation and performance of simultaneous image and sound, as part of a more general inquiry into formal languages of interactivity and of nonverbal communication in cybernetic systems. Through performances, digital artifacts, and virtual environments, often created with a variety of collaborators, Levin applies creative twists to digital technologies that highlight our relationship with machines, make visible our ways of interacting with each other, and exploring the intersection of abstract communication and interactivity. From 2002 to 2007, Levin and Zachary Lieberman collaborated on a variety of projects together, using the name Tmema to represent their collective work.

Levin's 2012 collaboration with Shawn Sims, a collection of open source 3D-printable adapters for popular toy construction systems called the Free Universal Construction Kit (F.U.C.K.), is in the collection of the Cooper Hewitt, Smithsonian Design Museum, and the Museum of Modern Art (MoMA). The work was also included in MoMA's 2025 exhibition, Pirouette: Turning Points in Design, featuring "widely recognized design icons [...] highlighting pivotal moments in design history," such as the Bean Bag chair, the Sony Walkman portable cassette player, and the NASA Worm insignia.

Levin also led collaborations to develop Terrapattern (2016), an open-ended tool to support visual query-by-example in satellite imagery, and Augmented Hand Series (2014), a real-time interactive software system that presents playful, dreamlike, and uncanny transformations of its visitors' hands.

Levin has exhibited, performed, and lectured widely in Europe, America and Asia. His work has been shown at the New Museum of Contemporary Art, The Kitchen, the Neuberger Museum, and The Whitney Biennial, all in New York City; Ars Electronica in Linz, Austria; The Museum of Contemporary Art in Taipei, Taiwan; The NTT InterCommunication Center in Tokyo, Japan; the Zentrum für Kunst und Medientechnologie in Karlsruhe, Germany; and MoMA, among other venues. His funding credits include grants from Creative Capital, The New York State Council on the Arts, the Pennsylvania Council on the Arts, the Rockefeller MAP Fund, The Greenwall Foundation, the Langlois Foundation, Turbulence.org, and the Arts Council England.

== Projects ==
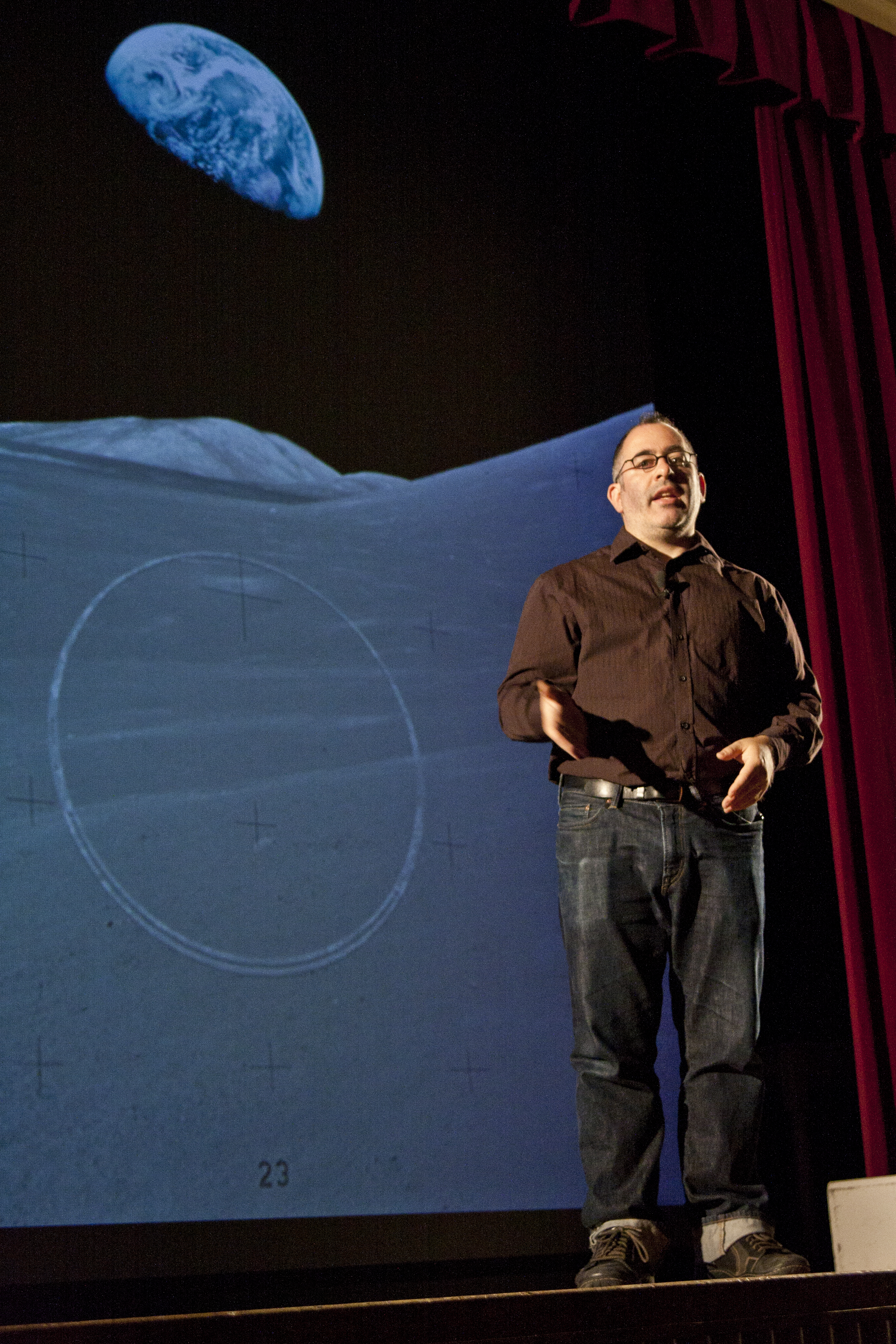
Golan's lecture at Rocky Mountain College of Art and Design

Levin's work combines equal measures of the whimsical, the provocative, and the sublime in a wide variety of online, installation and performance media, including:

- Audiovisual Environment Suite (2000), a set of five interactive systems which allow people to create and perform abstract animation and synthetic sound in real time. It was granted an Award of Distinction in the Prix Ars Electronica (Interactive Art category).
- Scribble (2000), features tightly coupled sounds and dynamic visuals which are at times carefully scored, and at other times loosely improvised. Scribble has been presented in duo and trio formats at global festivals and venues. It is the Audiovisual Environment Suite's accompanying audiovisual performance.
- The Secret Lives of Numbers (2002), an interactive information visualization about the "popularity" of numbers on the World Wide Web, granted an Award of Distinction in the Prix Ars Electronica (Net Art category). Commissioned by Turbulence.org.
- Dialtones: A Telesymphony (2001), a concert whose sounds are wholly performed through the carefully choreographed dialing and ringing of the audience's own mobile phones.
- The Alphabet Synthesis Machine (2002), a genetic algorithm that generates imaginary writing systems. Developed in collaboration with Cassidy Curtis and Johnathan Feinberg.
- Re:MARK (2002), an installation for two participants which presents an interactive visualization of speech, using sounds spoken into a pair of microphones are analyzed and classified by a phoneme recognition system.
- Messa di Voce (2003), installation piece using graphics interacting with sound. It was developed in collaboration with Zachary Lieberman.
- The Manual Input Sessions (2004), a series of audiovisual vignettes which probe the expressive possibilities of hand gestures and finger movements (with Zachary Lieberman)
- Scrapple (2005)
- Ursonography (2005), developed in collaboration with Jaap Blonk
- The Dumpster (2006) interactive information visualization
- Eyecode (2007) installation that reflects the viewer's gaze
- Opto-Isolator (2007) interactive sculpture that looks back at the viewer with a single embedded moving eye
- Rectified flowers (2010) uses a polar-coordinates transform to create "landscapes" from images of flowers
- Free Universal Construction Kit (2012), a matrix of open source 3D-printable adapters to connect various construction toys (with Shawn Sims)
- Augmented Hand Series (2014) real-time interactive software system that presents playful, dreamlike, and uncanny transformations of its visitors' hands

Levin's most recent work centers around interactive robotics, machine vision, and the theme of gaze as a primary new mode for human-machine communication. Levin also did a Ted Talk discussing technology as art.
