= Burak Arıkan =

Turkish contemporary artist (born 1976)

Burak Arikan
- Born: May 28, 1976 (age 50); Istanbul, Turkey
- Education: MIT Media Lab, Massachusetts Institute of Technology in Cambridge.
- Known for: Conceptual art, Software art, Net Art, Generative Art, Digital Art, Data Activism

Burak Arıkan (born in 1976, Istanbul) is a Turkish contemporary artist. His work is based on complex networks and thereby generates data and inputs in the custom abstract machine. Arikan is the founder of Graph Commons, a platform for mapping, analyzing and publishing data-networks. Graph Commons workshop for artists, activists, critical researchers, and civil society organizations are being conducted internationally.

One of Arikan's works MyPocket (2008) is a live software system that predicts what the artist buys every day and discloses his spending records to the world. MyPocket was shown in Neuberger Museum of Art New York, Künstlerhaus Bethanien Berlin, and Media Space / FilmWinter Stuttgart, and most recently in the New Observatory exhibition in FACT Liverpool.

Arikan is an adjunct faculty in Interactive Telecommunications Program, Tisch School of Arts, New York University.

Arikan is a member of Alternative Informatics Association, a civil society organization in Turkey focusing on the issues of Internet freedom and digital rights.

== Education ==
In 2001, he received Bachelor of Science degree in Civil Engineering from Yildiz Technical University. In 2004, he received Master of Arts degree in Visual Communication Design from Istanbul Bilgi University. Arikan completed his master's degree in 2006 at the MIT Media Lab in Massachusetts Institute of Technology in the Physical Language Workshop led by John Maeda.
