= Casey Reas =

American artist

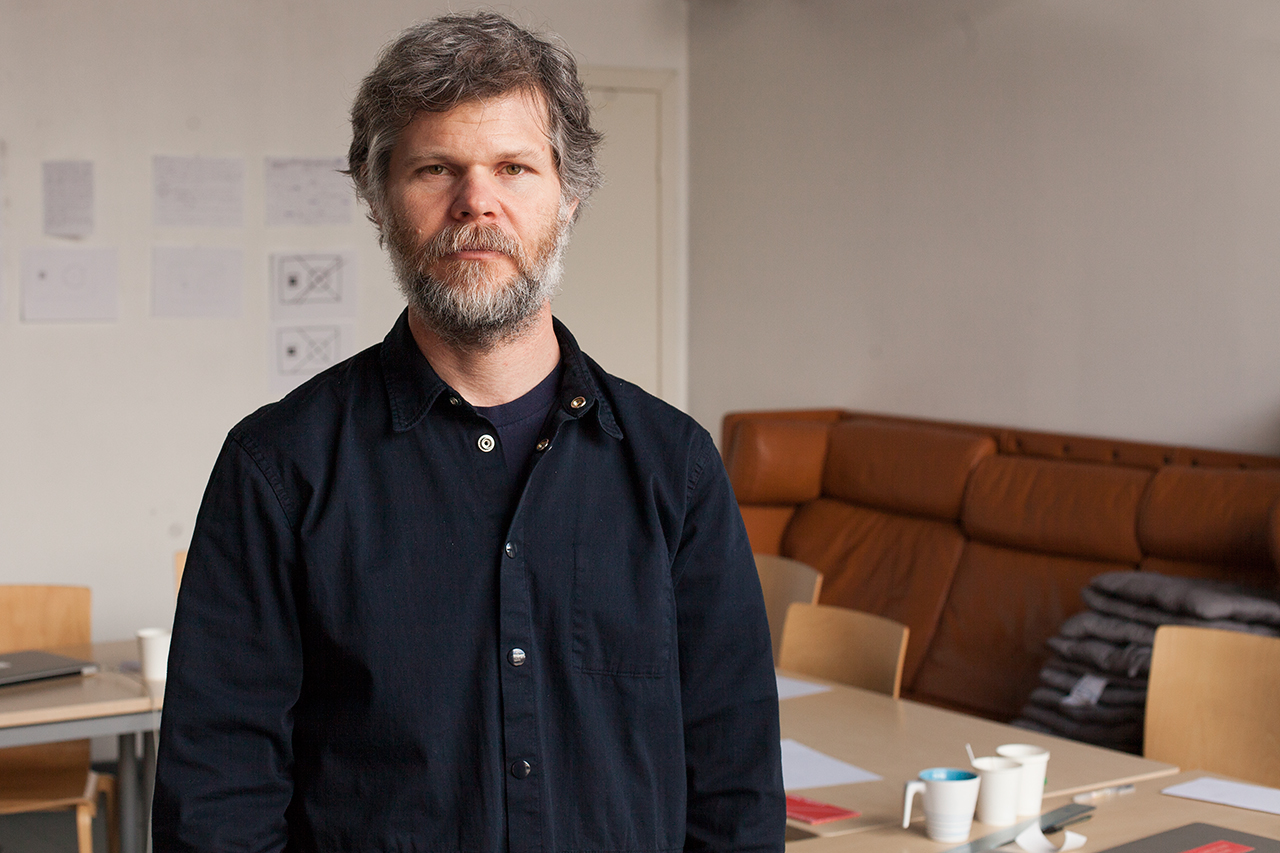
- Born: Casey Edwin Barker Reas; 1972 (age 53–54); Troy, Ohio, US
- Education: University of Cincinnati; Massachusetts Institute of Technology
- Known for: Processing programming language
- Website: reas.com

Casey Edwin Barker Reas (born 1972), also known as C. E. B. Reas or Casey Reas, is an American artist whose conceptual, procedural and minimal artworks explore ideas through the contemporary lens of software. Reas is perhaps best known for having created, with Ben Fry, the Processing programming language.

== Education and early work ==
Reas was born Casey Edwin Barker Reas in 1972 in Troy, Ohio. He studied design at the University of Cincinnati and then spent the next two years developing software and electronics as an artistic exploration. While studying design in Cincinnati, Reas was a member of a band called 'nancy' with Scott Devendorf and Matt Berninger, who went on to become members of The National. Reas went on to direct four music videos for the band's 2017 album, Sleep Well Beast.

In 2001, Reas earned a Master of Science in Media Arts and Sciences as a part of the Aesthetics and Computation Group at the Massachusetts Institute of Technology's MIT Media Lab.

== Art career ==
After graduating, Reas began to exhibit his software and installations internationally in galleries and festivals. Reas's software generated images derive from short software-based instructions that visual create processes. The instructions are expressed in different media including natural language, machine code, and computer simulations, resulting in both dynamic and static images. Each translation reveals a different perspective on the process and combines with the others to produce continually evolving visual traces.

In 2003, Reas moved to Los Angeles where he is currently a Professor in the Department of Design Media Arts at the University of California, Los Angeles.

Since 2012, Reas has incorporated broadcast images into his work, algorithmically distorting them to create abstractions that retain traces of their original, representational function. In 2020, Casey Reas co-founded a platform for showcasing internet art and digital art with curated exhibitions all for sale as non-fungible tokens.

== Processing ==
In 2001, together with MIT PhD candidate Ben Fry, Reas created the Processing programming language. Processing is widely used by thousands of artists and designers worldwide, and by educators teaching the fundamentals of programing in art and design schools.

== Exhibitions ==
He has shown his work at:

- the Whitney Museum of American Art's artport,
- Ars Electronica in Austria,
- ZKM in Germany,
- Transmediale in Berlin,
- GAFFTA in San Francisco,
- Uijeongbu International Digital Art Festival in Korea,
- the Danish Film Institute,
- bitforms gallery in New York and Seoul,
- IAMAS and ICC in Japan,
- the Microwave International Media Art Festival in Hong Kong, and
- the Sónar Festival in Barcelona.

== Public collections ==
Reas' work is held in the following collections:

- The Victoria and Albert Museum
- The Los Angeles County Museum of Art
- The Carl and Marilynn Thoma Art Foundation
- The Mary and Leigh Block Museum of Art
- The Pompidou Centre Paris

== Books ==
- Casey Reas and Benjamin Fry, Processing: A Programming Handbook for Visual Designers and Artists, MIT Press, 2007.
- Casey Reas, A Mathematical Theory of Communication, RRose Editions, 2018
- Casey Reas, Making Pictures with Generative Adversarial Networks, Anteism Books, 2019. ISBN 978-1-926968-47-6

== See also ==
- Timeline of programming languages
- Processing programming language
