= Cinder (programming library) =

Open-source C++ programming library

- Original author(s): Andrew Bell
- Developer(s): Andrew Bell, Hai Nguyen, The Barbarian Group
- Stable release: 0.9.2 / April 13, 2020; 4 years ago
- Repository: github.com/cinder/Cinder
- Written in: C++
- Operating system: Microsoft Windows, OS X, iOS, Linux
- Type: Application framework
- License: Simplified BSD License
- Website: libcinder.org

Cinder is an open-source programming library designed to give the C++ language advanced visualization abilities. It was released as a public tool in spring 2010 and can be viewed in many ways as a C++-based alternative to tools like the Java-based Processing library, Microsoft Silverlight or Adobe Flash. It is also comparable to the C++ based openFrameworks; the main difference is that Cinder uses more system-specific libraries for better performance while openFrameworks affords better control over its underlying libraries.

Unlike Flash and Silverlight, Cinder is generally used in a non-browser environment. This, combined with the speed provided by C++, makes the library more appropriate for heavily abstracted projects, including art installations, commercial campaigns and other advanced animation work.

== See also ==
- Processing (Java)
- openFrameworks (C++)
