= Ben Fry =

American expert in data visualization (born 1975)

Benjamin Fry
- Born: 1975 (age 50–51); Ann Arbor, Michigan
- Occupation: Designer

Benjamin Fry (born 1975) is an American designer with expertise in data and information visualization.

== Early life and education ==
Fry was born in 1975 in Ann Arbor, Michigan. Fry received a Bachelor of Arts (BFA) in communication design, minor in computer science at Carnegie Mellon University. He received Master's degree and Doctor of Philosophy (Ph.D.) degrees from the Aesthetics and Computation Group at the MIT Media Lab, under the direction of John Maeda. His doctoral dissertation, "Computational Information Design" introduces the seven stages of visualizing data: acquiring, parsing, filtering, mining, representing, refining and interacting.

== Career ==
During his time at MIT Media Lab, Fry co-developed Processing, a programming language and integrated development environment (IDE) built for the electronic arts and visual design communities with the purpose of teaching the basics of computer programming in a visual context. It is free and open-source software. The Processing design environment developed together with Casey Reas won a Golden Nica from the Prix Ars Electronica in 2005. During 2006–2007, Fry was the Nierenberg Chair of Design for the Carnegie Mellon School of Design. He is a principal of Fathom, a design and software consultancy in Boston, Massachusetts.

Fry's artwork has been featured in the Cooper-Hewitt Design Triennial (2003, 2006) and the Whitney Biennial (2002), and at the Museum of Modern Art in New York (2001, 2008), Ars Electronica in Linz, Austria (2000, 2002, 2005) and in the films Minority Report and The Hulk. He is the winner of the 2011 National Design Award in category "Interaction Design".

== Books ==
- 2007: (with Casey Reas) Processing: A Programming Handbook for Visual Designers and Artists, MIT Press
- 2007: Visualizing Data, O'Reilly
- 2010: (with Casey Reas) Getting Started with Processing, O'Reilly
- 2015: (with Casey Reas and Lauren McCarthy) Getting Started with p5.js, O'Reilly

== See also ==
- Processing programming language
- Pirouette: Turning Points in Design
- Timeline of programming languages
