= Processing =

Free graphics library

- Paradigm: Object-oriented
- Family: JVM-hosted
- Designed by: Casey Reas, Ben Fry
- Developers: Daniel Shiffman, Processing Foundation
- First appeared: 2001; 25 years ago
- Stable release: 4.5.2 / May 23, 2026; 5 months ago
- Implementation language: Java
- Platform: x86-64, Raspberry Pi
- OS: Unix-like: macOS, Linux, Android; Windows
- License: GPL, LGPL
- Filename extensions: .pde
- Website: processing.org

Influenced
- Arduino, Wiring

Processing is a graphics library and integrated development environment (IDE) built for the electronic arts, new media art, and visual design communities with the purpose of teaching non-programmers the fundamentals of computer programming in a visual context. It is free and open-source software released under a GNU General Public License (GPL) and a GNU Lesser General Public License (LGPL).

Processing uses the Java programming language, with added simplifications such as added classes and aliased mathematical functions and operations. It also provides a graphical user interface to simplify the compiling and executing stage.

The Processing language and IDE are the precursor to other projects including Arduino and Wiring.

== History ==
The project was begun in 2001 by Casey Reas and Ben Fry, both formerly of the Aesthetics and Computation Group at the MIT Media Lab. In 2012, they founded the Processing Foundation along with Daniel Shiffman, who joined as a third project lead. Johanna Hedva joined the Foundation in 2014 as Director of Advocacy.

Originally, Processing had used the domain name proce55ing.net, in leet spelling, because the name processing was taken; Reas and Fry eventually acquired the domain processing.org and moved the project to it in 2004. While the original name had a combination of letters and numbers, it was always officially referred to as processing, but the abbreviated term p5 is still used occasionally (e.g., in "p5.js") in reference to the old domain name.

In 2012, the Processing Foundation was established and received 501(c)(3) nonprofit status, supporting the community around the tools and ideas that started with the Processing Project. The foundation encourages people around the world to meet annually in local events named Processing Community Day.

== Features ==
Processing IDE
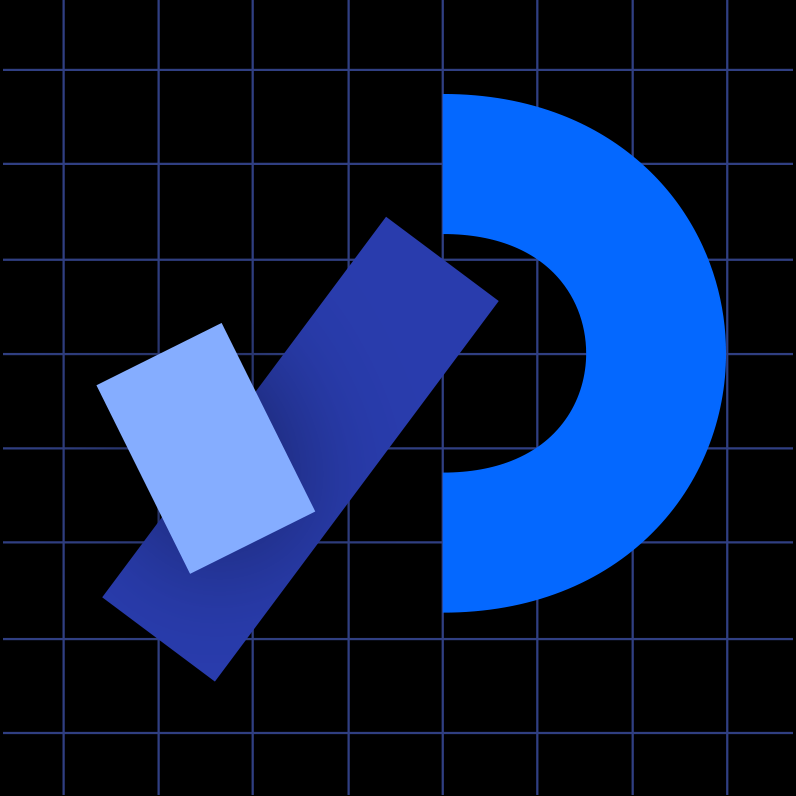

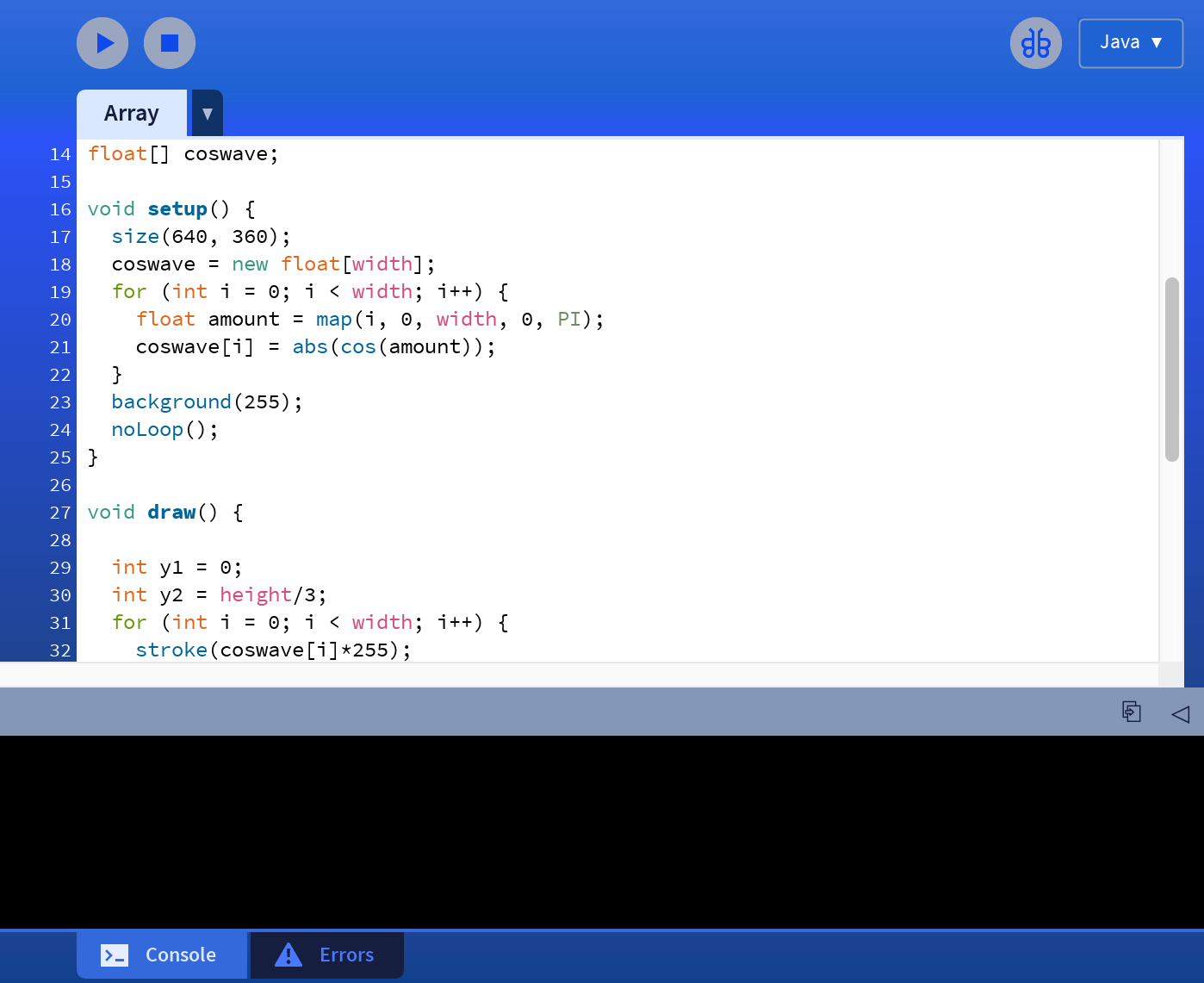
- Screenshot of Processing's integrated development environment.
- Stable release: 4.3 / July 26, 2023; 3 years ago
- Written in: Java, GLSL, JavaScript
- Operating system: Cross-platform
- Type: Integrated development environment
- Website: processing.org
- Repository: github.com/processing/processing4

Processing includes a sketchbook, a minimal alternative to an integrated development environment (IDE) for organizing projects.

Every Processing sketch is actually a subclass of the PApplet Java class (formerly a subclass of Java's built-in Applet) which implements most of the Processing language's features.

When programming in Processing, all added classes defined will be treated as inner classes when the source code is translated into pure Java before compiling. This means that the use of static variables and methods in classes is prohibited unless Processing is explicitly told to code in pure Java mode.

Processing also allows for users to create their own classes within the PApplet sketch. This allows for complex data types that can include any number of arguments and avoids the limitations of solely using standard data types such as: int (integer), char (character), float (real number), and color (RGB, RGBA, hex).

== Examples ==
The simplest possible version of a "Hello, world" program in Processing is:

// This prints "Hello World." to the IDE console.
println("Hello World.");

However, due to the more visually oriented nature of Processing, the following code is a better example of the look and feel of the language.

// Hello mouse.
void setup() {
  size(400, 400);
  stroke(255);
  background(192, 64, 0);
}

void draw() {
  line(150, 25, mouseX, mouseY);
}

== Awards ==
In 2005 Reas and Fry won the Golden Nica award from Ars Electronica in its Net Vision category for their work on Processing.

Ben Fry won the 2011 National Design Award given by the Smithsonian Cooper-Hewitt National Design Museum in the category of Interaction Design. The award statement says:

"Drawing on a background in graphic design and computer science, Ben Fry pursues a long-held fascination with visualizing data. As Principal of Fathom Information Design in Boston, Fry develops software, printed works, installations, and books that depict and explain topics from the human genome to baseball salaries to the evolution of text documents. With Casey Reas, he founded the Processing Project, an open-source programming environment for teaching computational design and sketching interactive-media software. It provides artists and designers with accessible means of working with code while encouraging engineers and computer scientists to think about design concepts."

== License ==
Processing's core libraries, the code included in exported applications and applets, is licensed under the GNU Lesser General Public License, so users can release original code with a choice of license.

The IDE is licensed under the GNU General Public License.

== Related projects ==
=== Design By Numbers ===
Processing was based on the original work done on Design By Numbers project at MIT. It shares many of the same ideas and is a direct child of that experiment.

=== p5.js ===
p5.js Logo

In 2013, Lauren McCarthy created p5.js, a native JavaScript alternative to Processing.js that has the official support of the Processing Foundation. p5.js gained over 1.5 million users.

Since April 2022, p5.js has been led by Qianqian Ye, an Adjunct Associate Professor of Media Arts at USC.

=== ml5.js ===
ml5.js is a p5.js library developed by NYU's ITP/IMA with funding and support provided by a Google Education grant.

Daniel Shiffman has made videos demonstrating ml5 and is a notable code contributor.

=== Processing.js ===
Processing.js is a discontinued JavaScript port that enabled existing Processing Java code to run on web.

It was released first in 2008 by John Resig. The project was later run through a partnership between the Mozilla Foundation and Seneca College, led by David Humphrey, Al MacDonald, and Corban Brook. Processing.js was kept at parity with Processing up to its API version 2.1 release.

The project was discontinued in December 2018, two years after its active development had stopped.

=== P5Py ===
p5 is a Python library providing high level drawing functions to quickly create simulations and interactive art using Python. It combines the core ideas of Processing – learning to code in a visual context – with Python's readability to make programming more accessible to beginners, educators, and artists.

=== Processing.py ===
Python Mode for Processing, or Processing.py is a Python interface to the underlying Java toolkit. It was chiefly developed by Jonathan Feinberg starting in 2010, with contributions from James Gilles and Ben Alkov.

=== py5 ===
py5 is a version of Processing for Python 3.8+. It makes the Java Processing jars available to the CPython interpreter using JPype. It can do just about everything Processing can do, except with Python instead of Java code.

=== Wiring, Arduino, and Fritzing ===
Processing has spawned another project, Wiring, which uses the Processing IDE with a set of libraries written in the C++ language as a way to teach artists how to program microcontrollers. Two separate hardware projects now exist, Wiring and Arduino, using the Wiring environment and language. Fritzing is another software environment of similar sort, to help designers and artists document their interactive prototypes and advance from physical prototyping to ready product.

=== Mobile Processing ===
Another spin-off project, now defunct, is Mobile Processing by Francis Li, which allowed software written using the Processing language and environment to run on Java powered mobile devices. Today some of the same functionality is provided by Processing itself.

=== iProcessing ===
iProcessing was built to help people develop native iPhone applications using the Processing language. It is an integration of the Processing.js library and a Javascript application framework for iPhone.

=== Spde ===
Spde (Scala Processing Development Environment) replaces Processing's reduced Java syntax and custom preprocessor with the off-the-shelf Scala programming language which also runs on the Java platform and enforces some of the same restrictions such as disallowing static methods, while also allowing more concise code, and supporting functional programming.

=== JRubyArt ===
JRubyArt (formerly named ruby-processing) is a wrapper library for Processing in the Ruby language, that runs on the Java platform using JRuby.

=== Quil ===
Quil is an interactive animation library for Clojure and ClojureScript based on Processing.

=== Sketch ===
Sketch is a Common Lisp library highly inspired by Processing.

== Media ==
The music video for "House of Cards" by Radiohead was created using Processing combined with data from lidar technology, along with using acrylic glass and mirrors to create scenes in which the image appears distorted, partially disappears, or disintegrate as if being carried by wind. The textile artist Libs Elliott uses Processing to design partly randomised geometric quilts. Processing has also been used to create illustrations for publications such as Nature and The New York Times, to output sculptures for gallery exhibitions, to control huge video walls and to knit sweaters.

== See also ==
- Cinder (programming library) (C++)
- OpenFrameworks (C++)
- JavaFX
- Max (software)
- Codea
