= Lindsay Howard =

American curator

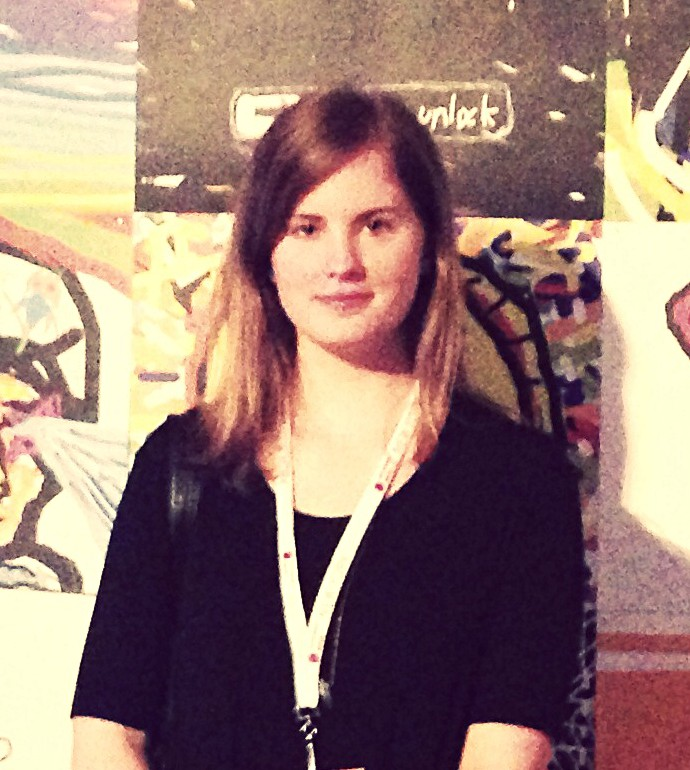
- Education: Bennington College
- Occupation: Curator
- Movement: Net Art, Digital Art, Post-Internet
- Website: lindsayhoward.net

Lindsay Howard is an American curator, writer, and new media scholar based in New York City whose work explores how the internet is shaping art and culture.

Her exhibitions focus on social dynamics and aesthetics within online communities, as well as transparency, hacktivism, and collaborations between artists and technologists.

== Education ==
Howard completed her bachelor's degree in Literature at Bennington College in Bennington, Vermont.

== Career ==
Howard started her career by founding the exhibition program at 319 Scholes, an organization and collective of artists, curators, writers, hackers, coders, and activists based in Brooklyn, New York. 319 Scholes focused on digital arts and interdisciplinary explorations of networked culture, especially the role of technology in everyday life, and promoted a “new era of openness and transparency in curatorial practice.” The exhibitions, workshops, and screenings at 319 Scholes contributed to the Net Art and Post-Internet Art movements.

Howard's first exhibition was DUMP.FM IRL which showcased work created by users of DUMP.FM, an image-based chat room for real-time communication co-founded by artist Ryder Ripps. Of the exhibition, critic Paddy Johnson wrote: “The collective picture formed was that of a unique community of makers, each using a lexicon of stock images, internet slang and animated gifs. This is the new art we've been waiting to see for the last 30 years.” Johnson named the exhibition one of the “10 Best Exhibitions of 2010.”

Howard curated Paddles ON! at Phillips, the inaugural digital art sales at a major international auction house. The auctions focused on artists who have pioneered innovative monetization models that reflect the democratic values of the internet generation. Paddles ON! featured the first art website to ever be auctioned: digital artist Rafaël Rozendaal's ifnoyes.com, which sold for $3,500 using the Art Website Sales Contract. Artist Petra Cortright used a view-based algorithm to price her video work, which resulted in her 24-second YouTube film selling for $3,200. Artist Molly Soda sold a YouTube webcam performance for $1,500. The New York Times wrote: “Digital art has become an accepted part of every biennial and international art fair, but the form is still the punk rock of the art world."

Howard is a founding member of Deep Lab, "cyberfeminist research" project, along with Addie Wagenknecht, Kate Crawford, Claire L. Evans, Simone Browne, and Jillian York. She curated an exhibition of Deep Lab's work and a series of public programming at the New Museum in 2015.

Howard established an online commissioning program where she worked with artists Shia Labeouf, Sougwen Chung, Eilis McDonald, Alexandra Gorczynski, Morehshin Allahyari, and Jacob Ciocci.

In 2016, Howard released a body of research called Temporary Highs, which looks at how the structure of the internet enables reward-seeking behavior in a compulsive cycle of oversharing and consumption. Howard's writings examine the pleasure and anxiety of immediate gratification, as well as the constant search for validation, understanding, and connection. She presented Temporary Highs at SAIC, Oberlin College & Conservatory, and PNCA.

In 2017, the New Museum invited Howard to produce the 50th anniversary of Experiments in Art and Technology program with Nokia Bell Labs. Howard worked with artists Sougwen Chung and Lisa Park as they collaborated with engineers to create large-scale art installations using Bell Labs' Motion Engine, which offers a way to visually analyze complex natural and manmade systems, as well as Bell Labs' advanced research into sensor technology.

=== F.A.T. ===
From 2012–2013, Howard was the Curatorial Fellow at Eyebeam Art & Technology Center. While at Eyebeam, Howard curated F.A.T. Gold: Five Years of Free Art & Technology, a retrospective of F.A.T. Lab, an organization that's “part artist collective, part hacktivist cell, and part Silicon Valley think tank." The exhibition presented works from the collective's history as well as new commissions, such as Ideas Worth Spreading by Evan Roth and 3D printed artworks. F.A.T. Lab members, including Addie Wagenknecht, Chris Poole (or 'moot'), Geraldine Juárez, Jamie Wilkinson, Jonah Peretti, Becky Stern, and Golan Levin, convened during the exhibition for talks, workshops, and to produce new works. As part of the opening, graffiti artist KATSU tagged Eyebeam's façade with a fire extinguisher, accidentally splashing some of the pigment on Paula Cooper Gallery which was “a perfect example of F.A.T.’s IRL trolling practices.” During F.A.T. Gold: Five Years of Free Art & Technology, Howard and the artists took journalist Adrian Chen for a ride in a fake Google driverless car. The exhibition led cyberpunk author Bruce Sterling to ask, "Why aren’t these violently compassionate art-hackers all in jail?" F.A.T. Gold: Five Years of Free Art & Technology subsequently toured to MU Eindhoven in the Netherlands and Gray Area Foundation for the Arts, where Howard curated a portrait of former Google Chairman Eric Schmidt made out of poop. F.A.T. Lab went to San Francisco to "celebrate the victory of government and commercial hegemony over the internet and the total loss of personal freedom and privacy"; the group disbanded in 2015.

=== Additional curation ===
- New Theories in VR, New Lab
- The Barn Show: Unquestionable Optimism, Johannes Vogt Gallery, 2016
- Pattern Recognition, Dazed & Confused Magazine
- Eyebeam Resurfaces: The Future of the Digital Archive, Eyebeam
- C.R.E.A.M., Art Micro Patronage
- WALLPAPERS: Sara Ludy and Nicolas Sassoon, 319 Scholes
- Awareness of Everything, Internet Garage
- Art Hack Day: God Mode, 319 Scholes
- Blip Festival Gallery, Eyebeam
- Getting Closer, Fe Arts Gallery
- Alexandra Gorczynski and Duncan Malashock, 319 Scholes

== Bibliography ==
- Room for Space: an interview with Nicholas O'Brien, Keen On Magazine (July 2018)
- Petra Cortright on having the confidence to create anything you want, The Creative Independent (May 2018)
- Inventing the Future: Art and Technology, Art21 (October 2017)
- The Presentation of Self: Interview with LaTurbo Avedon, Keen On Magazine (October 2017)
- A Prankster-Turned-Painter Leaves Self-Sabotage Behind, Hyperallergic (November 2016)
- Alternative Paradise: Marc Horowitz, Keen On Magazine (November 2016)
- Leaders of the New Media Pack, CULTURED Magazine (February 2016)
- Artist Profile: Heather Phillipson, Rhizome (July 2014)
- Artist Profile: Michael Manning, Rhizome (April 2014)
- The Way We Share: Transparency in Curatorial Practice, Hyperallergic (March 2013)
- Awareness of Everything, Aram Bartholl: Speed Book published by Gestalten (January 2012)

== See also ==
- Internet art
- Post Internet
- Free Art and Technology Lab
