= Stefan Hechenberger =

Austrian artist and programmer

- Born: Innsbruck, Austria
- Known for: interactive art, programming, open source, industrial design
- Notable work: CUBIT (multi-touch), Lasersaur
- Movement: Open source

Stefan Hechenberger is an Austrian artist and programmer. His works include interactive software, computer vision projects and open-source hardware.

Hechenberger has worked with Zach Lieberman in creating the OpenCV library for openFrameworks, an open source C++ library for creative coding and graphics.

In 2006, Hechenberger co-founded the New York City and Vienna based research and development collaborative, NORTD labs, which developed the open source system called CUBIT (multi-touch) in 2007 and the more recent iteration TouchKit in 2008.

From 2007 to 2008, Hechenberger was an honorary fellow at Eyebeam. In 2011, under NORTD labs he was a fellow at Culture Lab UK. During 2012, NORTD labs held residencies at Hyperwerk Institute for Postindustrial Design in Basel, Switzerland and Carnegie Mellon University STUDIO for Creative Inquiry for their most recent project Lasersaur.

Hechenberger holds a Vordiplom in Computer Science and Astronautics from the Technical University of Munich and an MFA from CADRE Laboratory for New Media, San Jose State University. He also holds a Master of Professional Studies from New York University.

== Selected works ==
- Lasersaur
- CUBIT
- Touchkit
- JTR
- Asymmetric Love #2

== Awards and Fellowships ==
- Artist-In-Residence MuseumqsQuartier Vienna 2013–2014
- Mozilla Open(art) Fellow 2013
- Carnegie Mellon University STUDIO for Creative Inquiry Resident 2012
- Hyperwerk Institute for Postindustrial Design Resident 2011–2012
- CultureLab Fellow 2011
- Eyebeam Art and Technology Center, Advisory Council 2008

== Exhibitions and Lectures ==
- Museumsquartier, Vienna, 2013
- Makerfaire Rome, 2013
- Mediamatic, Amsterdam, 2014
- Stalkfest Mediamatic, Amsterdam, 2014
