= Ingrid Burrington =

Writer and artist

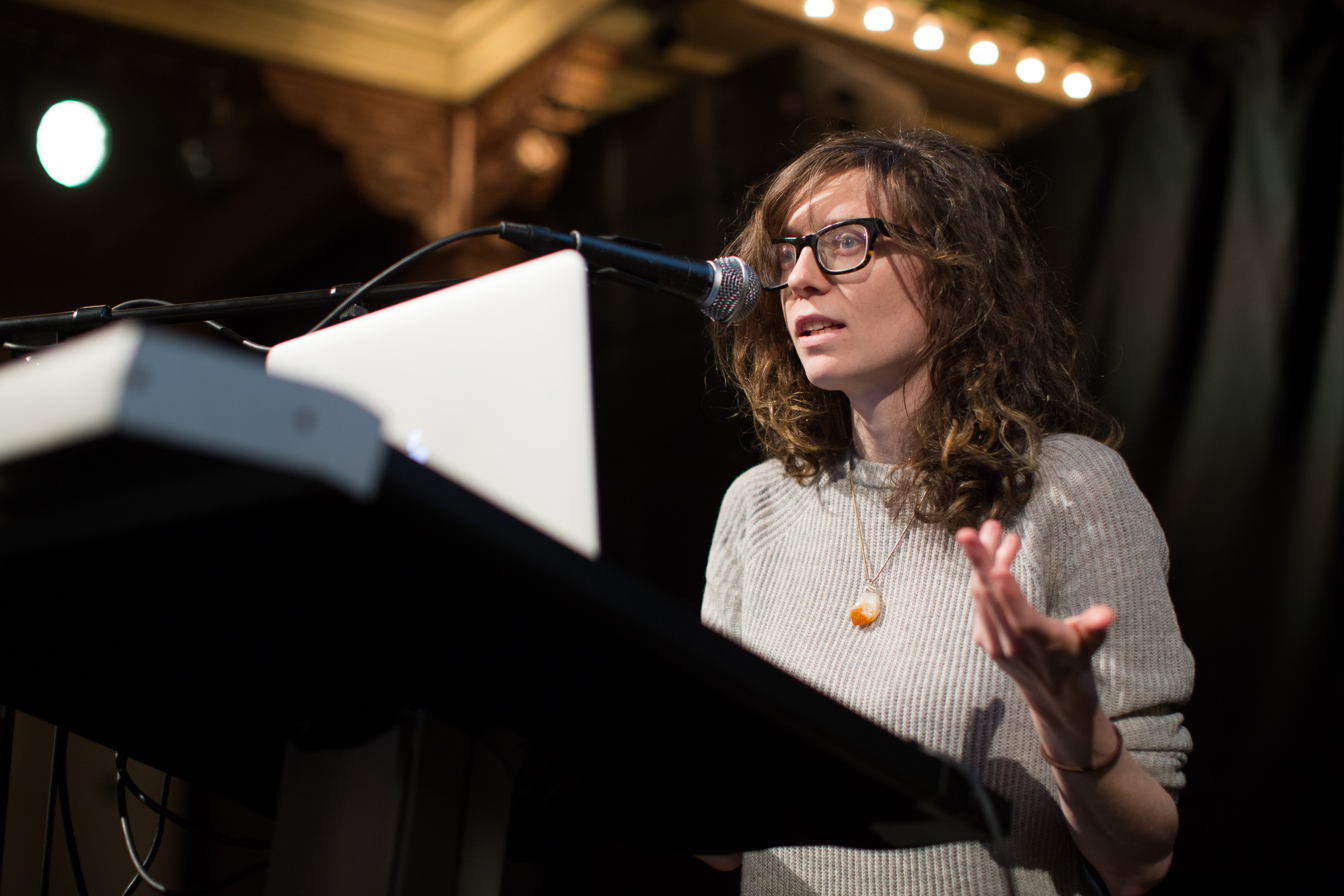
- Born: 1987 (age 38–39)
- Education: Maryland Institute College of Art, University of Delaware
- Notable work: Networks of New York: An Illustrated Field Guide to Urban Internet Infrastructure
- Website: lifewinning.com

Ingrid Burrington (born 1987) is a writer and artist based out of Brooklyn, New York, whose work focuses on data, internet infrastructure, the sciences, and the tech industry.

Her book Networks of New York: An Illustrated Field Guide to Urban Internet Infrastructure with Melville House Publishing was released in 2016, and her writing has also appeared in numerous publications including The Atlantic, The Nation, Vice, and San Francisco Arts Quarterly.

== Career ==
Burrington's career, which began with a focus on art and data visualization, shifted toward the field of network infrastructure in 2013 after the leaking of the Snowden files. It was then that she became interested in what the inside of the internet looked like, beyond what the media was trying to depict. This eventually lead Burrington to write her book, Networks of New York, where she uses over fifty illustrations to help readers understand and outline the urban Internet infrastructure.

Over the course of Burrington's career, she has received noteworthy grants and held positions with organizations such as:

- Center for Advanced Global Research in Communications at Annenberg School for Communication at the University of Pennsylvania (2022) - Research Affiliate
- Pioneer Works (2021) - Technology Resident
- Interactive Telecommunications Program at New York University Tisch School of the Arts (2020) - Research Fellow
- Eyebeam Art and Technology Center (October 2017 - October 2018) - Journalism Resident
- Experimental Research Lab at Autodesk/Pier 9 (February 2016 - June 2016) - Fellow
- Center for Land Use Interpretation (September 2015) - Resident
- Knight Foundation Prototype Fund with Surya Mattu (2015) - Grantee
- Frank-Ratchye STUDIO for Creative Inquiry, Carnegie Mellon University (Winter 2014) - Resident
- Data and Society Research Institute (2014–2015) - Fellow
- Eyebeam Art and Technology Center (Spring 2014) - Resident
- The Wassaic Project (Fall 2013) - Resident
- Lower Manhattan Cultural Council Swingspace Program (Fall 2011) - Resident

Burrington has also held adjunct teaching positions at Cooper Union (2018-2019, 2024-2025), The New School (2021), Rhode Island School of Design (2017), and School for Poetic Computation (2015–2016). As of spring 2020 she is involved in the Humans in Residence (HIRs) program within the NYU Tisch School of The Arts.

She has also participated in numerous residencies, held teaching positions, and presented talks and workshops to the public. Burrington is currently represented as an artist by NOME, an art gallery focused on raising awareness about current issues and based in Berlin. She is also a founding member of Deep Lab.

== Education ==
Burrington graduated from the Maryland Institute College of Art in 2009 with a BFA in Printmaking and completed her doctorate at the Department of Geography and Spatial Sciences at the University of Delaware in January 2026.

== Selected events and exhibitions ==
Some of the most recent events and exhibitions that have displayed her work include:

- The Only Lasting Truth Is Change - BEK, Bergen, Norway (November 10-13, 2022)
- Agency - NOME Gallery, Berlin, DE. (October 27 - December 7, 2018)
- Hidden Structures - Oddstream Festival, Netherlands (October 11-14, 2018)
- Future Perfect - Data and Society Research Institute (June 7–8, 2018)
- Futureproof - Haverford College, PA (October 27 - December 17, 2017)
- Haunted Machines, Wicked Problems - Impakt Festival, NL (October 25 - November 12, 2017)
- The Glass Room - London, United Kingdom (October 25 - November 12, 2017)
- Infosphere - CENART, Mexico City, Mexico (May 25 - September 3, 2017)
- To Serve The National Interest - Ace Hotel Gallery, New York, NY. (April 5–28, 2017)
- Evidentiary Realism - Fridman Gallery, New York City, NY. (February 28 - March 31, 2017)
- Reconnaissance - NOME Gallery, Berlin, DE. (September 17 - November 11, 2016)
- THE NEXT BIG THING IS NOT A THING: Surveying the Design Discipline - Bureau Europa, Maastricht, NL (March 5 - June 10, 2016)
- Big Bang Data - Somerset House, London, United Kingdom. (December 3, 2015 - March 20, 2016)
- New Inc x Deep Lab - Ideas City Festival, New Museum (May 27-31, 2015)
