= Nkonde (surname) =

Nkonde is a surname. Notable people with the name include:

- Mutale Nkonde, Zambian journalist and artificial intelligence policy researcher
- Serge Tshembo Nkonde, Congolese politician
- Sunday Nkonde, Zambian solicitor general
