= Deep Lab =

- Formation: December 2014
- Founder: Addie Wagenknecht
- Founded at: Frank-Ratchye Studio
- Type: Cyberfeminism - Research
- Fields: Privacy - Code - Surveillance - Art - Hacktivism - Race - Capitalism - Anonymity
- Members: Addie Wagenknecht, Allison Burtch, Claire L. Evans, Denise Caruso, Harlo Holmes, Ingrid Burrington, Kate Crawford, Jen Lowe, Julia Kaganskiy, Joana Varon, Jillian York, Lindsay Howard, Lorrie Cranor, Madeleine Varner, Maral Pourkazemi, Runa Sandvik, Simone Browne, Maryam al-Khawaja, Sarah M. Aoun

Deep Lab is a women's collective group composed of artists, researchers, writers, engineers, and cultural producers. These women are involved in critical assessments of contemporary digital culture and, together, work to exploit the potential for creative inquiry lying dormant in the deep web. Outside of Deep Lab, the members engage in activities that range from magazine editing, journalism, various forms of activism, and teaching. The collective's research spans a variety of topics including privacy, code, surveillance, art, social hacking, capitalism, race, anonymity, 21st century infrastructures, and practical skills for real-world applications. Deep Lab draws influence from Experiments in Art and Technology (E.A.T.), Cypherpunks, Guerrilla Girls, Free Art and Technology Lab (F.A.T.), Chaos Computer Club, and Radical Software.

== Background ==
The Deep Lab collective was created "Because we wanted to be together. Because the original computers were women. Because it can't not. Because we are stronger as a pack. Because I’m trying to stay connected to the self. Because sharing is caring. Because we want to dig deeper. Because girls just wanna have fun. Because you shouldn't have to ask for permission." In 2014, the collective gathered at the Frank-Ratchye Studio for Creative Inquiry at Carnegie Mellon University and published a compilation of reflections on digital culture, the post-Snowden Internet, and cyber-feminism called Deep Lab. The beginning of Deep Lab were organized by Abbie Wagenknecht who was a fellow at Studio through a grant from The Andy Warhol Foundation for the Visual Arts with the idea of examining how themes of privacy, security, surveillance, anonymity, and large-scale data aggregation are problematized in the arts, culture, and society.

The key issues that Deep Lab is seeking to address is the discrimination towards marginalized people at the hands of “corporate dominance, data mining, government surveillance, and a male-dominated tech field.” The collective has noted that internet privacy has different meanings to men and women, citing the exposure of female celebrities’ nude images, and claims that big business doesn’t have an interest in making privacy easy for women as it doesn’t help their profit margins. Founder Addie Wagenknecht explains that the lack of privacy expansion will not change until women and the marginalized divorce themselves from corporations in favor of alternatives. In reference to the lack of women in technology, Deep Lab cites large disproportions in female enrollment in computer science programs and STEM degrees, culture marketing and associating computers and technology with men, and a failure of computer science to beckon to its history despite the pioneers of computer science being women. The collective also encourages women to become educated in technology and code in order to protect themselves from both personal attacks and government surveillance in addition to encrypting email, hard drives, using secure chat spaces with the ultimate goal of ending the taboo of women in technology.

== Residencies ==
Members of Deep Lab collaborating during their residency at Studio

=== Studio ===
The published 2014 work Deep Lab was written in five days by the original gathering of the cyber-feminist collective and was a capstone to the women’s residency in Studio. In the 240-page book, Deep Lab details all of the research conducted, beginning with notes from a talk by Jen Lowe on the role Big Data plays currently and how it will play out in the future. The essay covers how Big Data is able to learn about people based on simple interactions on social media or through credit cards, how Data may be used to silence people’s voices and police them, and mentions how the Deep Web, although a dark and dangerous frontier, might offer women and marginalized people the opportunity for sanctuary. Claire Evans writes on the history of cyberfeminism with previous groups such as VNS Matrix, how the internet is still a male-dominated venue, and how the internet is lending itself to strength the female voice.

Other essays in the manifesto include one by Denise Caruso on privacy, how corporations are leeching data off of consumers in attempted to make as much money off the human being as possible, and how Deep Lab is teaching those who will listen how to fight these parasites. Deep Lab includes essays that reach out to its readers to inform people on finding secure data centers through the Deep Web and what app can be used to do so, informing the reader on the size and expanse of the “Torture Report” and the Pentagon’s 1033 program which disperses surplus military equipment to law enforcement agencies, shows Harlo Holmes’ “Unveillance” software designed to unpack and deconstruct text documents, and gives a “how-to” guide on using Foxxy Doxxing (an anti-cyberbullying information collection program). Deep Lab ends with an essay that raises the question “what is privacy” and reveals compiled research by the collective on what people of various age groups believe privacy is.

Other works to come from the Studio residency includes the Deep Lab Lecture Series and a documentary film by filmmaker Jonathan Minard. The Deep Lab Lecture Series initially took place at Studio on the evenings of December 8–11 and were free to the public. Speakers in the series included Maddy Varner, Lorrie Faith Cranor, Maral Pourkazemi, Jen Lowe, Harlo Holmes, Ingrid Burrington, Allison Burtch, Addie Wagenknecht, and Denise Caruso.

=== New Museum ===
In May 2015, Deep Lab was invited to NEW INC at New Museum for a week-long residency for the women of the collective to continue their initial work with privacy, security, surveillance, anonymity, and data aggregation as well as how those themes tie into The Invisible City. The Invisible City centered around the future of the city under the lens of arts and culture and raised questions about transparency and surveillance, citizenship and representation, expression and suppression, participation and dissent, and the invisible forces at work in cities. As a part of the residency, Deep Lab collaborated with the community present at NEW INC as well as other community groups such as Data & Society. The residency occurred at the same time as New Museum’s IDEAS CITY festival with the aim of Deep Lab introducing “critical issues in technology and society to a wider audience through discourse and public engagement.” Outside of the residency, Deep Lab engaged with the public through performance art of drone painting with director Addie Wagenknecht, NEW INC’s Dan Moore, and Becky Stern. In addition, panels and discussions were held surrounding topics such as “Surveillant Anxiety,” “Data and Social Justice,” “Pipelines to Tech Empowerment,” and “How to PGP in 10 minutes or less.” At the end of the residency, Deep Lab produced and open-source toolkit about what was discovered in IDEAS CITY so it would reach a larger audience.

== Collaborators ==
Members of the collective include Addie Wagenknecht (Deep Lab director and artist), Allison Burtch (researcher and artist), Claire Evans (Futures Editor of Motherboard, Vice magazine), Denise Caruso (Senior Research Scholar at Carnegie Mellon University), Harlo Holmes (Freedom of the Press and The Guardian Project), Ingrid Burrington (artist and researcher), Kate Crawford (Visiting Professor MIT), Jen Lowe (data scientist), Julia Kaganskiy (NEW INC Director), Joana Varon (researcher), Jillian York (Director for International Freedom of Expression at the Electronic Frontier Foundation), Lindsay Howard (curator), Lorrie Cranor (Director of CyLab Usable Privacy and Security Laboratory), Madeleine Varner (artist and developer), Maral Pourkazemi (data and information designer), Runa Sandvik (Tor Project researcher), Simone Browne (African and African Diaspora Studies Professor University of Texas - Austin), Maryam al-Khawaja (activist), and Sarah M. Aoun (developer and activist) as well as other women who collaborate with Deep Lab.

Other collaborators include:

- Erika M. Anderson
- Biella Coleman
- Jade E. Davis
- Sydette Harry
- Calena Jamieson
- Karen Levy
- Yvonne NG
- Mutale Nkonde
- Jackie Zammuto
