= SFPC =

SFPC can mean:

- School for Poetic Computation
- Shelby Farms Park Conservancy, see Shelby Farms
- Shannon Foynes Port Company, see Shannon Foynes Port
