= Addie Wagenknecht =

American artist (born 1981)

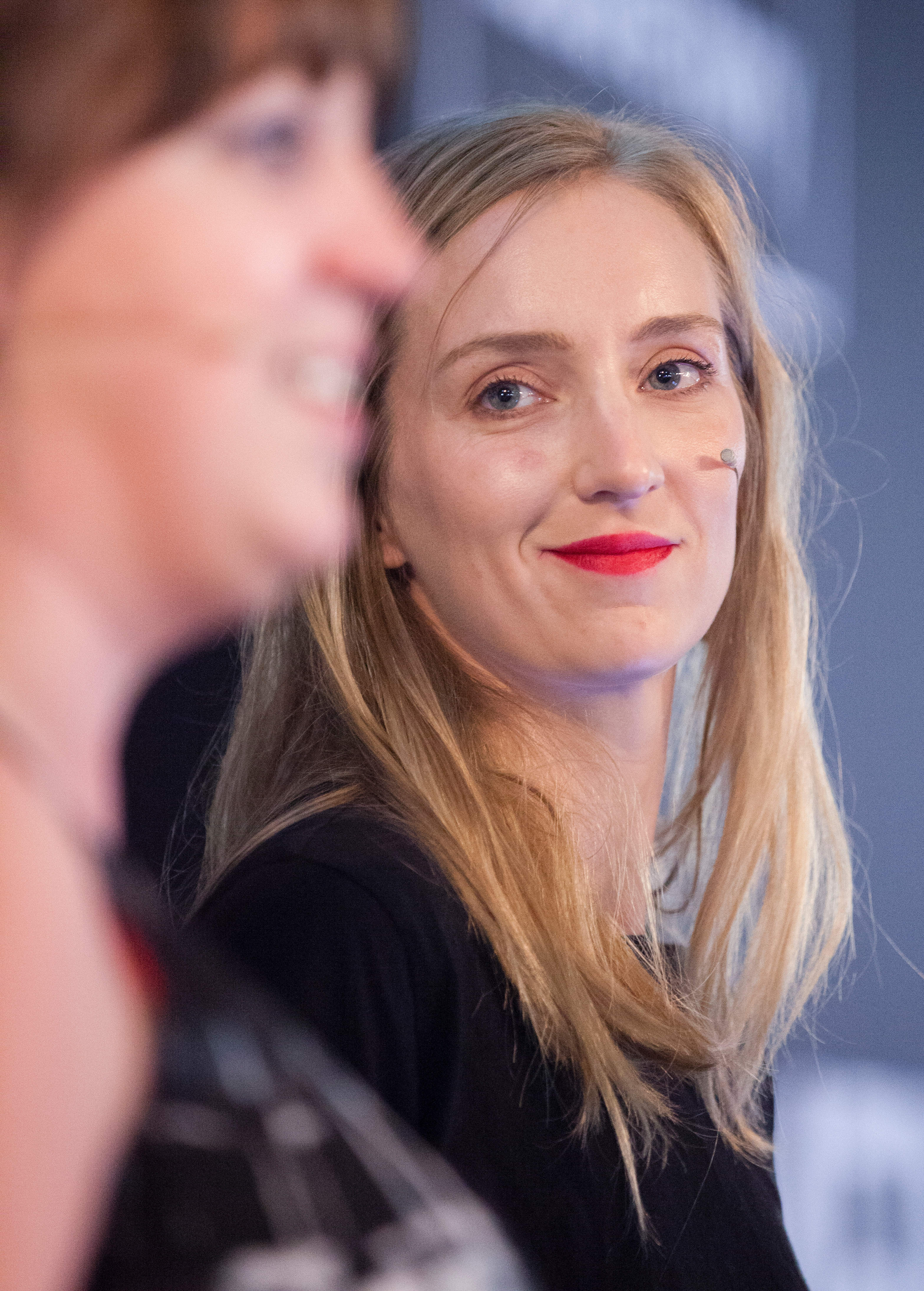
- Born: April 15, 1981 (age 45); Portland, Oregon, U.S.
- Education: MPS in interactive telecommunications, New York University
- Known for: Interactive art, open source, digital art
- Notable work: Lasersaur, Wifitagger, Webcam Venus
- Movement: Digital Utopianism
- Website: www.placesiveneverbeen.com

Addie Wagenknecht is an American artist and researcher living in New York City and Liechtenstein. Her work deals primarily with pop culture, feminist theory, new media and open source software and hardware. She frequently works in collectives, which have included Nortd Labs, F.A.T. lab, and Deep Lab. She has received fellowships and residencies from Eyebeam, Mozilla, the Studio for Creative Inquiry at Carnegie Mellon University and CERN.

== Biography ==
Addie Wagenknecht was born in Portland, Oregon, in 1981. She received a Bachelor of Science in multimedia and computer science from University of Oregon in 2001, and an MPS from New York University's Interactive Telecommunications Program in 2007. During her time at NYU, she founded NORTD labs with Stefan Hechenberger, a research and development lab which developed open source multi-touch systems CUBIT and TouchKit, as well Lasersaur an open-source laser cutter.

Her and her projects have been supported by numerous residencies and fellowships. She held Eyebeam fellowships in 2007 – 2008 and in 2013 as Eyebeam and Mozilla's first open(art) fellow and NORTD labs was a fellow at Culture Lab in 2011. During 2012 NORTD labs held residencies at Hyperwerk Institute for Postindustrial Design in Basel, Switzerland and Carnegie Mellon University's STUDIO for Creative Inquiry.

Wagenknecht was a member of the now-disbanded Free Art and Technology Lab aka F.A.T. lab. Wagenknecht founded Deep Lab in 2013, which focuses on alternative market economies and creative research, using anonymity as a proxy.

== Selected works ==
=== CUBIT (2007) ===
The first open-source multi-touch system using diffused illumination with software written in OpenFrameworks was developed under NORTD labs as their first open source project. CUBIT was designed with the intention to redefine visual computing and depart from the mouse pointer paradigm. CUBIT was originally developed as a thesis project at New York University's Interactive Telecommunications Program in 2006 and its continued research and development into 2008 as TouchKit was supported by a fellowship at Eyebeam Atelier.

=== Black Hawk Paint (2008–) ===
Wagenknecht is cited as developing the process of drone painting in 2007 as a mechanical method of painting in order to surrender the human gesture to the machine. Pieces in the series include Foundational Mathematics as Concept Art, (2015); Everything and Nothing was Beautiful (2014); and the series umbrella series Black Hawk Paint (2008–). In 2015 as part of a residency at the New Museum in New York City, she performed drone painting live for the first time publicly in over 500 people.

=== Lasersaur (2009–2019) ===
The Lasersaur is an open source laser cutter designed by NORTD labs to fill the need of makers, artists, and scientists who wanted a safe, cheap, and highly capable machine. It started its alpha stage in March 2011 and beta stage in June 2011 after successful funding on Kickstarter. Current worldwide Lasersaur builds can be viewed on their google map page. Lasersaur systems have also been built by many universities such as New York University, University of Newcastle, and Carnegie Mellon University.

=== WifiTagger (2012) ===
The WifiTagger runs on OpenWrt firmware and a TP-Link WR741ND router which likens Wi-Fi SSIDs to digital graffiti. It allows you to create four open 32-digit SSIDs which when selected directs the user to the interface to add new tags. It was developed for Free Art and Technology Lab in 2012.

=== Webcam Venus (2013) ===
In Webcam Venus is a project created by asking online Sexcam performers to replicate iconic works of art. This piece was an experimental homage to both fine art and the lowbrow internet phenomenon of cams. The piece was developed for Free Art and Technology Lab in 2013 in collaboration with Pablo Garcia.

=== Asymmetric Love (2013) ===
Asymmetric Love re-uses CCTV equipment and arranges 14 cameras into a 'baroque' chandelier. It is placed as such in an entrance portal of museums or major collection houses. Asymmetric Love is a chandelier composed of CCTV cameras rather than candles or light bulbs. Number 2 from the series was the highest-selling lot at Phillips Auction House in New York City, curated by Lindsay Howard, for their first digital art auction in October 2013.

In 2026, New York-based rock band Interpol used Asymmetric Love as the cover artwork of the album This Mirror Weighs a Ton.

=== Deep Lab (2013–2020) ===
Deep Lab was founded by Wagenknecht in 2014 with the support of The Studio for Creative Inquiry at Carnegie Mellon University to examine contemporary culture through an understanding of alternative market economies and creative research, using anonymity as a proxy. The group's works are accessible via a hidden services site on the deep web. The collaborative is made up primarily of women working within privacy, surveillance, code, big data research, art and critical culture. Founding members include Jillian York, Claire L. Evans, and Lorrie Cranor. In 2015 Deep Lab was in residence at NEW INC in 2015. In 2018 the collaborative was commissioned and in residence for the York Biennial where they developed the site-specific 10.5-hour large-scale video work "Can You Die If You Don’t Exist?", which was conceived by Deep Lab as part of the residency. In the performance, they read every name and non-name of the women, children, and men who died attempting to claim asylum in Europe since the early 1990s, which at the time of the installation was 34,361 refugees.\

=== Data and Dragons 1-3 (2014) ===
Data and Dragons 1-3 is a project that consists of three installation pieces, those being Data and Dragons: XXXX.XXX (2014), Data and Dragons: Cloud Farming (2014), Data and Dragons: Kilohydra (2014). XXXX.XXX is an installation piece that is part of the Data & Dragons Level 1-3 project launched in 2014. Exhibit tied in many various locations amongst them the exhibition "alien matter". It consists of five custom printed circuit boards, connected by Ethernet patch cables, each board is made of 80/20 aluminum and sized at, 35.5 in × 23.5 in × 1.75 in (902 mm × 597 mm × 44 mm) , each. Cloud Farming is an installation piece that is part of the Data & Dragons Level 1-3 project launched in 2014, this sculpture is made of the same material and looks like two dragons circling each other in the sky, they size at 31 in × 87 in × 35 in (790 mm × 2,210 mm × 890 mm). Lastly Kilohydra is also an installation piece that is part of the Data & Dragons Level 1-3 project launched in 2014, which is made up of the same circuits as xxxx.xxx, these boards intercept and log data from their surrounding, sized at 5 in × 23.75 in × 20 in (127 mm × 603 mm × 508 mm).

=== Alone Together (2017–) ===
Alone Together renegotiates the 1960 Anthropometries performance series of Yves Klein while utilizing the actual French sourced International Klein Blue pigment with reconfigured robotic Roombas. In the original Anthropometries, Klein directs nude female models who he referred to as “living paintbrushes,” to press their pigment-covered bodies onto large canvases in front of an audience. In Wagenknecht's series, the body is always absent, utilizing Yves Klein's namesake blue and painted using a robotic device as a brush. The robot navigates around the artist's nude body as she reclines on a canvas. The result is a void in the shape of a woman, painted by a robot learning the algorithm it intuited of her body. There is no public documentation of her performance or process on display, the artist female form is only acknowledged in the negative space of the paintings.

=== Beauty (2018–) ===
Beauty revolves around the examination of visibility through culturally defined "feminine" gestures. The paintings use reconfigured Roomba, a robotic vacuum cleaner, to disperse a mixture of cosmetic pigments, pharmaceuticals, perfumes, and skincare products across canvas using algorithms. The resulting works are intended to push roles of the materials, presenting an abstract aesthetic. The artist aims to reclaim visibility by utilizing devices typically employed for sanitation and surveillance, offering a reinterpretation of beauty and a contemporary portrait of the modern woman.

Wagenknecht use of substances that are typically used to alter appearances, including technology, cosmetics, and certain medications. The artwork "Perfect Storm" (2021) accumulates materials such as cosmetic dyes, sedatives, antidepressants, vodka, and perfume. A Roomba which the artist partially interjects the motion of the robotic devices that distributes Xanax and lipstick in an 'ironic attempt at cleanliness'. By stripping these materials into a medium for application onto canvas, Wagenknecht aims to achieve them as raw color and texture, challenging their perception of use.

In this series, the representation of female figure is again absent, emphasizing Wagenknecht's exploration of visibility. During the artist's solo exhibition titled "Alone Together" held in New York City, the female form was illustrated through negative space. Through the subsequent Beauty works, Wagenknecht continues this non-illustrative dialogue by reclaiming tools used for conformity or control, offering a 'study of contemporary portraiture'. The path of the Roomba, occasionally indicated by a circular form or geometric angle generates a homogenized painter's palette that exudes a frenzied and eerily human effect, reducing the Abstract Expressionist movement's celebrated action painting to an algorithm executed by an electronic device.

== Awards and fellowships ==
- MEET Milan AI Fellow and Keynote, 2023
- CERN, 2022
- Carnegie Mellon University STUDIO for Creative Inquiry Resident 2019
- Artistic Bokeh Research Fellow at the University of Applied Arts Vienna 2013/2014
- Artist-In-Residence MuseumsQuartier Vienna 2013/2014
- Mozilla Open(art) Fellow 2013
- Carnegie Mellon University STUDIO for Creative Inquiry Resident 2012
- Hyperwerk Institute for Postindustrial Design Resident 2011/2012
- CultureLabUK Fellow 2011
- World Technology Summit 2009 IT Hardware Finalist
- Eyebeam Art and Technology Center Fellow 2007/2008
- Wasserman Fellow, NYU 2007
