= KATSU =

Graffiti artist

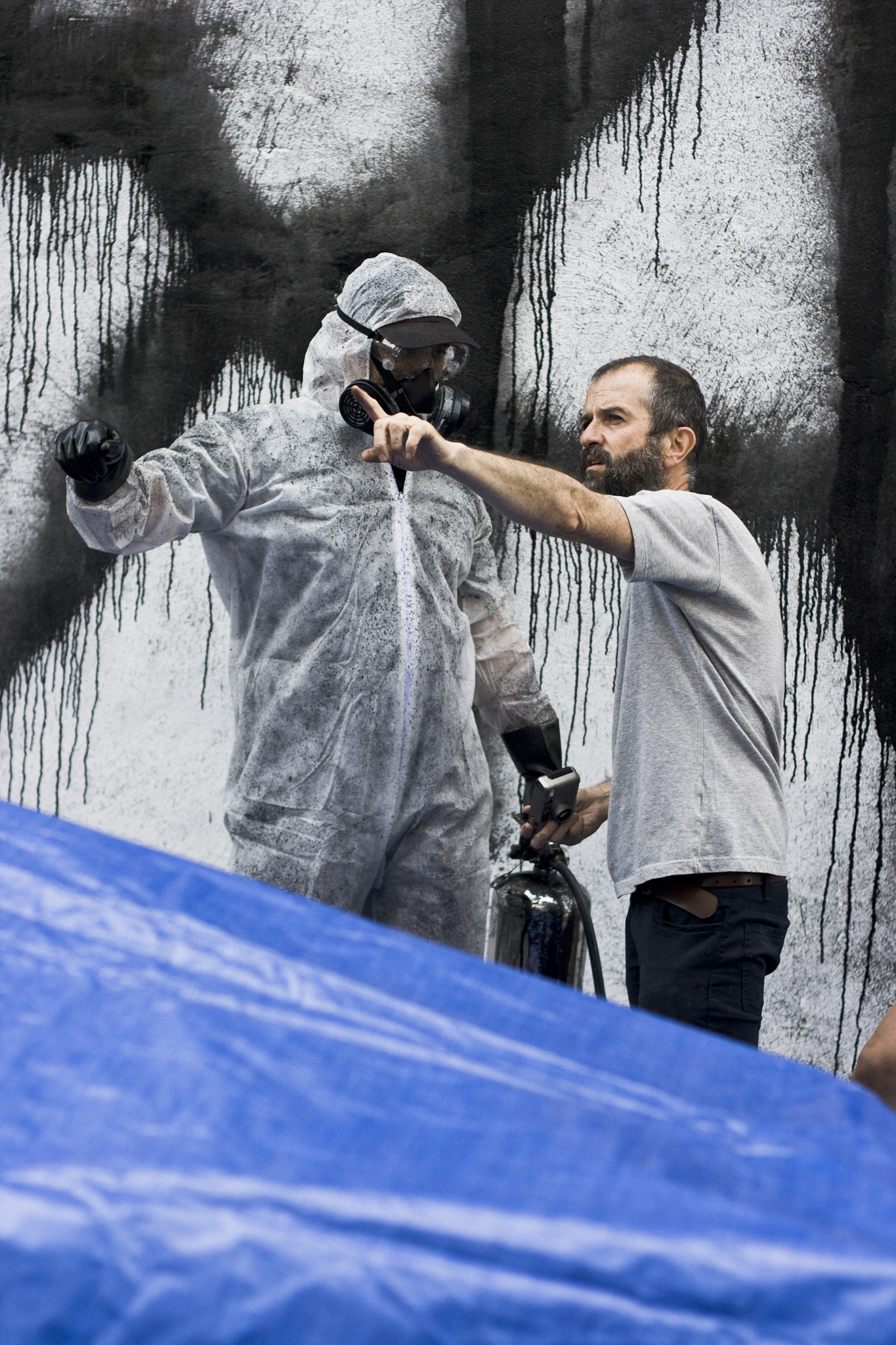
- Graffiti Artist KATSU (left) with photographer Ari Marcopoulos
- Known for: Conceptual art; Digital art; Digital graffiti
- Notable work: 6–23 '13 – N6 Street – Brooklyn
- Movement: Graffiti
- Years active: Late 1990s – present

Tag
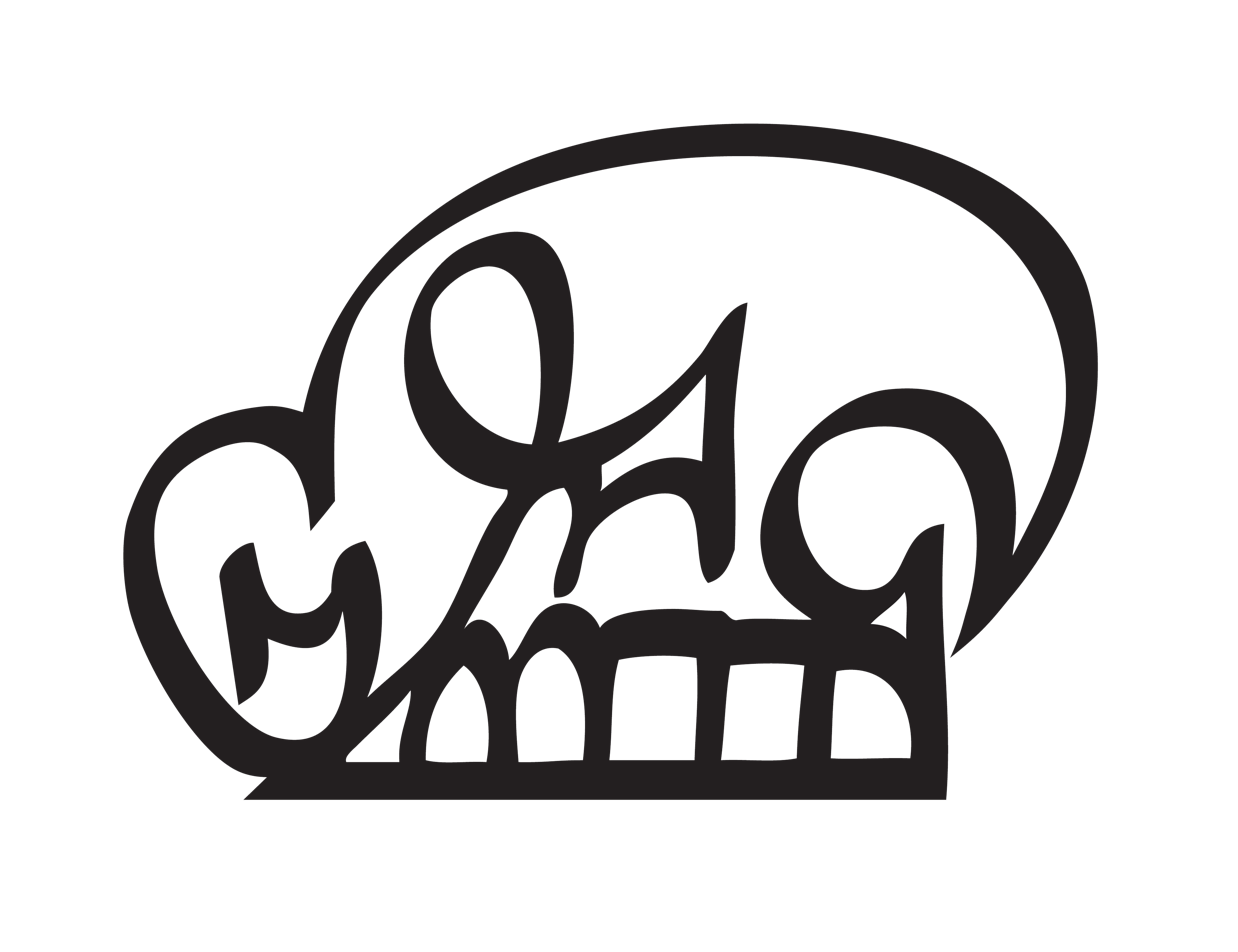

KATSU is a graffiti artist who is active in New York City. He works with technology and public intervention to comment on commercialism, privacy and digital culture. As a result, his work includes traditional graffiti, digital media, and conceptual artwork.

== Works ==
=== AI portraiture ===
Exhibited as part of a 2017 solo show titled AI Criminals, KATSU's portraiture series consists of a generative adversarial network built using Google's TensorFlow machine learning library and trained using vintage black and white mug shots scraped from the web, to output unique portraits. The pieces explore themes of inherent bias in algorithms, Wired magazine notes that "there's more to AI portraits in KATSU's view, than just a comment on the growing power of technology—it's a warning about humanity's lack of control over what these tools can build".

=== Drone painting ===
Graffiti Drone created by KATSU

After experimentation with quadcopter drones and in collaboration with FAT Lab member, Becky Stern, KATSU developed a prototype mountable remote sprayer- the resultant device was dubbed the Graffiti Drone. A press release from The Hole Gallery the described the process of its refinement as testing with "weight of the paint, the straw for the sprayer, the sensor for the can activation, the flight of the drone and different paint and surfaces".

Commenting on the significance of the work the artist explains that "drones are becoming this extension of human beings in the same way that we're growing so close to our smartphones and devices...It's really exciting to see and understand and think about what it means that many of the aesthetic decisions in these paintings are not my decisions. They're these collaborative decisions with this technology".

On April 30, 2015, it was reported that KATSU had used his Graffiti Drone to vandalize a Soho billboard approximately six stories tall. A video of the Calvin Klein advertisement featuring model Kendall Jenner being defaced went viral on YouTube. Citing the quadcopter as "Graffiti Drone 1.0" the act was described as proof of concept demonstrating the potential that drones have to transform graffiti.

=== Dronescapes ===
Dronescapes are a series of abstract paintings created using the graffiti drone described as "robot-controlled versions of Impressionist paintings".

=== Android selfies ===
Android Selfies are a triptych of monochrome oil paintings of a Series 800 Terminator Android taking selfies at Mount Rushmore, the Pyramids of Giza and the Moon.

=== Icarus One ===
Wired magazine reported KATSU's plans to make the design for his graffiti drone open source, "so other artists can experiment with its possibilities". The plans for the Graffiti Drone, subsequently named ICARUS ONE were released on an independent website licensed under a Creative Commons Attribution.

=== Shitheads ===
Shitheads is triptych of portraits of Mark Zuckerberg, Eric Schmidt, and a Springer Spaniel dog created using the artist's feces as pigment. Vice magazine placed the piece in a lineage of artists using human waste in their work, calling Shitheads "the Digital Era's Piss Christ".

=== Digital graffiti ===
Through his digital projects "KATSU easily dupes audiences while questioning the nuances that separate reality and fiction—he also looks at the notion that graffiti doesn't have to be a physical product, instead it can exist purely digitally".

In 2010 two doctored videos of the artist surfaced on YouTube- the first showing KATSU tagging in front of the White House and the second, of him tagging Picasso's "Girl Before a Mirror" at the MoMA. Both brought widespread speculation about their authenticity and validity. In a later interview KATSU spoke of the videos saying the digital pieces "themselves are tags just in the form of video, and found on the internet" and were intended to "get graffiti writers to rethink the method[s] one could use in getting notoriety".

Blending graffiti and digital technology, his film The Powers of KATSU, the title referencing Charles and Ray Eames classic film Powers of Ten, in which he reproduces his skull tag from the scale of 1/20 of an inch, a grain of rice, to 120 feet, a New York rooftop – and an image visible from Google Earth. The video was later shortlisted for the Guggenheim Museum's YouTube Play Show.

=== Fat Tag iPhone application ===
KATSU has previously collaborated with Graffiti Research Lab, a collective of technologists, artists and hackers. He is currently a research fellow at the Free Art and Technology Lab where, along with artist and programmer Theo Watson, he developed the iPhone app Fat Tag Graffiti Deluxe-KATSU Edition.

=== Phone Booth and Fly Posting campaigns ===
KATSU Phonebooth Takeover

In April 2011 KATSU took over approximately 100 phone booths around New York City, replacing the advertisements with his own posters featuring celebrities and the logos of prominent corporations and institutions such as the MoMA and Apple.

As part of a Free Art and Technology Lab exhibition at Eyebeam, in 2013 the artist executed a fly posting campaign in New York City featuring an image of Mark Zuckerberg, photoshopped with a black eye, around New York City. Later commenting on it, KATSU responded "We're at the fork in the road with the web. It is being understood as a fundamental part of our evolution as a species. There are some that are fighting to protect privacy, anonymity and freedom and those who are trying to control, monitor and make profits. I want to let people know my beliefs."

=== MOCA Tag controversy and fire extinguisher graffiti ===
Mixed Media Installation, KATSU x Ari Marcopoulos

In April 2011, days before the opening of the show "Art in the Street" curated by Jeffrey Deitch, KATSU executed an extinguisher tag on the facade of The Geffen Contemporary at MOCA. The show was already under media scrutiny for being a "thoroughly sanitized history of graffiti and street art" as a result the event received wide media attention with the original YouTube video of the piece going viral. KATSU has since said that the tag was an "attempt to test Jeffrey Deitch's motives". The piece was placed on a wall initially intended for Os Gêmeos but was later painted over, despite reported efforts by artists Neckface, Barry McGee and Shepard Fairey to leave it be for the duration of the event, to make room for a tribute to graffiti artist Blade. Katsu continued to experiment with the medium and in January 2013 several buildings around Detroit, MI were reported to have been vandalized with large scribbles that appeared to be made with paint and enamel filled fire extinguishers. These were attributed to him after three large "KATSU" tags carried out with similar customized fire extinguishers appeared in the area shortly after.

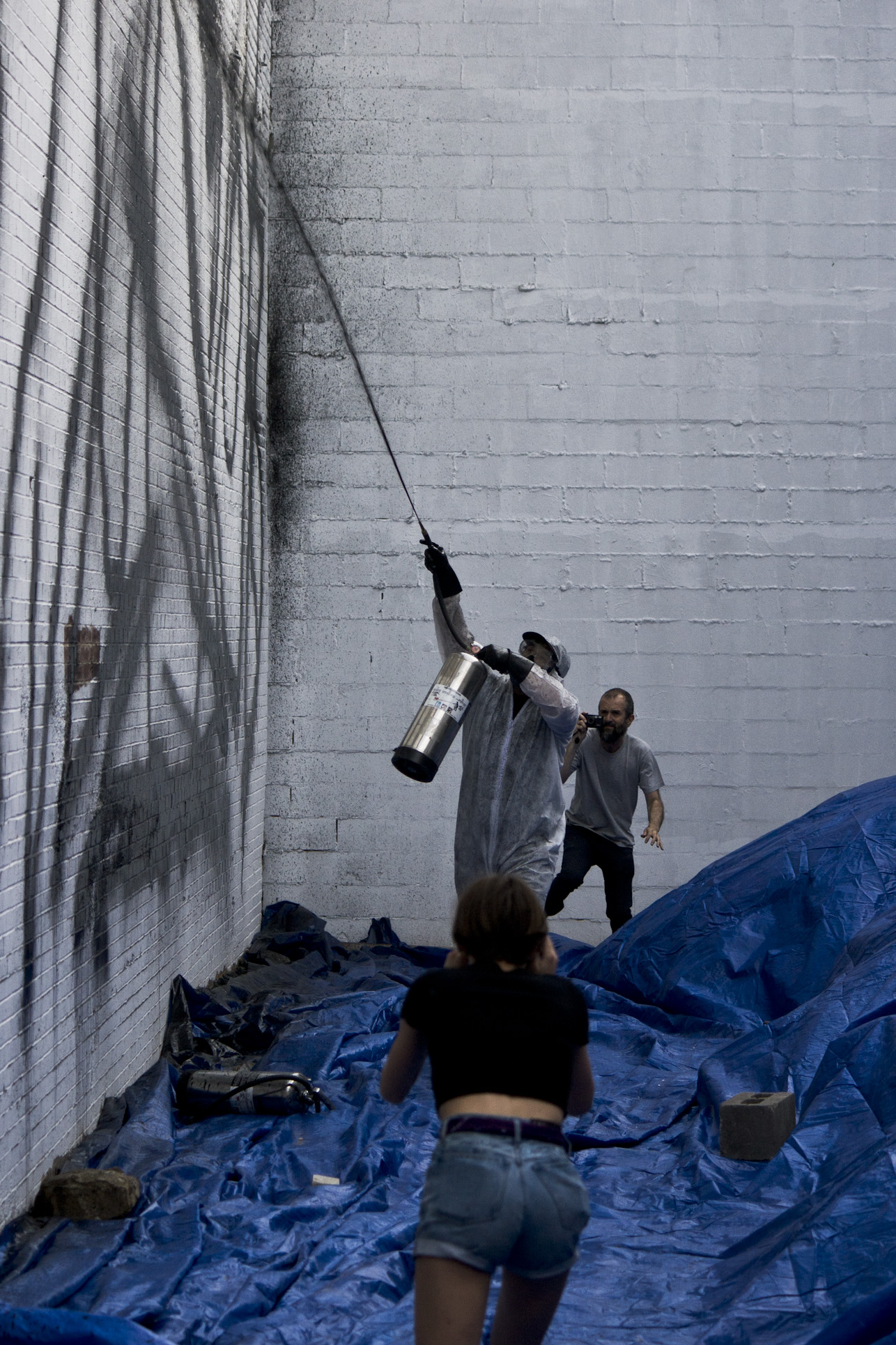
KATSU executing a fire extinguisher tag in Williamsburg, Brooklyn, 2013

KATSU also executed a fire extinguisher piece on the facade of Eyebeam Art and Technology Center as part of the F.A.T. GOLD retrospective.

Working in collaboration with photographer Ari Marcopoulos KATSU took over a vacant lot in Williamsburg, Brooklyn creating a mixed media extinguisher piece. Produced by Art publisher Dashwood, Marcopoulos and KATSU released a book documenting the piece, 6–23 '13 – N6 Street – Brooklyn, in 2014.

== Participatory art ==
KATSU encourages the public to become participants and not just observers, by using his works as canvas for their own graffiti efforts.
