= Jen Lowe =

American data scientist

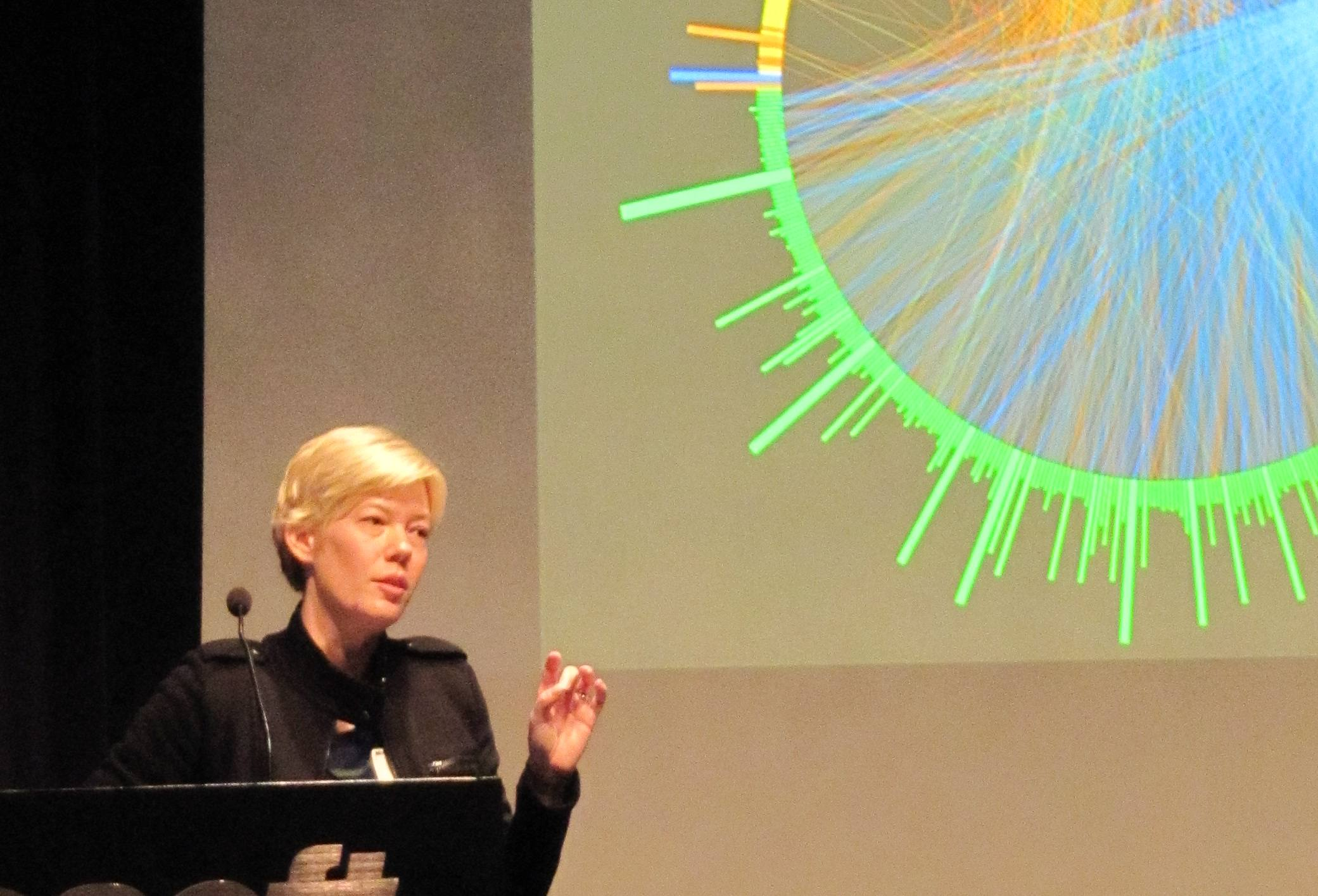
Jen Lowe presenting her winning entry at Wikiviz in 2011

Jen Lowe is an American data scientist and professor at New York University's Interactive Telecommunications Program (ITP). Lowe has also researched at Columbia University's Spatial Information Design Laboratory, as well as co-founding the School for Poetic Computation in New York. She is a member of the collective Deep Lab.

Lowe's work is primarily focused on human interactions with data technology, most notably her One Human Heartbeat project that visualizes Lowe's own heartbeat. Lowe currently lives in New York.

== Notable work ==
- One Human Heartbeat, a project in which Lowe visualized her heartbeat in semi- real time. The data was on a 24-hour delay to allow for data upload, but it played in real time. The piece was described as "hopeful."
- Wind Flow
- Guayupia, a collaboration with Patricio González Vivo. The two created a map of their son's genealogy and heritage, flipping the typical direction of maps so South was at the top.
- The Library Project, a collaboration between Laura Kurgan and the Spatial Information Design Lab, and visualization designers Annelie Berner and Derek Watkins.

== Published work ==
- The Book of Shaders
- Two-Component Horizontal Aerosol Motion Vectors in the Atmospheric Surface Layer from a Cross-Correlation Algorithm Applied to Scanning Elastic Backscatter Lidar Data
- Clearing Space
