= CUBIT =

Multi-touch computer user interface system

Cubit, often stylized CUBIT, is a computer user interface system for multi-touch devices, designed by Stefan Hechenberger and Addie Wagenknecht for Nortd Labs. It was developed to "demystify multitouch" technology by using an open-source model for software and hardware. It is a direct competitor of Microsoft Surface.

== Purchasing ==
As of 2 May 2008, Nortd Labs is accepting orders for developer kits named the TouchKit. Kit buyers and users must supply their own projector and camera at a cost estimated at between $1,080 and $1,580 USD.

As of July 2008, the CUBIT system is for sale, by commission only, and both are rumored to have a two to three-month waiting list.
