= Joseph DeLappe =

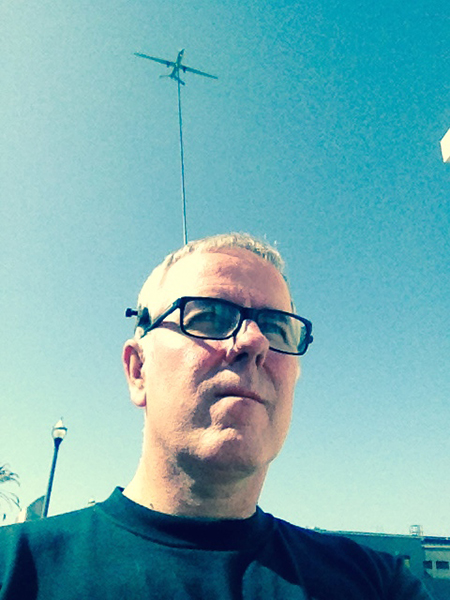
- DeLappe in 2014
- Born: 1963 (age 62–63); San Francisco
- Occupation: Artist
- Movement: Art intervention, Sculpture, Installation art, Video games as an art form

Joseph DeLappe (born 1963) is an American artist and academic best known for his art intervention pieces that explore contemporary issues in politics through new media installations and interactive gaming performances.

== Early life and education ==
A native of San Francisco, California, Joseph DeLappe graduated from Sacred Heart High School and went on to receive his Associate in Arts from City College of San Francisco followed by a Bachelor's in Graphic Design from San Jose State University as well as an MA Computers in Art & Design and a Master of Fine Arts in Pictorial Arts from the CADRE Laboratory for New Media. DeLappe directed the media program at the University of Nevada in Reno for twenty-three years and now works as a professor at Abertay University in Dundee, Scotland.

== Work ==
Joseph DeLappe has always worked in new media through which he expresses a distaste for power politics, stating that when he got engaged in political art it defined his purpose. DeLappe's 2006 intervention, Dead-in-Iraq, used an on-line game, America's Army, created by the US Defense department as a recruitment tool to memorialize the name and date of death for every US service member who died in Iraq, observing that America's Army was nothing but a sanitized metaphor to entice young people to enlist.

In 2008, DeLappe merged on-line gaming, performance art and sculpture in a reenactment of Mahatma Gandhi's 1930 Salt March at Eyebeam Art and Technology, NYC and in Second Life, a virtual world and then recreating Gandhi (Cardboard Gandhi, 2008–2009) out of corrugated cardboard in monumental scale.

The performance, "Quake," required six people connected to the same “Quake III Arena,” an online shooter server, to reenact an episode of “Friends.” Each performer would log onto the system as a character from the sitcom and type the performance in the messaging system of the game. The dialogue would be simultaneously typed into the messaging system and recited by the player. The performers were constantly killed and respawned to continue the performance. The first performance was conducted in the Digital Media Studio of UNR in 2002, and the second was in the Sheppard Fine Arts Gallery in 2003. This is another instance, much like the intervention in “dead-in-iraq,” where DeLappe uses a computer game for cultural and political criticism. In this computer game, there are no real consequences of dying and the main objective is to kill as many people as possible. The slaughtering of the “Friends” characters as opposed to nameless users works to expose the shameful violence present in many computer games.

Joseph DeLappe combines his knowledge of communications media, concrete materials and on-line gaming with political commentary – stating that games are a huge cultural phenomenon ignored by most of the art world, something he finds challenging.

One of DeLappe's polygon structures, Taliban Hands depicts the hands of a Taliban fighter as depicted in the controversial video game, Medal of Honor. They were intended to creatively embody the complicity of gameplay. This game’s controversy stemmed from the user’s ability to play as a Taliban fighting against US troops. DeLappe created these during his residency in China in 2011. The hands were created by extracting 3D data from the video game for physical construction.

In October 2014 DeLappe initiated the Rubber Stamp Currency Intervention. He created a set of three stamps for the public to purchase and participate in this project. The three stamps consisted of a drone, a person holding their hands above their head, and a wave line. The first stamp was in the shape of a tiny MQ1 Predator Drone called, “In Drones We Trust,” to stamp on the backs of bills in the empty sky over US monuments. These stamps were meant to respond to the drones the US had flying over enemy skies. “Hands Up Don’t Shoot” was the second stamp shaped like a man with his hands above his head. It was a response to ongoing police killings of unarmed black men. The third stamp in this collection was titled, “Sea Level Rising,” to represent the rising sea levels in response to the threat of climate change and rising seas. Participants would stamp one of the three, or a combination of the three, on paper money and then put that money back into circulation after documenting the changes made to the bill. This project is still ongoing.

His art practice also has a participatory aspect as demonstrated in his 2014 In Drones We Trust where he produced Predator drone rubber stamps that were intended to mark currency in a manner that people seeing the money would begin to think about the drones being used to target people in foreign countries.

Killbox (2016), created with Malath Abbas, Tom DeMajo, and Albert Elwin (as the Biome Collective) is a computer game that explores the cost and consequences of drone warfare. The work is a two-player game named after a military term, Kill box, for an area targeted for destruction. The game, a winner of a 2016 Bafta award expresses the inhumanity of drone strikes.

DeLappe was the Director of the Digital Media program in the Art Department of the University of Nevada, Reno until 2017 when he accepted the position of Professor of Games and Tactical Media at Abertay University in Dundee, Scotland. DeLappe was named a Fellow in Fine Arts by the Guggenheim Foundation in 2017.

== Bibliography ==
- Taylor, Dan, Exhibit by creator of ‘Killbox’ drone warfare game open in Sonoma (2017)
- Koebler, Jason, 100 People Around the Country Are Stamping Predator Drones on Cash (2014)
- Mina, An Xiao, “Critiquing America from China.” Hyperallergic: Sensitive to Art & Its Discontents. (2011)
- Ganesan-Ram, Sharmila. “Being Mohandas Gandhi.” The Times of India, India. (2010)
- Mazzarella, William. "Branding the Mahatma." Cultural Anthropology: Journal of the Society for Cultural Anthropology. Volume 25 Issue 1, VA (2010)
- Winet, Jon. “Joseph DeLappe Interview.” Computer Games and Art: Intersections and Interactions. Andy Clarke and Grethe Mitchell editors. Intellect Books, UK/USA (2007)
- Bittani, Matteo and Domenico Quarana. “Joseph DeLappe.” GameScenes: Art and Videogames. Johan & Levi: Italy (2006)
- Craig, Kathleen (June 6, 2006). "Dead in Iraq: It's No Game". Wired.
