= Tinybop =

Children's apps publisher

Tinybop is a Brooklyn based publisher of apps for children.

== History ==
Tinybop is a Brooklyn-based children's media company established in 2011 by Raul Gutierrez. App titles are released in two series: the Explorer's Library - a series of science apps and Digital Toys - series of open-ended construction apps.

== Published apps ==
Explorer's Library Titles:

The Human Body – An anatomy app for children. Released 2013. The company's first app was illustrated by Kelli Anderson and has been downloaded millions of times. Selected for the American Library Association's Notable Children's Media List in 2022. Named Apple App Store's Best of 2013. Winner of the Digital Ehon Yuichi Kimura Prize for Children's Digital Media.

Plants – An app about biomes around the world.

Homes – An app about houses around with world. Illustrated by Tuesday Bassen. Winner of the Parents Gold Choice Award for children's apps.

Simple Machines – A children's physics app about simple machines.

The Earth – An app for children about the geologic Earth illustrated by Sarah Jacoby.

Weather – A children's weather app.

Skyscrapers – A children's app about building tall buildings.

Space – An interactive solar system.

Mammals – A children's app about mammals illustrated by Wenjia Tang. Winner of the Digital Ehon Award for Children's Educational media.

Coral Reef – An app about marine ecosystems. Winner of an Excellence in Early Learning Digital Media Honor from the American Library Association.

State of Matter – An app covering solids, liquids, and gases. Winner of Excellence in Early Learning Digital Media Honor from the American Library Association.

Light and Color – An app about light and color. Selected for The American Library Association's Notable Children's Media List 2023. Winner of the 2022 Yoichi Sakakihara Prize for Children's Media.

Digital Toys Titles:

The Robot Factory – A robot building app for children illustrated by Owen Davey. Apple named The Robot Factory as iPad App of the Year in 2015.

The Everything Machine – A visual coding app for children. The Everything Machine was named Apple's Best of 2015.

Monsters – A monster creation app illustrated by Tianhua Mao.

The Infinite Arcade – An arcade game building app.

Me: A Kids Diary – A digital journal for children. Selected for The American Library Association's Notable Children's Media List 2020.

The Creature Garden – An app that allows children to create fantastical animals illustrated by Natasha Durley. Selected for The American Library Association's Notable Children's Media List 2021.

Things that Go Bump – A multiplayer game set in an enchanted Japanese house, released on Apple Arcade in 2018.
