= YrWall =

YrWall is a Digital Graffiti Wall developed by event company Luma, where designs are created on a large wall using a modified spray paint can. The can contains no paint, instead it has an IR light which is tracked by a computer vision system and the image immediately back-projected onto the wall.

The inbuilt YrWall software has much of the functionality of a typical computer paint program, with a pop-out interface which enables users to change colour, spray width, opacity, work with stencils and use animated items such as swirls, stars, drips and splats. Recent additions to YrWall include options to email a JPEG of the completed design and create personalised stickers and T-shirts.

== Dragons' Den ==
The inventor of YrWall, Tom Hogan, and his business partner, Tim Williams, appeared on Episode 4 of Series 8 of the BBC show Dragons' Den. Seeking investment in YrWall, the entrepreneurs were successful in gaining £50,000 for 40% of the YrWall parent company Lumacoustics from Dragons Deborah Meaden and Peter Jones.

== World's Largest Interactive Graffiti Wall ==
In September 2009 YrWall was used to create the 'World's Largest Interactive Graffiti Wall' at the Bristol Festival, UK. Artists used the standard 3.5 m^{2} YrWall to produce artwork which was in turn projected live onto a 26m x 10m space on the side of the iconic Lloyds amphitheatre building.
