= CADRE Laboratory for New Media =

Academic entity at San José State University

- Established: 1985; 40 years ago
- Laboratory type: Media
- Field of research: Technology, multimedia, sciences, art, design
- Location: San Jose, California, United States
- Founder: Marcia Chamberlain
- Affiliations: San Jose State University
- Website: https://cadre.sjsu.edu/

The CADRE (Computer in Art, Design, Research, and Education) Laboratory for New Media is an American academic entity at San José State University focused on digital media arts research and creation. It is the second oldest education and art media lab in the United States (after the MIT Media Lab).

In his 2002 book, Information Arts: Intersections of Art, Science, And Technology, Stephen Wilson describes the focus of the CADRE laboratory as "the development and testing of emerging technology applications in art, design, education, and communications in the context of critical discourse.”

== History ==
In 1982, San José State University Professor of Art, Marcia Chamberlain launched what was at the time called the CADRE Project. Initially, the CADRE Project was an academic conference which featured concerts, demonstrations, lectures, workshops, tours, panels, a symposium, and a teacher’s Institute throughout the week of January 7–14, 1984. The conference and associated activities took place at several South Bay locations including: San Jose State University, Mission College, West Valley College, and the Triton Museum. A book was also published to commemorate the first year of the conference.

Rather than continuing as a conference, in 1985 the CADRE Project was restructured into a media lab in order to allow the faculty of San Jose State to create a fine arts program which was able to take advantage of the technology-rich environment of the Silicon Valley area. The program offers both BFA and MFA degrees in Digital Media Art. Early donations to the lab were from IBM, Pacific Bell, and Silicon Graphics, who donated a combined total of over $435,000.

In 1995, CADRE started publishing SWITCH, an online journal of new media. Switch's early years featured the net.art movement that coincided with the Dot-com bubble in Silicon Valley.

In 2006, in collaboration with San José Museum of Art and The Tech Museum of Innovation, CADRE hosted the 13th International Symposium of Electronic Arts (ISEA). Coinciding with the ISEA in 2006, CADRE also collaborated with ZERO1: The Art and Technology Network to host the Zero1 Biennial. CADRE has continued to collaborate with Zero1 for each of its subsequent biennials.

From 2008 to 2013, CADRE sponsored Ars Virtua, a virtual art gallery in Second Life.

== Notable alumni ==
- Anne-Marie Schleiner
- C5
- Jodi
- Joseph DeLappe
- Lisa Jevbratt
- Stefan Hechenberger
