= Brody Condon =

American artist

- Born: 1974 (age 51–52); Mexico
- Known for: Visual Art, Performance Art, Media Art
- Website: www.brody.work

Brody Condon (born 1974 Mexico) is an American artist. He facilitates and documents game-like group encounters that experientially probe dissociative phenomena. The resulting immersive situations, video and objects are often made in collaboration with researchers, craftspeople, and public participants.

== Education ==
Condon received an MFA in visual arts from the University of California, San Diego in 2001. He attended the Rijksakademie van Beeldende Kunsten from 2005 to 2006 and the Skowhegan residency in 2001.

== Selected work ==
He was first recognized for the online game intervention and anti-war protest Velvet-Strike, made with artist Anne Marie Schleiner, and most notably exhibited at the 2004 Whitney Biennial. In 2003, with the LA collective C-level, he developed a controversial "documentary computer game" based on the Waco siege. Condon continued to create self-playing software and related work until 2008 that "locates the confluence between the pursuit of body transcendence in 1970's performance... with computer and live roleplaying games."

Condon's work is notable for its early use of Nordic LARP techniques to create immersive role-playing events in an art context that explore “the permeable nature of self, the social dimensions of creativity and the potential of the individual to access alternate states of being.” Notable performances include Case, based on William Gibson's cyberpunk classic Neuromancer at the New Museum of Contemporary Art, and Level Five, a larp based on historic Large Group Awareness Trainings at the Hammer Museum and the 9th Berlin Biennale.

From 2012 to 2016 he collaborated with the Scottish artist Christine Borland on 'Circles of Focus', a research based project exploring human body donation, Neolithic ceramic production, and 18th century physics experiments.

In 2019 he created the cover art and music videos for the record Gallipoli by Beirut (band), using group encounter techniques he developed to assist in the visualization of band leader and cousin Zach Condon's internal states.

== Selected Collections ==
Stedelijk Museum Amsterdam, Los Angeles County Museum of Art, Kadist Foundation, and Albright Knox Gallery.
