= Anne-Marie Schleiner =

American theorist (born 1970)

- Born: December 29, 1970 (age 55); Providence, Rhode Island U.S.
- Occupations: Theorist; Educator; New Media Artist; Performance Artist; Hacktivist; Scholar; Gamer; Curator

Anne-Marie Schleiner (born 1970) is a theorist, an educator, a new media and performance artist, a hacktivist, a scholar, a gamer, and a curator. Her work is focused on gender construction, ludic activism, situationist theory, political power struggles, experimental gaming design theory, urban play, the United States Military, avatar gender reification, the global south, and feminist film theory.

Schleiner's work is influenced by contemporary art, dada, 1970s performance art, net art, and conceptual art.

== Early life and education ==
Schleiner was born in 1970 in Providence, Rhode Island.

In 1992, Schleiner received her B.A. in studio arts at the University of California, Santa Cruz. She continued her education by receiving her MFA in computers in fine art from the CADRE Program at San Jose State University Her doctoral dissertation, "Ludic Mutation: The Player's Power to Change the Game" was written under the supervision of Professor Dr. Mireille D. Rosello at the Amsterdam School for Cultural Analysis at the University of Amsterdam and submitted in 2012.

== Career ==
Many of Schleiner's works are examples of video game art. Velvet-Strike, completed in 2002, is a modification to the military simulation game Counter-Strike. This work was created with Brody Condon and Joan Leandre. They invited other gamers to create patches, known as sprays, visual cyber graffiti that users would download, install, and use by shooting the sprays instead of bullets and the protest would then appear in the game. Velvet-Strike was featured in the 2004 Whitney Biennial. Another example of video game art, Operation Urban Terrain (OUT): A Live Action Wireless Gaming Urban Intervention mixes alternate reality gaming with public performance. Using a portable internet connection, a projector and a team of technicians, the artist critiqued the Military Operations in Urban Territory (MOUT) military policies by playing and projecting America's Army at several places within New York City during the ongoing Republican National Convention of 2004.

In 2003, her work H711 was included in an exhibition at the New Museum.

Schleiner is credited with originating the concept of 'Ludic Mutation', which addresses the role that players of videogames take in changing a game. This happens in two registers, both in the design of the game itself, which is acknowledged as changed through the player's production and most especially in the reception of a game, which may mutate meaning away from the game author's original intent. As such it can be read as a challenge to the theory of procedural rhetoric, and as a contribution to the activist game and newsgame strands of so-called 'Games for Change'. Ludic Mutation also forms the sub-heading of her 2017 book 'The Player's Power to Change the Game: Ludic Mutation.'

=== Teaching ===
Since 2017, Schleiner has been teaching at the Department of Design, University of California, Davis. Previously, Schleiner was an instructor at the Department of Communications and New Media at the National University of Singapore, teaching for almost a decade there.
