= Kelli Anderson =

American artist and designer

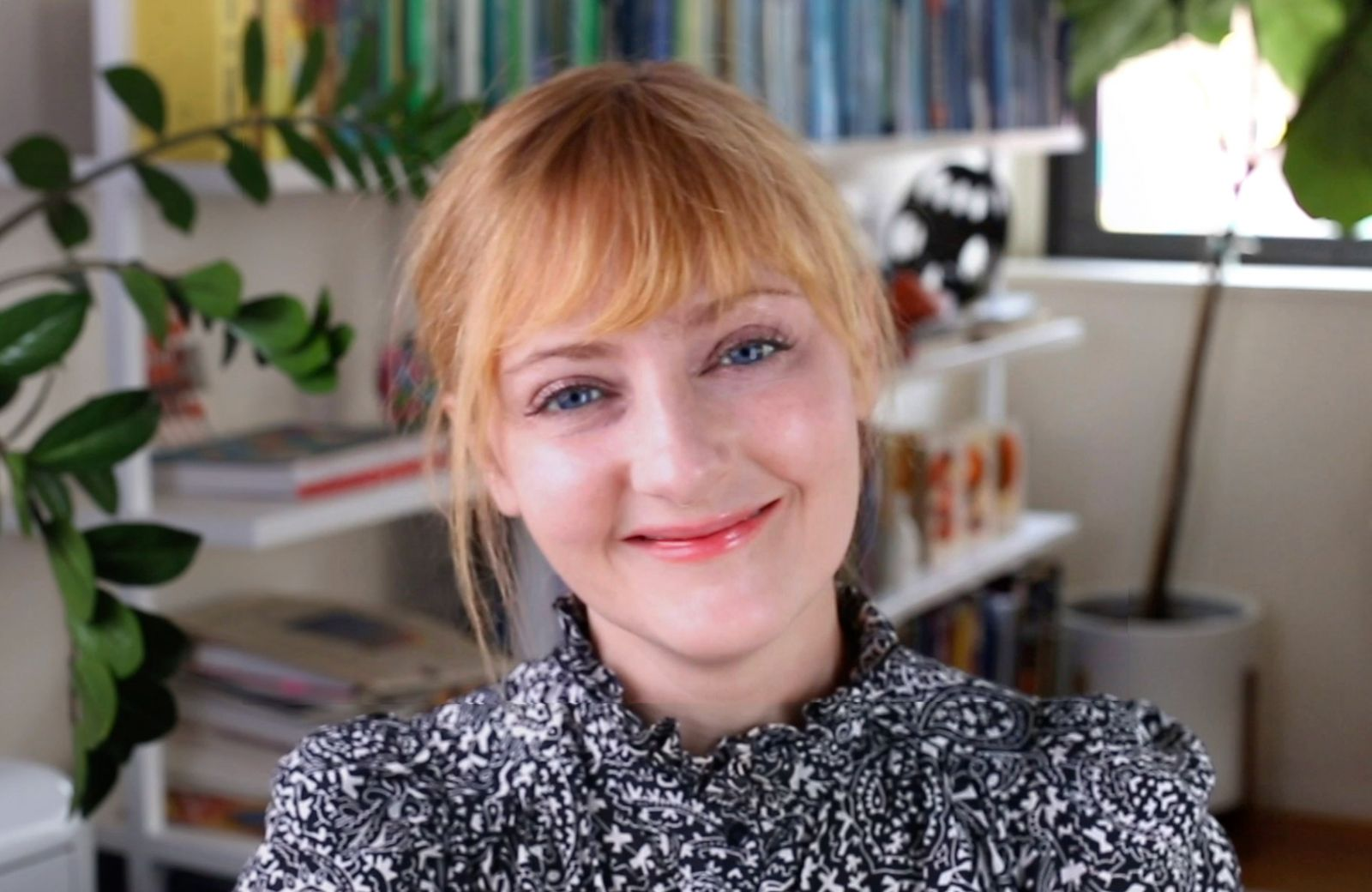
- Born: New Orleans, LA
- Education: University of Louisiana at Lafayette; Pratt Institute
- Notable work: This Book is a Camera, This Book is a Planetarium
- Style: Conceptual art, graphic design
- Website: https://kellianderson.com

Kelli Anderson is an American graphic artist and paper engineer who works with a wide range of mediums, including infographics, branding design, pop-up books and risograph animations. She has taught art and graphic design at Cooper Union, NYU, and SFPC, given a TED talk on disruptive art, and has published 3 books. Her work has been published by NPR, MoMA, Chronicle Books, and The New Yorker.

== Education ==
Anderson received a BFA degree at the University of Louisiana at Lafayette, followed by an MFA and MS at the Pratt Institute of New York. She wrote her master's thesis on nuclear waste markers.

== Career ==
In 2013 Anderson illustrated The Human Body, a children's app by Tinybop Inc.

Anderson collaborated as a graphic designer with The Yes Men on a counterfeit New York Times newspaper. The hoax involved blanketing New York City with fake editions of the paper completely rewritten with articles describing a utopian present reality. Anderson also designed for publications related to Occupy Wall Street.

In 2015, Anderson was granted the Adobe Creative Residency, which included being a keynote speaker at Adobe Max. She also spent five years working part-time in Special Collections at the American Museum of Natural History in Manhattan, and as an Osher Fellow at Exploratorium.

Anderson's work spans a broad range of digital and tangible mediums, and from the playful to the political or a mix of both. Her infographics include Buying a Gun in America for Mayors Against Illegal Guns, which addressed the ease with which a gun can be obtained. Anderson is also well known for her interactive paper work such as "The Paper Record Player", a wedding invitation that plays music; and her books This Book Is a Planetarium and This Book is a Camera, which was published by the MoMA. In 2013, she created the installation "Book Covers, Re-imagined in Paper", a 100% paper installation done for the New York City Public Library with Maria Popova. Anderson has taught paper engineering at Cooper Union as well as typography and risograph animation.

There is a strong theme of bringing the two-dimensional to life in Anderson's work, exemplified in her sculptural paper pieces and pop-ups. This theme is also evident in her animation work where a handcrafted quality is often present such as in her work for NPR's video "Talking While Female" or her music video for They Might Be Giants which used a combination of stop motion and compositing techniques. Even when working with the purely digital, such as creating interactive anatomy for the Tinybop Human Body app, Anderson's work retains a quality of texture and tangibility. She has also designed for Russ n' Daughters and Momofuku, and Munchery.

Recently, she has been a featured speaker at MIT Media Lab and animated in collaboration with Yo Yo Ma on a series of Richard Feynman poems.

== Works ==
- The Human Body, published by Tinybop Inc. (2013)
- This Book is a Planetarium, published by Chronicle Books (2017)
- This Book is a Camera, published by MoMA (2018)
- Powers of Ten, with Adam Pickard (2022)
- Alphabet in Motion: An ABC Pop-up Book on How Letters Get their Shape (Summer 2025)

== Awards ==
- Nominated for the Cooper Hewitt / Smithsonian National Design Award (in Communication Design), 2023
- Ars Electronica Award of Distinction, 2009
