= David Campbell (Australian political scientist) =

Australian political scientist (born 1961)

- Born: 15 August 1961 (age 65); Perth, Australia
- Education: Australian National University
- Scientific career
- Fields: Political scientist
- Workplaces: Durham University, England; University of Newcastle upon Tyne, England
- Website: www.david-campbell.org

David Campbell (born 15 August 1961) is an Australian political scientist. He is known for his writing on photography and post-realism.

== Career ==
David Campbell graduated with a PhD from the Australian National University in 1990.

From 1997 to 2004, he was Professor of International Politics at Newcastle University (formally University of Newcastle upon Tyne) in England. At the university he was the project manager for the Culture Lab, a four million pound centre for digital media and creative practice, it opened in 2006.

His publications include National Deconstruction: Violence, Identity and Justice in Bosnia in 1998. The International Forum Bosnia named it 'Book of the Year 1999', as the best English-language publication dealing with Bosnia and Herzegovina. The book was translated for publication in Sarajevo in 2003.

Between 2004 and 2010, he was Professor of Cultural and Political Geography at Durham University.

By 2005, Campbell's research had increasingly focused on particular elements of visual culture. In particular, he concentrated on photography representing famine, atrocity, and war. He was one of the curators for the Imagining Famine photography exhibition. It opened at The Guardian's newsroom in London, in August 2005.

In 2008, he completed a project on the visual economy of HIV/AIDS as a security issue.

In January 2016, he became manager of communications and marketing for World Press Photo in Amsterdam.

He has also worked for the Australian Senate, Johns Hopkins University and Keele University.

=== Qualifications and membership ===
Campbell is Honorary Professor of Geography at Durham University in the UK. He is also Honorary Professor in the School of Political Science and International Studies at the University of Queensland, Australia and a member of the Durham Centre for Advanced Photography Studies.

== Publications ==
- (1989) The Social Basis of Australian and New Zealand Security Policy, Canberra, Peace Research Centre.
- (1990) Global Inscription: How Foreign Policy Constitutes the United States, Alternatives, vol. 15, no. 3.
- (1992) Writing Security, United States Foreign Policy and the Politics of Identity, Minneapolis: University of Minnesota Press.
- (1993) The Political Subject of Violence, edited with Michael Dillon, Manchester: Manchester University Press.
- (1993) Politics Without Principle: Sovereignty, Ethics and the Narratives of the Gulf War, Boulder, Lynne Rienner Publishers.
- (1999) Apartheid Cartography: The Political Anthropology And Spatial Effects Of International Diplomacy In Bosnia Political Geography 18:4 (May 1999), pp. 395–435.
- (1998: 2nd edition, 1992: 1st edition) Writing Security: United States Foreign Policy and the Politics of Identity. Minneapolis/Manchester: University of Minnesota Press/Manchester University Press.
- (1998) National Deconstruction: Violence, Identity and Justice in Bosnia, Minneapolis: University of Minnesota Press.
- (1999) Moral Spaces: Rethinking Ethics and World Politics, edited with Michael J. Shapiro, Minneapolis: University of Minnesota Press.
- (2001) International Engagements: The Politics of North American International Relations Theory. Political Theory 29:3 (June 2001), pp. 432–48.
- (2001) Justice and International Order: The Case of Bosnia and Kosovo in Ethics and International Affairs: Extent and Limits, Jean-Marc Coicaud and Daniel Warner (eds.), United Nations University Press.
- (2002) Atrocity, Memory, Photography: Imaging the Concentration Camps of Bosnia - The Case of ITN versus Living Marxism, Part II. Journal of Human Rights 1:2, pp. 143–72.
- (2002) Atrocity, Memory, Photography: Imaging the Concentration Camps of Bosnia - The Case of ITN versus Living Marxism, Part I. Journal of Human Rights 1:1, p. 1-33.
- (2002) Horrific Blindness: Problems with Photographs of the Dead, in Debbie Lisle (ed.) Horrific Views: Tourism, Voyeurism and Spectacle, Free Association Books.
- (2002) Salgado and the Sahel: Documentary Photography and the Imaging of Famine, in Mediating Internationals, Francois Debrix and Cindy Weber (eds.), University of Minnesota Press.
- (2008) The New Pluralism: William Connolly and the Contemporary Global Condition, edited with Mort Schoolman, Durham NC: Duke University Press.
