= Nortd Labs =

Research and art collective

NORTD Labs
- Founded: 2006; 20 years ago in New York City, U.S.
- Founders: Addie Wagenknecht; Stefan Hechenberger
- Website: nortd.com

Nortd Labs a.k.a. NOR_/D is an international research and development collaborative dedicated to the merging of open source art, architecture, software and system design. NORTD Labs is also a studio of creative thought that engages science, art and design.

Historically, NORTD Labs has developed open-source hardware such as CUBIT in 2007, which has been built and used by thousands of people, labs, hacker-spaces and universities worldwide. NORTD Labs work is released under various open licenses.

According to co-founder Addie Wagenknecht, NORTD Labs "wants to change how people create, build and consume objects. Living in a software/internet powered world we forget about how physical products are created. We want to allow makers to feel empowered and to lose the black box feel of closed systems." NORTD labs commitment is to support open values and the public domain through the use of open licenses, support for open entrepreneurship and the admonishment of copyright and intellectual property patents in exchange for support of open licenses.

Although NORTD Labs work is typically highly technical in nature, they define themselves as artists, not engineers.

== History ==
NORTD Labs was founded in 2006 by Addie Wagenknecht and Stefan Hechenberger during graduate school at New York University and established officially during a research fellowship at the New York-based Eyebeam Art and Technology Center in 2007–2008. Most of NORTD Labs researchers and collaborators are based in New York City as well as Europe. Their work is documented and published online at the NORTD Labs website.

NORTD Labs has recently held fellowships at Carnegie Mellon University STUDIO for Creative Inquiry and CultureLab UK.

== Founders ==
Addie Wagenknecht: Co-founder (United States)
Stefan Hechenberger: Co-founder (Austria)

== Select collaborators ==
Scott Snibbe, Laban Motion Player
Free Art and Technology Lab, BrickiPhone
OpenFrameworks, OpenCV library
Carnegie Mellon School of Architecture dFAB, Optimization of Parenting

== Notable projects ==
- Lasersaur, 2011
- Publicity, 2010
- Black Hawk Paint, 2009
- TouchKit, 2008
- ShadowProject, 2008
- CUBIT, 2006
