= Maria Popova =

Bulgarian writer

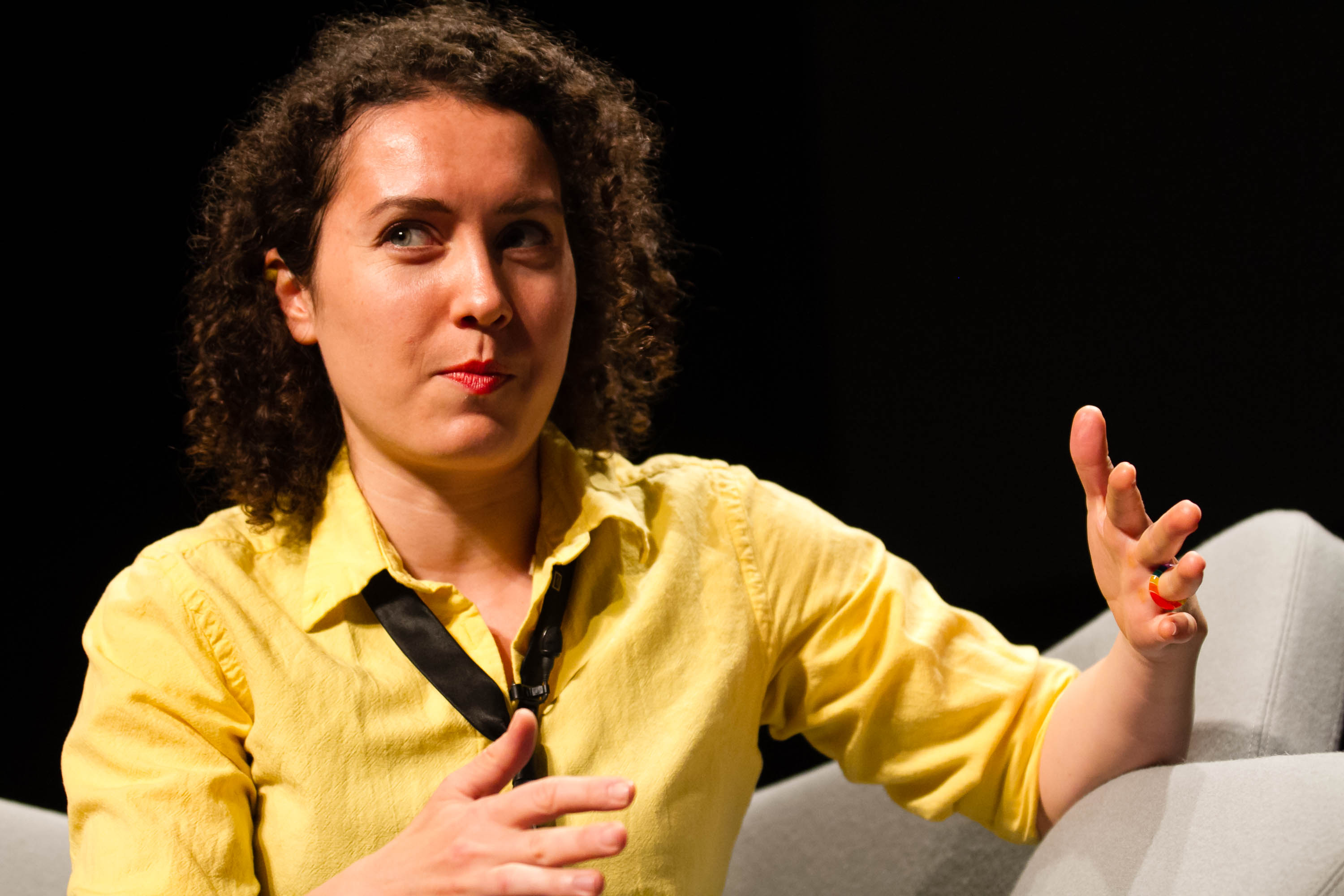
- Popova in 2014
- Born: 1983 or 1984 (age 41–42); Sofia, Bulgaria
- Education: University of Pennsylvania
- Occupations: Writer, blogger, and critic
- Website: themarginalian.org

Maria Popova (Bulgarian: Мария Попова; born 1983 or 1984) is a Bulgarian-born, American-based essayist, book author, poet, and writer of literary and arts commentary and cultural criticism that has found wide appeal both for her writing and for the visual stylistics that accompany it.

In 2006, she started the blog Brain Pickings, which features her writing on books, the arts, philosophy, culture, and other subjects. The blog was renamed to The Marginalian upon its 15th birthday in 2021.

In addition to her writing and related speaking engagements, she has served as an MIT Futures of Entertainment Fellow, as the editorial director at the higher education social network Lore, and has written for The New York Times, The Atlantic, Wired UK, and other publications. Since 2010, she has resided in Brooklyn, New York. She is the creator of "The Universe in Verse", a large-scale annual celebration of science and the natural world through poetry.

== Early life ==
Maria Popova was born in 1983 or 1984 in Sofia, Bulgaria. Popova's parents are ethnic Bulgarians who, as noted by Bruce Feiler for The New York Times, "met as teenage exchange students in Russia ... [h]er father ... an engineering student who later became an Apple salesman ... her mother ... studying library science". In interview, Popova states that in childhood, one of her grandmothers often read to her from a collection of encyclopedias. As recounted in interview to Geoff Wolinetz of Bundle.com, Popova first worked when she was about 8 years old, making the Bulgarian yarn folk art dolls called martenitsas, worn beginning on the first of March where Popova describes selling them on the street as American children would sell drinks at a lemonade stand.

== Undergraduate education and early work ==
Popova graduated from the American College of Sofia in Bulgaria, a secondary school, in 2003. She relocated to attend the University of Pennsylvania, where she earned a degree in communications, though for years, up to 2012, her grandmother had wanted her to get an MBA. Popova paid for her tuition by working four part-time jobs on top of a full college course load: as an advertising representative for The Daily Pennsylvanian, as an intern for a local writer, as an employee for a work-study job at the Annenberg Center for the Performing Arts, and as a staff member for a small start-up advertising agency in Philadelphia.

In 2005, while Popova worked at an advertising agency, she noticed that her co-workers were circulating information within the advertising industry around the office for inspiration. However, Popova thought creativity was better sparked with exposure to information outside of the industry one was familiar with. In an effort to stir creativity, she regularly sent emails to the entire office containing five things that had nothing to do with advertising, but were meaningful, interesting, or important. Because of the popularity of the emails, Popova felt that there was an "intellectual hunger for that sort of cross-disciplinary curiosity and self-directed learning."

She enrolled in a night class to learn web design, took Brain Pickings online, and let the project grow organically.

== Relocation to the United States ==
Popova describes the period of coming to the U.S. to Hannah Levintova of Mother Jones; in this 2012 interview she states:

I didn't immigrate. I'm here on a visa, and I'm not an American citizen. I don't know if you followed the ... situation in 2007 and 2008? ... Every year, the government has a visa quota—they will give, say, 65,000 H1-B work visas for foreigners who are going to work in the country for an American company. And so, normally, they would open up the application process, and the quota would run out in the first three weeks... So, after graduation, I had a job [lined up], and we applied for that visa, but that was the year 'Visagate' happened: The first day of applications, for the first time in history, the government got three times their quota on the very first day. So, they panicked and thought the only thing to do was to make it a raffle for everyone that applied on the first day, and then automatically reject everyone after that. So, we'd filed for the first day, but I was in the two-thirds that didn't get it, so the whole envelope got returned unopened. So then I got the OPT [Optional Practical Training]—which entitles you to a year's worth of work with a company within the scope of your major. We tried again in 2008, and same thing—the whole envelope got returned unopened. So, I had to leave the country! I went back to Bulgaria for a year.

Popova describes returning to Bulgaria in 2008 in interview to the Bulgarian news journal Capital, and how she and a trio of friends organized a conference modeled after the American TED Talks, which they called "TEDxBG". Popova further describes the outcome of the events—her eventual visa receipt—to Mother Jones: "When the application process lightened up... I moved to LA—which I really resented more than anyone's ever resented a city in the history of resenting cities. And now I'm finally in New York, and I'm here to stay." As of 2012, she was living in Brooklyn.

== Work as a writer ==
If something interests me and is both timeless and timely, I write about it. Much of what is published online is content designed to be dead within hours, so I find most of my material offline. I gravitate more and more towards historical things that are somewhat obscure and yet timely in their sensibility and message.

— Popova in December 2012

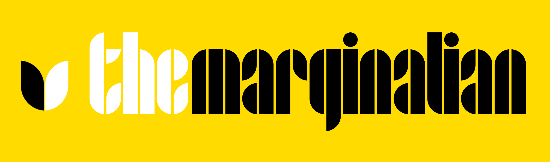
Logo for The Marginalian

Popova has written for The Atlantic, Wired UK, GOOD, The Huffington Post, and NiemanLab.

In 2006, she began the blog Brain Pickings as an email sent each week to seven of her friends. On October 22, 2021, the blog's 15th anniversary, Popova renamed it The Marginalian, writing that the original name had been an "ill-fitting" choice made by "a twenty-two-year-old immigrant in whose ear the tired puns and idioms of a non-native language rang fresh and full of wonder." Krista Tippett in On Being describes it as "[n]ow a website, Twitter feed, and weekly digest... cover[ing] a wide variety of cultural topics: history, current events, and images and texts from the past." It includes several sections and has graphics, photographs, and illustrations in addition to written content. As of December 2012, The Guardian was reporting that the blog had "1.2 million readers a month and 3m page views". Anne-Marie Slaughter describes Popova's blog as "like walking into the Museum of Modern Art and having somebody give you a customized, guided tour."

Popova is also author of Figuring, published by Random House in 2019, and The Snail with the Right Heart: A True Story, published by Enchanted Lion Books in 2021, which is a story about science, the poetry of existence, and is "inspired by a beloved young human" in Popova's own life. She is co-editor of A Velocity of Being: Letters to A Young Reader, published by Enchanted Lion Books in 2018. Since 2017, Popova has also created and hosted The Universe in Verse, an annual charitable event at Pioneer Works in Brooklyn celebrating science through poetry, which she adapted into a 2024 illustrated book of the same title.

In Figuring, which appeared at No. 5 on the New York Times bestseller list upon publication, Popova examines connections between a variety of scientists, writers, and artists, many of them women, and how they created meaning in their lives. Figuring won the 2019 Los Angeles Times Book Prize in the Science and Technology category.

=== Side projects and partnerships ===
In addition to running The Marginalian (formerly known as Brain Pickings), Popova has a number of side projects. She maintains a Twitter account, and a newsletter. In 2012, she created the "Literary Jukebox", a sub-site where she matches quotes from books with songs. "Music, for me, is an enormous trigger of mnemonic associations – of time, place, mood, emotion, the smell of fresh-cut grass behind your best friend's house when you were 18 and first heard that song."

Popova also has various partnerships with prominent organizations. She is an MIT Futures of Entertainment Fellow. Additionally, Popova serves as the editorial director at the higher education social network Lore, run by Noodle. She edits Explore, a partnership site with the Noodle educational search company.

=== Content selection and output ===
Popova filters through the large amounts of content she reads each day through a detailed selection process. When choosing content for The Marginalian, she asks herself three things:

Is it interesting enough to leave the reader with something – a thought, an idea, a question – after the immediate fulfillment of the self-contained reading or viewing experience? Is it evergreen in a way that makes it just as interesting in a month or a year? Am I able to provide enough additional context – historical background, related past articles, complementary reading or viewing material – or build a pattern around it to make it worth for the reader?

She says she aims to "share content that is meaningful. Often, it's timeless." Popova also seeks out content that has narrative. As she states, "Curation is a form of pattern recognition – pieces of information or insight which over time amount to an implicit point of view." Popova publishes this information in tweet form when she does not have much to add. On the other hand, she publishes this as blog posts when she feels she can deepen the subject with historical background or additional materials.

=== Awards and recognitions ===
Maria Popova has received numerous instances of media recognition for her work. In 2012, she was named number 51 of the 100 most creative people in business by Fast Company magazine. Popova was featured in 30 under 30 by Forbes as one of the most influential individuals in Media and was listed on "The 140 Best Twitter Feeds of 2012 List" by Time magazine. Popova's work has also been spotlighted and profiled in publications such as The New York Times.

== Criticism ==
=== Affiliate advertising ===
Popova has been very vocal about her dislike for traditional advertising, and has repeatedly expressed her pride on being advertising-free:

It doesn't put the reader's best interests first – it turns them into a sellable eyeball, and sells that to advertisers. As soon as you begin to treat your stakeholder as a bargaining chip, you're not interested in broadening their intellectual horizons or bettering their life. I don't believe in this model of making people into currency. You become accountable to advertisers, rather than your reader.

In 2013, Popova received criticism on how she championed her site to be "ad-free" and a "labor of love" that requires reader donations to sustain itself, while she covertly received revenue from affiliate advertising from Amazon. Tom Bleymaier, founder of a startup in Palo Alto, California, wrote a post on an anonymous Tumblr blog calling Popova out for her actions. Using his own calculations, Bleymaier extrapolated that Popova could make anywhere between $240,000 and $432,000 a year with these affiliate advertisements.

This received much media attention from sources such as Reuters and PandoDaily.

This incident has sparked a more general debate on the Internet about whether or not affiliate advertisements are "sneaky" or "deceptive". Popova has since updated her donation page on Brain Pickings to acknowledge the fact that she receives income from affiliate advertisements.

=== Curator's Code ===
In 2012, Popova created The Curator's Code, a project (now suspended) by Popova with input from designer Kelli Anderson. The Curator's Code is a code of conduct for curators on the web to use. This proposed method is an attempt to codify source attribution on the internet to ensure that the intellectual labor of information discovery is honored. Under the code, the "via" symbol indicates direct discovery, where the "hat tip" symbol indicates an indirect link of discovery.

== Personal life ==
Popova has sought to maintain a degree of personal anonymity, with emphasis on her writing rather than on herself.
