= Simone Browne =

Canadian author and educator

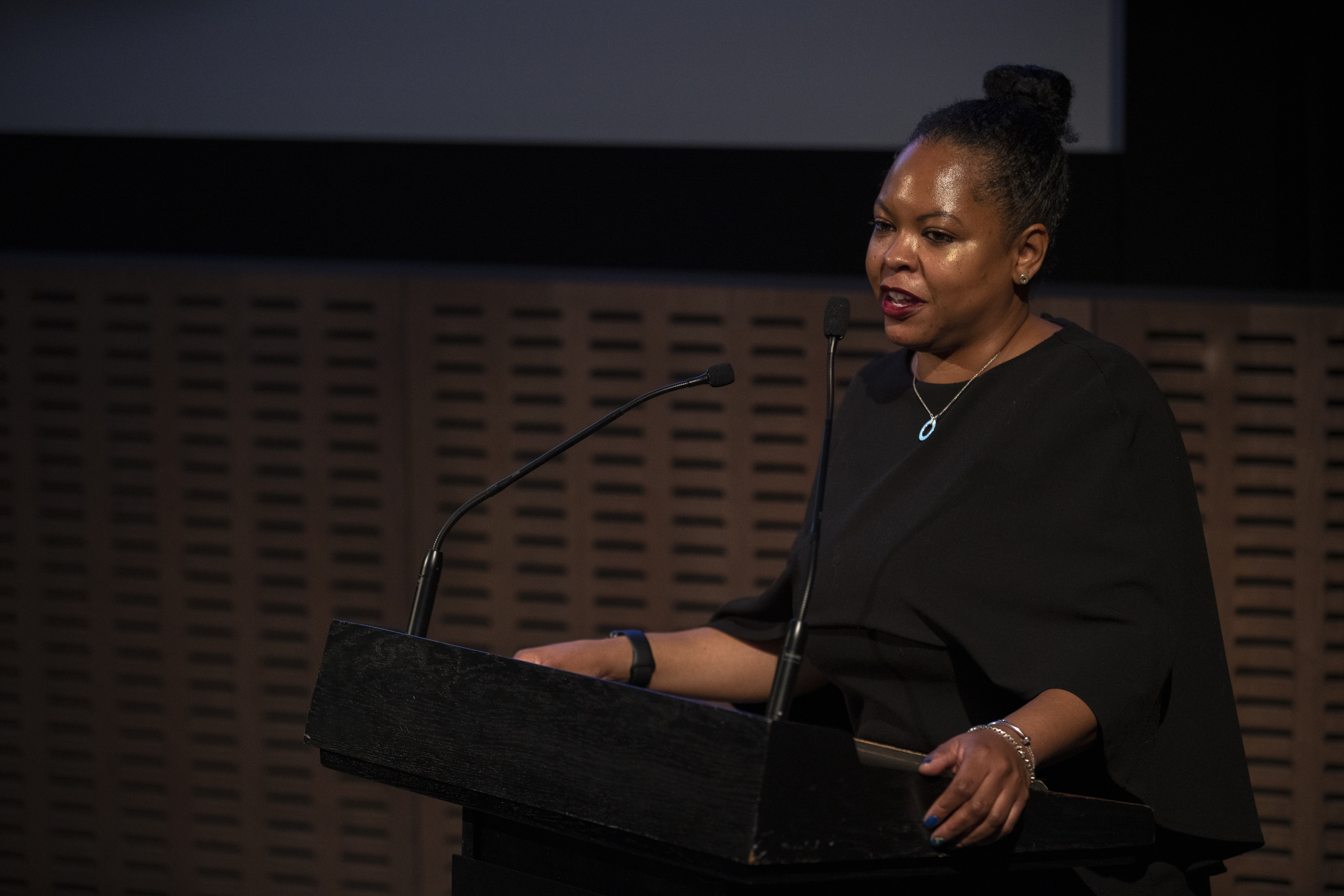
Simone Browne speaking at the 2019 Art+Feminism Wikipedia Edit-a-thon at The Museum of Modern Art, New York.

Simone Arlene Browne (born 1973) is an author and educator. She is on the faculty at the University of Texas at Austin, and the author of Dark Matters: On the Surveillance of Blackness.

== Early life and education ==
Browne was born in 1973, and grew up in Toronto, Ontario, where she received a BA (with honors), MA, and PhD at the Ontario Institute for Studies in Education in the Department of Sociology and Equity Studies at the University of Toronto. Her 2001 Masters thesis was titled Surveilling the Jamaican body, leisure imperialism, immigration and the Canadian imagination. Her doctoral dissertation in 2007 was titled Trusted travellers: the identity-industrial complex, race and Canada's permanent resident card.

== Career ==
Browne is a professor of Black Studies in the Department of African and African Diaspora Studies at the University of Texas at Austin. Her most recent book, Dark Matters: On the Surveillance of Blackness, published by Duke University Press in 2015, presents a case to consider race and blackness as central to the field of surveillance studies, and investigates the roots of present-day surveillance in practices originating in slavery and the Jim Crow era. Javier Arbona of the University of California, Davis, said "her wholly original scholarship best captures new kinds of thinking and theorizing in surveillance studies".

She is a member of Deep Lab, a "congress of cyber-feminist researchers."

She is also on the executive board of HASTAC, a virtual organization led by a Steering Committee consisting of innovators from a variety of disciplines.

Her work, "Not Only Will I Stare," involves the curation of an exhibit about surveillance through black women artists at the University of Texas at Austin. The exhibit "used the space to showcase selected artists and artwork which reflect the intersections and evolving history of surveillance and the Black community."

== Awards, honors ==
- Presidential Visiting Fellow for the 2018–2019 academic year, Yale University
- Winner of the 2016 Best Book Prize, Surveillance Studies Network
- Winner of the 2016 Lora Romero First Book Prize, American Studies Association
- Winner of the 2015 Donald McGannon Award for Social and Ethical Relevance in Communications Technology Research
