= Geraldine Juarez =

Mexican-Swedish visual artist

Geraldine Juárez (born Mexico City, 1977) is a Mexican and Swedish visual artist. She lives in Gothenburg, Sweden.

== Life and career ==
=== Early life and education ===
Juárez is a Mexican and Swedish visual artist working with time-based media, sculpture and performance. She was fellow of Eyebeam's AIR studio from 2002 to 2003 and Senior Fellow at the Production Studio from 2006 to 2008. In 2017, Juárez graduated from the Master Program in Fine Art from Valand Academy.

== Artistic career ==
In 2002 she was granted a fellowship at Eyebeam due to various projects she was involved in. Juarez's art includes, but not limited to installation, media based, object production, video art and collaboration. She left the organization, but in 2006 she returned to Eyebeam as a senior fellow in the Production Lab, where her practice evolved to embrace code, electronics and waste while working with Adam Bobbette under the name of Forays. During her fellowship in Eyebeam she worked on visual effects sequences for Alex Rivera's "Sleep Dealer". She has been resident artist at inCUBATE in Chicago, Timelab in Belgium, Fabrikken in Denmark and JA.Ca in Brazil.

== Artist's Work ==
=== Forays (2006 -2010) ===
Forays was a collaboration between Adam Bobbette and Juárez who met as residents in Eyebeam in 2006. With her work with Forays, Juárez started sourcing her materials for free.In their work they will get resources through dumpster diving or through the website freecycle. Freecycle is a website where people post household items or clothes they no longer want or need for free. In their manifesto they stated "a foray must be compelled by the ethics of copyleft, hacking, alternative forms of exchange, and released within the public domain." Most of their works included manuals for create infrastructures describes as open source architecture. Open source architecture is essentially artists sharing build plans for various models through media sources. The technique of how a structure was built is the takeaway from the movement among newer media artists.

== Exhibits ==
Juárez work has been shown internationally in exhibitions including "University of Disaster" at the 57th Venice Biennale in Italy, Show Me The Money at Northern Gallery of Contemporary Art in United Kingdom, Situations Placeholder in Fotomuseum Winterthur and 100 Years of Copyright in Haus der Kulturen der Welt in Germany. Early exhibitions include Interference, Feedback and Other Options in Eyebeam (NYC), Creative Times’s Democracy in America (NYC), Secret Project Robot (NYC), State of the Art: New York at URBIS Manchester (UK), Actions: What you can do with the city at Centre for Canadian Architecture (CA), G.R.L.| F.A.T. World Summit at CREAM (Japan) Los Impolíticos at Pan Pallazo delle Arti in Napoli (Italy), DEEP NORTH at Transmediale (Berlin) and festivals such Piksel, Futuresonic, PixelAche, Conflux and Transitio_MX.
