= Digital graffiti =

Light-projected artwork

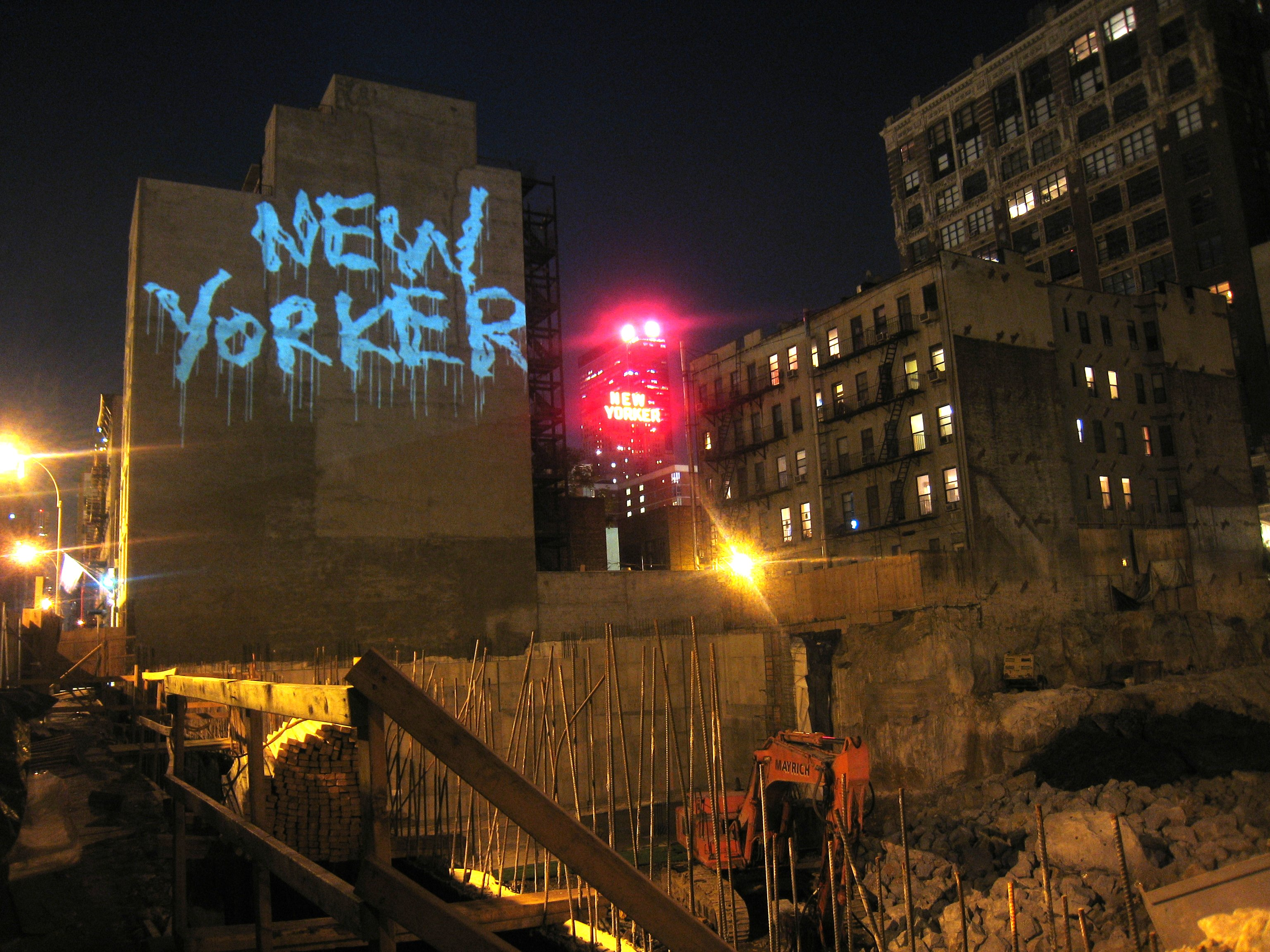
Laser graffiti on a building in Hell's Kitchen, New York, 2007

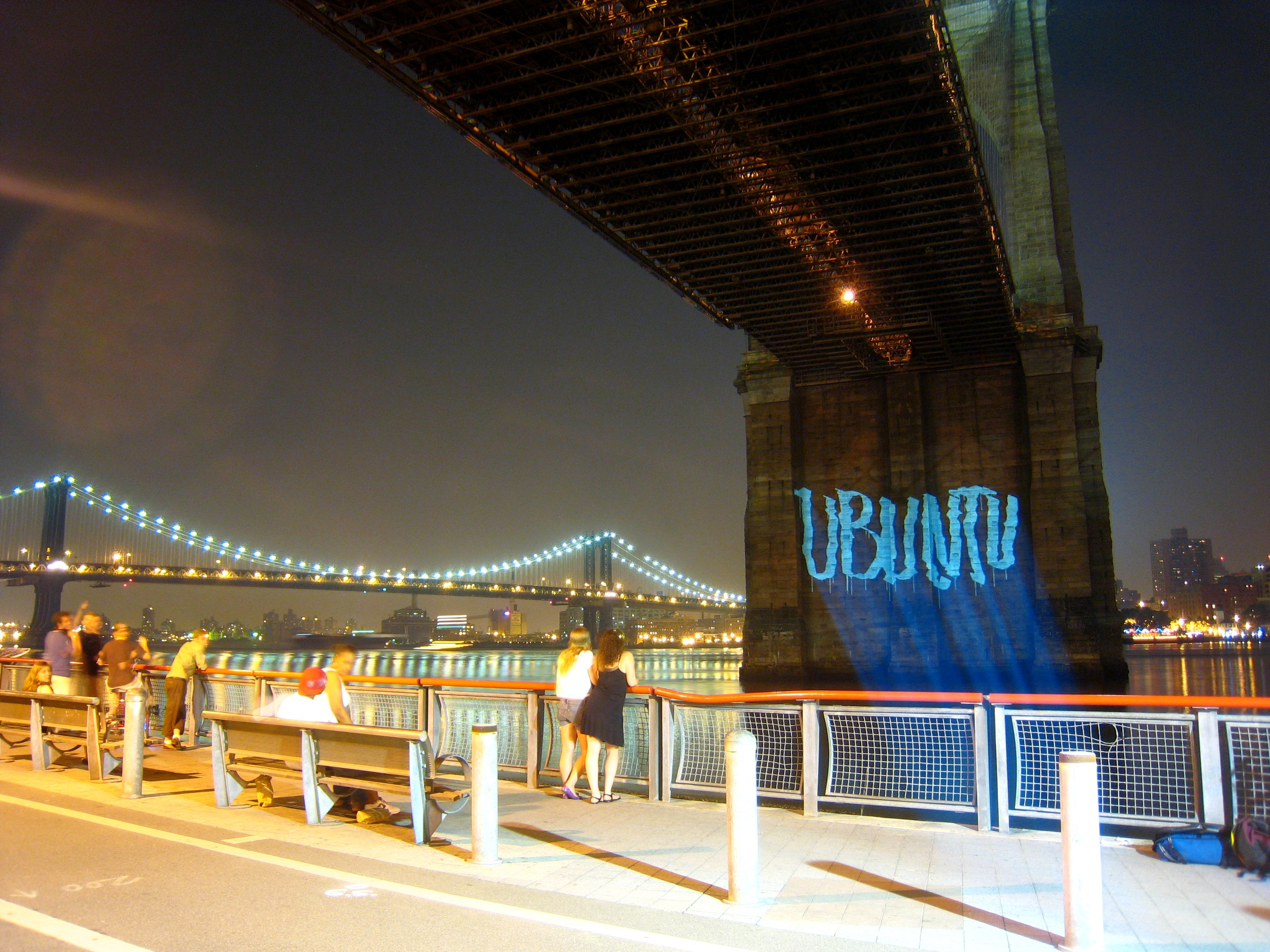
Laser graffiti being projected onto Brooklyn Bridge, 2007

Digital graffiti is the act of creating graffiti art using a computer vision system. Various groups and companies have pioneered digital graffiti since technology advances made it possible. Most notably is the Graffiti Research Lab based in the US with their L.A.S.E.R. Tag system.

Inspired by the New York laser graffiti movement, in 2008 the first commercially available digital graffiti wall was produced by Luma, named the YrWall. A specially adapted spray can emit IR light instead of paint, which is then tracked by a computer vision system to recreate the "sprayed" image onto the wall using a projector.

Any system that allows art to be created on a large scale similarly to more traditional graffiti falls under the heading digital graffiti.

Cisco Systems has released a mobile application called [Digital Graffiti] patented by Cisco Systems, Inc. to allow people to place messages of varying size, color, length of time visible, and viewing distance (say visible from 20 feet away) on a physical location, say a building, an office, a cubicle, or a specific location using their augmented reality mobile application. This message alerts other visitors approaching the message coordinates by playing the Cisco chime and the mobile user's country origin filter when the app was installed. It is like a virtual yellow stickie note, that can be delivered to an individual when they arrive at a message location. Digital Graffiti leverages the Cisco MSE location server (which tracks users mobile devices and provides x, y coordinates of the mobile devices over Wi-Fi).

== See also ==
- Virtual graffiti
