= Jillian York =

American activist, journalist and travel writer (born 1982)

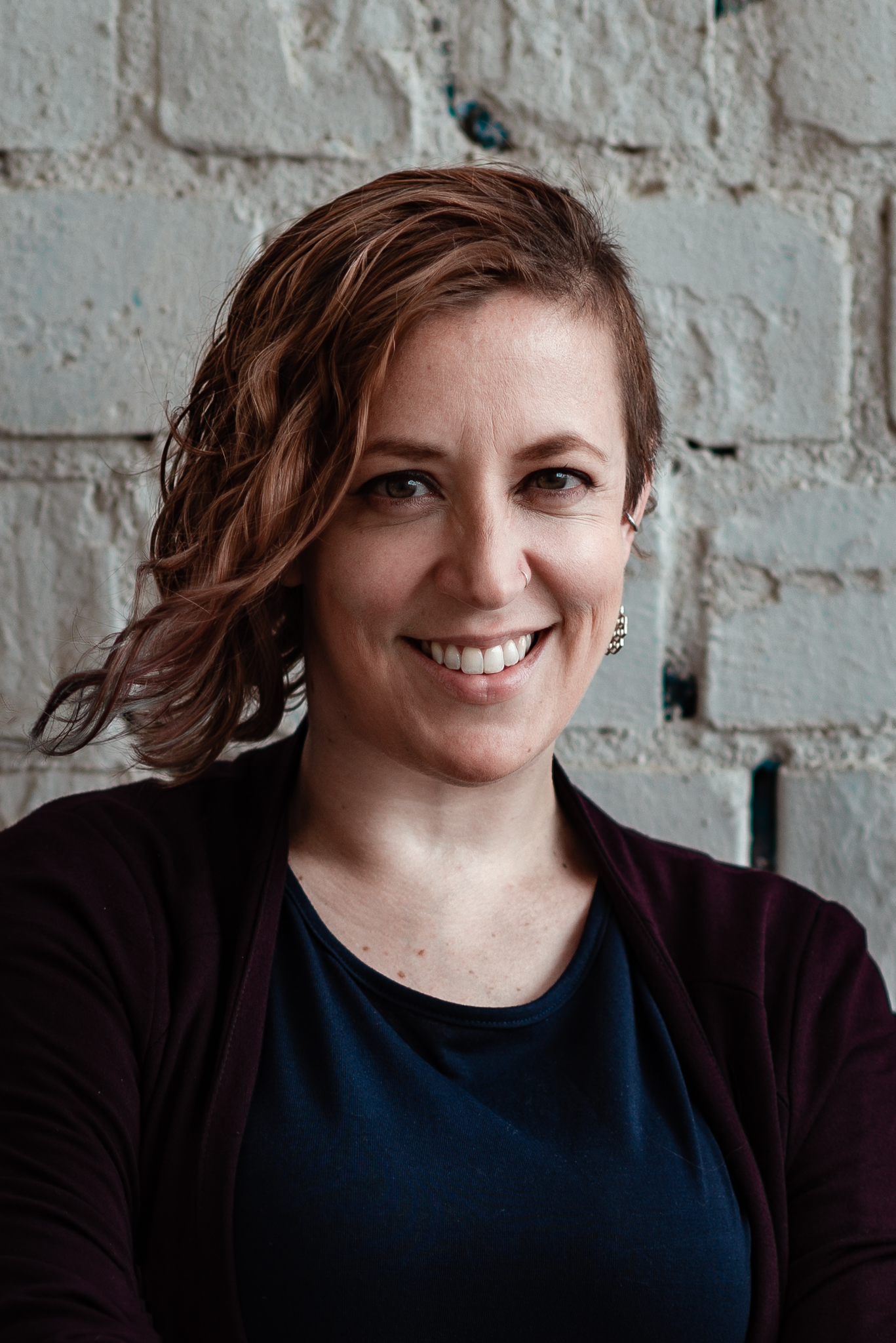
- Jillian York in 2019
- Born: May 18, 1982 (age 44); Dover, New Hampshire, U.S.
- Education: Binghamton University (BA)
- Occupation: Director of International Freedom of Expression at the Electronic Frontier Foundation
- Board member of: IFEX
- Website: jilliancyork.com

Jillian C. York (born May 18, 1982) is an American free-expression activist and author. She serves as Director of International Freedom of Expression at the Electronic Frontier Foundation (EFF), and a founding member of Deep Lab. She is the author of Silicon Values: The Future of Free Speech Under Surveillance Capitalism and Morocco - Culture Smart!: the essential guide to customs & culture.

== Career ==
From 2004 to 2007, York spent considerable time in Morocco. In 2006, York authored Morocco – Culture Smart!: The Essential Guide to Customs & Culture, a travel book on Morocco. In an article written in 2011, York wrote about the function of blogs and social media sites such as Facebook providing Moroccans a forum for discussions and information deprived by the mainstream Moroccan media.

In 2008, she joined the Berkman Center for Internet & Society, a research center at Harvard University that focuses on the study of cyberspace, where she worked on the OpenNet Initiative, a joint project whose goal is to monitor and report on internet filtering and surveillance practices by nations, and Herdict, and conducted research on distributed denial-of-service attacks.

In 2011, she moved to the Electronic Frontier Foundation, where she is the director of international freedom of expression, where she works on onlinecensorship.org and her work focuses on platform censorship and accountability, state censorship, the impact of sanctions, and digital security.

She is a founding member of the feminist collective Deep Lab with Addie Wagenknecht. She is the Deputy IFEX Convenor, Sits on the Advisory Council for The Open Technology Fund and the Advisory Board at SMEX.

York has been called "one of the leading scholars on Internet control and censorship" and a specialist on free expression and social media in the Arab world. Her research on the role of social media in the Arab Spring has been widely cited. In June 2011, Foreign Policy named her one of the top 100 intellectuals discussing foreign policy on Twitter.

=== Advocacy ===
York's writing has also been published at Motherboard, BuzzFeed, The Guardian, Bloomberg, Quartz, The Washington Post, and Foreign Policy.

She is a regular columnist for Al Jazeera English and writes for Global Voices Online, where she is also on its board of directors as of 2011. She also co-founded Talk Morocco, which won the 2010 Deutsche Welle Best of Blogs Award for Best English-language blog.

In May 2014, she gave a talk with Jacob Appelbaum suggesting the safer sex and harm reduction movements could show advocates of liberty and privacy how their work can better reach mainstream audiences.

York's commentary and opinions include statements against censorship by corporations and social media organizations at the request of state governments. York and EFF opposed the Philippines Cybercrime Prevention Act of 2012 because of provisions limiting online criticism in favor of a crowd sourced alternative, the Magna Carta for Philippine Internet Freedom which supports free expression and has less stringent limits on free expression online.

=== Women in technology ===
In 2013, when Wired included few women in its first batch of Wired's 101 Signals, a list of best writers and thinkers on the internet, York was among critics who noted the lack of women on the list. York thinks that women are sometimes given less recognition as technology intellectuals because they focus on topics less covered by popular tech magazines while in popular topics men can crowd out popular discourse with active self-promotion.

== Awards ==
- 2010: Deutsche Welle The BOBs (weblog award), Best English Blog, "Talk Morocco"
- 2014: Knight News Challenge, John S. and James L. Knight Foundation, "OnlineCensorship.org"

== Selected publications ==
- "Silicon Values: The Future of Free Speech Under Surveillance Capitalism" (Verso Press, 2021)
- "Information Infrastructure and Social Control: Origins of the Tunisian Internet" (chapter, with Katherine Maher), State Power 2.0: Authoritarian Entrenchment and Political Engagement Worldwide (Ashgate Publishing, 2013)
- "Der abschreckende Effekt von Überwachung" (chapter), "Überwachtes Netz" (NewThinking, 2014)
- "The Internet and Transparency Beyond WikiLeaks" (chapter), "Beyond WikiLeaks: Implications for the Future of Communications, Journalism and Society" (Palgrave Macmillan, 2013)
- "Culture Smart! Morocco: The Essential Guide to Customs & Culture" (Random House, 2006)
