= Mutale Nkonde =

Zambian journalist and artificial intelligence policy researcher

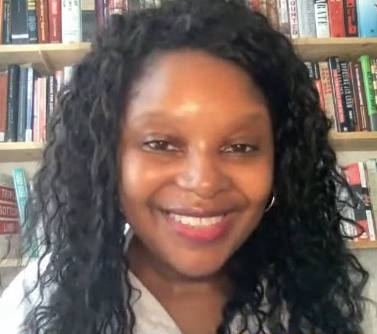
- Nkonde in 2021
- Born: Zambia
- Education: Leeds Metropolitan University; Columbia University
- Occupations: Journalist, AI policy researcher
- Children: 2
- Awards: New York Emmy Award (2021)

Mutale Nkonde is a Zambian journalist and artificial intelligence policy researcher. She founded the nonprofit, AI for the People, aimed at increasing the amount of Black voices in tech and reducing algorithmic bias.

== Early life and education ==
Nkonde was born in Zambia and raised in the United Kingdom. She later lived in Russia, the United Arab Emirates, and Japan. Nkonde studied in the neurology department at Leeds Metropolitan University for three years before completing a B.Sc. with honors in sociology. She earned a M.A. in American studies from the Columbia Graduate School of Arts and Sciences. Nkonde is pursuing a Ph.D. in digital humanities as a Harding distinguished postgraduate scholar at University of Cambridge.

== Career ==
Mutale Nkonde is the founder and chief executive officer of AI for the People, a nonprofit organization that promotes equity in technology and public policy. Before this, she helped introduce the Algorithmic and Deep Fakes Algorithmic Acts, in addition to the No Biometric Barriers to Housing Act, to the U.S. House of Representatives. She is currently a Visiting Policy Fellow at the Oxford Internet Institute. She started working in politics during the Barack Obama 2008 presidential campaign. Nkonde worked as the director of labor of Bill Lynch Associates. She later founded the management consultancy firm, Nkonde & Associates. She has contributed to public discussions on ethical AI governance and algorithmic accountability through nonprofit and policy work.

Following the publication of Weapons of Math Destruction in 2016, Nkonde began researching algorithmic bias. She co-authored the 2019 article, Advancing Racial Literacy in Tech with Jessie Daniels and Darakhshan Mir. Nkonde founded AI for the People, a nonprofit advocating for the reduction of algorithmic bias. It supported the drafting of the "Algorithmic Accountability Act" introduced by Yvette Clarke to the United States House of Representatives in 2019. In 2019, Nkonde became a fellow at both the Harvard Law School Berkman Klein Center of Internet and Society and the civil society lab at Stanford University. In 2021, she won a New York Emmy Award for her storytelling efforts on a news segment covering facial recognition. In 2024, Nkonde supported the development of the AI policy platform of the Congressional Black Caucus.

== Personal life ==
Nkonde and her husband separated in 2010. As of 2014, Nkonde resided in Brooklyn with her two sons.
