= School for Poetic Computation =

Art school in New York City

Coordinates: 40.736589°N 74.009298°W

The School for Poetic Computation (SFPC) is a hybrid of a school, residency and research group that was founded in 2013 in New York City. A small group of students and faculty work closely to explore the intersections of code, art, hardware and theory—focusing especially on artistic intervention, including code poetry. Rather than formal classes, the students at the school focus on personal creative projects. The school's motto is "more poems, less demos."

== History ==
The school was co-founded in 2013 by Zach Lieberman, Taeyoon Choi, Amit Pitaru, and Jen Lowe. In the summer of 2020, amidst discussions about how the administrators had handled issues related to Black Lives Matter, the school paused public programming and began to transition to a collective administrative structure. As part of this transition, co-founders Zach Lieberman and Taeyoon Choi stepped down and members of the former administration published a blog post apologizing for mistakes made and outlining the changes to the administrative structure.

Under the new administrative model, SFPC is now run by the "SFPC Stewards" who are committed to running a "beautiful school" centering BIPOC, disabled, and queer makers. These co-directors are Zainab Aliyu, Todd Anderson, American Artist, Neta Bomani, Melanie Hoff, and Galen Macdonald.

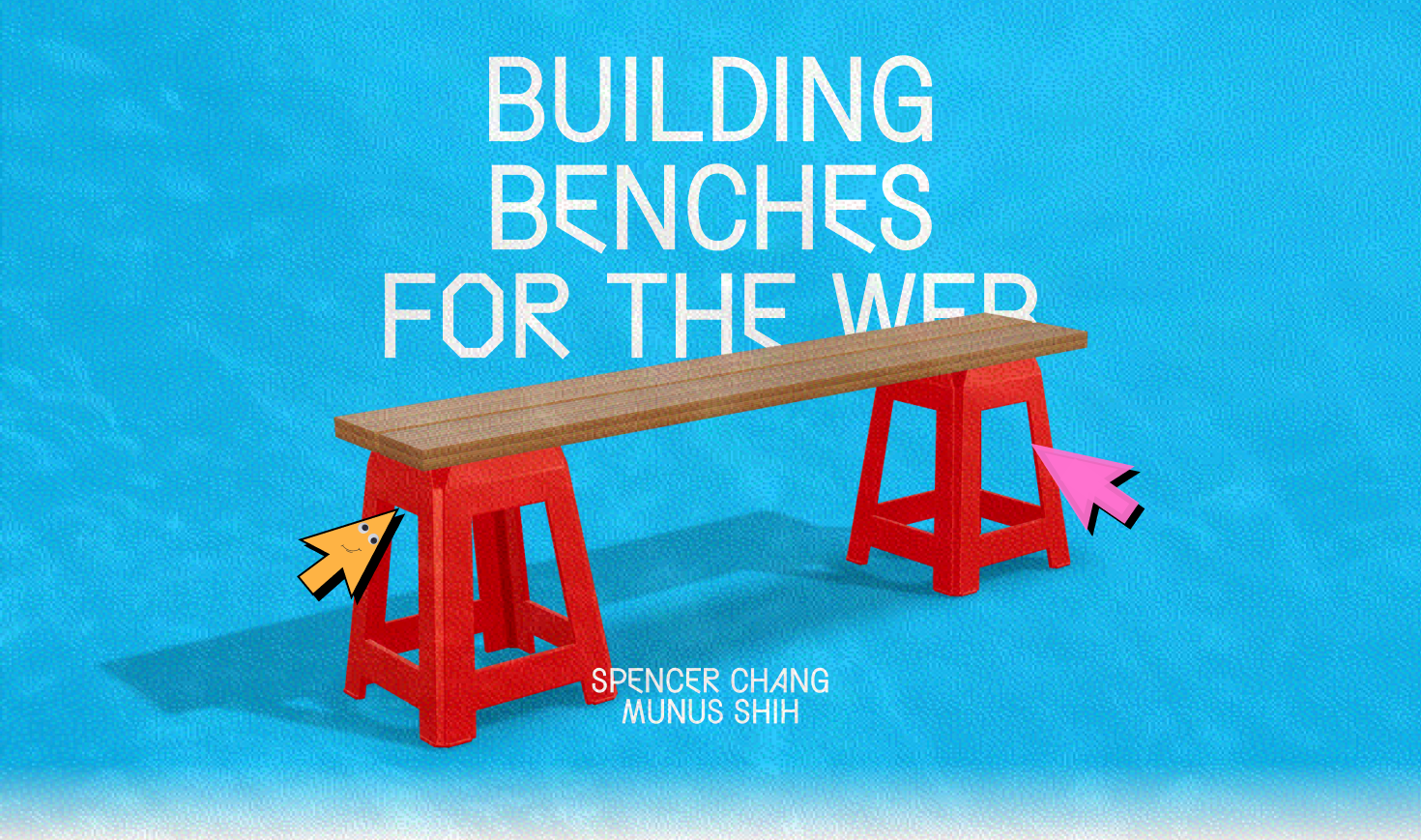
A poster promoting SFPC course "Building Benches for the Web" taught by artists Spencer Chang and Munus Shih.

Since the reorganization, SFPC has run an assortment of classes every season, mostly online and some in-person. Classes are taught by a variety of artists, designers, and educators; and span topics such as solidarity technology, artistic data use, subverting interfaces, nontraditional design philosophies, and playful, expressive internet spaces.

In the summer of 2026, SFPC began a two-month residency with the National Academy of Design to bring to life their vision of "Future Schools" and hosted their first large-scale community party and fundraiser with Poetic Promenade, featuring Stephanie Dinkins, who received an honorary degree, and Kelli Anderson, as the keynote speaker, among other artists.
