= Culture Lab =

UK academic institution

Coordinates: 54.9787°N 1.6142°W

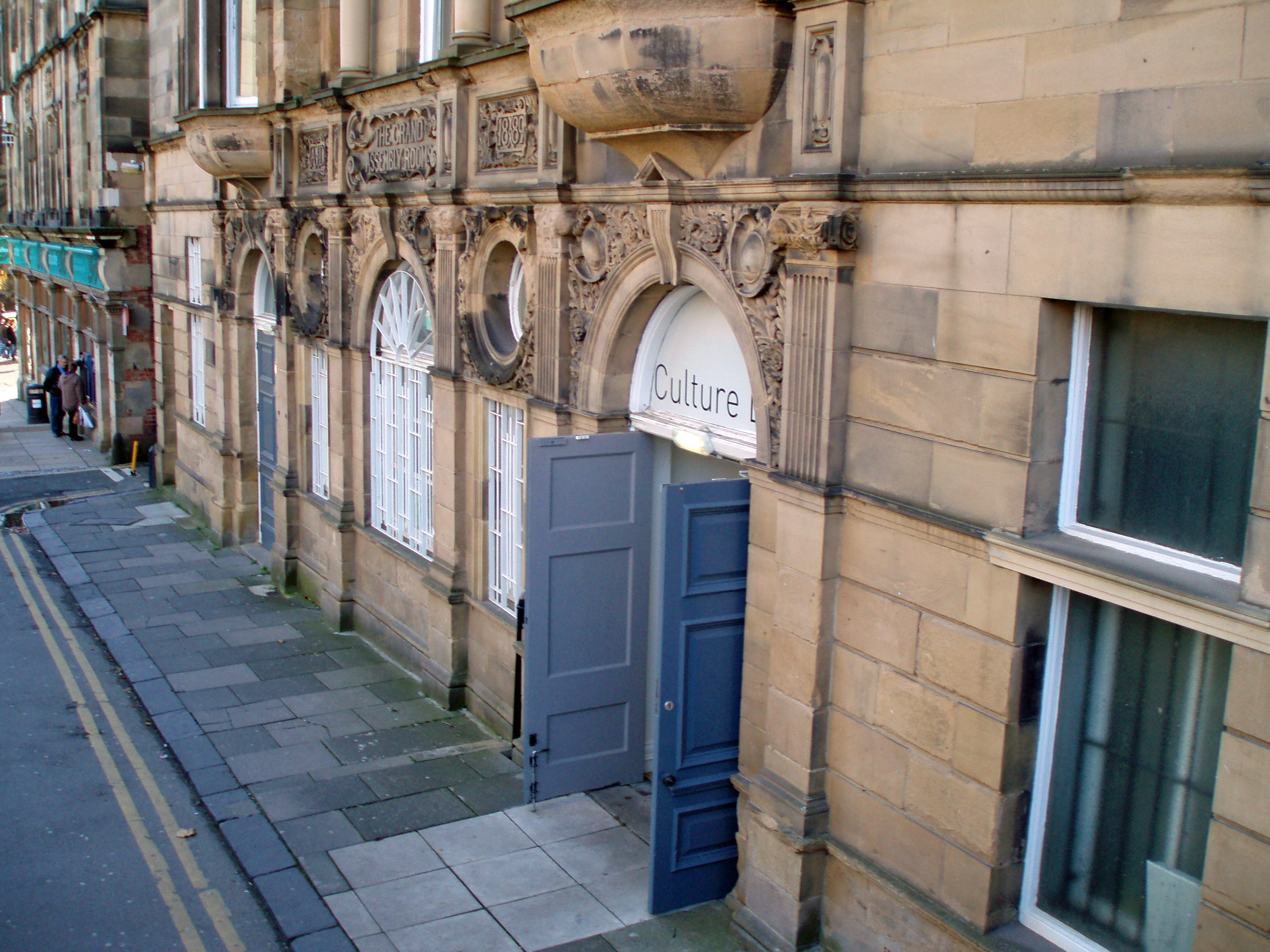
- Established: 2006
- Location: Newcastle upon Tyne, Tyne & Wear, England
- Affiliations: Newcastle University
- Website: www.ncl.ac.uk/culturelab

Culture Lab is an interdisciplinary research facility at Newcastle University, Newcastle upon Tyne, UK.

== History ==
Founded in 2006, Culture Lab provides an environment for academics and practitioners to work beyond traditional disciplinary boundaries, and offers access to specialist digital technologies for a diverse range of creative, practice-led research. Situated in a Grade II listed building (the Grand Assembly Rooms on King's Walk, Newcastle), Culture Lab houses open-plan research areas, and dedicated performance, electronics, workshop, multimedia and sound spaces.

=== The Grand Assembly Rooms ===
The Grand Assembly Rooms is a Grade II listed building and was built in 1889. Prior to being used by the Culture Lab, the building was listed on 4 August 2000 and was then used as the University PE and Fitness Centre.

The building was designed by Lamb and Armstrong of Newcastle and was included as a listed building for being a "good surviving Victorian public building, with particularly fine if eroded stone decoration on its principal façade, and an excellent range of internal fixtures".

== Uses ==
Often working in collaboration with arts organisations, industry partners and other academic institutions, Culture Lab has facilitated conferences on diverse topics, including Music & Machines, Architecture in the Space of Flows, and Artificial Intelligence & Simulation of Behaviour, as well as hosting frequent public performances, installations, lectures, seminars and workshops. The Ballroom can host up to 150 people.

Culture Lab hosts PhD students from diverse institutional, international and disciplinary backgrounds, forming the core of an eclectic research culture. It also hosts projects for Masters and some bachelor's degrees. The Culture Lab is also host to the filmmaking collective Ballroom24, who use The Ballroom to host weekly screenings of international films.

=== Research initiatives ===
Culture Lab initiatives have included the INSCAPE project (funded by the European Commission) to design an interactive storytelling tool; AMUC, a collaborative motion-capture project involving Computing Science, Mechanical Engineering and Performing Arts; and the Ambient Kitchen, providing a platform for exploring assistive technology in the domestic setting.

== See also ==
- David Campbell (academic) - early project manager
