= Mick Ebeling =

American film producer (born 1970)

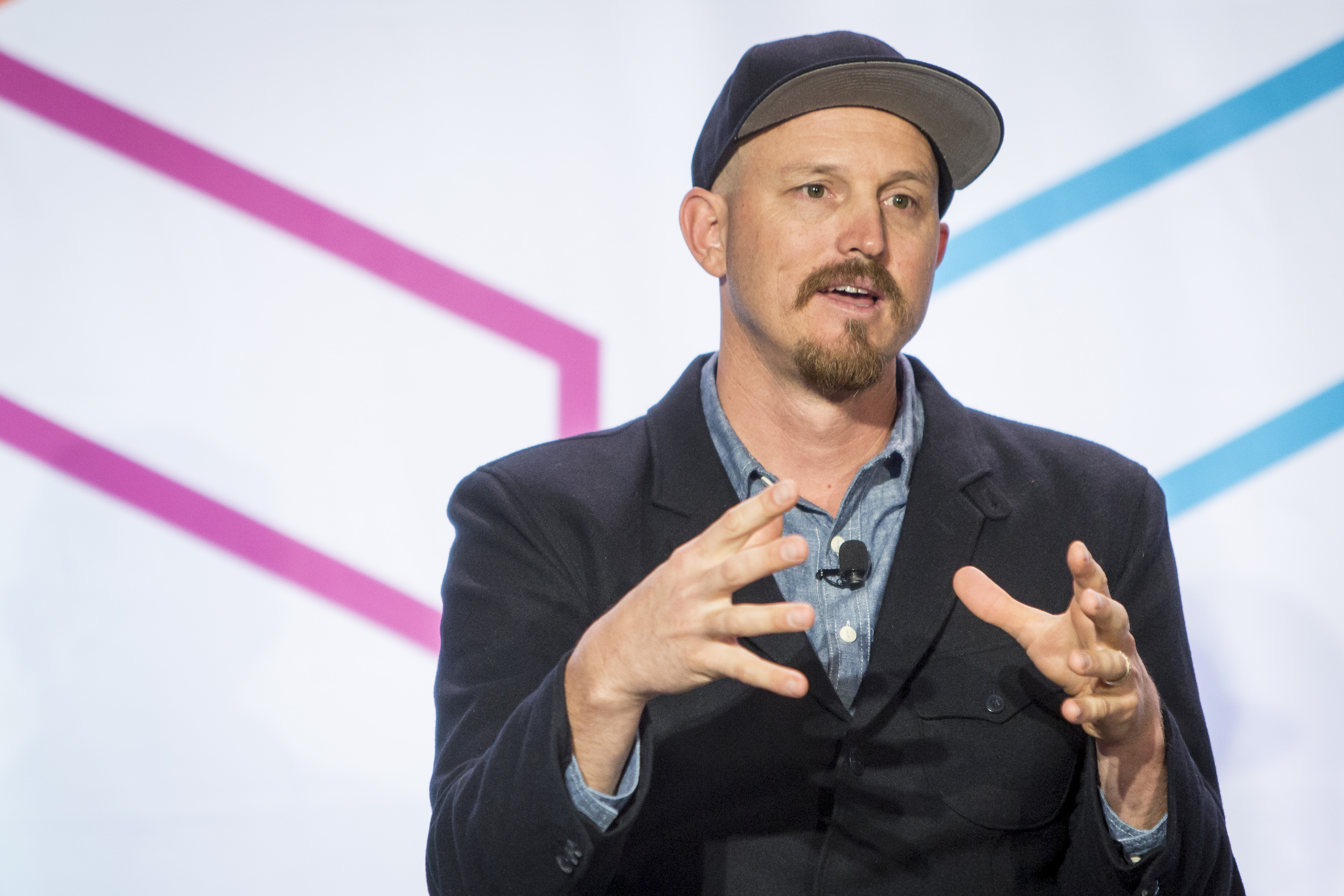
- at Internet Week New York; May 18, 2015
- Born: June 26, 1970 (age 56)
- Education: UC Santa Barbara ('92)
- Occupations: Inventor, social entrepreneur, speaker, philanthropist

Mick Ebeling (born June 26, 1970) is an American innovator, entrepreneur, author, speaker and philanthropist who focuses on developing technology that "benefits humanity".

Ebeling is the founder and CEO of Not Impossible Labs, a social tech incubator whose stated mission is to "create technology for the sake of humanity". Three companies have been spun off from the incubator: Bento, Music:Not Impossible, and Vibrohealth. Ebeling also founded the nonprofit organization The Not Impossible Foundation.

== Early life and education ==
Mick Ebeling is the son of Marge and Les Ebeling. He was born in Long Beach, California, and raised in Phoenix, Arizona, where he attended Brophy College Preparatory. He went on to play basketball for the Air Force Academy, Colorado, before he transferred to University of California, Santa Barbara where he graduated in 1992 with a degree in political science.

== Career ==
Ebeling's first entertainment job was launching Venice Beach-based Fuel in 1995. Fuel was a motion design studio using Adobe After Effects software. Fuel was bought by Razorfish in July 1999. Ebeling went on to be the CEO of They. They was a cross-platform design company that worked with clients such as NASA. In 2001, he formed The Ebeling Group (TEG), a commercial and film production company that focuses on animation, design and visual effects.

From 2006 to 2011, the company worked on the credits on Stranger Than Fiction (2006), Kite Runner (2007), Quantum of Solace (2008), the award-winning animation "Yes, Virginia" television special for CBS (2009) and a series of short films with Marvel Studios called "One-Shots" (2011).

=== Not Impossible Labs ===
Mick Ebeling founded Not Impossible Labs in 2011, a tech incubator and think tank whose philosophy revolves around identifying absurdities and developing solutions designed to end these absurdities with technology. Not Impossible Labs’ first project, and also the impetus for its foundation, was the EyeWriter. In April 2009, Ebeling flew five programmers and hackers from Graffiti Research Lab, Free Art and Technology Lab, and openFrameworks to Los Angeles and in the living room of his home created the EyeWriter, an open source, DIY device which enables individuals with paralysis to communicate and create art using only the movement of their eyes.

The EyeWriter project was conceptualized and first created for Tempt One, a Los Angeles-based graffiti artist who was diagnosed with Amyotrophic lateral sclerosis (ALS) in 2003. Tempt One wrote his first piece of graffiti after seven years using the EyeWriter on April 10, 2009. The device is now part of the permanent collection of New York's Museum of Modern Art (MoMA). Ebeling is also the executive producer of the documentary film Getting Up: The Tempt One Story, winner of the Audience Award at the 2011 Slamdance Film Festival.

Ebeling heard the story of Daniel, a boy from South Sudan who lost both arms during an explosion and, upon waking up, declared that he would rather be dead than not have arms so that he would be less of a burden for his family. Project Daniel was then born and Not Impossible Labs created a 3D-printable prosthetic arm. In November 2013, Ebeling flew to South Sudan. Of the project, Time's tech journalist Harry McCracken wrote, "it's hard to imagine any other device here doing more to make the world a better place."

Additional projects focus on solving problems with technology. With Music: Not Impossible, the team created wearable technology that allows those who are deaf or hard of hearing to experience music through vibrations spread around their body. Hunger: Not Impossible, now called Bento, is a simple text-based technology that connects people experiencing food insecurity to pre-paid meals. The initiative was thought of as a response to the COVID crisis. Ebeling's first book, Not Impossible: The Art and Joy of Doing What Couldn't Be Done, was released by Simon & Schuster on January 6, 2015, and documents his work with Not Impossible Labs, focusing on the EyeWriter and Project Daniel.

== Personal life ==
Ebeling is married to Caskey Ebeling, an American filmmaker and screenwriter; they have three children.

== Nominations ==
- Grammy Award (2009) for Best Short Form Music Video for “Another Way to Die” by Jack White and Alicia Keys
