= EyeWriter =

Assistive technology for creating art

The EyeWriter is a low-cost eye tracking system originally designed for paralyzed graffiti artist Tempt1. The EyeWriter system uses inexpensive cameras and open-source computer vision software to track the wearer's eye movements.

EyeWriter was conceived by Mick Ebeling and developed at Ebeling's home in Venice Beach by artists and engineers from the Free Art & Technology Lab, Graffiti Research Lab and OpenFrameworks teams, including Zachary Lieberman, Evan Roth, James Powderly, Theo Watson and Chris Sugrue.

The project has been recognized with numerous awards including being honored by Time as one of the Top 50 inventions of 2010, the 2010 Prix Ars Electronica, the 2010 FutureEverything Award and featured on NPR and TED.

EyeWriter was featured in 2009 at the CREAM International Festival for Arts & Media in Yokohama. Tempt1 was also featured in 2009 projected on Kyoto City Hall. EyeWriter was part of the Talk to Me exhibit at MoMA on display from July 24 until November 7, 2011.

== Funding ==
The first phase of the project was funded by the Ebeling Group resulting in Tempt1 being able to successfully draw for the first time in seven years using only his eyes. Upon completion of phase one, the development team initiated phase two and received almost $18,000 as a Kickstarter project, which surpassed its $15,000 goal. It also received funding support from the Ebeling Group and from Parsons School of Design.

== Software and development ==
The EyeWriter software consist of eye-tracking software, and a drawing software that allows a user to draw with the movement of their eye. The source code for the EyeWriter software is an open source code with an Artistic/GPL License. The software for both parts has been developed using openframeworks, a cross platform C++ library for creative development. Eyewriter 2.0 led to the development of Livewriter to be used in the 2010 Cinekid festival. In addition to Eyewriter's original parameters, a robot arm was integrated allowing the physical recording of visually created content.

PrintBall, a paintball shooting robot, was developed by Benjamin Gaulon in Dublin.
