= Eyebeam (organization) =

U.S. non-profit organization

Coordinates: 40°44′49.58″N 74°0′25.64″W

- Formation: 1998; 28 years ago
- Type: Non-profit
- Headquarters: 199 Cook St., Suite 104, Brooklyn, NY 11222
- Executive director: Julia Kaganskiy
- Website: www.eyebeam.org

Eyebeam is a not-for-profit art and technology center in New York City, founded by John Seward Johnson III with co-founders David S. Johnson and Roderic R. Richardson.

Originally conceived as a digital effects and coding atelier and center for youth education, Eyebeam has become a center for the research, development, and curation of new media works of art and open-source technology. Eyebeam annually hosts up to 20 residents and co-produces youth educational programs, exhibitions, performances, symposiums, workshops, hackathons and other events with these residents as well as with partner organizations. Projects developed at Eyebeam have received awards and recognition including Webby Awards, Guggenheim Fellowships, and the Prix Ars Electronica.

== History ==
Eyebeam, originally called Eyebeam Atelier, was first conceived as a collaboration between David S. Johnson, a digital artist, and John Seward Johnson III, a filmmaker and philanthropist. The two were introduced by Roderic R. Richardson, a mutual friend who recognized their shared interests and helped establish the new venture in its early stages. The inspiration to name the project Eyebeam Atelier came partly from the sculpture atelier of John Johnson's father, John Seward Johnson II and the Experiments in Art and Technology collective, although David Johnson had also used the name Eyebeam Simulations for a start-up location-based virtual reality (VR) entertainment concept before meeting Roderic or John Johnson. After observing new media as a growing genre, the co-founders were motivated to create a similar studio. They recognized a need to provide artists and digital film artists access to new technology and a shared workspace.

In addition to offering resources for new media artists, Johnson saw a need to provide middle and high school students with educational and artistic opportunities. Digital Day Camp, the first youth program which catered to new media education, was founded in 1998; in the pilot program, New York-based high school students learned web development and design. Future sessions included project-based learning around themes of bioart, urban interventionism, game design, and wearable technology.

Eyebeam's first forum, "Interaction," was an email list called <eyebeam><blast> that was online in the spring of 1998. It was curated by University of California, San Diego (UCSD) professor Jordan Crandall to continue conversations about practicing art in the emerging internet. Contributors to the forum included Bracha Lichtenberg Ettinger, Ken Goldberg, N. Katherine Hayles, Brian Holmes, Lev Manovich, Hans-Ulrich Obrist, Olu Oguibe, Saskia Sassen, Matthew Slotover, Gregory Ulmer, Critical Art Ensemble, and Knowbotic Research. Conversations from this forum were compiled into a 2001 book titled Interaction: Artistic Practice on the Network.

In addition to funding artistic research, Johnson hoped to develop Eyebeam as a space that would also function as a museum devoted to new media works. In 2000, Eyebeam announced an international architectural competition to construct a space devoted to the dialog between art and technology, with the design firm Diller + Scofidio's "Olympic class" design named the winner of the competition.

Eyebeam held its first open studios for artists in residence and fellows in 2002. Alexander R. Galloway, G. H. Hovagimyan, Tony Martin, Yael Kanarek, M.River & T.Whid Art Associates (MTAA), John Klima, Jem Cohen, Cory Arcangel, and Michael Bell-Smith were among the inaugural exhibitors. Among the projects on display was Galloway's Carnivore, a Processing library that allowed for the creative misuse of data surveillance created in tandem with other members of Radical Software Group. Carnivore takes its name and function from DCS1000, a surveillance system used by the United States Federal Bureau of Investigation. Carnivore was awarded the Prix Ars Electronica Golden Nica the same year.

Residents Yury Gitman and Carlos Gomez de Llarena's Noderunner, a scavenger hunt based on Wi-Fi sharing, received the 2003 Prix Ars Electronica Golden Nica. Fundrace.org, a site which allows visitors to track campaign contributions through geocoding, was developed by Jonah Peretti, then-director of Research and Development at Eyebeam, and later adapted into a permanent feature on the Huffington Post. Peretti, together with Alexander Galloway, collaborated on ReBlog, one of the first blogging platform which allows users to filter and publish content from many RSS feeds. Beginning in 2005, the Eyebeam ReBlog began to feature the Eyebeam Journal, a series of in-depth writings and interviews with resident artists, research fellows, and guest contributors. During their R&D Fellowships, Theo Watson and Zachary Lieberman continued to develop openFrameworks, a C and C++ library originally created at Parsons. Together with Processing, openFrameworks became one of the most popular platforms for creative coding.

The Eyebeam OpenLab served as the birthplace of the Graffiti Research Lab. Founded by James Powderly and Evan Roth during their OpenLab fellowships in 2005, the GRL was envisioned as a nonprofit design studio for creating experimental technologies with street art applications. While at Eyebeam, Powderly and Roth developed a method for creating graffiti messages in individual LED lights and a system for projecting shapes drawn with a handheld laser in real time. Powderly and Roth later founded the F.A.T. (Free Art and Technology) Lab, a collective dedicated to the merging of open source technology and popular culture, with Theo Watson, Chris Sugrue, and others.

Eyebeam expanded its programmatic lineup of exhibitions and workshops with MIXER, a series dedicated to showcasing leading performance artists in the field of live video and audio, conceived and curated by Paul Amitai starting in late 2007. The inaugural event, "Brother Islands (Places to Lose People)", was focused around an immersive experimental documentary of North Brother Island and Wards Island by media artist Benton C Bainbridge. MIXER evolved into immersive, interactive art events organized around themes as disparate as the World's Fair, the 2010 Winter Olympics, and New York City's underground and featured interactive installations alongside performances by musicians and performance artists including Dam-Funk (DāM-FunK), Extreme Animals, CHERYL, and D-Fuse AV. That same year, fellows and resident artists began organizing mobile workshops and talks. In 2011, several Eyebeam residents, fellows, and alumni participated in Talk to Me: Design and the Communication between People and Objects at the Museum of Modern Art (MoMA) in New York City. Eyebeam Fellow Ayah Bdeir's littleBits, a DIY kit of open source pre-assembled circuits, was among the projects displayed and was acquired by the MoMA as part of their permanent collection.

In February 2014 the first ever Art + Feminism Wikipedia Edit-A-Thon was co-organized by fellow Laurel Ptak and hosted at Eyebeam and the Brooklyn Museum. That same year, Eyebeam hosted an exhibition entitled "New Romantics", which looked at the influence of Romanticism in digital art.

In November 2017 Eyebeam moved to 199 Cook Street in Brooklyn. This coincided with their 20th anniversary as an organization which was celebrated in spring 2018. That same year the organization launched the Eyebeam Center for the Future of Journalism, helmed by Marisa Mazria Katz. The program is an experimental grant-making program that supports artists and artist-journalist teams producing journalistic work for major news organizations. Several of the pieces supported were featured in publications such as The New Yorker, The Guardian, Wired, The Atlantic and BuzzFeed News. Some went on to win awards, including a Pulitzer Prize, an Emmy, New York Press Club Award, and a SXSW Film Festival 2021 Special Jury Recognition for Immersive Journalism.

== Directors ==
- John Seward Johnson III: 1997–2004
- Steven Tremble: 2004–2005
- Amanda McDonald Crowley: 2005–2011
- Patricia C. Jones: 2011–2015
- Roddy Schrock: 2015–2025
- Sheetal Prajapati: 2025–2026
- Julia Kaganskiy: 2026–Present

== See also ==
- Ars Electronica Center
- Center for Art and Media
- EyeWriter
- Free Art and Technology Lab (aka "FAT Lab")
- Graffiti Research Lab
- Kitchen Budapest
- openFrameworks
- V2 Institute for the Unstable Media
