= James Powderly =

American artist

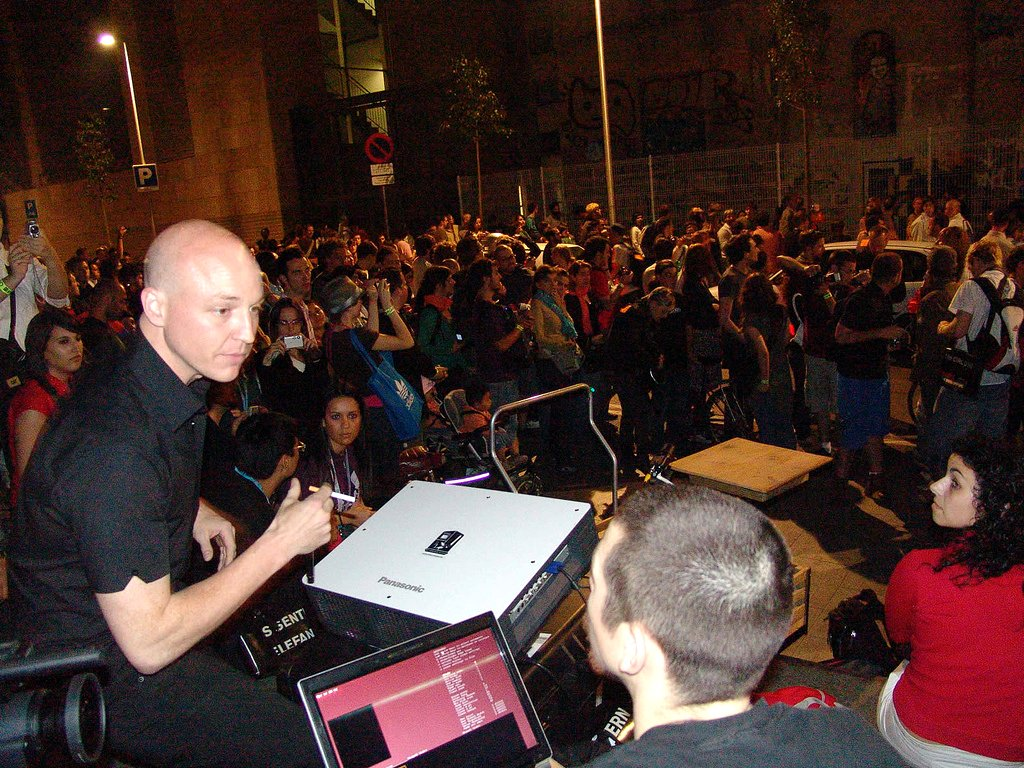
- Born: 1976 (age 49–50); Chattanooga, Tennessee, United States
- Education: New York University, Interactive Telecommunications Program
- Known for: Street Art, Robotics, and Internet Art
- Notable work: L.A.S.E.R. Tag, LED Throwies
- Awards: 2010 Japan New Media Art Festival Excellence Prize, 2010 Ars Electronica Golden Nica in Interactive Art, 2010 Design Museum Brit Insurance Design of the Year in Interactive Art, 2010 Future Everything Award, 2006–2007 Eyebeam OpenLab Senior Fellowship, 2006 Ars Electronica Award of Distinction, 2006, Lower Manhattan Cultural Council, Off the Record Commission, 2005–2006 Eyebeam OpenLab Fellowship, 2005 Eyebeam Artist in Residence

James Powderly (born 1976 in Chattanooga, Tennessee) is an American artist, designer and engineer whose work has focused on creating tools for graffiti artists and political activists, designing robots and augmented reality platforms, and promoting open source culture.

== Biography ==
Powderly studied music composition at the University of Tennessee at Chattanooga. After college, he received a master's degree from New York University's Interactive Telecommunications Program. James worked at Honeybee Robotics and was part of the team that worked on the Mars Exploration Rovers Rock Abrasion Tool. As the collaborative team Robot Clothes, Powderly and artist Michelle Kempner, received an artist residency at Eyebeam for its project, Automated Biography. The project used small robots to tell the "personal story about a sick person and their partner".

In 2005, Powderly became a Research and Development Fellow at Eyebeam where he began collaborating with Evan Roth. Working as the Graffiti Research Lab, Roth and Powderly developed open source tools for graffiti writers and activists, such as LED Throwies and L.A.S.E.R. Tag. Together, they also founded the Free Art and Technology Lab (F.A.T. Lab). Most recently, Powderly has won awards for his work on the EyeWriter project, including the 2009 Design of the Year in Interactive Art from the Design Museum, London, the 2010 Prix Ars Electronica, the 2010 FutureEverything Award and featured on NPR and TED.

== Exhibitions ==
Selected exhibitions, screenings and performances include:

- 2004 ArtBots, Harlem, New York
- 2005 Eyebeam with Michelle Kempner, New York
- 2006 Ars Electronica, Goodbye Privacy, Linz, Austria
- 2007 Sundance Film Festival, New Frontiers, Park City, Utah
- 2007 2nd Digital Arts Festival, OpenPlay, Taipei City, Taiwan
- 2007 Microwave Festival, Luminous Echo, Hong Kong
- 2007 Ars Electronica, Second City, Linz, Austria
- 2007 Esther M Klein Gallery, "Artbots", Philadelphia, Pennsylvania
- 2007 Eyebeam, Open City, New York City, New York
- 2008 Elizabeth Foundation for the Arts, Beyond a Memorable Fancy, New York City
- 2008 Museum of Modern Art, Rough Cut: Design Takes a Sharp Edge, New York City
- 2008 Museum of Modern Art, Design and the Elastic Mind, New York City
- 2008 Tate Modern, Street Art, London, UK
- 2009 Platoon Kunsthalle, Showcase, Seoul, South Korea
- 2009 Street Art Dealer Interactive Exhibition, Bristol, UK
- 2010 Design Museum, Brit. Insurance Design of the Year 2010, London, UK
- 2011 Museum of Modern Art, Talk to Me, New York City
- 2012 Ljudmila, "The Lickers", Ljubljana, Slovenia, 2012
- 2013 Eyebeam, FAT GOLD, New York, NY

== Detention in China ==
In June 2008, before the 2008 Summer Olympics, Powderly was contacted by Students for a Free Tibet who wanted to use his laser stencil invention, which can laser project simple stencils up to 2 km away, to project the words "Free Tibet" on a Beijing landmark, without acquiring any permission from the local authority. He said, "My understanding of the Tibetan issue was not in depth," but that he wanted to make "a general statement about freedom of speech". After practicing his message projection out of an apartment, he and two other protesters were arrested, interrogated, and detained at Chongwen Detention Center and given 10 days for "disrupting public order", which is unusual for American activists detained in China. He was released on the closing day of the Olympics, on August 24.

== See also ==
- Graffiti Research Lab
