= Evan Roth =

American artist

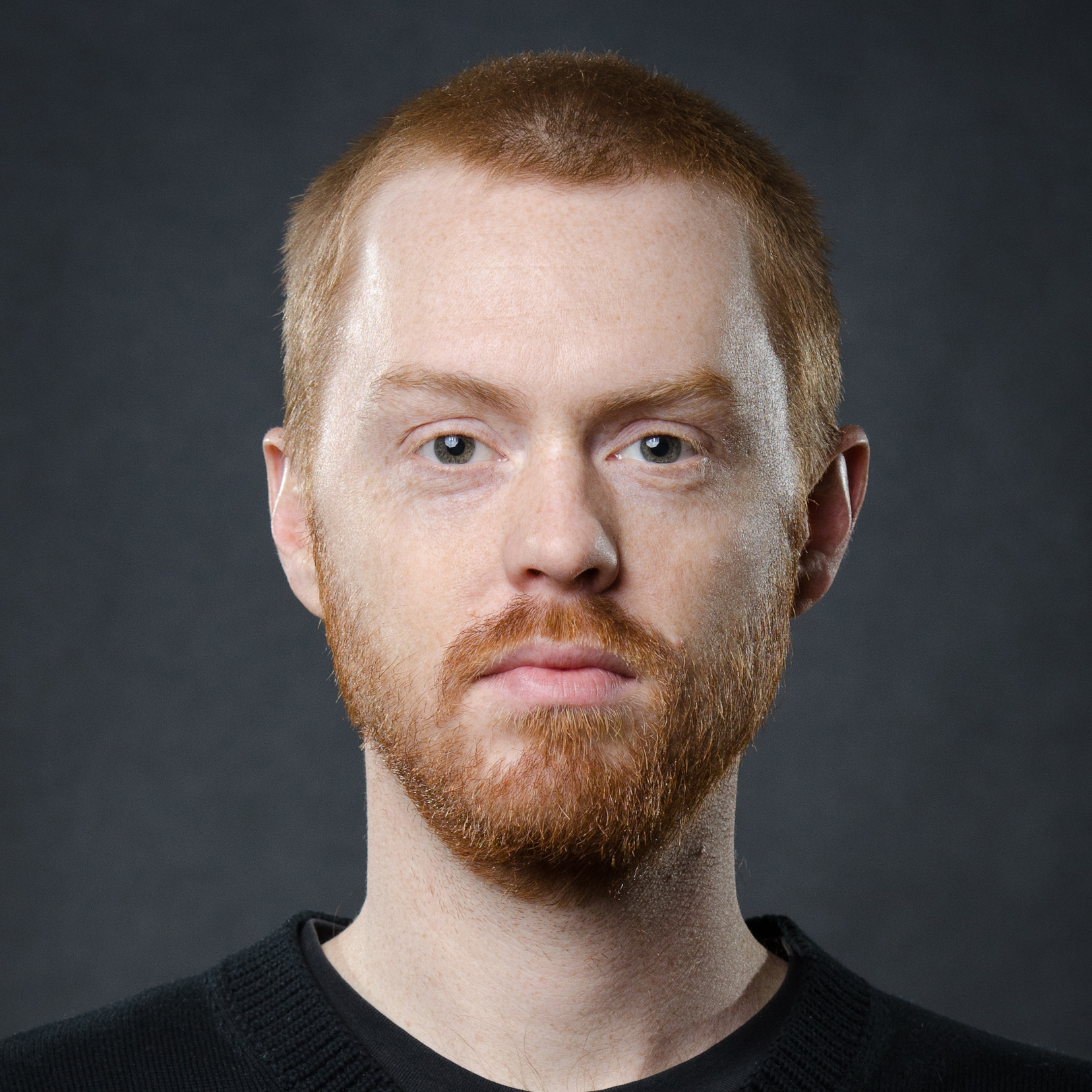
- Born: March 5, 1978 (age 48); Okemos, Michigan
- Education: University of Maryland and Parsons School of Design
- Known for: Interactive art, programming, generative art, LED throwies, digital art, net art
- Notable work: Graffiti Research Lab, Free Art and Technology Lab, EyeWriter

Evan Roth (born 1978) is an American artist who applies a hacker philosophy to an art practice that visualizes transient moments in public space, online and in popular culture.

== Biography ==
Evan Roth received a degree in architecture from University of Maryland and a MFA from the Communication, Design and Technology school at Parsons The New School for Design, where he graduated as class valedictorian. During his time at Parsons, he developed several projects, including Graffiti Taxonomy, Typographic Illustration, Explicit Content Only and Graffiti Analysis, his thesis project. Roth was named one of the ten most interesting recent graduates of 2006.

After graduating Roth worked at the Eyebeam OpenLab, an open source creative technology lab for the public domain as a Research and Development Fellow from 2005–2006 and a Senior Fellow from 2006-2007. Roth's work with graffiti, open source technology and public space led to him forming the Graffiti Research Lab ("GRL") with James Powderly in 2005. GRL projects include LED throwies and L.A.S.E.R. Tag. In 2007, Roth co-founded the Free Art and Technology Lab (F.A.T. Lab), an Internet-based art-and-technology collective dedicated to the intersection of open-source hacking and popular culture. He has worked under the pseudonym fi5e.

Roth and Ben Engebreth were awarded a 2007 Rhizome Commission for White Glove Tracking, which was presented at the Contemporary New Museum in New York City. Roth was again awarded a Rhizome Commission in 2008 for his project "T.S.A. Communications".

Several of Roth's work are in the permanent collection of the Museum of Modern Art. Roth currently lives in Berlin with his wife.

In 2012, he was awarded a Smithsonian Cooper-Hewitt National Design Award.

Roth's Internet Cache Self Portrait series uses images automatically stored in his computer's browser cache to create large-scale visual compositions. The works incorporate thousands of images encountered during everyday internet use, including website graphics, advertisements and maps. Roth described the resulting compositions as portraits of both his online activity and the changing internet. A work from the series was exhibited in Electronic Superhighway (2016–1966) at the Whitechapel Gallery in London.

== Exhibitions ==
Selected exhibitions, screenings and performances include:

- 2004, The Cracow Film Festival, Cracow, Poland
- 2005, Typsonic, Ingolstadt, Germany
- 2005, Tokyo Type Directors Club Tokyo, Tokyo, Japan (Curated by John Maeda)
- 2006, Ars Electronica, Goodbye Privacy, Linz, Austria
- 2007, Eyebeam, Open City, New York City, New York
- 2007, Ars Electronica, Second City, Linz, Austria
- 2007, IEEE, Infovis Art Show, Sacramento, California
- 2007, Microwave Festival, Luminous Echo, Hong Kong
- 2007, 2nd Digital Arts Festival, OpenPlay, Taipei City, Taiwan
- 2007, Sundance Film Festival, New Frontiers, Park City, Utah
- 2008, Museum of Modern Art, Design and the Elastic Mind, New York City, New York
- 2008, Videotage, Secondlife, Hong Kong
- 2008, Elizabeth Foundation for the Arts, Beyond a Memorable Fancy, New York City, New York
- 2008, Netherlands Media Art Institute, Speaking Out Loud, Amsterdam, Netherlands
- 2008, Tate Modern, Street Art, London, UK
- 2008, Thailand Creative & Design Center, Perishable Beauty Exhibition, Bangkok, Thailand
- 2008, Museum of Modern Art, Rough Cut: Design Takes a Sharp Edge, New York City, New York
- 2009, Filmwinter, Festival For Expanded Media, Stuttgart, Germany
- 2009, AVAILABLE ONLINE FOR FREE, Solo exhibition, Vienna, Austria
- 2009, Kurzfilmtage, 55th International Short Film Festival, Oberhausen, Germany
- 2009, Fondation Cartier, Born In The Streets - Graffiti, Paris, France
- 2010, British Design Museum, Brit. Insurance Design of the Year 2010, London, UK
- 2011, Kitsch Digital: Tres décadas de interferencias en la web, Can Felipa. Barcelona, España. Curator Helena Acosta
