= L.A.S.E.R. Tag =

Interactive new media art installation using lasers and projection

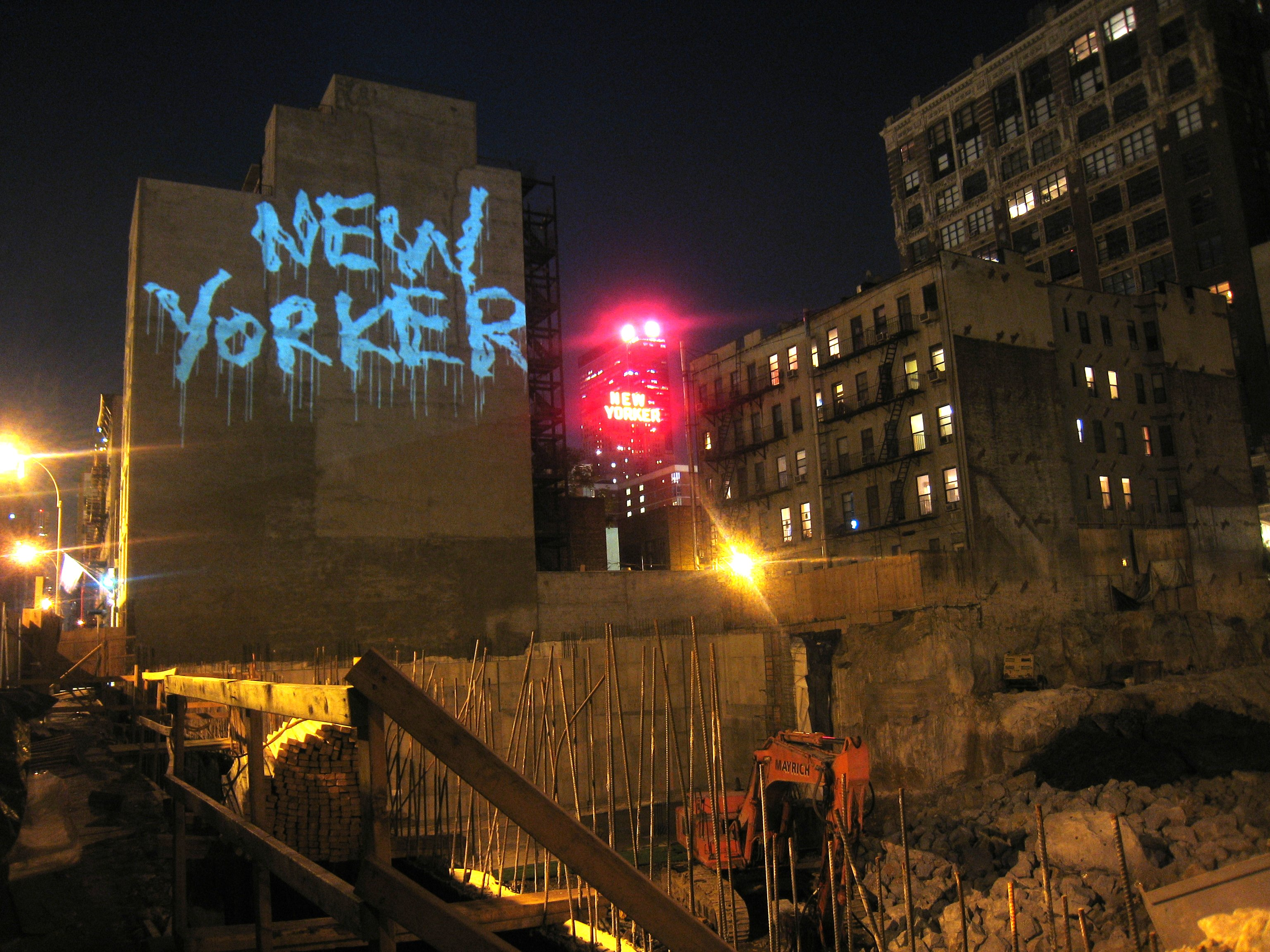
- L.A.S.E.R. Tag projected onto a building in Hell's Kitchen, New York City, June 2007
- Artist: Graffiti Research Lab (Evan Roth, James Powderly, Theodore Watson)
- Year: 2007
- Type: New media art, interactive art, projection mapping
- Medium: Laser pointer, computer vision software, high-lumen projector
- Dimensions: Site-specific (variable)
- Website: graffitiresearchlab.com/blog/projects/laser-tag/

L.A.S.E.R. Tag is an open-source new media art system created by the Graffiti Research Lab (GRL) that allows users to draw on building facades with a laser pointer; the marks are tracked by computer vision software and projected back onto the structure at a large scale. Evan Roth and James Powderly developed the hardware setup while Theodore Watson wrote the software, all three working as fellows at Eyebeam OpenLab in New York City. It debuted publicly in Rotterdam in February 2007 and went on to be exhibited at the Museum of Modern Art (MoMA) and Tate Modern, among other venues.

== Description ==
A camera captures the position of a green laser pointer as a user aims it at a building. Custom software translates that movement into graphics, which a high-lumen projector throws back onto the same surface - so that a person standing on the street can, in effect, scrawl across an entire facade. GRL billed the system a "free-speech machine." Powderly told TIME that the group wanted "to find ways of helping people say things," and Gizmodo labelled it a "Weapon of Mass Defacement."

Because the projections are made of light rather than paint or ink, they leave no physical mark and vanish the moment the projector is switched off. This places L.A.S.E.R. Tag in a legal grey area: it may avoid vandalism charges in some jurisdictions, though the question has not been definitively tested in court.

== Technical details ==
The tracking hardware is relatively simple - a 60 mW green laser pointer and a camera feeding a computer running custom GNU/open-source software. Watson wrote the original application in C++ on top of openFrameworks, a creative-coding library he co-created with Zachary Lieberman. A later rewrite, dubbed Laser Tag 2.0, was a joint effort by Watson and Lieberman, again using openFrameworks.

GRL released the source code for non-commercial use and posted build instructions on Instructables, consistent with their practice of making all tools publicly available. The source code is hosted on GitHub. As of 2026, the original C++ application has been updated to compile on modern systems, and a browser-based port using OpenCV.js and WebGL has been developed, allowing the system to run entirely in a web browser without requiring a native installation.

== History ==
=== Origins ===
Roth and Powderly founded the Graffiti Research Lab in 2005 as Eyebeam OpenLab fellows. L.A.S.E.R. Tag grew out of a series of GRL projects exploring what could happen when graffiti culture met open-source software and cheap hardware.

=== Rotterdam debut (2007) ===
The system's first large-scale outing was in Rotterdam from February 7 to 10, 2007. GRL used the KPN building - roughly 140 feet (43 metres) tall - as a projection surface, and graffiti writers from across Europe came to try the system. A video Powderly uploaded to YouTube on February 20 spread quickly; Engadget picked it up the same day.

=== Ars Electronica and Hong Kong (2007) ===
L.A.S.E.R. Tag was shown at Ars Electronica in Linz, Austria, in September 2007, and two months later it was deployed along the harbour fronts of Kowloon and Hong Kong Island.

== Exhibition history ==
=== Design and the Elastic Mind, MoMA (2008) ===
L.A.S.E.R. Tag was included in Design and the Elastic Mind at the Museum of Modern Art (February 24 - May 12, 2008), an exhibition curated by Paola Antonelli that examined overlaps between design and science. GRL ran a live demonstration at the opening-night reception.

=== Street Art, Tate Modern (2008) ===
At Tate Modern's Street Art exhibition (May 23 - August 25, 2008), GRL took part in an interactive evening on May 25-26, projecting graffiti light works onto the museum's facade.

=== Other venues ===
The system has also been set up at the Colosseum in Rome, on the Brooklyn Bridge, near the Sundance Film Festival in Utah, and at sites across Italy and Hong Kong.

== Cultural impact ==
S. James Snyder, writing in TIME in 2008, noted that museum curators viewed L.A.S.E.R. Tag and related GRL work as sitting at "a convergence of street art, graffiti art and urban cinema." Its showing at both MoMA and Tate Modern was part of a broader wave of institutional attention to street art and technology-mediated public art in the late 2000s.

The decision to open-source the software and hardware instructions had a multiplier effect. VICE credited GRL with helping launch what it called the "open source graffiti movement," and independent "splinter cells" using GRL's tools appeared in Amsterdam, Vienna, Barcelona, Toronto, Tijuana, Hong Kong, Taipei, Minneapolis, and parts of Australia. PBS later documented a growing scene of "projection artists" who use similar techniques to address social and political issues, a practice often traced back in part to GRL's early experiments.

== Legacy ==
After L.A.S.E.R. Tag, several GRL members - including Roth - went on to co-found the Free Art and Technology Lab (F.A.T. Lab), which continued working at the intersection of open-source technology, art, and popular culture.

== See also ==
- Graffiti Research Lab
- Evan Roth
- Projection mapping
- openFrameworks
- Free Art and Technology Lab
- Tactical media
- Street art
- Light art
