= Claudia Peña Salinas =

- Born: 1975 (age 50–51); Montemorelos, Nuevo León
- Education: Art Institute of Chicago, BA, 1999; Hunter College, MFA, 2009
- Known for: Art

Claudia Peña Salinas (1975) is a mixed media artist specializing in sculpture, painting, photography, and installation.

== Biography ==
Salinas was born in Montemorelos, Nuevo León, Mexico, and is now a resident of Brooklyn, New York. Her work draws inspiration from indigenous perspectives and worldviews, with a focus on raising awareness of the shared cultural memory of the Americas.

Salinas earned a Bachelor of Fine Art from the Art Institute of Chicago (1999) and a Master of Fine Arts from Hunter College in New York (2009). She also studied abroad at the Frank Mohr Institute in Groningen, Netherlands, and did an independent study at the New York Studio Program (AICAD) in New York. Salinas also completed residencies at the Contemporary Artist Center at North Adams, Massachusetts in 2005; SOMA in Mexico City in 2011; and the Process Space at Governors Island, New York in 2016.

In 2021 Salinas received a MacDowell Fellowship.

== Art ==
The exhibition "Anaranja" at Forever & Today in New York City in 2012 marked the beginning of this artist's exhibition record. Notably, she recently participated in the "Nada Art Fair New York 2023" at 548 West in New York City. Over the past 11 years, Peña Salinas has presented her works in at least 7 solo shows and 25 group shows. Her art has also graced renowned institutions such as Centre Pompidou in Paris and the Whitney Museum of American Art in New York City. It was also featured at the US Open (tennis) in 2024. Salinas holds a global ranking within the Top 10,000 artists worldwide and is recognized among the Top 100 artists in Mexico. Salinas is a recipient of the Jacob K. Javits Fellowship (2007) and the Sistema Nacional de Creadores de Arte Award (2020).

Solo Exhibitions include Atlpan, The Club, Tokyo, Japan, 2019; Field Station, MSU BROAD Museum, Lansing, MI, 2018; Tlalotlicuetlan, Embajada, San Juan, PR, 2017; and Birdie, GoldRush Fine Art, Skowhegan, ME, 2012. Group Exhibitions include Aimless, Confronting Imago Mundi, Es Baluard Museu d’Art Modern, Palma de Mallorca, Spain, 2023; Breaking Water, Cincinnati Contemporary Arts Center (CAC), Cincinnati, OH, United States, 2022; Forward Ground, Fridman Gallery, New York City, NY, United States, 2022; and Hearts and Minds, Carriage Trade, New York City, NY, United States, 2021
