= Liz LaManche =

American installation artist

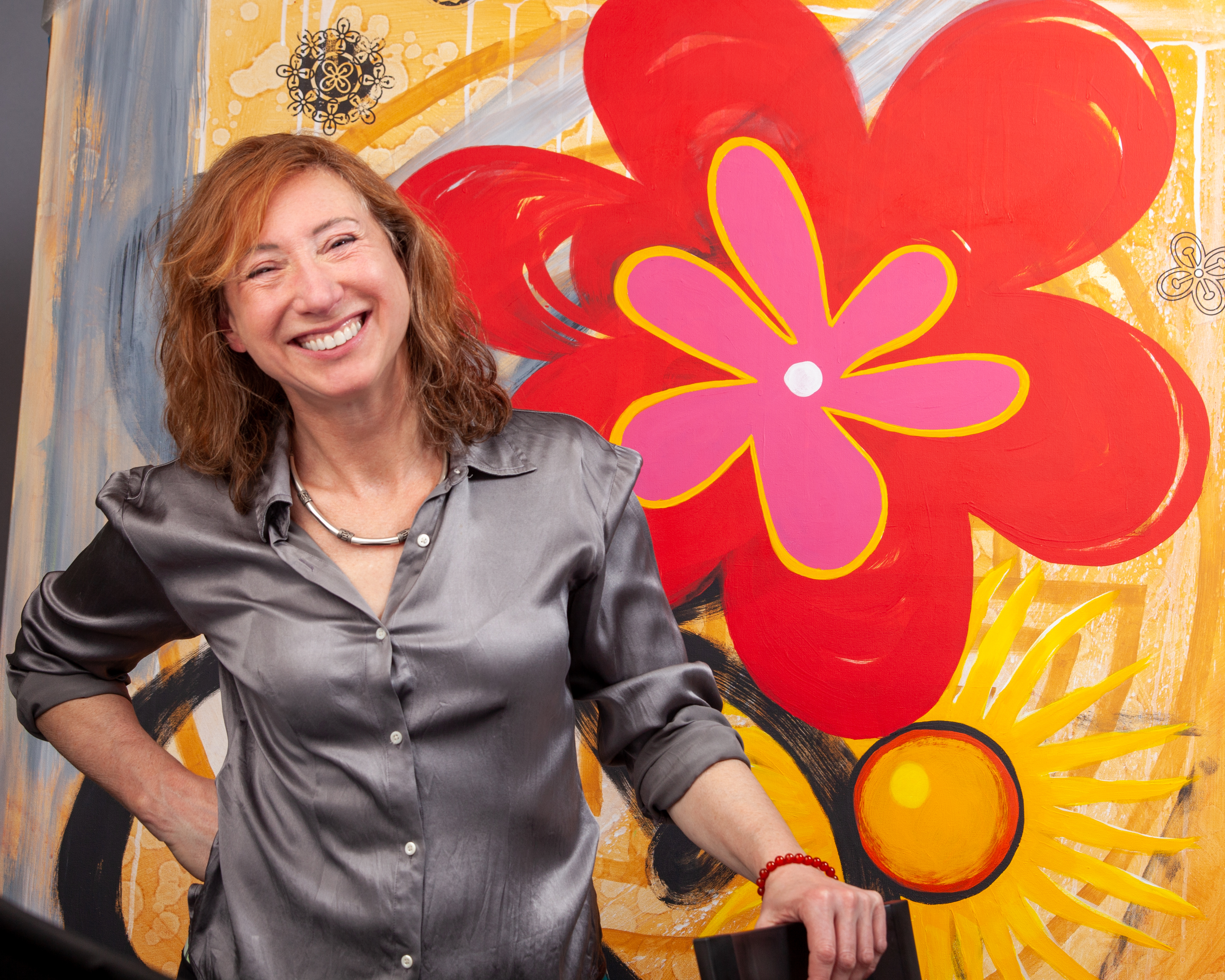
- Liz LaManche with one of her paintings, ~2022
- Born: Elizabeth Manicatide; 1967 (age 58–59)
- Education: Yale University
- Known for: Public Art; Street art Graphic Design
- Website: earthsign.com

Liz LaManche (born Elizabeth Manicatide 1967) is an American artist based in Somerville, Massachusetts, known for creating large-scale public installations and street art in the Boston and Washington, DC, areas.

== Education ==
LaManche received a B.A. in Architecture from Yale University, where she studied graphic design under Inge Druckrey, and completed a thesis project in architectural ornament and site-specific urban installations advised by sculptor Kent Bloomer.

== Career ==
=== Early ===
LaManche spent her early professional career in software user interface design, web development and graphic design, painting in her spare time.

=== Festival Art ===
At Burning Man in 2005, LaManche began to experiment with large-scale murals illuminated with programmed color-changing LED lighting, later known as "art for kinetic light". These murals and their successors were some of the first experiments in this genre of LED art as architectural LED lighting first became available to makers and artists. LaManche's murals appeared for several years at the Burning Man festival in Black Rock City, NV, and at the Boston and New York Decompression events.

=== Art in Public Spaces ===
The "bright color, fanciful characters" and "playful figures" of LaManche's festival work and its layered use of symbolic & iconographic details" proved a crowd-pleasing combination, and commissioned work for large-scale murals and installations in the Boston and Washington D.C. areas followed. Her work in Hyattsville, Maryland achieved national notice for both its innovative use of LED technology and its role in that city's urban renewal, launching opportunities for local projects in her home state.

A goal of Lamanche's work is to humanize the urban environment, the legacy of her architectural training. In a 2016 interview, LaManche stated: "I'd like to provide ways for people to engage with each other and break down barriers, contributing to greater understanding, peace and justice in our society. Literally, I believe we need this to be sustainable as a species". She thereby aims to "create a more inclusive, progressive vision of human society".

== Works ==
=== Public Commissions ===
==== "After Dark, Hyattsville" (2011) ====
A 40x14-foot mural for kinetic light on the Franklin's Brewery building, facing Route 1 in Hyattsville, Maryland, part of the designated Arts District. ""After Dark" has been described as the first permanent outdoor mural for kinetic light. The piece features colorful characters and dreamlike imagery alluding to aspects of the neighborhood, including the local college's mascot and a humorous reference to another piece of public art in a nearby park. Programmed light shows projected on the piece via architectural lighting are designed to make the colors in the painting appear to swap and move.

==== "Stairs of Fabulousness" (2014) ====
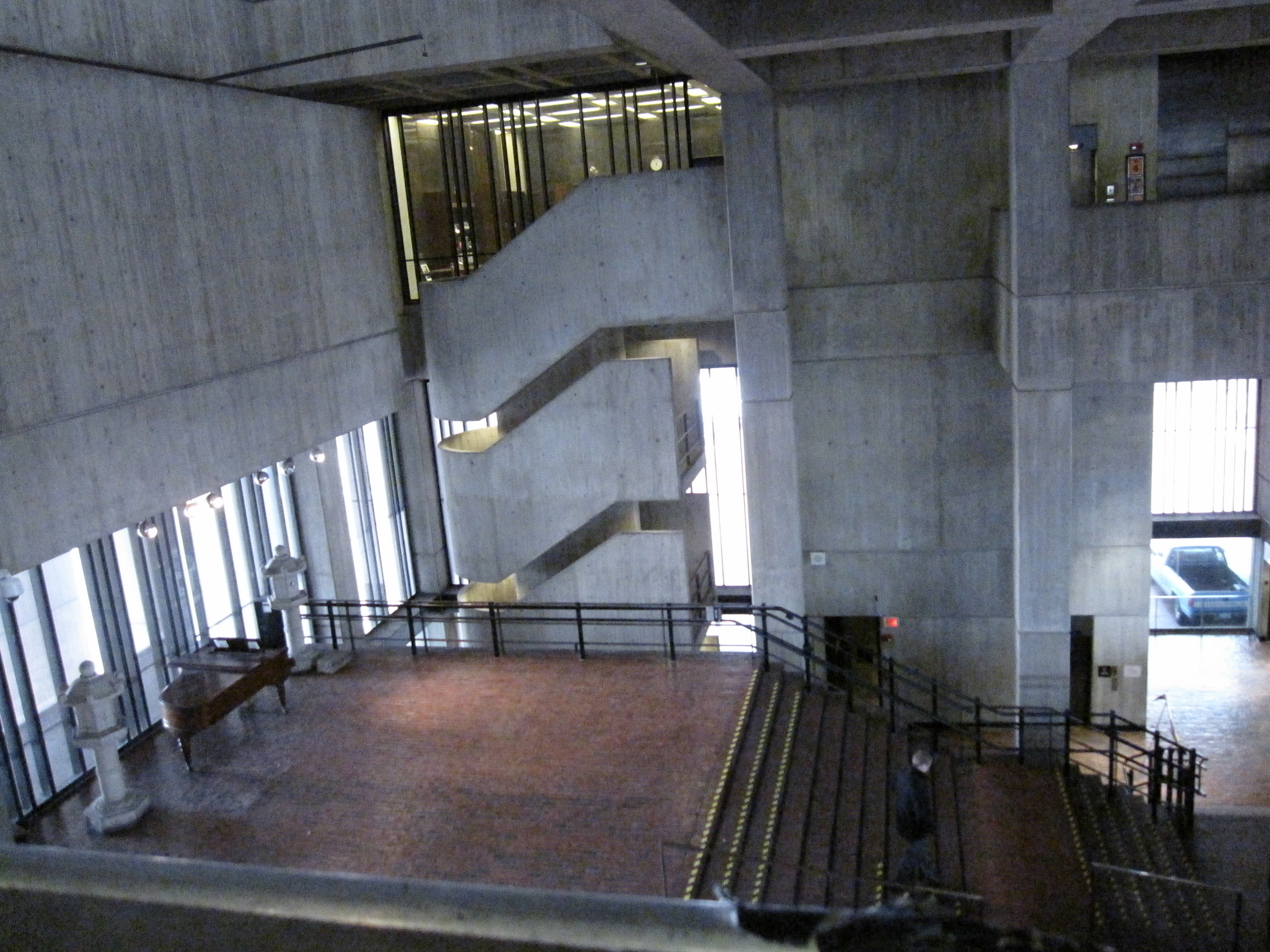
Main Atrium Staircase, Boston City Hall (1981)

This 2014 installation in the Boston City Hall building was the product of a New Urbanism design competition run by Boston Mayor Marty Walsh's Office of New Urban Mechanics, aimed at improving public spaces in Boston with temporary, low-budget installations designed to "surprise and delight." One of 9 winners of the 2014 Public Space Invitational, LaManche's "Stairs of Fabulousness" placed 1,200 linear feet of safety non-skid tape on the large central brick staircase in Boston City Hall's main atrium, a building renown for its off-putting Brutalist aesthetic and failure to create a "welcoming public space." LaManche's tape, in an array of fluorescent colors, created a large rainbow gradient over the whole height of the staircase, which served "to essentially transform the concrete milieu into something colorful and inviting."

"Stairs of Fabulousness" was described as "simple yet tremendously effective." The installation was praised for having brought vibrant, attractive color to the Boston City Hall stairs, and LaManche was lauded for her work as one of "Fifty on Fire" in the Boston culture scene: "anyone who can successfully spice up the facade of Government Center through creativity is on fire in our books."

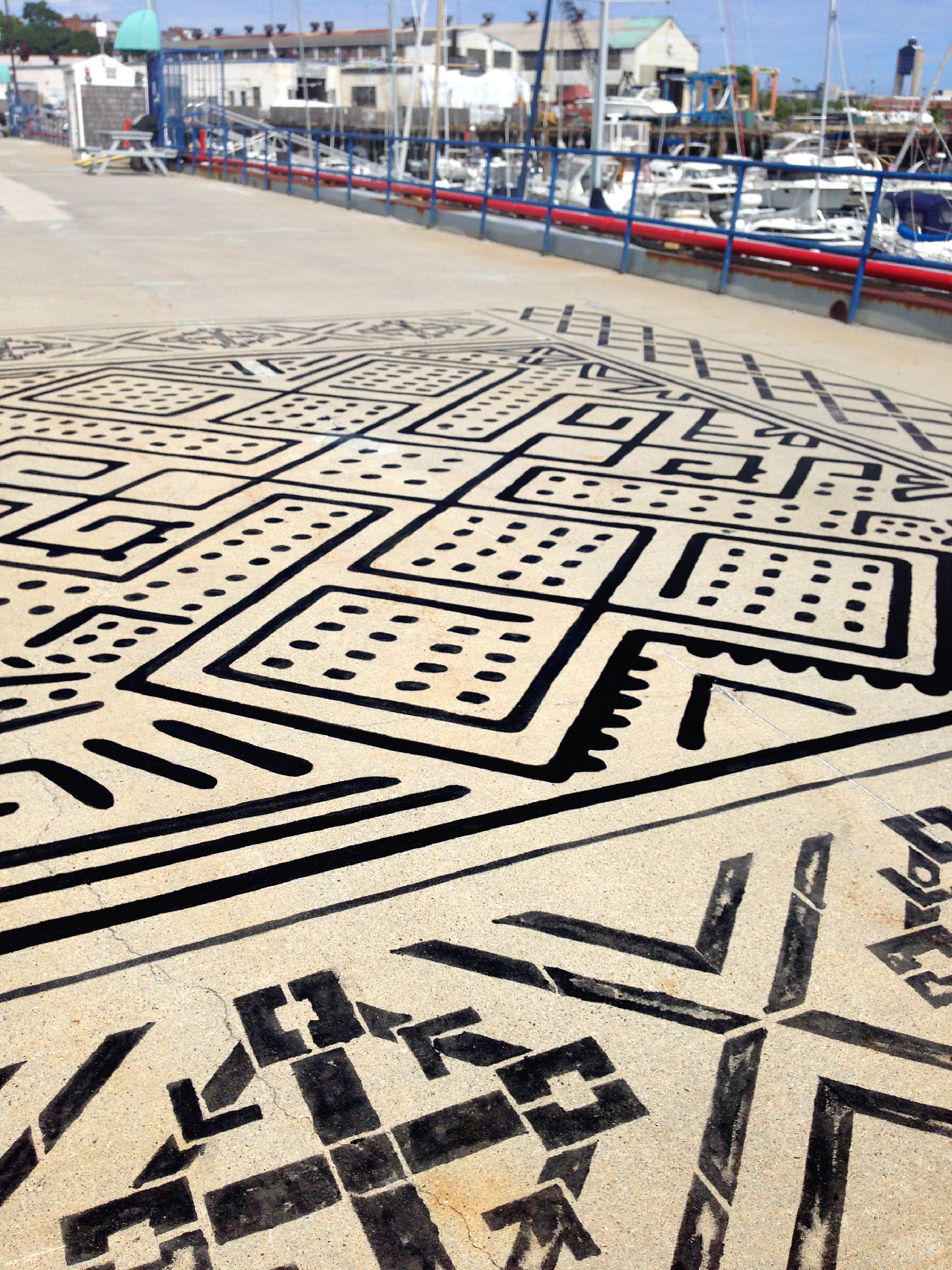
"Connected By Sea (West African Tattoo)" East Boston Shipyard, Liz LaManche

==== "Connected By Sea" (2014–16) ====
"Connected by Sea" or the "Dock Tattoo Project", also dubbed "The 1000-foot tattoo" is located in a sculpture park in a working shipyard in East Boston that is part of the Boston Harborwalk. A series of 19 large tattoo-themed designs, stained into the cement surface of a 1000-foot long pier, forms a walking path to its end and a view of Boston Harbor. The work illuminates :"the cultures local maritime trade has connected with around the world" to a "poignant" effect, memorializing the "indelible bond" Boston maintains with its harbor. This inclusive and multicultural story of Boston's history was ranked as one of the "50 best pieces of Boston public art" by WBUR's ARTery in 2016.

==== "Salem's Connected World" (2015) ====
A sister project to "Connected By Sea", this temporary installation made up a walking path that covered three city blocks of the Downtown Salem District in Salem, Massachusetts. It consisted of painted tattoo-themed symbols and designs from the different cultures specifically connected to Salem's maritime history. Installed in the spring of 2015, it was the first project funded by the new Salem Public Art Commission. Some of the designs are still visible along the cement walk of Artists Row.

==== "Lowell: Water and Work" (2016) ====
A commissioned piece for the City of Lowell, Massachusetts, the entire installation included a 16-foot mural, and 2 blocks of sidewalk and other wall art along a new pedestrian walkway, and "rain art" using hydrophobic coating on the pavement to make art that appears when it rains. The entire project, called the Decatur WAY Green Alley, created a pedestrian walkway from a disused back alley in a program to use green technology to deal with storm water runoff. The mural depicts the Lowell mills and canals with a portrait of a young Harriet Hanson Robinson, a mill worker who became a labor leader and suffragette.

=== Small-scale public art & street art ===
- Wraparound building exterior in Bartlett Yard, Boston.
- Cambridge Brewing Company mural, 2014.
- "The Goddess of Winter Hill", Somerville, MA 2014: 8x10-foot panels on the rear of Somerville post office. Client: City of Somerville.
- "Safety Dance" crosswalk, 2016: 96-foot long crosswalk depicting pedestrian safety figures dancing.
- "The Tattoo Heart", a Boston street piano, 2016.
- "The Soul's Journey As A Series of Weird Old Cars" Somerville, MA 2016.

== See also ==
- Firefly Arts Collective

== Writing ==
- "Connected By Sea" The Artists Working: Theory and Practice, Vol. 1 No. 1, pp. 59–72. May 2016 ISBN 978-0-692-72809-3
