= Paris Dennard =

American political strategist (born 1982)

Personal details
- Born: August 18, 1982 (age 43) Phoenix, Arizona, U.S.
- Party: Republican
- Education: Pepperdine University (BA)

Paris Dennard (born August 18, 1982) is an American conservative political commentator, columnist, and communications strategist. He previously worked from 2005 to 2009 in the White House of President George W. Bush, and the Thurgood Marshall College Fund for over four years as the Senior Director of Strategic Communications. He has appeared as a conservative commentator on many national outlets including Fox News, Black News Channel, Newsmax, CNN and NPR.

== Early life and education ==
While attending Brophy College Preparatory in Phoenix, Arizona, Dennard served as Student Body President, the chairman of the Arizona Teenage Republicans and spoke at the 2000 Republican National Convention in Philadelphia. After graduating from Brophy in 2000, Dennard attended Pepperdine University on several scholarships including one for students of color. He was featured with Sean Combs for an MTV special and interview at the 2004 Republican National Convention. Dennard graduated from Pepperdine in 2005 with a B.A. in political science and public relations.

== Professional career ==
=== White House staff ===
Between 2005 and 2009, Dennard worked in George W. Bush's White House at the Office of Legislative Affairs, the Office of Political Affairs, and the Office of Public Liaison. During that time, he served as White House Director of Black Outreach; coordinated the meetings and travels of the President, First Lady Laura Bush, and the House of Representatives; and planned various events in the White House. Between 2009 and 2011, Dennard worked at the Republican National Committee as an associate director for Coalitions.

=== Communications consulting ===
Dennard is also a consultant through his own firm on strategic communication, political management, image and brand development, and media training issues.

=== Political commentary and activism ===
Dennard is a member of the American Enterprise Institute's Leadership Network. Dennard served on the advisory board for "Black Voices for Trump" for the 2020 re-election campaign for Donald Trump.

Dennard has been a political TV commentator on C-SPAN, BBC, OANN, Newsmax TV, Hill TV, KTOE's "Al in the Afternoon", and TV One where he was a regular on NewsOne Now with Roland S. Martin, BET's State of the Union coverage, MSNBC, and was a paid political commentator with CNN from 2016 to 2018 and NPR's Here and Now. Dennard also writes opinion articles that have appeared in The Daily Caller and The Hill on a host of topics.

Dennard is known for his pro-Donald Trump commentary; he frequently defended Trump and his administration in his CNN appearances. Trump praised Dennard during a White House Black History Month event and a "Black Voices for Trump" event in Atlanta, Georgia. In 2018, Trump appointed Dennard to the President's Commission on White House Fellowships.

After Trump was defeated by Democratic challenger Joe Biden, Dennard was hired as a national spokesman for the Republican Party. As Trump promoted false claims of election fraud, Dennard refused to acknowledge the legitimacy of the results of the 2020 presidential election.

=== Sexual harassment allegations ===
Dennard was employed by the Arizona State University's McCain Institute for International Leadership from 2013 to 2015. In 2018, The Washington Post reported that, according to documents and a university official, Dennard had been fired in 2015 from his position as an events director at the institute for making sexually explicit comments and gestures toward women. Dennard had "told a recent college graduate who worked for him that he wanted to have sex with her" and "pretended to unzip his pants in her presence, tried to get her to sit on his lap, and made masturbatory gestures." A 2014 university report obtained by the Washington Post stated that Dennard did not dispute the claims, but said he made the remarks and gestures jokingly. A second female employee also said that Dennard's actions made her uncomfortable.

After the Washington Post report was published, CNN and Boston NPR member station WBUR-FM announced they had suspended Dennard with pay pending further investigation. After Dennard's contract expired, CNN did not renew it.

In 2019, Dennard sued the Arizona State University for nearly $10 million, claiming that the university had intentionally leaked the report.

=== Republican National Committee ===
In March 2020, Dennard was hired by the Republican National Committee, subsequently working as a national spokesperson and as director of Black media affairs. During the 2020 presidential campaign, he also served on the advisory board of Black Voices for Trump. The RNC fired Dennard in August 2022.

== See also ==
- Black conservatism in the United States
