= Benjamin Gaulon =

French artist

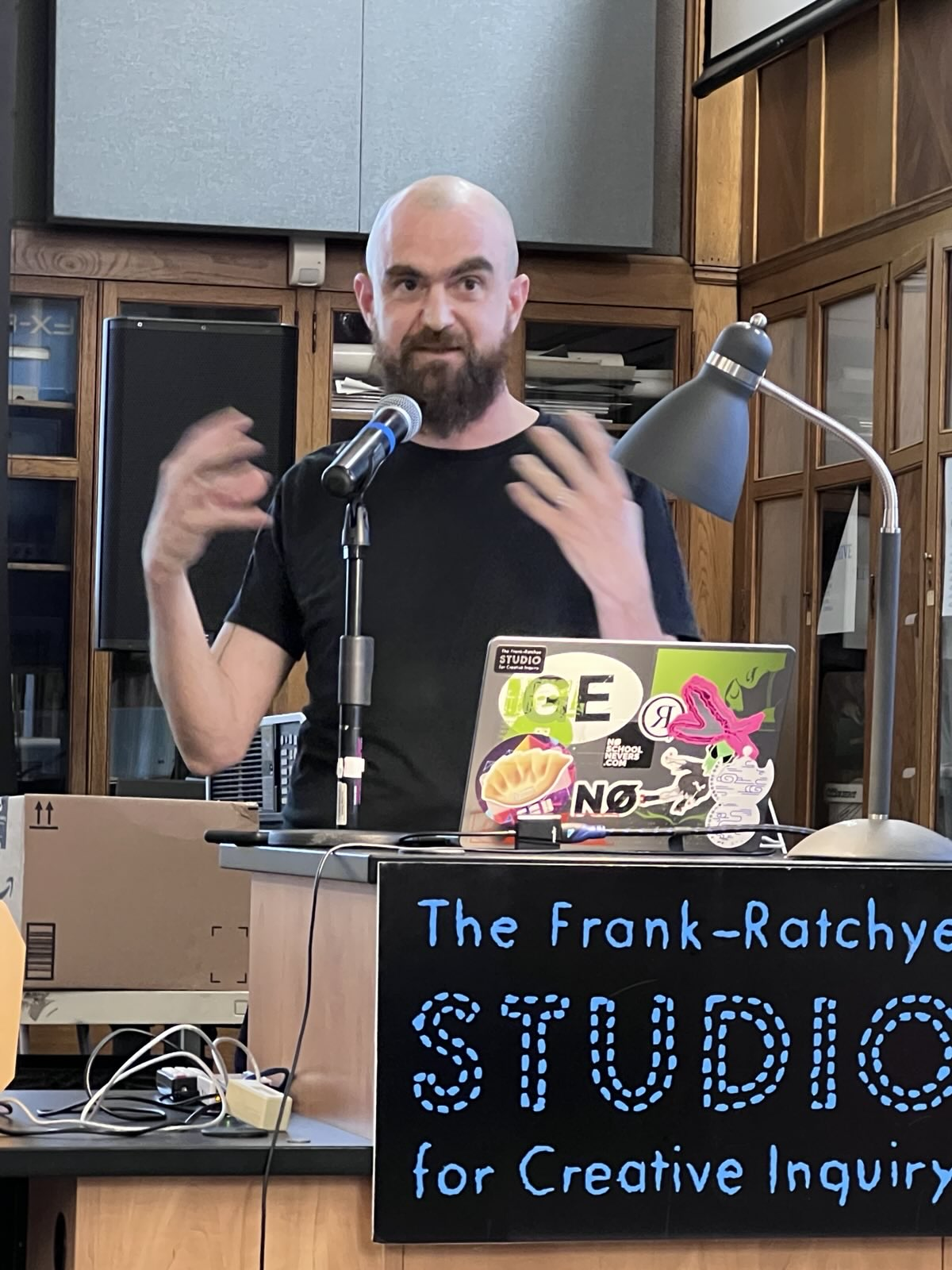
- Benjamin Gaulon @ Carnegie Mellon University
- Born: Benjamin Gaulon; 29 June 1979 (age 47); Montereau-Fault-Yonne, Seine-et-Marne, France
- Education: École Supérieure de Arts Décoratifs and Frank Mohr Institute
- Known for: interactive art, programming, generative art, digital art, net art, physical computing, net art, circuit bending, glitch art
- Notable work: Recyslism
- Website: www.recyclism.com

Benjamin Gaulon (born 29 June 1979 in Montereau-Fault-Yonne, Seine-et-Marne, France) is a French artistresearcher, educator and cultural producer whose work explores the environmental and social impacts of consumer technologies. Since the early 2000s, his practice has addressed issues such as planned obsolescence, consumerism, disposable society and consumer culture through circuit bending, hardware hacking, and media archaeology. He has previously released work under the name "recyclism". More recently, Gaulon has expanded his research into ecological and technological symbiosis, co-founding the collective Nø (2018) and Nø School Nevers (2019), and developing projects such as the Internet of Living Things (2025).

== Biography ==
Benjamin Gaulon is known for critical interventions that repurpose consumer technologies and question the lifecycle of electronic devices. His projects often address obsolescence, electronic waste, and the hidden infrastructures of networked systems, through interactive installations, workshops, and performances.

He received a degree in Visual Communication from l'École Supérieure des Arts Décoratifs de Strasbourg and a MFA in Interactive Media & Environment from the Frank Mohr Institute. During his time at the Frank Mohr Institute, he developed several high-profile projects, including de Pong Game, the Recycling Entertainment System, The PrintBall and Corrupt.

After Graduating, Benjamin Gaulon started leading 'D.A.T.A. (Dublin Art and Technology Association) and co-founded the Irish Museum of Contemporary Art in 2007. Since 2005, in collaboration with Lourens Rozema, he is running workshops entitled the e-waste workshops, inviting participants to create art projects from recycled electronic waste.

From 2006 to 2013, he was a lecturer in fine art media at the National College of Art and Design in Dublin, where he taught courses on digital media, electronics, and critical approaches to technology.

From 2013 to 2018, Benjamin Gaulon was Assistant Professor and Program Director at Parsons Paris, where he launched and directed the BFA in Art, Media & Technology (2013) and the MFA in Design + Technology (2014). He also served on key academic committees and contributed to faculty recruitment, training, and student advising.

In 2018, Benjamin Gaulon co-founded the collective Nø with artist Dasha Ilina, a non-profit dedicated to promoting emerging art and design research on the environmental and social dimensions of information and communication technologies (ICTs).

Since 2019, he has also been co-director of Nø Nevers, an annual summer school and festival in Nevers, France, combining workshops, lectures, and exhibitions on digital culture and critical design.

He currently teaches at SciencesPo, École normale supérieure Paris-Saclay (diplôme en Recherche-Création, ARRC), CentraleSupélec – Université Paris-Saclay, and is a regular lecturer at HEAD – Genève (Haute école d'art et de design).

== Notable projects ==
- Recycle Bin Project (2002) – An open-source software intervention exploring digital waste and the lifecycle of deleted files.
- De Pong Game : Augmented Reality (2003) – An augmented architecture interactive projection.
- Digitalrecycling (2004) – An online community project.
- Corrupt (2004) – An online glitching software.
- The PrintBall (2004-2005) – A modified paintball gun used as a printing device, merging street art, robotics, and hacking culture (with Géraud de Bizien)
- Recycling Entertainment System (2004) – An interactive installation.
- 2.4 kHz Project (2008) – A series of works repurposing wireless camera signals to expose the lack of privacy and security in consumer surveillance devices.
- Hard Drivin' (2010) – A Twitter controlled installation. (with Ivan Twohig and Brian Solon)
- ReFunct Media (since 2010) – A Hardware hacking installation.
- Internet of Living Things (2025) — Developed during a residency at Creative Coding Utrecht (CCU), IoLT is a prototype "technological totem" merging obsolete artifacts, live plants, and electroculture devices, investigating how electromagnetic fields might influence plant growth and how electronic waste can be reimagined within ecological systems.
- The Internet of Dead Things (2025) — This book explores the creative reuse of obsolete digital devices and electronic waste. Developed through the Internet of Dead Things Institute, the book presents projects that transform outdated technologies—like Minitel terminals—into functional, open-source tools, investigating sustainability, planned obsolescence, and the ecological and cultural potential of “dead” technologies.

== Exhibitions ==
Selected exhibitions, screenings and performances include:

- 2011, Resonate – Belgrade – Serbia
- 2011, C4 Contemporary Art – Los Angeles – USA
- 2011, Flux Factory – New York City – USA
- 2011, R.I.P. – Recycling Pervasive Media, Intervening in Planned Obsolescence – Banff – Canada
- 2011, New York Electronic Art Festival 2011 – Harvestworks – NYC – USA
- 2011, Bent Festival 2011 – NYC – USA
- 2011, Filtering Failure, Amsterdam, the Netherlands
- 2010, BLK River Festival, Vienna, Austria
- 2010, Les Grandes Traversées 2010, Royan, Soulac, Bordeaux, France
- 2010, Arts Research: Publics and Purposes conference, GradCam, Temple Bar Gallery, Dublin, Ireland
- 2009, International Symposium on Electronic Art 2009, Dublin, Ireland
- 2009, ISEA 2009, The LAB, Dublin, Ireland
- 2008, Dublin Electronic Art Festival 2008, Dublin, Ireland
- 2008, Square Eyes Festival, Arnhem, The Netherlands
- 2008, TECHNOTHREADS, The Science Gallery, Trinity College. Dublin, Ireland
- 2008, Lightwave08, The Science Gallery, Trinity College. Dublin, Ireland
- 2007, Dublin Electronic Art Festival 2007, Dublin, Ireland
- 2007, Cluster, Gallery la Chaufferie, École Supérieure des Art Décoratifs de Strasbourg, France
- 2007, Come out and Play, Amsterdam, the Netherlands
- 2007, Sous la Plage, Paris, France
- 2006, SUPERFLUX, Gallery Roger Tator, Lyon, France
- 2006, €10000 SHOW, W139, Amsterdam, the Netherlands
- 2006, Art Rock, Inter-disciplinary Festival, St Brieuc, France
- 2005, Ososphere Festival, Strasbourg, France
- 2005, Axis Festival, Assen, The Netherlands
- 2004, Cite Rap Festival N.6, St Brieuc, France
- 2004, Festival Sonic Acts X Unsorted, Amsterdam, the Netherlands
