= Roddy Schrock =

American artist (born 1976)

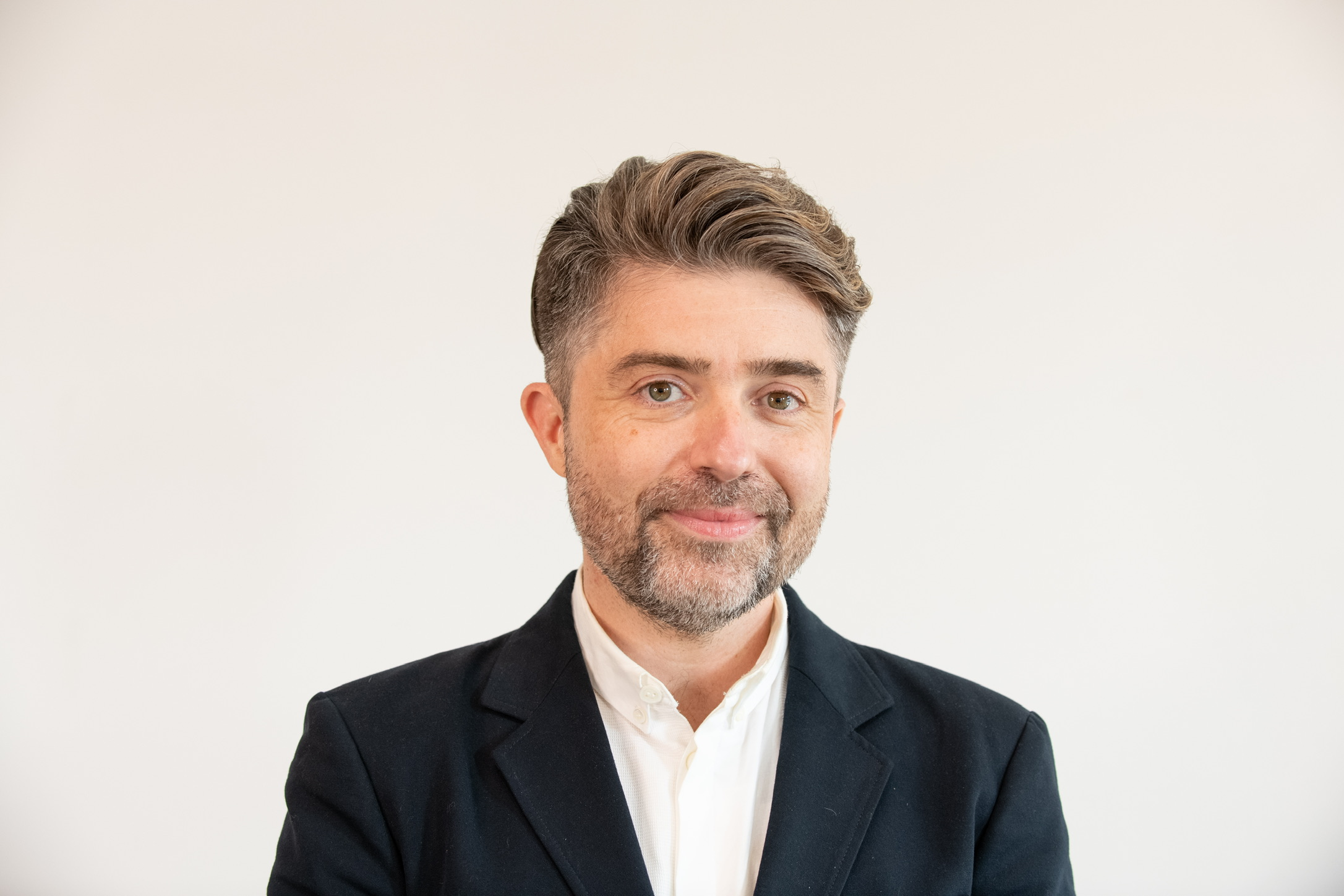
- Born: Roderick Schrock
- Education: MFA Electronic Music and Recording Media, Mills College
- Known for: Sound art, digital art, arts management, curation

Roderick Schrock is an arts executive and curator. He has been the Executive Director at Eyebeam since July, 2015.

== Biography ==
Schrock received an MFA in electronic music and recording media from Mills College, and a certificate in sonology from the Royal Conservatory of The Hague as well as a certificate in Non-Profit Management from Harvard University.

He currently teaches in the Curatorial Practice MA Program at the School of Visual Arts and has taught at STEIM (Amsterdam), California College of the Arts, and New York University's Interactive Telecommunications Program. He sits on the Netherlands America Foundation Cultural Committee, is a member of the Guild of Future Architects, and is a founding board member of Art+Feminism. Schrock's essays have been published by MIT Press and appears regularly in Hyperallergic. He has also written for New Music Box, Fucking Good Art, and e/i magazine. He has lived and worked in Tokyo, the Netherlands, and Northern California and is now based in New York.

== Arts organizer and curator, 2010-present ==
As an arts organizer and curator, he focuses on building support, financially and culturally, for artists whose work directly confronts complex societal issues, particular in relationship to technology and society. This takes the form of executive leadership of Eyebeam, as a freelance curator, an educator, and as a general arts advocate.

=== Arts organizer ===
- co-organizer of Eyebeam Center for the Future of Journalism, an experimental program that melds journalistic practice with the arts
- lead organizer, Refiguring the Future exhibition and conference
- building conditions for creativity: Confessions of a Failed Artist
- vision at Eyebeam: Tech Meets Poetry

=== Curator ===
- A Becoming Resemblance, solo exhibition of Heather Dewey-Hagborg, Fridman Gallery, 2017
- Eyebeam In Objects, Upfor Gallery, 2015
- Slipped Gears, Usdan Gallery, 2014
- Three Pieces, apartment events, 2007-2010

== Artist, 1999-2009 ==
As a digital musician and composer, Schrock has been commissioned by Meet the Composer, the American Music Center, The Netherlands America Foundation, and Ostrava New Music Days, among others.

=== Events, performances, and discography (partial list) ===
- For Freddie: Freddie Herko Memorial Evocation] (in collaboration with Deric Carner), 2007
- Kunsole, 2008
- Duotone, 2009
- Ostrava Days Festival, 2001
- POP!!! snap, crackle... Tour (as Tog), 2002
- Performance with Seamus Cater, 2005
- Performance with Pamela Z and STEIM, 2005
- "Crumpled Stream" on The September 11 Tragedy: A Musical Gallery, 2002
- An Unacceptable Color, 2003 (as Tog)
- The Tokyo Cowboy Meets His Maker Under The Neon Stars, 2004
- "Water Song" on Otto Spooky by Momus, 2005
- "If You Make Your Bed in Heaven" on Our Lives in the Bush of Disquiet, a 2005 remix album of David Byrne and Brian Eno's album My Life in the Bush of Ghosts

=== Other collaborations ===
- Sound engineering for Stefani Bardin's M2A™: The Fantastic Voyage, 2011
