= Yael Kanarek =

American artist (born 1967)

Yael Kanarek יעל קנרק
- Born: July 7, 1967 (age 59); New York City, U.S.
- Education: Rensselaer Polytechnic Institute, MFA Empire State College, BFA
- Known for: Painting, sculpture, internet art, photography, digital art, electronic literature, performance art, multilingualism
- Notable work: World of Awe, 1995-ongoing Textworks, 2007-ongoing
- Movement: Internet art, conceptual art
- Awards: 2014 WTN Award in the Arts and 2002 CNRS/UNESCO, Lewis Carroll Argos Prize, Paris.

Yael Kanarek (Hebrew: יעל קנרק; born 1967) is an Israeli American artist based in New York City that is known for pioneering use of the Internet and of multilingualism in work of art.

== Background and education ==
Born in New York and raised in Israel, Kanarek returned to New York in 1991 for art school and began exhibiting in galleries. Kanarek was a leading figure in the early days of the internet art scene in New York and collaborated for over ten years with Eyebeam, where she founded and led the Upgrade!, an international network of artists and curators concerned with art, technology and activism.

Kanarek has been developing an integrated media project called World of Awe since 1995. At the core of World of Awe is "The Traveler's Journal"—an original narrative that uses the ancient genre of the traveler's tale to explore connections between storytelling, travel, memory and technology. Her pioneering online art practice was featured in 2002 Whitney Biennial, which included a World of Awe portal and a series of related drawings. In that same year, she was also commissioned by the SF MoMA and Turbulence.org to continue its development online.

She earned a Master of Fine Arts in 2007 from Rensselaer Polytechnic Institute and a Bachelor of Fine Arts from Empire State College in 1993. Kanarek teaches new media art at Pratt Institute.

== Career ==
Since 2003, her practice has been focused on multilingualism, and her observation of how language online acts as a border and a space.

Kanarek's art has been primarily exhibited in the US and Europe. Solo exhibitions of her work have been presented at Jewish Museum (Manhattan), Nelly Aman Gallery in Tel Aviv, bitforms gallery in New York, Sala Uno Gallery in Rome, the Moving Image Gallery in New York, and Space Time Light Gallery in New York. Kanarek's work has also been featured by The Drawing Center, The Kitchen, American Museum of the Moving Image, Whitney Museum of American Art; Iris & B. Gerald Cantor Center for Visual Arts, National Museum of Contemporary Art in Athens, Beral Madra Contemporary Art in Istanbul, Rhizome (organization), Exit Art, A.I.R. Gallery, Holster Projects in London, LIMN Gallery in San Francisco, Wood Street Galleries in Pittsburgh, CU Museum in Boulder, Arena 1 in Santa Monica, SIGGRAPH; California College of the Arts, Ronald Feldman Gallery in New York, Derek Eller Gallery in New York, 303 Gallery in New York, Schroeder Romero Gallery in New York, among many others.

She has been a founder of the company KANAREK since 2013, a fine jewelry company that specializes in text jewelry. They use custom text created by her and work closely with the clients to create these fine jewelry.

== Specific works ==
=== World of Awe series, 1994 -2011 ===
World of Awe is a cross-disciplinary project centering around The Traveler's Journal, an original narrative started in 1994 and completed in 2011. Set in an undetermined future past, it reveals the story of a lone traveler who searches for a lost treasure in a parallel world called Sunset/Sunrise. The portal to this world is on 419 East 6th Street in Manhattan.

The narrative first appeared in paintings, followed by performance and the early net art website Love Letters from a World of Awe in 1995. Since then, the project has expanded into other media including sculpture, installation, and Text works. The culture of digital media and technology of the 80's and 90's are critical to the narrative. It functions as both a visual and literary devoice that forms the identity of the traveler. The work was shown in Bitforms gallery, New York City, in 2004 and Rhizome's gallery in 2016.

=== Textwork series, 2007 ===
The Textwork series started in 2007 with Hebrew, Arabic and English. It has since grown more complex and has incorporated additional languages. In 2010, she began a series of screen-based computational video clocks. These works are audiovisual collages that runs on custom software designed by her and Shawn Lawson. This project centers around the fundamental hypothesis that language and numerals render reality that is an entirely subjective singular field. Kanarek's Textwork Series may seem to be analog on the surface, but Kanarek utilizes some creative new media techniques to weave the works through the digital realm. In an interview with Daily Serving she discusses her work and the Textwork series.

=== Clock: Jerusalem to Tel Aviv, 2010 ===
This video shows Highway 1 from Jerusalem to Tel Aviv, from inside a taxi, synchronized with a clock.

=== DAY/NIGHT, 2017 ===
In 2017, Kanarek was awarded a commission by the US State Department's Art in Embassies program to create a large-scale sculpture for the new consulate in Harare, Zimbabwe. DAY/NIGHT a site specific sculpture in Harare. It is a cluster of words of 76 units for the word Day/Night written in 19 languages spoken in Zimbabwe. This work uses 19 languages, including: Barwe: Masikati - Usiku, Chewa: Masana - Usiku, Doma: Masikati - Usiku, English: Day - Night, Hwesa: Masikati - Usiku, Jahunda: Masikati - Mahwela, Kalanga: Masikati - Busiku, Khoisan: Dzini - Hae, Kunda: Masikati - Usiku, Nambya: Muzhuba - Busiku, Ndau: Masikati - Usiku, Ndebele: Emini - Ebusuku, Shona: Masikati - Usiku, Sotho: Motsehare - Bosiu, Tonga: Sikati - Mansiku, Tsonga/Shangani: Siku - Vusiku, Tswana: Motshegare - Bosigo, Venda: Masiari - Vhusiku, and Xhosa: Imini - Ubusuku.

=== Toratah (Her Torah), 2022 ===
As an Israeli-American artist, one of her works involved rewriting the entire Torah- both in Hebrew and English- by changing the gender of all the characters within it. This work "offers a matriarchal structure, female characters, and feminine divinity." Kanarek called it the Toratah, which shed light on the patriarchal social structures we live in. Along with that, it codified women's experiences and inspired to descend through mother/daughter lineages, within the traditional language of the Hebrew Bible. The project also incorporates a music album based on some of the regendered verses.

== Awards ==
Kanarek has been recognized in the United States and abroad with awards including the Rockefeller 2005 New Media Fellowship, 2003 Netizens Webprize, and CNRS/UNESCO Lewis Carroll Argos prize in France, and World Technology Network (WTN) 2014. She has received grants from the Jerome Foundation Media Arts, New York Foundation for the Arts, and commissions from San Francisco Museum of Modern Art, Turbulence.org, and the Alternative Museum. Kanarek has also completed artist residencies at Eyebeam, Harvestworks, Civitella Ranieri, and the Mamuta Art and Media Center.
