= Julia Kaganskiy =

American cultural producer (born 1986)

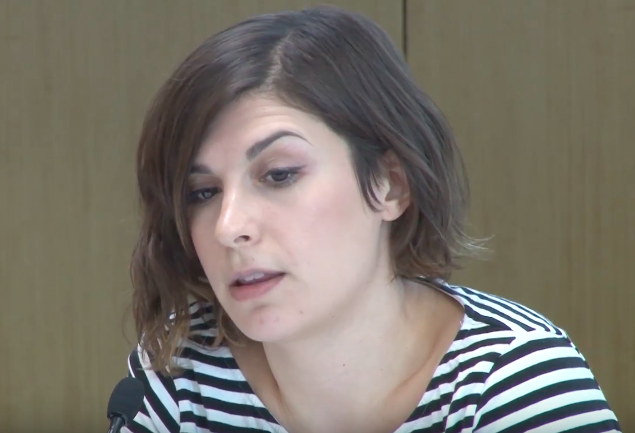
- Born: May 22, 1986 (age 40); Kiev, Ukrainian SSR, Soviet Union (now Kyiv, Ukraine)
- Occupation: Cultural producer

Julia Kaganskiy (born May 22, 1986) is a New York-based cultural producer. She was the founding director of NEW INC, the New Museum's incubator for art, technology, and design, and is known for starting the art, culture, and technology meetup group ArtsTech in 2008. As of April 2026, she is the executive director of Eyebeam, an organization that "support[s] artists who create with technology."

== Early life ==
Kaganskiy was born in Kiev, Ukrainian SSR, Soviet Union (now Kyiv, Ukraine), where her father was an engineer and her mother worked as a music teacher. She spent her childhood visiting her great-grandmother's family house in a small village outside of Kyiv. At the age of six, her family emigrated to Brooklyn, New York, where her parents encountered initial difficulty due to language barriers. After Kaganskiy's parents learned computer programming in the early 1990s, her family established a middle-class household.

Kaganskiy completed her bachelor's degree in journalism at Emerson College in 2007.

== Career ==
In 2008, Kaganskiy started the New York-based arts, culture, and technology meetup group ArtsTech shortly after graduating. She subsequently interned at the Museum of Modern Art's digital learning department in 2009, and started to curate pop-up shows for new media art.

In 2010, VICE Media invited Kaganskiy to join the Creators Project, an arts/technology publication founded in partnership with Intel, where she served as Global Editor until 2014. In 2014, the New Museum appointed Kaganskiy director of NEW INC, a cultural incubator launched to support artists, innovators, and entrepreneurs working in art, design, and technology. After launching, running and growing NEW INC for five years, she became a freelance curator and cultural strategist and continued to work with the New Museum as Curatorial Advisor for NEW INC's artist residency program in collaboration with Nokia Bell Labs and their Experiments in Art and Technology Lab. She co-curated the Tentacular festival at the Matadero in Madrid in 2019.

She has been profiled as an influential woman in technology by Fast Company (2011), the AOL/PBS series "MAKERS" (2012), and Business Insider (2013) and named to Crain’s New York Business 40 Under 40 list (2015).
