= Brophy College Preparatory =

Private school in Phoenix, Arizona

Location
- 4701 North Central Avenue; Phoenix, Arizona 85012; United States; 33°30′22″N 112°4′24″W

Information
- Type: Private college-preparatory school
- Motto: Ad Majorem Dei Gloriam (For the Greater Glory of God)
- Religious affiliation: (Catholic)
- Established: 1928; 98 years ago
- Founder: Ellen A. Brophy
- CEEB code: 030-265
- President: Robert E. Ryan
- Principal: Jim Bopp
- Teaching staff: 102.6 (FTE) (2019–20)
- Grades: 9–12
- Gender: all-male
- Enrollment: 1,407 (2019–20)
- Student to teacher ratio: 13.7 (2019–20)
- Campus type: Urban
- Colors: Red and white
- Mascot: Bronco
- Nickname: The Stampede
- Accreditation: Western Catholic Education Association; North Central Association of Colleges and Schools
- Newspaper: The Wrangler; The Roundup
- Yearbook: The Tower
- Website: www.brophyprep.org

Brophy College Preparatory is a Catholic high school in Phoenix, Arizona, United States founded in 1928. The school has an all-male enrollment of approximately 1,400 students. It is operated independently of the Roman Catholic Diocese of Phoenix.

The school has three campuses: the main academic campus in north-central Phoenix at Central Avenue and Camelback Road, a retreat center called Manresa on the banks of Oak Creek near Sedona, and the nine-acre Brophy Sports Campus east of the academic campus in Phoenix and adjacent to the campus of the all-girls Xavier College Preparatory. Brophy has no diocesan or government financial assistance. Approximately 65% of the student body identifies as Catholic.

Brophy College Chapel was listed on the National Register of Historic Places in 1993.

== History ==
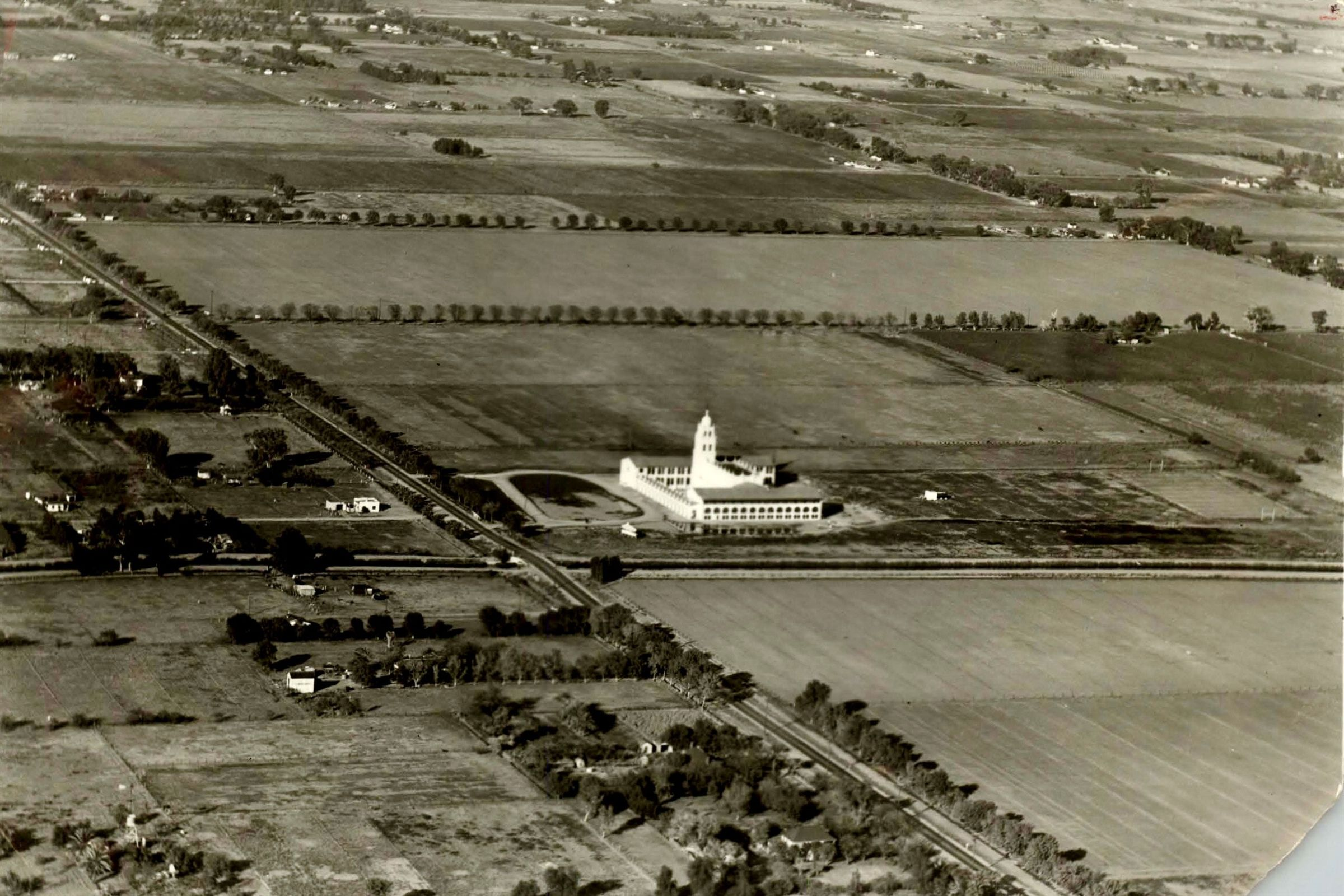
An aerial view of Brophy from 1928

Brophy College Preparatory was founded in 1928 by Ellen A. Brophy, prominent Phoenix church woman and philanthropist, in memory of her late husband William Henry Brophy, as a Catholic high school that included first year college courses. The Regis Hall building (renamed Frank C. Brophy Jr. Hall in 2006), the Catholic residence, and the chapel were completed in 1928, and the school began operating that same year as a college and high school. The Great Depression caused a major financial strain, forcing it to close in 1935. Most of the male students who previously attended Brophy transferred to another local Catholic high school, St. Mary's, which had become an all-girls school once Brophy opened. The boys brought their athletic gear from Brophy with them to St. Mary's, causing St. Mary's to change its school colors from red and white to green and white, the previous Brophy colors.

In 1952, 17 years after its closing, Brophy College Preparatory reopened as a high school. It purchased used athletic equipment from Santa Clara University, whose colors were red and white, the old St. Mary's colors. This is also how they became the Brophy Broncos, adopting the Santa Clara mascot.

Brophy expanded its downtown Phoenix campus by adding Loyola Hall (1959), Robson Gymnasium (1967), Keating Hall, and the Steele Library (1986).

Brophy has raised capital through a major gifts campaign, which has funded the construction of the Innovation Commons (2001), the Eller Fine Arts Center (2003), the McCain Colonnade (2003), the Piper Center for Math and Science (2005), and the Harper Great Hall (2006). The Ethel and Kemper Marley Innovation Commons replaced the Steele Library as the information source on campus.

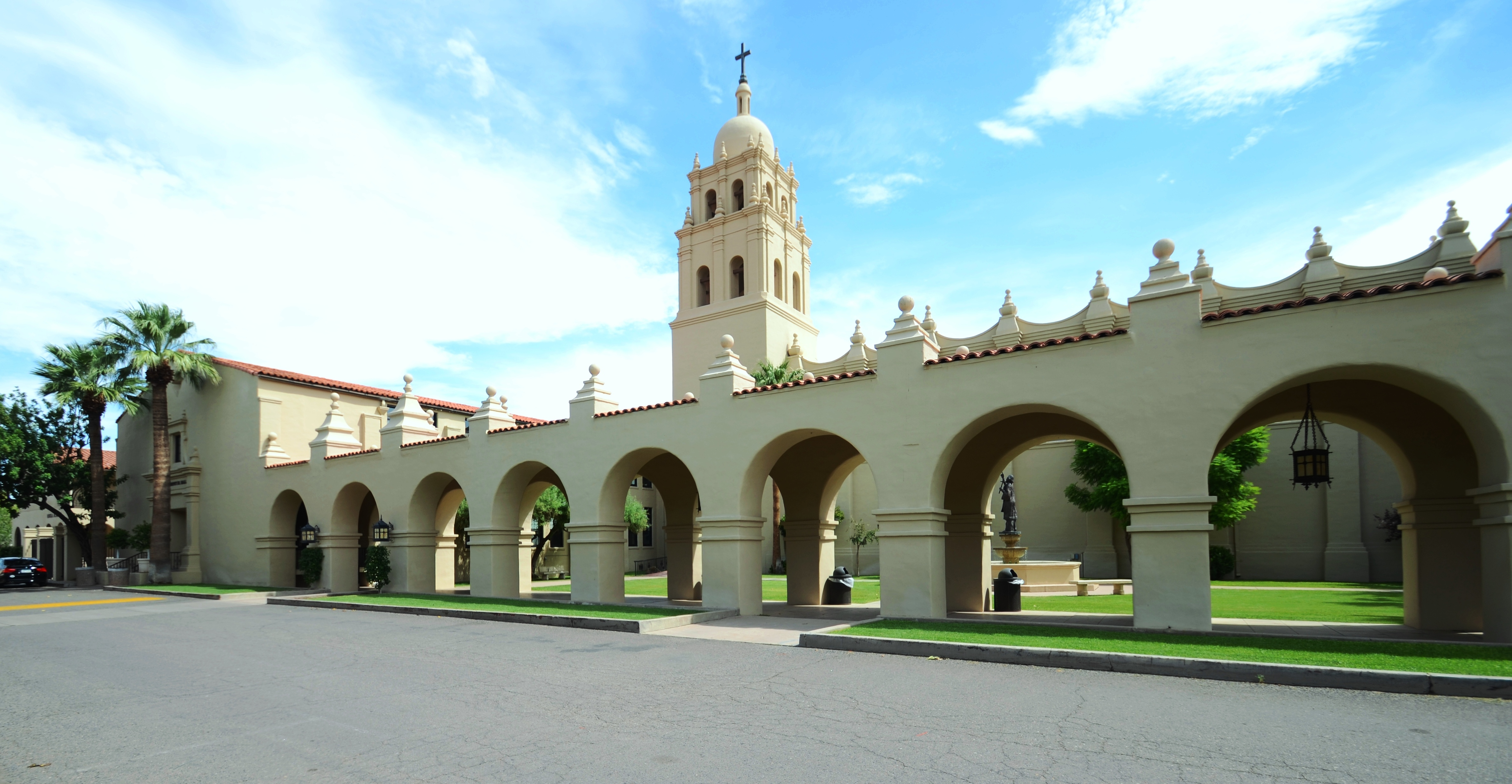
The chapel at Brophy

In November 2002, Brophy acquired the former Phoenix Swim Club for $1.6 million to use as a sports campus. It was called the Dottie Boreyko/Brophy East Swim Campus. The facilities of this 10-acre (40,000 m^{2}) campus included two outdoor swimming pools (one of them Olympic-sized and equipped with two underwater viewing rooms), a 400-meter training track, a soccer field, a running track, and locker rooms. In 2013, Brophy sold the Brophy Swim Campus to Ryland Homes, and it was vacated in early 2014. The school built a pool at its main campus, with further financial assistance from the Class of 2016.

In 2010, Brophy completed construction on its Brophy Sports Campus, which has a synthetic turf field and a natural turf practice field. The completion of this campus marks the first phase of upgrading all of the school's athletic facilities. In 2016, Brophy completed “the Dutch”, a multi-functional gymnasium complete with a basketball court, running track, and underground gym.

== Academics ==
Brophy Prep is the only Jesuit high school in Arizona. Its curriculum relies on a combination of liberal arts principles and Roman Catholic theology. Honors and advanced placement sections exist in each of the curricular disciplines, including 33 advanced placement classes. Students formerly were allowed to take classes at Xavier College Preparatory, a Catholic girls' college preparatory school adjacent to Brophy, until Brophy's change to block scheduling prevented the schools from being on the same schedule. Students may also partake in a dual enrollment program through Rio Salado College to receive college credit for classes they are already taking.

Brophy offers a variety of technology-based classes for first year students like the "Introduction to Innovative Technologies". The course serves as an introduction to the "maker" mentality of imagining, building and creatively solving problems by exposing students to CAD design fundamentals, coding and circuitry. The course uses examples from organizations such as Not Impossible LABS, founded by Brophy alumnus Mick Ebeling.

Brophy was one of the first schools in the country to implement the AP Capstone diploma program, two yearlong AP courses offered by College Board to develop students’ skills in research, analysis, evidence-based arguments, collaboration, writing, and presenting. Students who complete the two-year program can earn one of two different AP Capstone awards, which are valued by colleges across the United States and around the world.

Admission is regarded as selective and is based on academic record, entrance examination, essays, teacher recommendations, and a required interview. For the 2026–2027 academic year, Brophy's annual tuition was US$22,750. Need-based financial aid was available for those who qualified.

== Service ==
Freshmen live out the "Frosh Experience," a three-stage service requirement all students must go through. Students must first embark on the Freshman retreat, an overnight campus retreat typically hosted in September that exposes students to the school's Jesuit traditions of service and justice alongside their senior mentor, referred to as a Big Brother. Next, students partake in a Freshman Breakaway that is a combination of retreat and service immersion project where students are randomly called in on a Tuesday to skip class alongside 6-8 other students and indulge in a day of volunteering. To cap off the frosh experience, freshman partake in a Special Olympics Game Day during the spring semester, in which a day of classes are excused to be assigned a Special Olympian and provide a safe, fun environment for the freshman's new friend.

Every student is required to volunteer for 40 hours their sophomore and junior year alongside proper writing and course requirements.

For seniors, a selective and intensive program named "The Romero Program" is available that serves as the capstone of the students Brophy experience. Students spend half of class discussing graduate-level theological ideas in a liberal arts college format. During the other half, students engage in a year-long internship at an approved praxis site such as the Foundation for Blind Children or St. Joseph's Hospital.

Aside from the mandatory service requirements, a large majority of the student body still decides to partake in immersions, exchanges, and pilgrimages during their time at Brophy. Some of the most common immersion trips include two-week Summer trips to El Salvador and Mexico, as well as a month long trip to Peru. However, many trips still take place during the school year. These include civil rights immersion trips to Alabama and Georgia and trips that examine gang violence and homelessness in Los Angeles and the local Phoenix community.

== Athletics ==
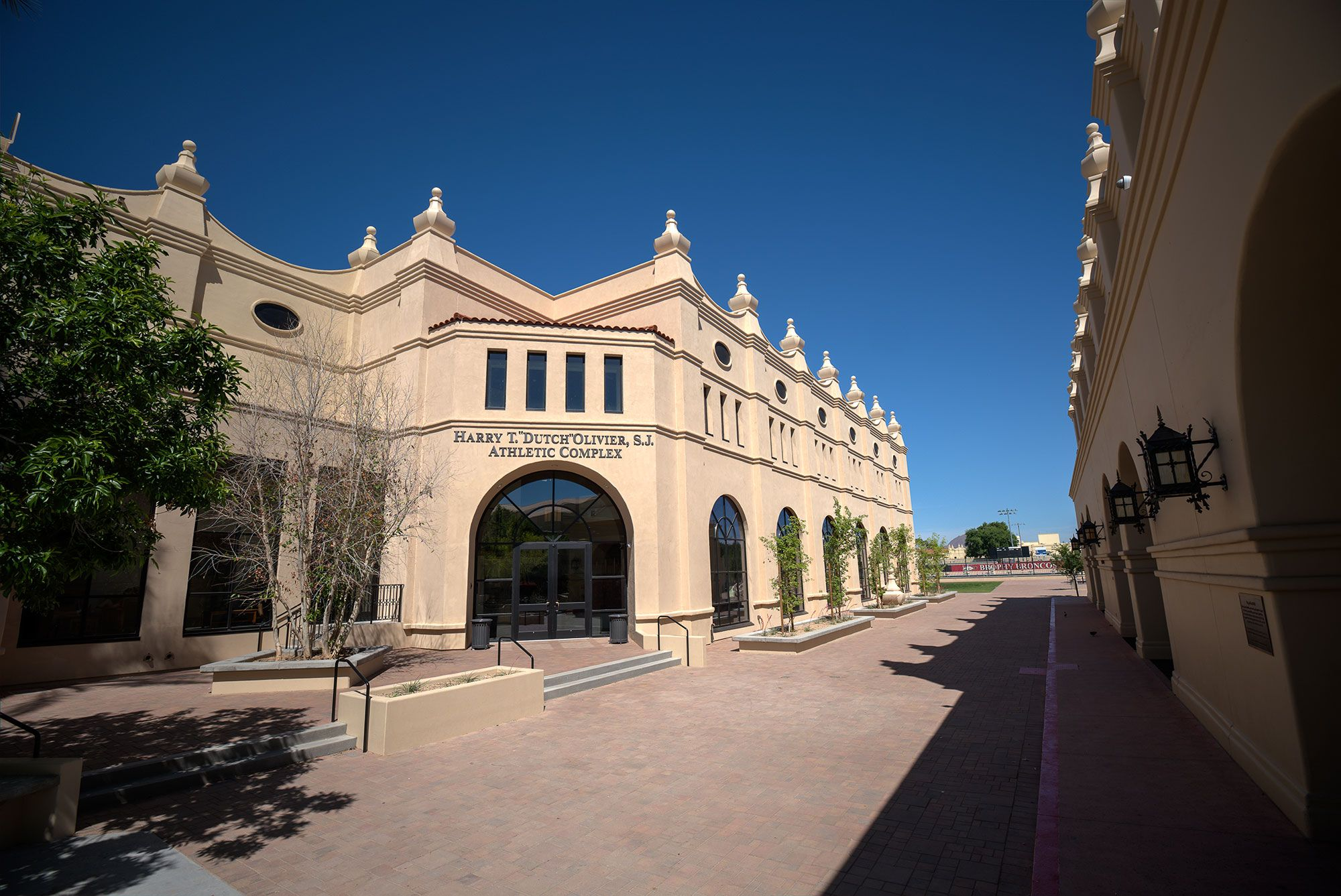
The Dutch is a 47,400-square-foot athletic facility located at the heart of campus.

Brophy fields 26 teams in 12 sports, competing in Region 6 of Arizona's Class 6A Division. Sports Illustrated has ranked Brophy's athletic programs among the top 25 in the nation.

As of 2020, the swim team has won 42 state titles, 32 of which were consecutive. In addition, Brophy has produced several Olympic medalists. In 2005, the Brophy swim team won the national high school championship, being national runner-ups in 2003 and 2008.

Brophy football won the 2005 and 2007 5A-I Football State Championship. The 2005 football team finished ranked third in the West and 21st in the nation by USA Today and ranked 23rd in the country by Sports Illustrated. The baseball and volleyball programs also took state championships in 2006.

In the 2007–2008 season, the Brophy Bronco Soccer Team won the 5A-1 State Championship and finished the season ranked no. 2 on the west coast and no. 8 in the nation. During the 2010–2011 season, the Brophy soccer team won its second 5A-1 State Championship in four years, ending the season as national runners-up. Brophy Soccer won the state title in Division 1 in 2014 and 2015 and was runner-up in 2012. Brophy took home the 5A-1 state title in their 2019–2020 season and ended their season ranked 13 in the nation.

The Brophy lacrosse team has won the Arizona Division I State Championship five times, in 2007, 2008, 2010, 2012, 2013, 2022, 2023 and most recently in 2024.

Brophy is one of two high schools in Arizona that has a rowing team, the other being Xavier College Preparatory. They have rowed at the Head of the Charles regatta. They compete in the South West Junior region. They won the 2011, 2012, and 2013 Arizona State Junior Rowing Championships.

In the 2010–2011 year, Brophy added a rugby club team, the Brophy College Preparatory Rugby Football Club, becoming one of only a few schools in the state to sponsor its own rugby team.

In 2012 Brophy won the 5A Varsity Hockey Championship for the first time, and won their second state championship in 2022.

The Brophy tennis team won state championships in 1973, 1975, 1976, 1981, 1982, 1996–2003, 2009, 2010, 2012–14, 2017–19, and 2022.

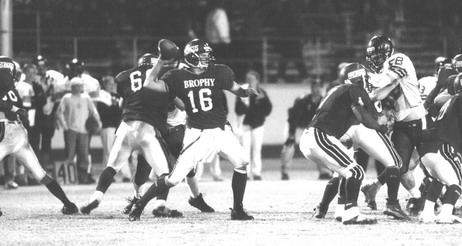
The annual football game between Brophy and Saint Marys, nicknamed The Rivalry, has been occurring since the late 1950s.

Brophy is home to the 2011 and 2013 Arizona-state track champions as well as the 1998, 2001, and 2006 volleyball state champions.

Brophy's golf team finished second place at the Arizona State Championship in 2015 and 2017. Brophy's golf team won the 2018 and 2019 Arizona State Championship.

Brophy is home to the #1 nationally ranked Esports team.

== Student life ==
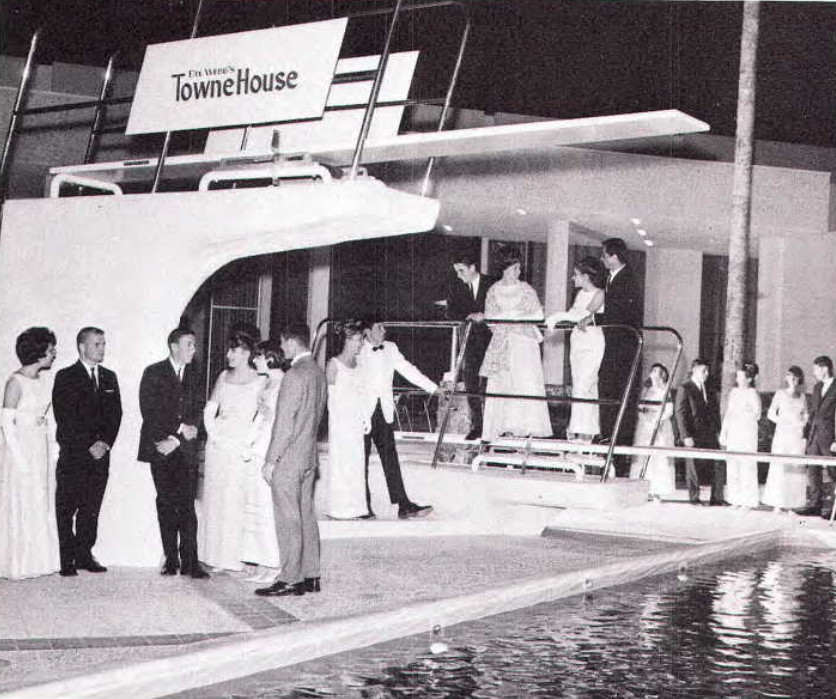
Brophy's first joint prom with sister school Xavier in 1966

Brophy's Student Council, as well as over 90 student-led clubs and organizations, regularly coordinate activities that involve the entire student body. In 2008, 2009, and 2012 Brophy sent teams to the National Science Bowl competition. The basketball cheering section, known as the 6th Man, has been compared by Arizona sportswriters to the famous Cameron Crazies of Duke University. The school newspaper, The Roundup, was named the top high school newspaper in Arizona by the Arizona Newspapers Association in 2011 and 2012.

Similar to Yale University's residential college system, Brophy has eight different "houses" named after saints, Campion, Canisius, Claver, Faber, Gonzaga, Ignatius, Ricci, and Xavier that students are assigned to at the beginning of their freshman year. Throughout the year, teams compete for points to win the Team Cup and get a day off school. Teams may win points through a multitude of different ways such as donating the most money during the school's annual Turkey Drive, getting the highest attendance rates at the Fine Arts Extravaganza, or showing the most team spirit during the Homecoming Rally.

Brophy's athletic rivalry with Saint Mary's is intense in every sport in which they meet, coming to a climax each fall in the annual football meeting, which dates back to 1959.

Brophy runs a two-week annual event referred to as The Summit. During The Summit, which is modeled after those most often seen at colleges and universities, an issue that is particularly relevant is brought to students attention through workshop events and keynote speakers. Notable speakers that have spoken at these events include Sheriff Paul Penzone, American journalist Eugene Scott, Emmy Award winner and founder of the Free Radicals Project Christian Picciolini, and Jim Keady, an American activist known for his involvement in the Nike sweatshops investigation. Topics that have been showcased include human trafficking, racism, toxic masculinity, globalization, environmental issues, income inequality, and capital punishment.

== Notable alumni ==
- Mark Alarie (1982) – NBA basketball player
- Robert Grant (2014) – Track and field athlete
- Devon Allen (2013) – Track and Field Olympian (2016, 2020)
- Denzel Burke (transferred to Saguaro High School) – NFL cornerback
- Jaime Clarke (1989) – Novelist and editor
- Ryan Castellani (2014) – MLB baseball player
- Michael Collier (1971) – Poet and former Poet Laureate of Maryland
- Paris Dennard (2000) – Political commentator and communications strategist
- Mick Ebeling (1988) – Entrepreneur and inventor
- Devin Fitzgerald (2026) – College football wide receiver for the Notre Dame Fighting Irish
- Scott Garlick (1990) – MLS soccer player
- David Griffin (1987) – NBA executive
- Gary Hall Jr. (1993) – Olympic swimmer
- J. J. Jansen (2004) – NFL football player
- Glen Keane (1972) – Academy Award-winning animator
- Tim Kempton Jr. (2013) - Professional basketball player
- Cris Kirkwood (1978) – musician, co-founded Meat Puppets
- Curt Kirkwood (1976) – musician, co-founded Meat Puppets
- Bob Kohrs (1976) – NFL linebacker
- Drew Maggi (2008) – MLB baseball player
- Richard D. Mahoney (1969) – former Arizona Secretary of State
- Benjamin Morrison (2022) – NFL cornerback
- Michael Murphy (1956) – actor
- Trent Murphy (2009) – NFL defensive end
- Richard Noll (1977) – clinical psychologist and historian
- Sean O'Hair (2000) – PGA golfer
- Isaiah Oliver (2015) - NFL football player
- Ted Purdy (1992) – PGA golfer
- John Simons (1979) – Olympic swimmer
- Justin Speier (1991) – MLB baseball player
- Shawn Swayda (1992) – NFL defensive end
- E.J. Warner (2022) – college football quarterback
- Dana Wells (1985) – former NFL nose tackle
- Evan Whitfield (1995) – MLS soccer player
- Dean Winters (1982) – Actor
- Scott William Winters (1983) – actor
