= Tempt One =

American graffiti artist (1968/1969 – 2023)

Tempt1
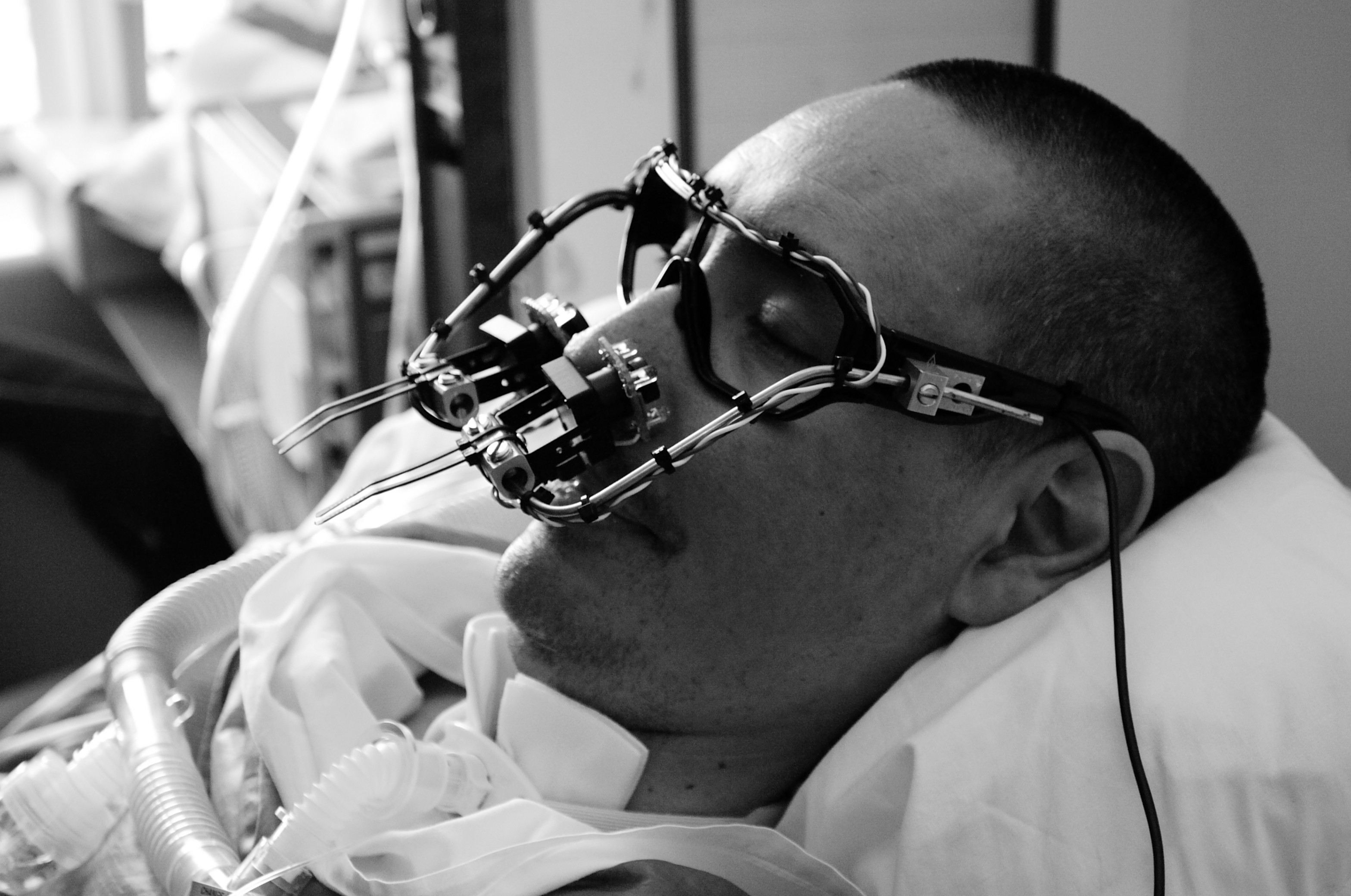
- Quan in 2009
- Born: Tony Quan; 1968 or 1969; United States
- Died: September 1, 2023 (aged 54)
- Other name: Tempt One
- Occupation: Graffiti artist
- Years active: Early 1980s – 2023
- Known for: Graffiti art
- Style: Cholo, Hip Hop

Tony Quan (1968/69 – September 1, 2023), better known by the tag name Tempt One or Tempt1, was an American graffiti artist who began painting graffiti in Los Angeles in the early 1980s.

== Style ==
Tempt's style combined the city's local cholo graffiti culture with New York's hip-hop lettering to create a unique "Los Angeles" style.

== Illness and death ==
In 2003, Tempt was diagnosed with the degenerative nerve disorder ALS. Fully paralyzed except for his eyes, he was able to use the EyeWriter to continue his art.

Tempt died on September 1, 2023, at the age of 54.
