= Frank Mohr Institute =

Founded in 1996, the Frank Mohr Institute is the Institute for Graduate Studies and Research in the Arts and Emerging Media of the Hanze University Groningen in the Netherlands. In cooperation with the University of Groningen, the institute accommodates three MFA (Master of Fine Arts) courses: Painting, Media Art and Design Technologies (MADTECH), and Scenography. The institute also provides an international programme of courses in the field of new media for university graduates, artists, designers, and participants from the business world. Notable artists include: Ottokaji Iroke, Kimball Holth, Salim Bayri, Kevin Alan Swenson, Paraskevi Frasiola, Anika Mariam Ahmed, Michiel Burger, Susanna Inglada, Lee McDonald and Luca Grimaldi.

== Frank Mohr ==
Frank Mohr (1931–1998) was a cultural advisor to the city and the province of Groningen and chairman of Academy Minerva and the Prins Claus Conservatory advisory boards, and was a fervent advocate of independence and innovation within art education in North Netherlands, and of deepening knowledge through collaboration between art and scientific education.
