= Free Art and Technology Lab =

Digital art collective

- The logo of FAT that used the NBC Peacock
- Established: 2007
- Location: San Francisco, Mexico City, New York City, Paris, London, Berlin, Amsterdam, Tokyo
- Website: fffff.at

The Free Art and Technology Lab (F.A.T. Lab) was a collective of artists, engineers, scientists, lawyers, and musicians, dedicated to the merging of popular culture with open source technology. F.A.T. Lab was known for producing artwork critical of traditional intellectual property law in the realm of new media art and technology. F.A.T. Lab has historically created work intended for the public domain, but has also released work under various open licenses. Their commitment is to support "open values and the public domain through the use of emerging open licenses, support for open entrepreneurship and the admonishment of secrecy, copyright monopolies and patents. F.A.T. Lab's mission has been approached through various methods of placing open ideals into the mainstream popular culture, including work with the New York Times, MTV, the front page of YouTube and in the Museum of Modern Art permanent collection."

== History ==
The F.A.T. Lab was founded in 2007 by Evan Roth and James Powderly also known for their work with the Graffiti Research Lab. Their logo features a recolored NBC peacock, the use of which they were apparently never challenged on. A large part of its membership consisted of research fellows, artist in resident or otherwise affiliated with the New York-based Eyebeam Art and Technology Center in 2005 to 2008. Most F.A.T. Lab members were based in North America as well as Central Europe and Asia. The F.A.T. Lab was fully international and Internet based. Due to the use of the Austrian country code top-level domain '.at' many people imply the origin of F.A.T. in Austria which is not the case. Connected through the Internet, its members cooperated on mostly digital and web-based art projects which are published on the F.A.T. website. Often its members published their own artistic works under the F.A.T. label.

F.A.T. Lab was nominated for the Transmediale Award 2010 at the media art festival Transmediale in Berlin.

On August 1, 2015, the F.A.T. Lab announced that it would be shutting down operations, with the F.A.T. website remaining online as an archive of its projects. The announcement stemmed from a consensus among its community that the war against the increased surveillance and commercialization of technology and the internet had been lost, a position articulated by Peter Sunde of Piratbyrån and The Pirate Bay at Transmediale. In a presentation entitled "We Lost" at F.A.T. GOLD at Gray Area Foundation for the Arts in San Francisco, members Magnus Eriksson and Evan Roth referenced both events, stating:

It would be unwise to predict ten years into the future again. But one thing is clear, tactics of the last 5 years whether legal, political, activist or artistic have resulted in little progress and have not kept up with the latest control measures. There's no use banging our heads against the wall anymore. Either your head will explode or they will simply open the door and let you in. Either way, no house will come crumbling down. It was as true in 2005 as when Peter says it in 2015. Let's face it, we lost, we all lost.

== Exhibitions ==
Selected exhibitions, workshops, screenings and performances include:

- 2015, Gray Area Foundation for the Arts, F.A.T. GOLD curated by Lindsay Howard, San Francisco, California
- 2013, MU Eindhoven, F.A.T. GOLD curated by Lindsay Howard, Eindhoven, The Netherlands
- 2013, Eyebeam, F.A.T. GOLD curated by Lindsay Howard, New York City, New York
- 2010, Transmediale FUTURITY NOW!, Berlin, Germany
- 2009, Netherlands Media Art Institute, Versions, Amsterdam, Netherlands
- 2009, Betahaus, Upgrade! Halloween edition, Berlin, Germany
- 2009, Pecha Kucha Berlin Vol. 14, Berlin Germany
- 2009, iMal, Openframeworks, Brussels, Belgium
- 2008, New Museum Rhizome Commissions 08, New York City, New York
- 2007, Gadgetoff, New York City, New York

== Projects ==
A QR Hobo Code, with a QR stencil generator, was released by the Free Art and Technology Lab in July 2011.

WifiTagger a project by member Addie Wagenknecht was released in 2012 by the Free Art and Technology Lab.
