= Graffiti Research Lab =

American artist group

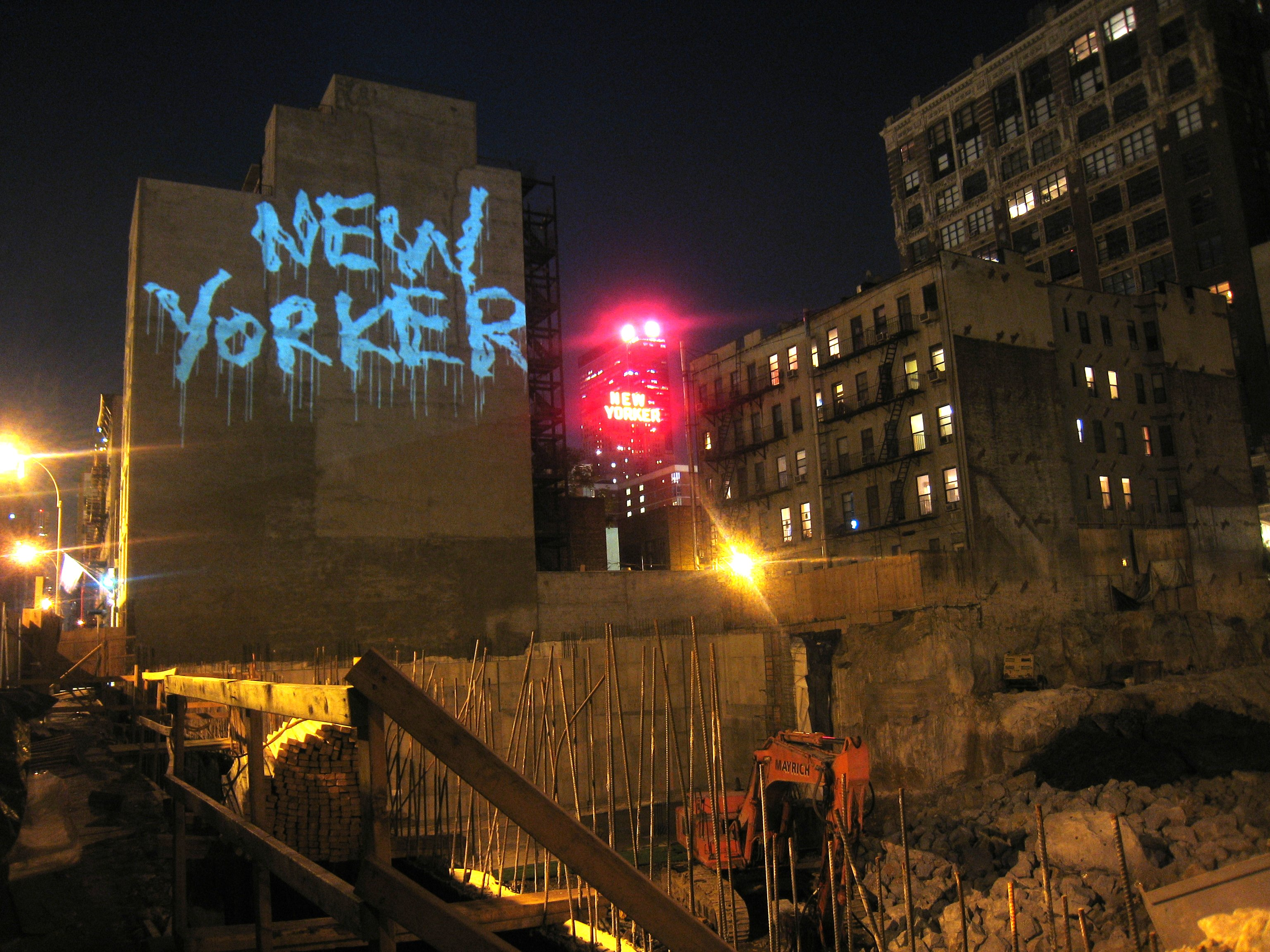
- Laser graffiti on a building in Hell's Kitchen, New York, 2007
- Born: Brooklyn, New York, United States
- Known for: Video, performance, new media art, street art, graffiti
- Notable work: L.A.S.E.R._Tag, LED throwies

Graffiti Research Lab is an art project founded by Evan Roth and James Powderly and run from Eyebeam OpenLab, a non-profit technology and art center where the two are fellows. The two experiment with LEDs, magnets, and conductive paint to augment street art and post instructions on their website. They pioneered "no mess" graffiti using LEDs.
