= LED art =

Form of light art

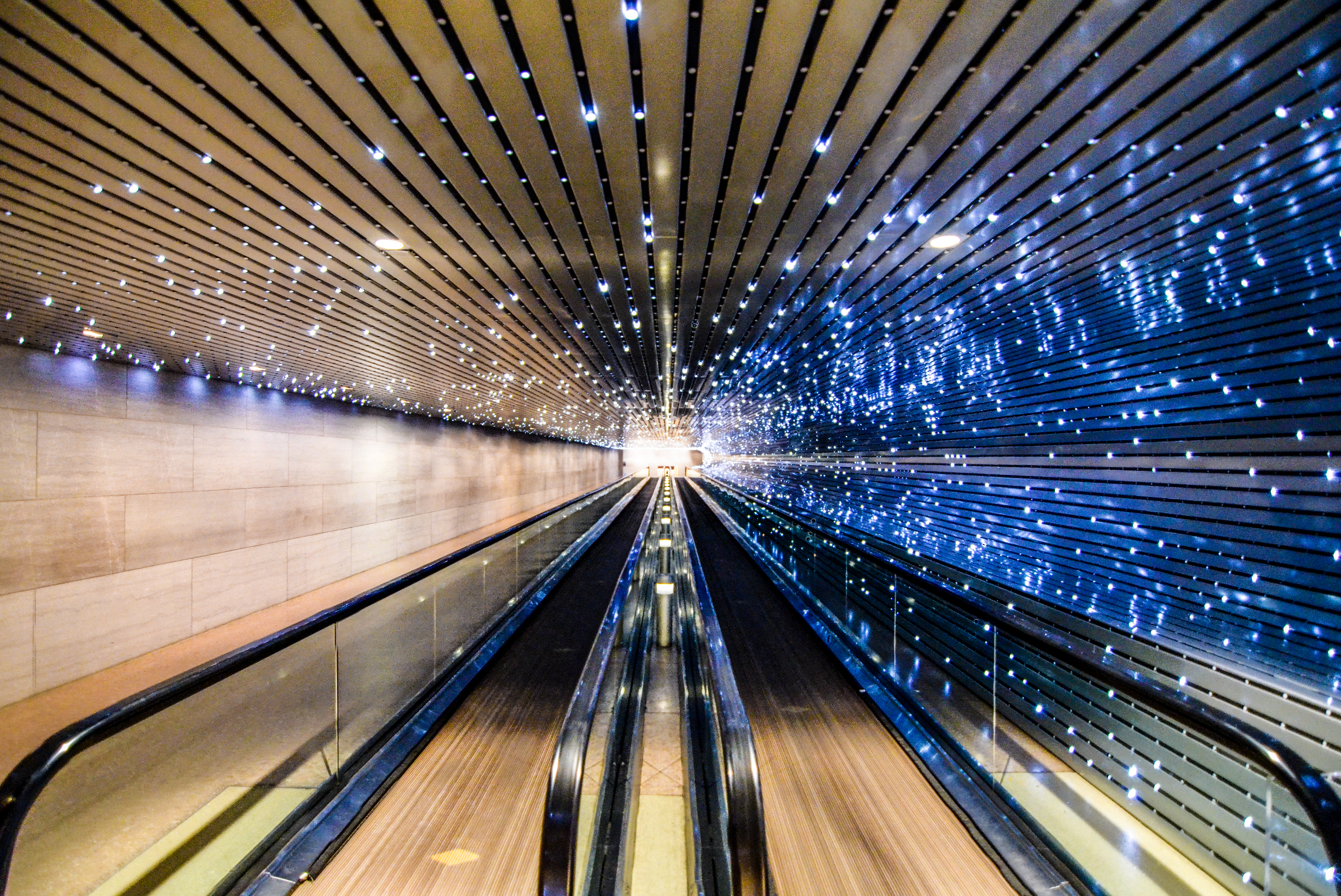
Multiverse, a 2008 LED artwork by Leo Villareal

LED art is a form of light art constructed from light-emitting diodes. LEDs (light emitting diodes) are very inexpensive to purchase and have become a new way to make street art. Many artists who use LEDs are guerrilla artists, incorporating LEDs to produce temporary pieces in public places. LEDs may be used in installation art, sculptural pieces and interactive artworks.

== Artists and works incorporating LEDs ==
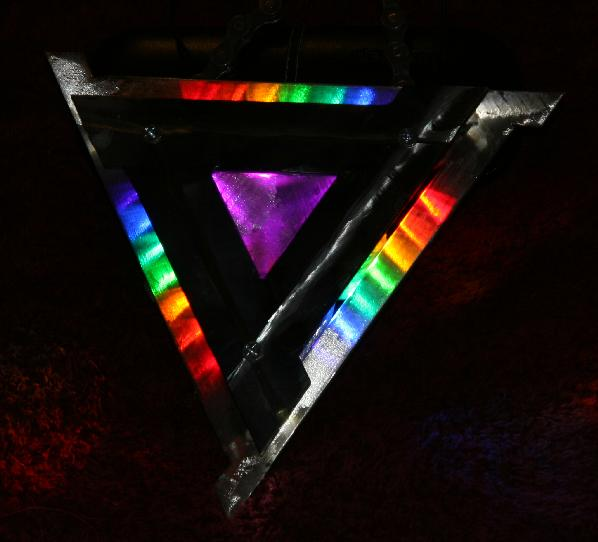
Sculpture in which LEDs are integrated within steel artwork

- Jenny Holzer - Neo-conceptual artist who incorporates LEDs into her work. She uses familiar statements and reinterprets them to alter their meanings.
- Grimanesa Amorós - Known for her large-scale LED light installations that use custom lighting sequences.
- Liz LaManche - creates large paintings illuminated by color-changing LED light for a motion effect
- Liu Dao - an art collective in China that uses actors and filmmakers to make animated LED portraits. The group also combines traditional Chinese arts like papercutting with LEDs to highlight China's journey from tradition and modernity, and is directed by Thomas Charvériat to find originality through international collaboration.
- Titia Ex - artist from Amsterdam who is known for her installation Flower of the Universe
- Leo Villareal - combines LED lights and encoded computer programming to create illuminated displays
- Mel and Dorothy Tanner - Creators of Lumonics, a multi-sensory art experience that features their LED-based sculptures, connected to a DMX lighting controller.

== Blinkies ==
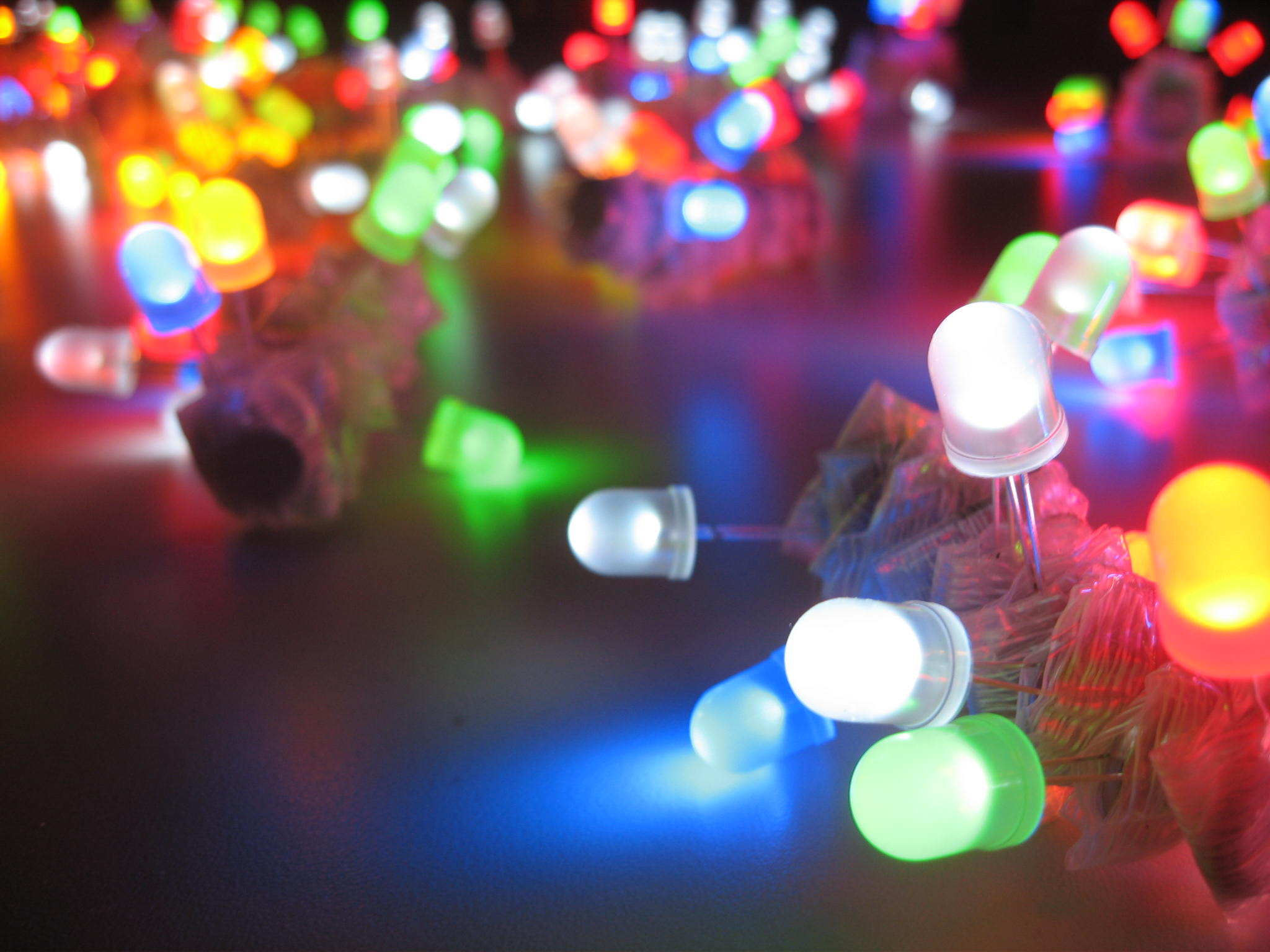
Homemade blinkies

Blinkies are small electronic devices that make very bright (usually flashing) light using LEDs and small batteries. They are often sold by vendors at night-time events that have fireworks displays such as Independence Day, Canada Day, or Guy Fawkes Night. They are also popular at raves, New Year's Eve parties and nighttime sporting events.

There is no industry standard or official name for blinkies, but most common names use some combination of the terms flash, magnet, strobe, body, blink, light, and/or jewelry. Common examples are blinkies, blinkees, body lights, blinky body lights, magnetic flashers, or flashing jewelry.

=== Uses ===
Blinkies are most often used for amusement at raves, parties and nighttime events. Their other uses include:

- Blinkies imprinted with company logos at conventions
- Safety lights for children during Halloween, or nighttime events
- Fun and safety during camping trips
- Emergency flashers for disabled automobiles or lost hikers (most blinkies have over a one-mile visibility range at night)
- The term blinky is often used for bicycle lights which flash. In some countries, blinkies can be used as a primary light on a bicycle.
- Blinkies also can be attached to mobiles (cell phones). When the mobile turns on, makes a call, or receives a call, the blinky will keep flashing.
- "Winky blinkies" can refer to stage and film props which display lighting effects, or "gags," during a dramatic production.

=== Construction ===
==== Body ====
A typical blinky is a small plastic two-piece cylinder wide enough to accept a button cell battery with a small etched circuit board on the face and threads on the open end, paired with a cylinder cap which screws on to seal and secure as one. The flashing LED circuit board face can be round and enclosed by the cylinder, or a variety larger colored shapes such as logos that are glued to the outside face of the cylinder end. Common designs utilize a rubber ring gasket as an on/off switch. When placed between the batteries and circuit board inside the front cover, tightening the screw base deforms and flattens the gasket forcing the battery tip to contact the back of the printed circuit board, which completes the circuit. Modern blinkees are more likely to use a battery case that opens with a small eyeglasses type screw and a push button on/off switch.

==== Back ====
The most common designs use a set of strong magnets, one at the back of the blinky, and another that can be removed. This allows the light to be easily attached to clothes, or stuck onto any magnetic metal such as buttons or belt buckles. Clips are often used to make earrings, a loop can make a pendant, or a ring can be welded to the back to make a finger ring. Double sided adhesive pads are sometimes used to stick the blinky directly to the body, most often in the navel.

==== Circuit board ====
The circuit board typically has anywhere from 2 to as many as 25 micro-LEDs. LEDs that emit different colors within the visible spectrum are commonly used, whereas ultraviolet or infrared LEDs are less common in blinkies. Blue, white, violet, and ultra-violet LEDs often require two or more battery cells, due to their higher voltage requirements. The visible side of the etched circuit board can be constructed to flash in a variety of ways, especially where there are multiple LEDs in multiple colours. A clear plastic conformal coating material such as silicone, acrylic or epoxy protects the fragile LEDs on the exposed front of the board. Shaped boards have literally hundreds of variations combined with imprinting. Common shapes (besides the classic small circle) are stars, hearts, flowers, flags, animals, holiday symbols (like Halloween jack-o-lanterns), and sports team logos.

== Guerilla marketing ==
In early 2007, there was a bomb scare in Boston, Massachusetts in the United States caused by a guerrilla marketing campaign. An advertising firm working for Cartoon Network to promote the network's animated television show Aqua Teen Hunger Force, hired two artists to produce art for the ad campaign. The artists placed LED signs in various locations across ten cities. However, Boston was the only city that reacted by shutting down bridges and bringing in bomb squads to remove the LEDs. The majority of the light boards were removed and the artists were arrested. Cartoon Network general manager Jim Samples resigned as a result of the incident.
