= Four Walls =

Four Walls or 4 Walls may refer to:

== Film and television ==
- Four Walls (film), a 1928 silent movie
- Four walls (filmmaking)
- "Four Walls" (Doctors), a 2003 television episode

== Music ==
- 4 Walls (album), 2015 album by f(x)
  - "4 Walls" (song), the album's title track
- Four Walls (artist forum), 1980s–1990s artists collaborative event space
- Four Walls, a 2000 Chris Shaffer album
- "Four Walls" (Jim Reeves song), 1957
- "Four Walls" (Broods song), 2014
- "Four Walls" / "Paradise Circus", a 2011 collaboration between Massive Attack and Burial
- "Four Walls", a song by Cast from All Change, 1995
- "Four Walls", a song by Cheyenne Kimball from the 2006 album The Day Has Come
  - Also covered by Miley Cyrus on the 2008 album Breakout
- "Four Walls", a song by While She Sleeps from the 2015 album Brainwashed
- "Four Walls", a song by Staind from the 1996 album Tormented

== See also ==
- The Fourth Wall (disambiguation)
- These Four Walls (disambiguation)
