= Claire Pentecost =

Claire Pentecost (born 1956 in Baltimore, Maryland, United States) is an American artist, a writer, and Professor in the Department of Photography at the School of the Art Institute of Chicago, Chicago, Illinois. Her interdisciplinary practice interrogates the imaginative and institutional structures that organize divisions of knowledge, often focusing on nature and artificiality. Her work positions artistic practice as a research practice, advocating for the role of the amateur in the collection, interpretation, and mobilization of information. Her current projects focus on industrial and bioengineered agriculture, and the hidden costs of the global corporate food system.

Pentecost engages diverse strategies—collaboration, research, teaching, field work, writing, lecturing, drawing, installation and photography—in an ongoing interrogation of the institutional structures that order knowledge. According to her model, the artist is someone who consents to learn in public, interrogating knowledge itself in the cultural space of art, a place where values are contested. She promotes crossing and disturbing the disciplinary boundaries that traditionally limit the authorized specialist.

== Collaboration ==
Pentecost often engages in collaborations with groups and individuals including Critical Art Ensemble, Beatriz da Costa, 16Beaver, Compass, Continental Drift, and Brian Holmes. In the early 1990s, Pentecost was one of a core group of organizers of Four Walls in Brooklyn.

== Career ==
Pentecost's artwork has been exhibited nationally and internationally including dOCUMENTA(13), Kassel, Germany. Invitations to speak include a Keynote Lecture at "Revolutions in Practice 2," the 2010 Creative Time Summit. Her artwork is represented by Higher Pictures, New York.

== Education ==
Pentecost attended The Westminster Schools, a Christian, independent day school for boys and girls in Atlanta, GA. In 1978 she earned a BA at Smith College, Northampton, MA. In 1983 she attended the Skowhegan School of Painting and Sculpture. In 1988 she earned an MFA, Pratt Institute, Brooklyn, NY. Pentecost was selected for the Whitney Independent Study Program 1988-89.

== Art works ==
- soil-erg
- victoryland
- the dream
- expochacra
- plastic dreamhouse by the sea
- grub

== Exhibitions (selections) ==
- 13th Istanbul Biennial (2013)
- dOCUMENTA13, Kassel, Germany, exhibiting artist (2012)
- "Vision is elastic. Thought is elastic." Murray Guy, NYC, NY (2011)
- "Interior Studies", Higher Pictures, NYC, NY (2010)
- "VictoryLand…you, I shall answer your letter" Three Walls, Chicago (2010)
- in collaboration with Compass: "Heartland", Smart Museum of Art, Chicago, IL (2009)
- "Natural Relations", Skuc Gallery, Ljubljana, Slovenia (2008)
- INOVA, Milwaukee (2008)
- "Mapping the Self", Museum of Contemporary Art, Chicago, IL (2007)
- "Calendar of flowers, gin bottles, steak bones", (Moyra Davey, Claire Pentecost, James Welling), Orchard, New York (2007)
- "Grub," The Suburban, Oak Park, IL (2006)
- VisibleFood, events exploring Chicago's alternative food systems, Mess Hall, Chicago (2005)
- Transmediale 05, Berlin (2005)
- "Proof, the Act of Seeing With One's Own Eyes" Australian Centre for the Moving Image, Melbourne, Australia (2004)
- "Nature Delivers: Urban Gardening and Beyond," Ukrainian Institute of Modern Art, Chicago, IL (2003)
- "Molecular Invasion." The Corcoran, Washington DC., in collaboration with Critical Art Ensemble and Beatriz da Costa (2002)
- "Private Rescue," Jean Albano Gallery, Chicago, Illinois (2001)
- "Millennium Fusion," ARC, Chicago, IL (2000)
- "House," 1755 West Division Street, Chicago, IL (1999)
- "Sentimental Rescue", The Wakeley Gallery, Illinois Wesleyan University, Bloomington, IL (1998)
- Elsbeth Woody Gallery, Clay Arts Center, Portchester, NY (1996)
- "Other Rooms", Ronald Feldman Gallery, New York, NY (1995)
- "The Jobs Show", Kunstverein, Munich, Germany (1994)
- Banff Center for the Arts, Banff, Canada (1993)
- "Arte Joven de Nueve York", Fundacion CELARG, Caracas, Venezuela (1991)
- Group Show, American Fine Art, New York, NY (1989)
- "Real Democracy", White Columns, New York, NY (1988)

== Awards ==
- 2017 Artadia Award
- 2014 Headlands Center for the Arts, Artist In Residence Program 2014, Chamberlain Awardee
- 2010 Nomination, 3Arts award
- 2009 Nomination, Anonymous Was a Woman award
- 2007 Nomination, Dreihaus Prize, The Richard Dreihaus Foundation, Chicago, IL
- 2004 Nomination, Dreihaus Prize, The Richard Dreihaus Foundation, Chicago, IL
- 2004 Bellagio Residency, Italy
- 2002 Public Art Commission, Canaryville Branch Library, Chicago Department of Cultural Affairs Illinois Arts Council Finalist Grant
- 1999 Invitational Request for Proposals on Biotechnology, Creative Time, New York
- 1996 Artist in Residence, Consultant, Avina Group, Mallorca, Spain
- 1993 Art Matters, artist Grant, New York, NY

== Speaking engagements ==
- 2012 Banff Research in Culture Residency
- 2012 dOCUMENTA(13); On Seeds and Multispecies Intra-Action: Disowning Life / Conversation between Josefina Hepp, Claire Pentecost, Amar Kanwar and Nalini Malani
- 2012 "The agricultural theatre: vernacular knowledge, sustainable development and gree imperialism," Musée du Quai Branly, Paris
- 2011 "Make It Better, a Symposium on Art, Design and the Future of Health Care," Rhode Island School of Design, Providence, RI
- 2010 Creative Time Summit
- 2010 Symposium on BioArt and BioPower, Humanities Institute, University of Illinois at Chicago, IL
- 2009 "The Politics of Perception," with Brian Holmes, Red Thread series, Platform Garanti Contemporary Art Center, Istanbul, Turkey
- 2008 "Raw Symbiosis: Animals-Nature-Culture," 14th International Festival of Contemporary Arts: City of Women Festival, Ljubljana, Slovenia
- 2007 Symposium: "BioMedicine and Aesthetics in a Museum Context," Medical Museion, Copenhagen, Denmark
- 2006 The Politics of Healthy Food, Café Society, Public Square at the Illinois Humanities Council, Chicago, IL
- 2005 Now Insert Utopia Here, "Big Problems" series, University of Chicago, Chicago
- 2004 "A Political Ecology of Bio-Commerce," Society for the Social Study of Science, Paris, France
- 2003 "How Next? A Seminar on the Future Role of Civil Society," Dag Hammarskjöld Foundation and the Research Foundation for Science, Technology and Ecology, Dehra Dun, India
- 2002 "Contestational Biology." Lecture, The Corcoran, Washington DC. (in collaboration with Critical Art Ensemble)
- 2001 Panel: "Why Make Art About Death?", Betty Rymer Gallery, Chicago, IL
- 2000 "A Little History of the Interior(ity), Consciousness Reframed III, Centre for Advanced Inquiry in the Interactive Arts, Newport, Wales
- 1998 Ox-Bow School of Arts and Crafts, visiting artist
- 1996 Yale School of Environmental Studies, Year-End Retreat, visiting artist
- 1994 Summeracademie, Kunstverein, Munich, Germany, visiting artist
- 1992 Out of the Box, lecture series, Center for Creative Photography, Tucson, AZ
- 1991 Artists and the Environment, Artists Talk on Art, New York, NY

== Authored texts ==
- Undoing property?; edited by Marysia Lewandowska, and Laurel Ptak; published Sternberg Press; 2013.
- Notes from the Underground: 100 Notes, 100 Thoughts: Documenta Series 061, Documenta (13); published Hatje Cantz; Bilingual edition; 2012.
- Deep routes: the midwest in all directions; published Compass Collaborators; 2012.
- Critical Strategies in Art and Media: Perspectives of New Cultural Practices; Konrad Becker, Jim Fleming (eds.); with: Ted Byfield/Nettime, Steve Kurtz/ Critical Art Ensemble, Amanda McDonald Crowley/Eyebeam Art and Technology Center, Claire Pentecost/Continental Drift, Peter Lamborn Wilson/Temporary Autonomous Zone; published Autonomedia, NY; 2010.
- "The Politics of Perception," with Brian Holmes, catalog essay, published 11th International Istanbul Biennial, Istanbul, Turkey; 2009.
- "Field of Zombies," essay published for the exhibition agriArt, Fine Arts Gallery at George Mason University; 2009.
- Talking With Your Mouth Full: New language for socially engaged art: essays by Lori Waxman, Claire Pentecost & Carrie Lambert-Beatty; edited by Elizabeth Chodos; published Green Lantern; 2008.
- Tactical biopolitics: art, activism, and technoscience; edited by Beatriz da Costa and Kavita Philip; with a foreword by Joseph Dumit; published MIT Press, 2008.
- "When Art Becomes Life: Artist-Researchers and Biotechnology," Transversal, Multilingual Web Journal, European Institute for Progressive Cultural Policies; 2007.
- Participatory Autonomy; edited by Rebecca Sullivan; with foreword by Hannah Higgins; published UIC School of Art and Design; 2006.
- "Reflections on the Case by the U.S. Justice Department against Steve Kurtz and Robert Ferrell;" published Marching Plague, Autonomedia Press; 2006
- "Of Patriots and Profits: New Tools for Keeping Academic Research in Line;" with Beatriz DaCosta; published Radical History Review; 2005
- Catalogue essay, "Proof, the Act of Seeing With One's Own Eyes;" published Australian Centre for the Moving Image, Melbourne; 2005
- "What Did You Eat and When Did You Know It?" published Art Journal, Fall Issue; 2002
- Researched, wrote & designed "Al'queria, History, Present, Vision," published Avina Group, Mallorca, Sp; 1997
- Review of the new Museum of the American Indian, World Art, Fall 1995
- "Four Walls: Ten Years," Documents, Spring Issue 1994
- Catalogue essay: "What Charlie Troutman Said," The Mayfair Show, The Mayfair Club in coordination with American Fine Art, New York, NY 1993

== Published images ==
- Blindspot, Issue 43; 2011.
- Useful pictures, edited by Adelheid Mers; published Whitewalls; 2008.
- American Girl Place (photographs), published Domain Errors, Autonomedia, New York, NY; 2002.

== Interviews ==
- Spirit of Utopia, White Chapel Gallery, 2013.
- art21.org, 2012
- Bad at Sports: Episode 34, 2006

== Bibliography ==
- Cotter, Holland. “CLAIRE PENTECOST: Interior Studies,” The New York Times, December 2, 2010
- The New York Times; New York Magazine; Haberarts; Art & Text.
