= Jason Simon =

Jason Simon may refer to:

- Jason Simon (artist) (born 1961), American artist
- Jason Simon (ice hockey) (born 1969), Canadian former professional ice hockey player

== See also ==
- Jason Simmons (born 1976), an American football coach and former safety
