= Elstree Studios (Shenley Road) =

Film and TV production facility in England

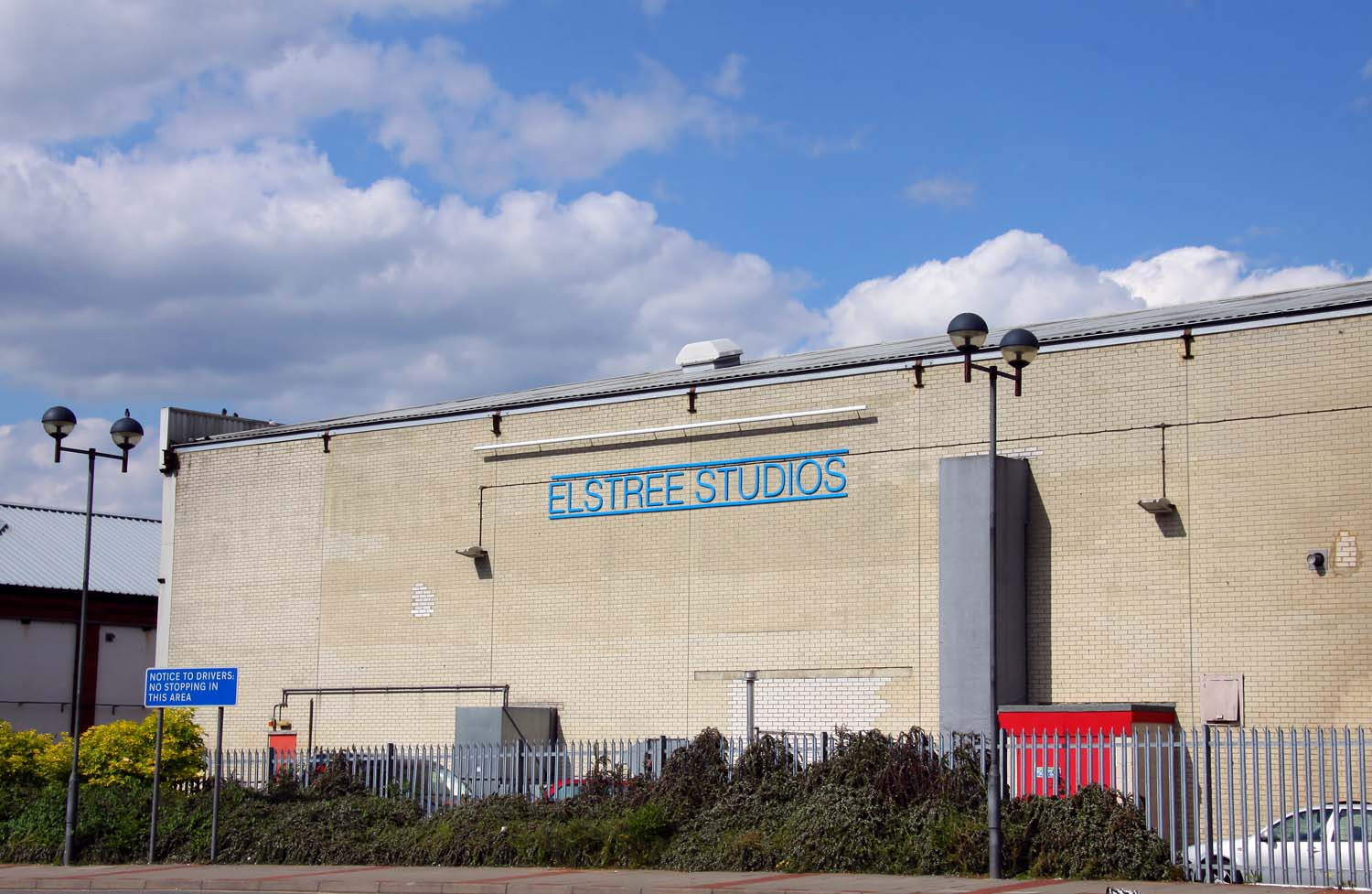
- Elstree Studios as viewed from the south-west, May 2010
- Former names: British National Pictures Studios; British International Pictures (BIP) Studios; Associated British Studios; EMI-Elstree Studios; EMI-MGM Elstree Studios; Thorn-EMI Elstree Studios; Goldcrest Elstree Studios; Cannon Elstree Studios
- Alternative names: Elstree Film and TV Studios

General information
- Type: Film and television studios
- Location: Shenley Road, Borehamwood, Hertfordshire, WD6 1JG, United Kingdom
- Coordinates: 51.6581°N 0.2691°W
- Current tenants: Elstree Film Studios Limited
- Construction started: 1925
- Owner: British National Pictures (1925–1927); British International Pictures (1927–1933); Associated British Picture Corporation (1933–1969); EMI Films (1969–1979); Thorn EMI Screen Entertainment (1979–1986); Cannon Films (1986–1988); Brent Walker (1988–1996); Hertsmere Borough Council (1996–present)

Website
- www.elstreestudios.co.uk

Elstree Studios on Shenley Road, Borehamwood, Hertfordshire is a British film and television production centre operated by Elstree Film Studios Limited. One of several facilities historically referred to as Elstree Studios, the Shenley Road studios originally opened in 1926.

The studio complex has passed through many owners during its lifetime, and is now owned by Hertsmere Borough Council. Known as the studios used for filming Alfred Hitchcock's Blackmail (1929)—the first British talkie, the Star Wars original trilogy (1977–1983), The Shining (1980) and Indiana Jones, its largest stage is known as the George Lucas Soundstage 2 (15,770 sq ft), with the studios used both for film and television productions.

With the BBC Elstree Centre nearby, a number of the stages are leased to BBC Studioworks, and are used for recording television productions such as Strictly Come Dancing.

== History ==
=== British International and Associated British ===
British National Pictures Ltd purchased 40 acres (16 ha) of land on the south side of Shenley Road and began construction of two large film stages in 1925. After a year of construction the studio officially opened on 29 December 1926. After discord among the partners, which by this time included Herbert Wilcox, their solicitor John Maxwell invested and was able to gain control of the company. The first film produced there was Madame Pompadour (1927).

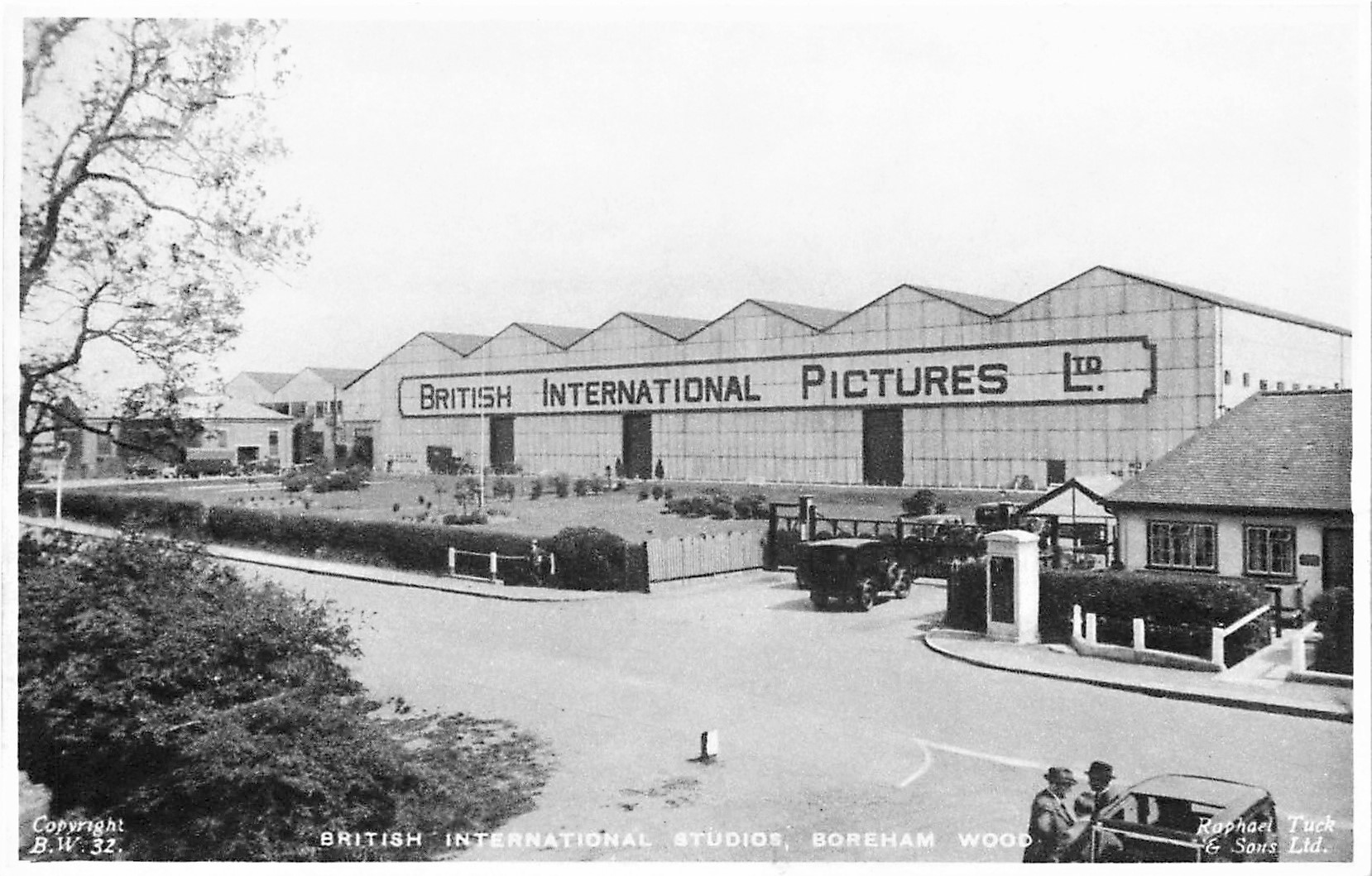
British International Pictures Studios, about 1936

By 1927, Maxwell controlled all the stock, and the company was renamed British International Pictures (BIP) and the second stage was ready for production in 1928. Maxwell placed Alfred Hitchcock under contract in a 3-year, 12-picture deal, and after several silents, he was responsible for Blackmail (1929), the first British talkie released, which was produced at the studios. At the end of the silent-film era, six new sound stages were built; three of these were sold to the British & Dominions Film Corporation with BIP retaining the remaining stages. Elstree Calling (1930), made by BIP, was reputedly Britain's first musical film.

BIP became Associated British Picture Corporation (ABPC) in 1933, although the BIP name continued to be used for some purposes until 31 March 1937. Maxwell died in 1940 and during World War II, the studios were used by the War Office for storage.

In 1946, Warner Brothers acquired a 25% interest in ABPC, appointed a new board and decided to rebuild the stages. This was completed in 1948 and work began on Man on the Run followed by The Hasty Heart starring Richard Todd and Ronald Reagan.

The Shenley Road studios were frequently used in the 1960s for productions on film for ABPC's television arm, ABC Weekend TV. Later episodes of The Avengers were among these (which were credited to "ABC Television Films Ltd, Associated British Elstree Studios"). Several similar productions by ITC for ATV were also filmed there, including The Saint, The Baron, Department S and The Champions. All of these series made extensive use of a townscape standing set constructed at the rear of the studio site, originally for the 1961 Cliff Richard film The Young Ones.

=== EMI and others ===
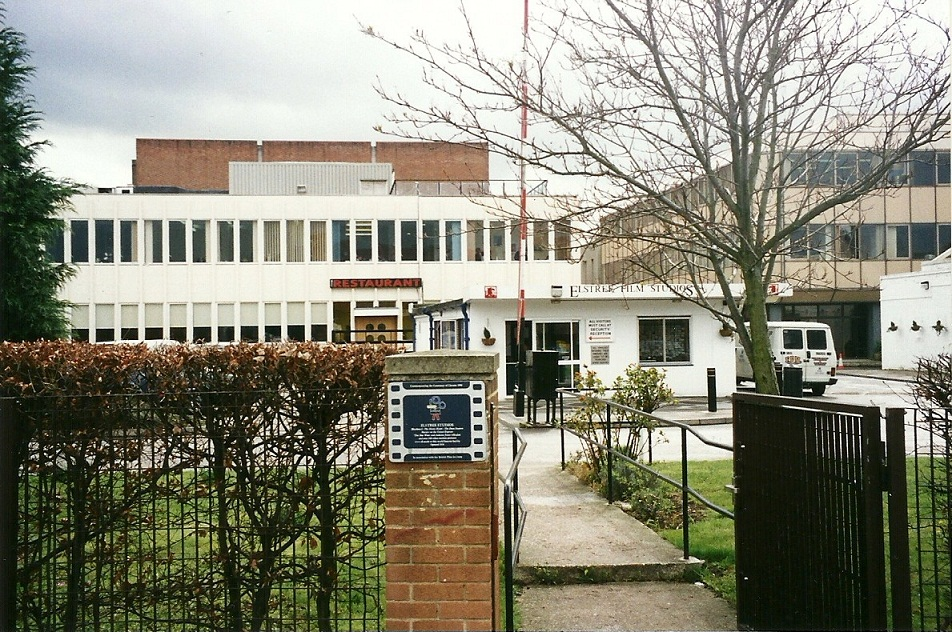
The Main Gate entrance at Shenley Road (late 1990s).

In 1969, Electric and Musical Industries (EMI) finally gained control of ABPC and the studios were renamed EMI-Elstree Studios.

In 1969, Bryan Forbes was appointed head of production of the film studio (see EMI Films). Dennis Barker, in his obituary of Forbes for The Guardian, states that "This amounted virtually to an attempt to revive the ailing British film industry by instituting a traditional studio system with a whole slate of films in play." Under Forbes's leadership, the studio produced The Railway Children (1970), The Tales of Beatrix Potter (1971) and The Go-Between (1971), all successful films. His tenure though, was short-lived and marked by financial problems, brought about by deliberately withheld funding and failed projects. Forbes resigned in 1971. In his autobiography A Divided Life he states that "They were years of high hopes, of excitement, often of fulfilment and contrary to what various pundits said after the event, the programme proved a commercial success, returning according to the latest [1992] figures a profit in excess of £16,000,000 on a capital outlay of £4,000,000." During the period 1970–73, EMI had a short-lived production and distribution deal with the American Metro-Goldwyn-Mayer studio, after the closure of their MGM-British Studios in Elstree. During this period the facilities were known as the EMI-MGM Elstree Studios.

In 1974, Andrew Mitchell took over from Ian Scott as managing director of the studios, but was almost immediately told to close the facility and lay off all the staff. Due to the sterling efforts of Mitchell and the help of John Reed, who was on the board of EMI, and Alan Sapper, the head of the ACTT Union, Mitchell turned the studios into a four-wall facility, which effectively meant reducing the staff to administration, with the exception of the dubbing facility and having freelance crew being brought in by each production company. This was inevitable, due to the changing nature of cinematic styles that relied increasingly on location shooting and the reduced financial involvement of EMI in its own film productions, thus rendering a permanent production staff employed full-time at the facility redundant.

Films shot at the facility over the next few years included the Agatha Christie mystery film Murder on the Orient Express (1974), directed by Sidney Lumet; Ken Russell's Valentino (1977; Stanley Kubrick's The Shining (1980); Fred Zinnemann's drama film Julia (1977); and most significantly for the studio's immediate survival, through a deal brokered by Andrew Mitchell, George Lucas with Star Wars (1977). This led to subsequent Lucas productions such as the Star Wars sequels and Indiana Jones franchise being made at Elstree, and also brought in directors Steven Spielberg and Jim Henson. This was the golden era of the construction picture, which essentially required large studio facilities to fulfill the filmmakers' vision, before computer-generated imagery technology and Elstree became synonymous with this kind of picture due to the success of the Star Wars and Indiana Jones films.

In 1979, Thorn Electrical Industries merged with EMI after EMI's debacle with its invention of the CT Scanner, and the studios were renamed Thorn-EMI Elstree Studios.

=== Sale, partial demolition, and present ===
The studios were put up for sale in 1985. A management team beat off all other prospective buyers with the help of Alan Bond but the team had difficulty raising their share of the purchase price and Bond took over. Soon afterwards he sold the studios to the Herron-Cannon Group in 1986. In 1987, Weintraub Entertainment Group attempted to buy the studios, but the deal collapsed. In June 1988, Cannon sold the studios to a consortium of property developers formed by merchant bank Tranwood Earl. Following industry concerns over the plans of the property developers, the leisure and property company Brent Walker plc formed a joint venture with Tranwood Earl two months later and acquired the site from the consortium for £32.5 million. A month later, Brent Walker bought out Tranwood Earl, proposing to retain seven of the ten soundstages and post-production units. Much of the backlot was sold off and demolished, with a Tesco supermarket being built on the land.

The Elstree Studios facility hosts some historic soundstages.

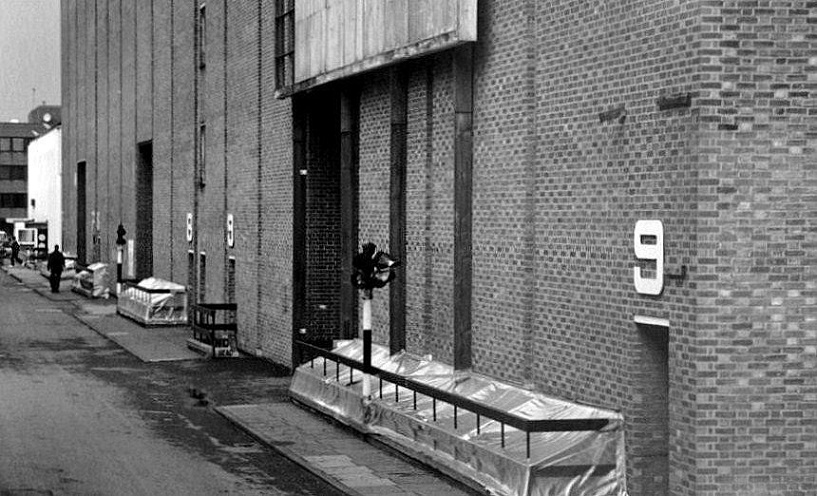
Stages at Elstree Studios.

A "Save Our Studios" campaign was launched in 1988 by managing director, Andrew Mitchell, local Town Councillor and studio historian Paul Welsh, with the support of many film actors and the general public. Hertsmere Borough Council stepped in and bought the remaining facilities in February 1996 and appointed a management company, Elstree Film & Television Studios Ltd., to run the studios in 2000. The purchase ended an eight-year struggle that was due to have culminated in High Court action. Brent Walker's offer to sell the site to the council, for an undisclosed sum (but no more than its worth as a film studio), represented a victory for the local authority in upholding the planning agreements that protected the studios.

The studios are now most commonly known for being the home of Who Wants to Be a Millionaire? and the Big Brother house (previously at Three Mills Studios in Bow, East London). The Big Brother house was actually built on top of the studios' old underwater stage where scenes in The Dam Busters (1955) and Moby-Dick (1956) were filmed. Elstree Film & Television Studios Ltd's lease expired at the end of March 2007.

It was announced in 2012 that the studios would be the temporary home of BBC Studios and Post Production during the redevelopment of Television Centre. Shows such as Strictly Come Dancing and Pointless were based on the site from spring 2013. The original plan was for the BBC to move back to refurbished Television Centre studios in 2015, however due to delays in the broader redevelopment of the old Television Centre site in July 2014, the lease was extended until 2017.

Elstree Studios are now operated by Elstree Film Studios Ltd, a company controlled by Hertsmere Borough Council. Feature film production continues alongside television production, commercials and pop promos; recent productions include 44 Inch Chest, Bright Star, 1408, Son of Rambow, Amazing Grace, The Other Boleyn Girl, Notes on a Scandal, Breaking and Entering, Flyboys, Hitchhiker's Guide to the Galaxy, Star Wars: Episode II – Attack of the Clones and Star Wars: Episode III – Revenge of the Sith, Dancing on Ice and Are You Smarter Than A 10 Year Old? for Sky television among many others.

On 25 November 2019 it was announced that Elstree Studios would continue with their partnership with BBC Studioworks to provide television studio facilities. The arrangement will see the use of stages by the BBC continue until at least March 2024.

In December 2023, owners Hertsmere Borough Council were granted permission to demolish Sound Stages 7, 8 and 9, by their planning committee.

== See also ==
- Category:Films shot at British International Pictures Studios (1925–1937)
- Category:Films shot at Associated British Studios (1937–1970)
- Category:Films shot at EMI-Elstree Studios (1970–1996)
- Category:Films shot at Elstree Film Studios (since 1996)
- Category:Television shows shot at Associated British Studios (until 1970)
- Category:Television shows shot at EMI-Elstree Studios (1970–1996)
- Category:Television shows shot at Elstree Film Studios (since 1996)

== Sources ==
- Leslie Banks, The Elstree Story: Twenty-One Years of Film-Making. Clerke and Cockeran. 88 pages. With contributions by Douglas Fairbanks, Alfred Hitchcock, Ralph Richardson, Victory Saville, Googie Withers, Anna Neagle and John Mills.
- Castle, Stephen; Brooks, William (1988). The Book of Elstree & Boreham Wood. Buckingham, England: Barracuda Books Ltd. ISBN 978-0-86023-406-7.
- Peecher, John Phillip (1983) The Making of Star Wars: Return of the Jedi. Ballantine Books. ISBN 0-345-31235-X.
- Warren, Patricia (1983). Elstree: The British Hollywood. Columbus Books: London, ISBN 0-86287-446-7.
- Warren, Patricia, (1983). British Film Studios: An Illustrated History. Batsford. ISBN 0-7134-8644-9.
- Welsh, Paul (1996). Elstree Film & Television Festival Programme. Elstree and Borehamwood Town Council.
