= Mary Mattingly =

American artist (born 1978)

- Mary Mattingly at Port of New Jersey Owning Up to her possessions in NY Close Up Art 21
- Born: Mary Mattingly; September 8, 1978 (age 48); Rockville, Connecticut
- Notable work: Waterpod (2006–10)
- Awards: NYFA Fellowship, EYEBEAM Fellowship, Harpo Foundation Grant, Jerome Foundation Grant, Art Matters Grant, Yale School of Art Fellowship, Knight Foundation Grant, Marie Walsh Sharpe Residency, smArt Power Award, Bemis Center for Contemporary Arts Residency
- Website: Official website

Mary Mattingly (born September 8, 1978) is an American visual artist living and working in New York City. She is the recipient of a Yale University School of Art Fellowship, and was a resident at Eyebeam Art and Technology Center from 2011 to 2012.

== Early life and education ==
Mattingly was born in Rockville, Connecticut in 1978. She has studied at Parsons School of Design in New York, and received her Bachelor of Fine Arts (BFA) from Pacific Northwest College of Art in Portland, Oregon in 2002.

== Work ==
Mattingly explores the themes of home, travel, cartography, and humans' relationships with each other, with the environment, with machines, and with corporate and political entities. She has been recognized for creating photographs and sculptures depicting and representing futuristic and obscure landscapes, for making wearable sculpture, "wearable homes," and for her ecological installations, including the Waterpod (2009).

=== Wearable Home (2004–06) ===
In this expansive series of photographs, Mattingly portrays scenes from a post-apocalyptic world where nomadic individuals survive with the help of wearable technology. Mattingly envisions a future where technology has "made people separate, even afraid of others". The wearable homes are meant to convey notions of home and sustainability, but also to address specific survival issues like finding water and temperature regulation. While the images resemble science fiction scenes, Mattingly designs the suits for actual treks through the wilderness and was even commissioned to design a survival kit for the disaster-relief company Black Umbrella.

=== Opera (2006) ===
In December 2006, she released a multimedia opera at White Box in New York titled Fore Cast. Fore Cast was positioned as an environmental disaster opera and featured an art installation with music and performances depicting World War IV which was predicted by Albert Einstein:

"I don't know what World War III will be fought with, but I know World War IV will be fought with sticks and stones."

The gallery was filled with water, sand, and tree stumps with a circular projection that covered the space.

=== Waterpod (2009) ===
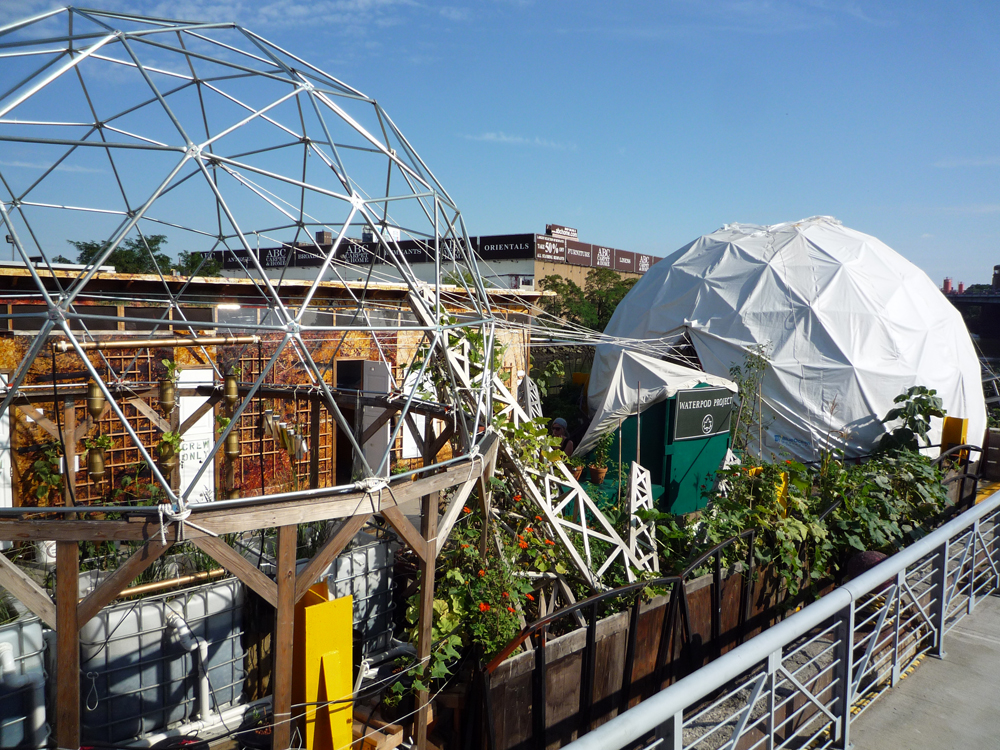
The Waterpod barge in New York City

From June through September 2009, Mattingly led a NY-based multinational team of artists, designers, builders, civic activists, scientists, environmentalists, and marine engineers to launch the Waterpod, a free, participatory New York Citywide event docking in all 5 boroughs and at Governors Island. Designed as a new habitat for the global warming epoch, the Waterpod represented a sustainable, sculptural art and technology habitat, with as many as four artists living on and off it, generating food, water, and power in a contained and self-sufficient environment.

While focusing on collaborative artistic projects, the resident artists emphasized the repurposing and transformation of all forms of materials. The Waterpod included space for: (i) community and artistic activities; (ii) eco-initiatives including food grown with collected rainwater, and gray water recycling, with energy provided from environmental and human sources; and (iii) an artists' residence. A critical intent of the Waterpod was to showcase the importance of water and the natural world, while serving as a model of an autonomous living system.

Mattingly says she was inspired to create Waterpod in 2006 because at the time she felt that NYC was not doing enough to bring attention to rising water levels. Over the life of the project a rotating cast of artist joined the crew of the Waterpod. A number of them were interviewed about the project, and reported that life on the boat forced a shift in focus onto everything it takes to keep a fragile, man-made ecosystem running.

=== Flock House (2012) ===
Flock House premiered in May 2012 at The Clocktower Gallery in NYC, and is an extension of previous projects to do with water, nomadic structures, and sustainability such as her Waterpod project from 2009. The project featured a series of four portable, self-sufficient ecosystems built with reclaimed materials and installed at temporary sites across the five boroughs of New York City. The structures are meant to be demonstrate the possibilities of small scale systems and run off a combination of passive and human-powered energy, and include human-scale gardens and systems for collecting water from rain run-off.

Following the May 2012 premier, the migratory structures traveled the New York City park system between June and August 2012, appearing in places such as Flushing Meadows Corona Park, Battery Park, and the Snug Harbor. During each installation of the work, and different person lived within the structure for the duration, sometimes for as long as two weeks at a time. Participating people include Christopher Robbins from Ghana ThinkTank, Greg Lindquist, and Amelia Marzac. The Flock Houses also traveled to Bronx Museum, the Maiden Lane Exhibition Space, and Omi Sculpture Park in Ghent, NY.

After the initial run in NYC, Flock House travelled to other cities, including a commission for the Bemis Center in Oklahoma from March–September 2014. Additionally, it was the focal point of an exhibition at College of Fine Arts School of Visual Arts at Boston University's 808 Gallery.

Mary Mattingly's Flock House Project: Omaha, a citywide workshop and exhibition curated by Amanda McDonald Crowley, was developed while she was a resident at the Bemis Center for Contemporary Art, in Omaha, Nebraska. Inspired by patterns of global human migration and pilgrimage, the Flock House Project is a group of mobile, sculptural, public habitats and self-contained ecosystems that are movable, modular, and scalable. It debuted in Omaha on March 13, 2014, the exhibition included selected works from her Island, Anatomy of Melancholy, Second Nature, Nomadographies, House and Universe; and Wearable Portable Architecture works, and her works for her Tools series made at the Bemis Center. The centerpiece for the exhibition was one of the three portable structures.

=== smArt Power Project, Manila, Philippines (2012) ===
In 2012 she was a part of the smARTpower project, "Wearable/Portable Architecture project", and worked with Green Papaya Art Space in Manila, the Philippines, initiated by the US Department of State and the Bronx Museum. The project discussed the possibilities of having a locale create portable architecture based on the conditions of its environmental, urban and cultural conditions. It was organized to find ways in providing new arguments and sustaining an artistic impetus to our immediate environment. It addresses the timely issues of flooding and mobility, engaging participants to come up with designs that would respond to current environmental disasters and if portable architecture is applicable in our urban landscape.

=== WetLand (2014) ===
From August 15- Sept 17, 2014 on the Delaware River, WetLand was a mobile, sculptural habitat and public space constructed to explore resource interdependency and climate change in urban centers. A floating sculpture, it resembles a partially submerged building, integrating nature with urban space. Narrating a watery urban ecotopia, the interior contains a living space, work space, and performance space, it combines art, architecture, and ecology. WetLand's overall ecosystem includes rainwater collection and purification, greywater filtration, dry compost systems, outdoor vegetable gardens, indoor hydroponic gardens, and railing gardens circling the perimeter.

=== Swale (2015–ongoing) ===
Swale is a floating food forest situated on a 130-foot by 140-foot barge that docks in harbors around NYC. It is part art installation, part community engagement project, and was launched during July 2016 after a year of planning and building in collaboration with numerous community groups. After receiving initial seed funding from A Blade of Grass as part of a fellowship, Mary Mattingly and her team, including curator Amanda McDonald Crowley, launched a Kickstarter campaign to raise additional funds and awareness during May 2016 where they raised $32,523 from 333 people.

The inspiration for Swale came after Mattingly learned that is generally illegal to grow food on public land. By utilizing marine law, Swale Park avoids facing repercussions of land-based laws by growing publicly accessible gardens on a floating barge rather than a plot of land.

Following the studies of social scientist Elinor Ostrom, Swale's construction bases itself around the concept of sustainably managing Commons. With no limit to foraging, Swale Park aims to act as a source of provision while encouraging mutual trust and responsibility between participants. The food gardens on Swale include vegetables like broccoli and kale and also fruits like tomatoes and plums, and can be harvested for free distribution via community partners. During summer 2016, Swale docked in the Bronx at Concrete Plant Park, Brooklyn Bridge Park and Governors Island. The Bronx is one of the largest food deserts in the United States. So, the creation and launch of Swale Park in this area act as a literal and figurative platform to discuss the necessity of universal food accessibility.

Additionally, Swale functions as a community hub for events, scientific research, public discussions, and workshops, developed in collaboration with local communities and stewardship groups.

Currently, under renovations, Swale Park is set to become a permanent floating park in 2022.

== Exhibitions and awards ==
Her work has been shown at: the International Center of Photography, New York; the Palais de Tokyo, Paris; the Centre Culturel Calouste Gulbenkian, Paris; the Neuberger Museum of Art, Purchase, NY; the New York Public Library; the Fairfield University Art Museum, CT; and in exhibitions in Germany, Greece, the Netherlands, Great Britain, Italy, and Dubai.

She has had one-person exhibitions at: Robert Mann Gallery, New York; White Box, New York; Galerie Adler, Frankfurt, Germany, The New School, New York, Bemis Center for Contemporary Art, Omaha, Nebraska, and other exhibition spaces. In September 2006, the artist's piece titled "The New Mobility of Home" was the cover image of the International Center of Photography's Triennial titled "Ecotopia."

Mattingly was selected as a shortlist finalist in the inaugural Prix Pictet global environmental photography competition (2008). She has been awarded artist-residency grants at: New York University; Lower Manhattan Cultural Council, New York City; Braziers International, Oxfordshire, England; and Yale Summer School of Music and Art, Norfolk, CT. Mattingly was an Eyebeam Fellow from 2011 to 2012.

== Media coverage ==
Mattingly's work has been featured in The New York Times, The New Yorker, Le Monde Magazine, Financial Times, Nature Magazine, Time Out New York, New York Magazine, The New York Press, Artforum, Esquire Magazine, Frankfurter Rundschau, and The New York Daily News.

Televised coverage of Mattingly's work has appeared on BBC News, WNBC, MSNBC, New York 1, Fox News, Art 21: New York Close-up.
