= Beatriz da Costa =

German-born American interdisciplinary artist

- Where 2.0, San Jose, 2007
- Born: June 11, 1974; Berlin, Germany
- Died: December 27, 2012 (aged 38); New York City, U.S.A.

Laura Gabriela Beatriz Noronha da Costa (June 11, 1974 – December 27, 2012) was an interdisciplinary artist known for her work at the intersection of contemporary art, science, engineering, and politics. Her projects took the form of public interventions and workshops, conceptual tool building, and critical writing.

== Early life and education ==
Laura Gabriela Beatriz Noronha da Costa (Beatriz da Costa) was born in Berlin, Germany. Raised and educated in Ahrensburg in northern Germany, da Costa moved to southern France in 1995 to study art at the École supérieure d’art, Aix-en-Provence, and in 1999 came to the United States, where she became a graduate student at Carnegie Mellon University. While at CMU, da Costa served as both an associate researcher and courtesy faculty.

After graduating in 2001, she taught briefly at Chatham College and as a visiting assistant professor at the State University of New York in Buffalo. In 2003 she took a joint appointment as assistant professor in the Department of Studio Art and the Department of Electrical Engineering and Computer Science at the University of California, Irvine.

Da Costa was brought to UC Irvine as a founding member of the Arts Computation, Engineering (ACE) graduate program, an interdisciplinary program housed between the schools of engineering, computer science, and arts. She was also affiliate faculty in the Informatics Department, as well as in the Culture and Theory Ph.D. program. In 2007, after receiving tenure at UC Irvine, she began work on a Ph.D. in the History of Consciousness program at UC Santa Cruz, where the feminist scholar Donna Haraway was her chief mentor.

Da Costa battled cancer several times during her life, first at the age of 14 and then again when her cancer recurred at 19 and 21. In 2009, Da Costa was diagnosed with stage IV metastatic breast cancer, which she fought until dying on December 27, 2012.

== Career ==
Beatriz da Costa was a co-founder with Jamie Schulte and Brooke Singer of Preemptive Media, and a former collaborator of Critical Art Ensemble (CAE). She also created work on her own, with a special interest in the intersections of art, science, engineering, and politics. Da Costa's artwork took whatever form served it best, including robotics, micro-electronics, installation, sculpture, performance, interactivity, net art, photography, and video. She experimented with the use of biological materials and organisms in her artistic interventions and was intent on using these interspecies projects to promote the responsible use of natural resources and environmental sustainability. Da Costa and her collaborators frequently engaged the public by running workshops that translated challenging new technical and scientific developments into something accessible to a more general public.

Some of her better-known projects include Swipe, Zapped, and Air (Preemptive Media); Molecular Invasion, Free Range Grains, GenTerra (CAE), and Pigeonblog. Da Costa exhibited at venues including dOCUMENTA (13), Eyebeam (New York), the Andy Warhol Museum, the Centro Andaluz de Arte Contemporáneo in Sevilla (Spain), the Zentrum für Kunst und Medien (Germany), the Museum of Contemporary Art, (Serbia), Exit Art Gallery (New York), Cornerhouse (Manchester, UK), A Foundation (London, UK), Saidye Bronfman Centre for the Arts (Montreal), John Hansard Gallery (Southampton, UK, and the Natural History Museum, London.

Writing was also an important part of her practice, and she co-edited the 2008 MIT Press anthology Tactical Biopolitics: Art, Activism, and Technoscience with former UC Irvine professor of history Kavita Philip.

Da Costa continued to work up until her death, producing a range of projects addressing her cancer and advocating an "'alternative' approach to healing" through healthy and preventative eating. Her late works include "The Cost of Life," a Creative Capital-supported project, The Endangered Species Finder and Memorial for the Still Living (commissioned by Arts Catalyst, London), The Life Garden and Dying for the Other (with Eyebeam Art and Technology Center, New York), and The Delicious Apothecary. "The Anti-Cancer Survival Kit", part of The Cost of Life, was funded in part through a Rockethub campaign.

In September 2012, Da Costa contributed to dOCUMENTA (13)'s "The Worldly House," a collaborative piece recognizing the work of Donna Haraway.

== Publications ==
- da Costa, Beatriz, and Philip, Kavita. Tactical Biopolitics: Art, Activism, and Technoscience. Foreword by Joseph Dumit. MIT Press, 2008.
- da Costa, Beatriz, Schulte, Jamie, and Singer, Brooke. "Surveillance Creep!" In Radical History Review: New Imperialisms, 2006:95, Spring 2006.
- da Costa, Beatriz, and Claire Pentecost. "Of Patriots and Profits: New Tools for Keeping Academic Research in Line". In Radical History Review: Homeland Securities, 2005:93, Spring 2005.
