= Gessert =

Gessert is a surname of German origin. Notable people with the surname include:

- Armin Gessert (1963–2009), German computer game developer
- George Gessert, American artist
