= Adam Simon (artist) =

American artist

Adam Simon (born 1952) is an American art writer and conceptual painter. His works often feature stock photography, corporate logos, historical art images. According to Hyperallergic, he uses paint rollers, acrylics, and Mylar stencils to make silhouetted and overlapping paintings of images.

Born in Hampstead, England, Simon is one of the four sons of artist, Morris Simon and Josephine Simon from Johannesburg, South Africa. His brothers are Jason Simon, Dan Simon, and Mark Simon.

== Works ==
=== Exhibitions ===
Simon's work has been featured in exhibitions at Osmos (New York, NY), Carriage Trade (New York, NY), Studio 10 (Brooklyn, NY), Galerie Richard (New York, NY), Minus Space (Brooklyn, NY), The FLAG Art Foundation (New York, NY), Steven Kasher Gallery (New York, NY), Center for Contemporary Arts (CCA) (Santa Fe, NM), and Lesley Heller Gallery (New York, NY).

=== Public projects ===
From 1984-1988, Simon and Michele Araujo organized artist gatherings called Four Walls in Hoboken, New Jersey.. From 1991 - 2000, Four Walls was operated in the Greenpoint/Williamsburg neighborhood of Brooklyn, New York, primarily by Adam Simon and artist Michael Ballou. The Four Walls archives are housed in the Smithsonian Archive of American Art.

In 2006, Simon launched the Fine Art Adoption Network as part of the New Commissions Program at Art in General. Patricia Milder said: "Simon prefers to look at the network not as some sort of intentional social sculpture but as a natural outgrowth of his work as a painter."

== Art Writing ==
Simon has been writing art criticism since 2019. His reviews have been primarily for the blogzine, Two Coats of Paint, but have also been published in The Brooklyn Rail, Hyperallergic and the London based Journal of Contemporary Painting.

== Reception ==
Hyperallergic's Thomas Micchelli, in reviewing Simon's logo-based exhibition wrote, "Simon paints the Nike swoosh as Gustave Courbet painted the seaside at Etretat — as a realist." Tom McGlynn of The Brooklyn Rail wrote that, "Adam Simon engages this erstwhile feature in his ironically titled collage painting, Optimist (1992), by creating manic chains of circled want ads, interlocking as if the sky was the limit for the circlers ambition."
