= Alanna Lockward =

- Born: 23 March 1961; Santo Domingo, Dominican Republic
- Died: 7 January 2019 (aged 57); Santo Domingo, Dominican Republic
- Education: Universidad Autónoma Metropolitana-Xochimilco, Mexico City; Berlin University of the Arts
- Known for: author, curator, and filmmaker
- Movement: Decolonial aesthetics
- Website: alannalockward.wordpress.com

Alanna Lockward (23 March 1961 – 7 January 2019) was an author, curator and filmmaker based in Berlin and Santo Domingo. She was the founding director of Art Labour Archives, a platform for theory, political activism and art since 1996. Lockward had conceptualized and curated the trans-disciplinary meeting BE.BOP (Black Europe Body Politics; 2012–16). She contributed to the field of decolonial aesthetics, particularly through an Afropean lens, along with Teresa María Díaz Nerio, Jeannette Ehlers, Quinsy Gario, and Patricia Kaersenhout.

== Biography ==
Lockward was born in Santo Domingo, Dominican Republic, on 23 March 1961. She came from a family of famous intellectuals, her grandfather was George Augustus Lockward Stamers, a historian, university professor, philologist, writer, journalist, cooperativist and Gideon Society member. He is the award-winning author of the history of the African Methodist Episcopal Church (AME) and other Protestant congregations in the Dominican Republic ("Historia del Protestantismo en Dominicana"). Her great-uncle was the singer and songwriter Juan Lockward.

From 1979 to 1983, she was a student at the Universidad Autónoma Metropolitana-Xochimilco, Mexico City. She completed her postgraduate Master's Degree in Art at the Universität der Künste in Berlin. Her thesis was a review of articles from the renowned German newspaper Der Tagesspiegel. Her focus here was on the linguistic construction of Black identities ("Counter-reflection of a word field on the daily mirror"). Lockward was appointed Director of International Affairs at the Museo de Arte Moderno de Santo Domingo in 1988 and served on several occasions as selection and award jury in national as well as international biennials.

== Works ==
=== Curator ===
- "Call & Response" BE.BOP.2016 at the Berlin Theater Volksbuehne.
- Spiritual revolutions and "The Scramble for Africa" BE.BOP.2014 at Ballhaus Naunynstrasse.
- Decolonizing the "Cold" War. BE.BOP.2013 Roundtable and screening program Ballhaus Naunynstrasse, Berlin, 20–23 May.
- BLACK EUROPE BODY POLITICS BE.BOP.2012. Roundtable and screening program Ballhaus Naunynstrasse, Berlin, 4–6 May.
- Filipa César – The Embassy Haus der Kulturen der Welt (2011), Berlin solo show in the series Labor Berlin conceived by Valerie Smith, Director of the Visual Arts Department 15 April – 5 June
- Truestories. Truesuccess (2009), Freies Museum, Berlin, 31 October – 19 November.
- Naturaleza Intervenida (Intervened Nature, 2008) Espacio Iniciarte, Seville. With Juan Ramón-Barbancho, Nilo Casares, and Andrés Isaac Santana, 16 November – 20 December. Commissioned by Junta de Andalucía.
- In His Shoes (2007), Prague Quadrennial performance by Nicolás Dumit Estévez. In cooperation with Franklin Furnace, New York.
- F-Files (2005), Universität der Künste, Berlin Documentation Exhibition. Commissioned by the Institute for Art in Context.
- Días Hábiles–Noches Hábiles (Working Days- Working Nights, 2001), Museo del Hombre Dominicano, Museo de Arte Moderno, International Performance Showcase, Santo. Commissioned by the III Festival Internacional de Teatro.
- 3 Idos, 3 y 2 (Three Gone Ones, 3 y 2, 2001), Museo X-Teresa Arte Actual, Mexico City Contemporary Art from the Dominican Republic. Commissioned by the Dominican Embassy in Mexico.

=== Books ===
- BE.BOP. 2012–2014: El Cuerpo en el Continente de la Conciencia Negra (The Body in the Continent of Black Consciousness) Ediciones del Signo, Buenos Aires, collection "El Desprendimiento".
- Marassá and the Nothingness (Partridge Africa, 2016).
- Un Haití Dominicano. Tatuajes fantasmas y narrativas bilaterales (1994–2014) (Santuario, 2014)
- Apremio. Apuntes sobre el pensamiento y la creación contemporánea desde el Caribe (In Haste. Notes on Thinking and Contemporary Creation from the Perspective of the Caribbean)(Cendeac, 2006).

=== Films ===
Allen Report, Retracing Transnational African Methodism. received the production prize FONPROCINE 2013.

=== Awards ===
- Allianz Cultural Foundation
- Danish Arts Council
- Nordic Council of Ministers

=== Essays ===
- "Wild at Hair. IngridMwangiRobertHutter: Masks and Skin Politics as a German DeColonial Knowledge Production". In: ReARTIKULACIJA. Artistic-Political-Theoretical-Discursive Platform 10, 11, 12, 13. Marina Grznic (ed.), Belgrade, December 2010, pp. 23–24.
- "Towards a Utopian Archaeology. Moving-image, Decolonization and Continuities in Haiti, Puerto Rico and the Dominican Republic". In: Videoarte en Latinoamérica: Una visión crítica. Barcelona: Brumaria, 2008, pp. 81–89.
- "Pares & Nones: (In) Visible Equality". In: Small Axe. A Journal of Criticism 24, Department of Anthropology Columbia University, New York, 2007, 5 pages.
- "Elia Alba / Nicolás Dumit Estévez". In: Voces y Visiones. Highlights from El Museo del Barrio´s Permanent Collection. Museo del Barrio, New York, 2006, pp. 16–24.
- Elia Alba. Los Quehaceres del Agua (Water´s Endeavours) / Mónica Ferreras. La Verticalidad del Círculo (The Verticality of the Circle) / Charo Oquet. Una Sirena en el Reino de este Mundo (A Mermaid in the Kingdom of this World). In: Arte Contemporáneo Dominicano. Casa de América-Turner. Madrid, 2002, pp. 30–33, 66–71. 106–110.

== Death ==
She died on 7 January 2019 in Santo Domingo.
