= Ricardo Miranda Zuñiga =

American new media artist (born 1971)

Ricardo Miranda Zúñiga (born 1971 in San Francisco) is an American new media artist who approaches art as a social practice that establishes dialogue in public spaces. Themes such as immigration, discrimination, gentrification and the effects of globalization extend from his experience and observations into works that tactically engage viewers through populist metaphors while maintaining criticality. He has said, "I have always felt very strongly that for art to matter its need to be socially relevant and exist outside of the gallery and museum amongst people at large."

Zúñiga has shown his works in New York City; Berlin; Madrid; Valencia, Linz, Austria; Quebec; St. Petersburg; Chile; Washington, D.C.; Miami; São Paulo; Mexico; Tennessee; Chicago; Madison, Wisconsin; Buffalo; Philadelphia; and numerous times in California, including in San Francisco. Not limited to the traditional gallery space, he has exhibited his works in places as various as public parks; within the New York City Subway system; and at the San Diego-Tijuana border.

== Background ==
Zuñiga's parents are immigrants from Nicaragua. He grew up between there and San Francisco with a strong awareness of inequality and discrimination that exists in the United States. He attended the University of California at Berkeley, graduating with a Bachelor of Arts in Practice of Art and English Literature and a minor in Spanish Literature in 1994. He then attended Carnegie Mellon University in Pittsburgh, receiving a Master of Fine Arts in 1999.

== Selected projects ==
=== Vagamundo ===
Vagamundo is a 2002 online and mobile cart project for the street. It comprises a video game that brings light to the plight of undocumented immigrant labor in New York City. Made at Harvestworks Media Center in New York City, with audio by John Arroyo, Vagamundo has been presented in exhibitions at Exit Art, American Museum of the Moving Image, Bellwether Gallery, The Kitchen's street fair in Chelsea, Manhattan, festivals in Chicago and Los Angeles, and an evening at Columbia University's Computer Music Center.

=== Nexum ATM ===
Nexum ATM is a 2003 interactive video sculpture in the form of an ATM that presents a history of aggressive intervention by the US in ten small, poor countries or states, namely, Cuba, Mexico, Nicaragua, Panama, Hawaii, Philippines, Iran, Vietnam, Iraq, and Somalia. Accompanying the physical ATM is the NEXUM ATM website, an informational depository to contest the actions of the Bush administration by presenting information and links toward civil mobilization.

=== Public Broadcast Cart ===
Public Broadcast Cart is a shopping cart outfitted with a microphone, amplifier, speakers, miniFM transmitter, and a laptop with a wireless card in 2003. The shopping cart was designed to enable any pedestrian to become an active producer of a radio broadcast, transmitting to their immediate area via FM frequency and to The Thing.net's online radio station. It was presented in City Hall Park in New York City and Linz, Austria.

=== From Darkness to Daylight ===
Commissioned by the New Museum in New York City, FROM DARKNESS TO DAYLIGHT was a 2004 video installation that reflected on the history and the future of Manhattan's Bowery neighborhood. The sculptural part of the work was made of a series of large ducts that had been interwoven and inserted with monitors featuring computer-animated characters reflecting different histories of the Bowery. Each animation is based upon an actual resident of the Bowery and features recorded interviews of each.

=== Fallout ===
Fallout, commissioned by Turbulence.org in 2005, served as a repository of personal perspectives concerning the Nicaraguan national character. Initiated by requesting personal commentary from people from various generations of the artist's family, Fallout is an open archive of informed and thoughtful insights addressing the past, present and future of Nicaragua.

==== Fallout: What's Left ====
Drawing from submissions to Fallout, the artist constructed a revisionist history portraying the ebb and flow of Latin American Marxist revolution for the installation Fallout at Momenta Art, in Brooklyn in 2005. The installation featured, among other things, propaganda posters commissioned for the installation from four designers: Isabel Chang, Enrique Sacasa, Ed Adams, and David Ulrich.

=== Carreta Nagua, Siglo 21, Mexico City ===
In the colonial park, Alameda Central, located in the historic center of Mexico City, Zuniga offered free rickshaw rides in 2007 as part of his piece Carreta Nagua, Siglo 21. The passengers watched a nine-minute animation that told the tale of immigration, aging, and cultural and familial loss, based on the reality of the artist's parents. The Carreta Nagua is an old Nicaraguan fable that revolves around a cart pulled by Death. Zúñiga's performance with animation was commissioned for the festival TRANSITIO_MX02.

=== El Rito Apasionado ===
El Rito Apasionado (A Passionate Ritual), a video, was inspired by the rhetoric and tactics revolving around immigration used by conservative US officials to capitalize upon Homeland Security and the national fear mechanism utilized to receive funding for the militarization of the United States–Mexico border. In a hotel room in Connecticut, three non-actors, including Zuñiga, played Guevarrian Neo-Marxist Latino terrorist-revolutionaries meeting to help establish a balance toward justice for the crimes committed by the US toward small and poor nation states, cultures and peoples. The 22-minute El Ritual Apasionado was commissioned for the exhibition 50,000 Beds curated by Chris Doyle and screened at Real Art Ways in Hartford, Connecticut from July 21 through September 23, 2007.

=== Votemos.us ===
In 2008, at his residency at Eyebeam, Zúñiga created a mobile recording device entitled Votemos.us. Speakers sprouted from a voting cart with the wooden busts of the 2008 presidential candidates Barack Obama and John McCain, crafted by Charles Rittman, that broadcast the opinions of participating non-citizen residents. It generated discussion about the representation of real contributors to the US economy.

=== Breaking News, Buffalo Arts Center ===
Breaking News was a two-part project in 2009: a news media literacy workshop designed for young children and an art installation that reflected upon the manner that current events enter into our lives. The installation, at the Buffalo Arts Center, was informed by the workshop.

The news literacy workshop was conducted at the Gloria J. Parks Community Center in Buffalo, New York with children between the ages of seven and eight. They tended to define recent events as ones they overheard from television news that their parents watch, with the dominant topic at the time being Michael Jackson's death. They also identified local news, primarily neighborhood shootings and robberies.

The installation, at the Buffalo Arts Center featured the Breaking News application – an RSS reader with a critical twist. The content generated by the children was integrated into news media visualization made up of a textual feed of current headlines accompanied by computer-rendered illustrations of personalities (such as Katie Couric, Walter Cronkite) who establish news media understanding in the US. With news broadcast theme music serving as the soundtrack, the illustrations and text helped generate new interpretations of what we consider "the news."

Other installation elements were a selection of drawings and collages from the workshop, its documentation, video and printed content used in it, and related sculptural objects, such as radio sculpted to look like AK-47s previously created for a street performance and tuned to broadcasting radio news for the duration of the show.

=== Undocumented Drones, version0.1 ===
Undocumented Drones, version 0.1 is a 2011 series of modified hobby robots enhanced with an additional microcontroller, screen and radio module. Each robot presents a rotoscoped animation until it receives a Twitter message with the tag "#DREAMers". Upon receiving the tweet, the animation freezes, the motors are activated and the message or tweet is displayed. They were part of the group show "Mobility" at Momenta Art in Brooklyn in 2011 and "Sanctuary City" at the New York Hall of Science.

==== a geography of being : una geografia de ser ====
A geography of being : una geografia de ser is a 2012 installation that reflects upon the dynamics of the undocumented immigrant youths in the US. The installation consists of wooden kinetic sculptures with animated displays titled Undocumented Drones and a video game that places the player in the role of an undocumented youth facing several challenges. The Undocumented Drones are networked to the game and help the player through it.

== Collaborative projects ==
=== Copa Sonar, Berlin, 2006 ===
Copa Sonar was a public event in 2006 co-curated with musician Marco Barotti and curator Emanuele Guidi in the Schlossplatz in Berlin. Historically a highly politicized site used by both the political left and the right, the area was abandoned for its charged history and, at the time, informally used as a skatepark. For one day in July, it was the site of a public sound performance and broadcast in collaboration with sonambiente, and tesla, a Berlin new media art residency. Five experimental sound groups overtook the plaza: ap/xxxxx, B Component, the rottt, OLYVETTY, saal-c performed and broadcast via miniFM, while free wine and beer were distributed.

The name of the event (sound cup in Spanish) was a play on World Cup being hosted in the country at the time.

=== Miracle of Chile, Santiago, 2010 ===
A collaboration with new media artist and publisher Kurt Olmstead, Miracle of Chile was a workshop, public situation, bus intervention and a virtual labyrinth that investigated Milton Friedman's famous phrase "miracle of Chile". In 1981, the American economist declared it in reference to Chile's economic change through his neoliberal philosophy, and in 2010 the collaborators sought to question it in their work. Miracle of Chile was commissioned by independent curator and new media artist Ignacio Nieto for El Museo Nacional de Bellas Artes, Santiago, Chile.

Six graders in the La Victoria section of Santiago followed a basic discussion of neoliberal economic philosophy and the history of the phrase "miracle of Chile." They were given digital cameras and went for a stroll in their school's neighborhood to document traces of what they felt was the miracle of Chile. The school was for at-risk kids located in the poor neighborhood, and the classroom where the workshop took place was the location of a failed Microsoft School of the Future experiment in Santiago: each seat had a broken-down computer.

Chile's brick-paved sidewalks contain many areas where the brick is torn up and piled up. Zuniga took a few of these already broken-off pieces, which he saw as symbols of Chile's economic devastation, and made simple electronic circuits out of them with a microcontroller, knob, 32-character LCD, on/off switch and LED. The microcontroller he programmed with a series of instructions that were presented on the LCD screen as the user moves the knob. The instructions were: Please use the dial to read instructions./Find an interesting person./Ask the person what is the Miracle of Chile?/Reset the dial and give it to the person.

Olmstead and Zúñiga were struck by the level of public advertising and the extent to which public space had been privatized through advertising: Even the strap handles on Santiago buses held slots for advertising. One bus company ad stated "We worry about your security, what do you worry about?" The collaborators adopted this ad imitating its font, style and colors. One version included an illustration of Milton Friedman said "The economy is in your hands" and the other an illustration of Juan Sebastian Piñera Echenique, the neo liberal president of Chile, in ads declaring "Consumerism is in your hands."

The online labyrinth was made up of facades of buildings Zúñiga and Olmstead photographed around Santiago. On these facades were layered photographs photos taken by the six graders in the workshop part of the project.

=== EXCESS NYC, 2012–present ===
A community-based project that is a collaboration with New York City-based artist Brooke Singer that started in 2012, EXCESS NYC involved the design and fabrication of a quadcycle for food redistribution and composting. Partnering with food businesses in their Prospect Heights, Brooklyn neighborhood – coffee shops and restaurants – the artists aim to quantify how much money a business can save by composting rather than sending food waste to landfills. They are also redistributing edible food and have taken over an abandoned lot for the composting.

== Awards ==
- 2007 New York Foundation for the Arts Fellowship
- 2006–09 Tides Foundation Lambent Fellowship
- 2004 Turbulence.org Commission, New Radio and Performing Arts, Inc. Commission
- 2003 Future of the Present Artist Fellowship from Franklin Furnace
- 2003 Electronic Media and Film Program, New York State Artists Grant Award
- 1999 College Art Association Professional Development Fellowship

== Residencies and lectures ==
- 2013 Artist in Residence at HIAP
- 2011 Lecture with Brooke Singer at Santa Fe Art Institute

2009 Lecture at University of Buffalo's Visual Studies Department

- 2008 Artist in Residence at Eyebeam, New York City
- 2002 Artist in Residence at Harvestworks Media Center
