= Juan Sanchez (artist) =

American painter (born 1954)

Juan Sánchez
- Born: July 1954 (age 72); Brooklyn, New York, U.S.
- Other name: Juan Sanchez
- Education: Cooper Union, Rutgers University
- Occupations: artist, educator

Juan Sánchez, also Juan Sanchez (born July 1954) is an American artist and educator. He is an important Nuyorican cultural figure to emerge in the second half of the 20th century. His works include photography, paintings and mixed media works.

== Biography ==
Juan Sánchez was born in July 1954 in Brooklyn, New York. His parents are from Puerto Rico. Juan Sánchez earned his Bachelor of Fine Arts at Cooper Union in New York in 1977 and his Master of Fine Arts at Rutgers University's Mason Gross School of the Arts in 1980.

He is part of a generation of artists—such as Coco Fusco, Guillermo Gómez-Peña, Pepón Osorio and Papo Colo—who in the 1980s to 1990s explored questions of ethnic, racial and national identity in their work, be it through painting, video, performance or installation. Sánchez specifically became known for producing brightly hued mixed media canvases that addressed issues of Puerto Rican life in the U.S. and on the island. Of his work, critic Lucy Lippard once wrote: "it teaches us new ways of seeing what surrounds us."

Sanchez combines painting and photography with other media clippings and found objects to confront America's political policies and social practices concerning his parents' homeland of Puerto Rico. Sanchez often specifically addresses Puerto Rico's battle for independence and the numerous obstacles facing disadvantaged Puerto Ricans in America.

Sánchez is a professor of painting, photography and combined media at Hunter College in New York City.

His pieces are held in the collection of the Museum of Modern Art, the Metropolitan Museum of Art and the Whitney Museum of American Art, among others.

Sanchez's work was included in the 2025 exhibition Photography and the Black Arts Movement, 1955–1985 at the National Gallery of Art.

== Public Art Commissions ==
- "Reaching Out For Each Other," 2006, a series of faceted glass windows and wind screens at the 176th Street Stop of the 4 train, in The Bronx, for New York's Metropolitan Transportation Authority
- "Our Transcendence is Our Reign," 2009, a series of two murals and more than a dozen friezes for the James Monroe Educational Campus in the Bronx
- "Prevalence: Sacred Traces," 2019, a 12' x 22' mural created for the Duncan Student Center at the University of Notre Dame

== Honors and awards ==
- John Simon Guggenheim Foundation Fellowship, 1988
- Joan Mitchell Foundation Fellowship, 1995
- New York Foundation for the Arts Fellowship, 2003
- Pollock-Krasner Foundation Grant, 2001 and 2007

== Selected solo exhibitions ==
- Juan Sánchez: Rican/Structed Convictions, Exit Art, New York, NY, 1989
- Juan Sánchez: Printed Convictions/Convicciones Grabadas, Jersey City Museum, Jersey City, NJ, 1998
- 1898: Rican/Struction, Multilayered Impressions, BronxMuseum of Art, Bronx, NY, 1998
- Juan Sánchez: Rican/Structions: Paintings of the 90’s, P.S. 1 Contemporary Art Center, Long Island City, NY, 1999
- Juan Sánchez: Paintings, Prints, Poetry, Bernice Steinbaum Gallery, Miami, FL, 2001
- Rican/Structions: A Selection of Works by Juan Sánchez, Bernstein Gallery, Woodrow Wilson School of Public and International Affairs, Princeton University, Princeton, NJ, 2003
- The Masters Invitational: Juan Sánchez, Hewitt Gallery of Art, Marymount Manhattan College, New York, NY, 2006
- TRIPTYCH/TRIPTICO: RETRATOS/PORTRAITS, Zoellner Arts Center Main Gallery, Lehigh University, Bethlehem, PA, 2009
- Juan Sánchez: Unknown Boricuas + Prisoner: Abu Ghraib, at Lorenzo Homar Gallery, Taller Puertorriqueño, Philadelphia, PA, 2010
- Juan Sánchez, ¿What’s The Meaning of This?, BRIC House Gallery, Center for Puerto Rican Studies, New York, NY, 2015
