= Brooke Singer =

American artist

- Born: 1979 (age 46–47); Chicago, Illinois
- Education: Wesleyan University
- Awards: Eyebeam fellowship, NYSCA Individual Artist grant, Turbulence.org commissions (3)

Brooke Singer (born 1979) is a New York City–based media artist, co-founder of the art, technology and activist group Preemptive Media, and a professor of New Media at Purchase College, State University of New York. She works across disciplines engaging technology and science as an artist, educator, and collaborator. Her work exists in the form of websites, photography, maps, installations, workshops, and performances that involve public participation with an eye to social change.

She is also co-founder and president of South Williamsburg community garden La Casita Verde in Brooklyn, one of 11 sites in the borough, as of April 2015, slated to be developed for "affordable" housing. She was a former fellow at Eyebeam and recipient of an Open Society Foundations grant, a NYSCA Individual Artist grant, among several other awards.

== Background and education ==
Born in 1972 in Chicago, Illinois, she grew up in Washington, D.C. She received her BA from Wesleyan University in Photography and her MFA in studio art from Carnegie Mellon University.

== Preemptive Media ==
Preemptive Media was an organization that existed from 2002 to 2008 of artists, activists and the technologically inclined who formed their own style of trial runs and beta tests. At its core were Singer, interdisciplinary artist Beatriz da Costa (1974–2012), and engineer and robotics researcher Jamie Schulte.

=== Swipe ===
Swipe was a demo/workshop which premiered in 2003 that evolved into a performance and installation, Swipe Bar, an actual bar serving alcohol from which one received not only a drink but a printed receipt with all of the information "swiped from his or her driver's license at point of sale, plus any additional personal information glean[ed by the artists] off the Internet and archived databases while the ... drink was being prepared." The piece sheds light on the invisible practice of personal data collection via the state driver's license sold to commercial bidders in the US. Da Costa, Schulte, and Singer also wrote a paper on the topic entitled "Surveillance Creep! New Manifestations of Data Surveillance at the Beginning of the Twenty-First Century" published in the Spring 2006 issue of Radical History Review (published by Duke University Press).

Other iterations of Swipe include an online toolkit, by which users could read the barcode on a license and calculate the market value of their personal information, and a set of stickers commissioned by Whitney Museum Artport which users could place on top of the bar code or magnetic strip on their drivers' licenses to temporarily disable it. The performance-with-installation such as the one presented in 2004 at the Beall Center for Art + Technology in Irvine, California is the most well-known form of Swipe but these other forms were used to distribute the project and ideas further.

=== Zapped! and AIR ===
The collective organized a workshop on making a simple RFID detector on a keychain and an art installation around the idea called Zapped! They exhibited it as an installation in a Houston gallery with a contextualizing video and Madagascan hissing cockroaches with the reprogrammed RFID strapped on their backs for viewers to take home (to presumably let loose in a store of their choosing that employs RFID technology to jam such a system). Carl DiSalvo of Georgia Tech wrote of Zapped! in Design Issues that it "demonstrates the blurring of contemporary practices between art and design.... [which] results in a productive confusion between art and design in that it makes it easier to exchange forms, methods, and effects. Such exchanges are particularly fruitful to design, because arts practices and discourse have made much more significant inroads into the issues and sites of the public over the past several decades than has been witnessed within design." Preemptive Media also presented the work in New York City, Boston, San Francisco, and Ljubljana, Slovenia.

Next, Area's Immediate Reading (AIR) was the group's prototyping of portable air quality measurement kits to monitor air pollutants in Lower Manhattan, and to create data visualizations of its finds. An early prototype was developed in San Francisco, with a public workshop taking place in June 2006 in New York City and the full project launching that September. Each device measured carbon monoxide and nitrogen oxides levels, indicators for street-level pollution, and contained a GPS unit to pinpoint the reading's location, and could also reveal the location and emissions levels of major culprits, such as a power plant.

For its development, AIR received the first and only Social Sculpture Commission offered jointly by the Lower Manhattan Cultural Council and Eyebeam in summer 2005. It was presented in an art festival in Brazil's Belo Horizonte, a collaborative workshop in California's Riverside County, and art exhibitions in Pittsburgh, San Francisco, and New York City, and covered by a wider range of media.

== The U.S. Oil Fix and Our Chemically Modified Organisms ==
Using data from the CIA World Factbook, the Solar Energy Administration, the Solar Energy Initiative, the UN Human Development Report, and the Energy Information Administration, in 2006–07, she composed a map that charted the flow of the world's oil supplies to the US which also outlined other facts of the supplying countries, such as average life expectancy, GDP, literacy rates, carbon dioxide emissions levels, and poverty levels. A reworked version of the map was included in Lize Mogel and Alexis Bhagat's Atlas of Radical Cartography, which was presented at the 2008 European Social Forum in Malmo, Sweden and exhibited in university galleries at San Francisco State University, University of North Carolina Chapel Hill, University of Illinois Chicago, College of New Jersey, those in Troy and Cortland, New York and art centers and venues in Montreal; Utrecht, Netherlands; Providence, Rhode Island; Syracuse, New York; Baltimore; and Philadelphia. It was also included in the 2010 Greater New York Show at MoMA PS1 in Long Island City, Queens.

Several years later Singer created a "periodic table" of chemically modified organisms she learned about from her Superfund research. From looking at US landscapes and vast toxic sites within them these animals were another way to make evident the presence of forgotten but extant chemicals. Working with New York City-based illustrator John Kitses, she created a chart that showed a variety of 28 species—from blue-green algae to green frogs of the Connecticut River Valley to the male Florida panther—directly affected by exposure to pesticides, mercury, and other hazardous manmade chemicals, also naming some of the companies involved in making the chemicals, such as P&G, Dow, and Ciba.

== Excedentes/Excess NYC and Field Guide to the Electric Underground ==
In 2011, she and artist and husband Ricardo Miranda Zúñiga participated in a cross-cultural residency with Madrid-based artists Beatriz Marcos, José Luis Bongore, and Sissa Verde. The work that resulted, Excedentes, was the development of a cart system during the economic downturn in Spain to allow scavengers to bypass dumpsters. The artists wheeled the cart with edible but unsaleable food from the mercardo destined for the trash into a public space and displayed it for people to take—a more humane way of picking up free food than dumpster diving. The project became a discussion about liability issues for the merchants and a group proposing legislation so a cart like this could be a more permanent solution and not a temporary intervention in Madrid.

Upon their return to the States, the couple evolved a Brooklyn component of Excedentes, building a mobile bodega and composting machine, communicating with small businesses in their Prospect Heights/Crown Heights community, to help keep, educate, and encourage others about keeping food out of landfills. (According to the Natural Resources Defense Council, a quarter of the methane gas the U.S. emits is created by unconsumed organics in landfills.) The performance-demonstration entitled Excess NYC travelled to Stamford and New Haven, Connecticut, and Singer talked about it at her 2013 lecture at Cornell's School of Architecture Art and Planning.

The website for Excess NYC includes video and still documentation of Singer and Zúñiga's performances and the two tons of organic waste they were able to hold off in their neighborhood, as well as interviews with area food activists like a founding member of the Park Slope Food Coop and the director of the New York City Coalition Against Hunger. It also includes a link to a related project by Singer, Field Guide to the Electric Underground, an online catalog of video footage of microscopic samples taken in 2012–13 that compares dirt from the Brooklyn Botanic Garden, Casita Verde, a Harlem community garden, and a boutique reseller of Brooklyn compost.

== La Casita Verde community garden ==
In November 2013, Singer helped clear and establish with nine others a community garden in a vacant lot administered by the New York City Department of Housing Preservation and Development at the corner of Bedford and Division Avenues in Williamsburg, Brooklyn. The goal of the garden's administrators (Singer is president) is for its participation in the soil food web as well as it being the site of soil rehabilitation, educating the community and others about ecology and science, and for local employment. As of April 2015, it is one of 11 sites in the borough slated to be developed under Mayor Bill de Blasio's drive for "affordable" housing.

== Self-Portrait version 2.0 (SPv2) ==
Self-Portrait version 2.0 (SPv2) is an online application originally conceived by Singer in 2002 as her MFA thesis project and implemented in collaboration with programmer Paul Cunningham. SPv2 explores how identity can be constructed and perceived through data collection in cyberspace. Some data in cyberspace we consciously create to represent ourselves (emails and web sites, for instance). Other bits of data accumulate without our efforts—and many times without our knowledge—tracing certain of our interactions both in the physical and virtual worlds. Because of this data we do not willingly disperse, our cyber image is not always in our control nor ever fully knowable to us. SPv2 explores to what extent we are accessible online and what we may look like through mining Internet data.

== Selected awards and recognition ==
- Three of Singer's projects have won commissions by Turbulence.org.
- NYSCA Individual Artist grant, 2010, for Superfund 365.
- Madrid City Council's Department of the Arts commission for Excedentes.
- Open Society Foundations Audience Engagement Grant, 2014.
