= Exit Art =

Non-profit cultural center in New York City

Coordinates: 40°45′22.22″N 73°59′54.27″W

Exit Art was a non-profit cultural center that ran from 1982 to 2012 that exhibited contemporary visual art, installation, video, theater, and performance in New York City, United States. In its last location in Hell's Kitchen, Manhattan, it was a two-story gallery.

Jeanette Ingberman and Papo Colo founded Exit Art as an alternative exhibition space. Beginning with its first show, “Illegal America,” and continuing through to 2012, the gallery focused on representing the underdog, dedicating shows to the exploration of ideas and people outside the political, social, sexual, and aesthetic mainstreams. Throughout its history, Exit Art was located in various places. The first location, in 1982, was on West Broadway, in SoHo. In 2002, the gallery moved to its last location in Hell's Kitchen.

The gallery was known for its support of outsider artists. The 1992 show “Fever” was declared one of the ten most important shows of the decade by Peter Plagens from Newsweek, and the gallery's 18-year retrospective, "The End", won the Association of International Art Critics Award for Best Show in an Alternative Space in 2000.

Artists who exhibited at Exit Art include Chakaia Booker, Gabo Camnitzer, Patty Chang, Shu Lea Cheang, COOPER, John Drury, Jimmie Durham, Nicole Eisenman, Inka Essenhigh, Jane Hammond, David Hammons, Tehching Hsieh, George Gessert, Steve Giovinco, Brad Kahlhamer, DG Krueger, Alfredo Martinez, Julie Mehretu, Yucef Merhi, Shirin Neshat, Joshua Neustein, Roxy Paine, Adrian Piper, Ursula von Rydingsvard, Juan Sanchez, Rirkrit Tiravanija, Fred Tomaselli, Cecilia Vicuña, Cynthia von Buhler, Krzysztof Wodiczko, David Wojnarowicz, Martin Wong, World War 3 Illustrated, and Ricardo Miranda Zuniga, and Jolanta Gorawita.

Exit Art co-founder Jeanette Ingberman died on August 24, 2011, from complications of leukemia. The gallery closed in May 2012.

The archival materials for Exit Art can be found at New York University's Fales Library and Special Collections.
