= Waterpod =

New York public art project

The Waterpod was a community-based public art project in New York City in 2009. Open to the public, an ecosystem on a barge called the Waterpod visited the five boroughs at eight different piers for two weeks at a time during the summer of 2009, hosting a series of events. It was designed as a futuristic habitat and an experimental platform for assessing the design and efficacy of autonomous marine living systems in preparation for an assumed future. A multinational team including artists, designers, marine engineers, and civic activists led by the artist Mary Mattingly alongside the New York City Office of the Mayor Special Projects, the United States Coast Guard, and the New York City SBS Dockmaster Unit, this was a cross-disciplinary project that took place in the waterways of New York City in 2009.

== Route ==
The Waterpod Project route:

- June 12 – June 21: South Street Seaport, Pier 17, Manhattan
- June 22 – July 6: Sheepshead Bay Marina, Brooklyn
- July 7 – 20: Governor’s Island Yankee Pier
- July 21 – August 3: West Harlem Piers Park, Manhattan
- August 4 – 17: Brooklyn Bridge Park Pier 5, Brooklyn
- August 18 – August 31: Atlantic Salt Pier, Staten Island
- September 1 – September 14: Concrete Plant Park, the Bronx
- September 15 – October 15: World's Fair Marina, Flushing, Queens

== Goals ==
"...to fortify against the possibility of widespread climate change, desertification, and provide solutions for overpopulation and rising sea levels, the Waterpod offered a pathway to sustainable survival, mobility, and community building through a free, participatory project and event space that visited the five boroughs and Governors Island, for a voyage lasting from June to October 2009. The Waterpod’s mission has been to prepare, inform, and offer alternatives to current and future living spaces..."

"...The Waterpod provides space for: (I) community and artistic activity; (II) eco-initiatives including food grown with filtered rainwater; and (III) living space. It provides a model for mobile vessels that can provide relief to cities and countries struck by natural disasters, as well as a model for reshaping suburban landscapes to be a self-sustaining living system. The methods that make up the Waterpod provide people with necessary systems for rotational food supply, seasonal seed collection and soil-renewing compost, potable water, and mobile shelter with minimal upkeep..."

The Waterpod was an experiment in creatively using available, local reused materials from the New York Waste Stream: "...The dome covers were constructed Waterpod’s from repurposed billboard vinyl...The soil was made in the Bronx from compost and sand, tested and donated from the New York City Department of Parks and Recreation... Construction materials also included salvaged pieces of sunken vessels raised from the rivers bottom in the Rockaway and other areas."
