= Morris Simon =

American radiologist and Inventor

- Born: Johannesburg, South Africa
- Died: January 17, 2005 (aged 78–79)
- Citizenship: American
- Occupations: Radiologist, Professor, and Inventor

Morris Simon, MB, BCH, (1926–2005) was a South African-born American radiologist, professor, and inventor. His medical practice was based primarily at Beth Israel Deaconess Medical Center, Boston, where he specialized in chest radiology. He is also credited with a number of medical inventions, including a flexible filter for dissolving blood clots, and innovations that streamlined patient care and records holding.

== Early life ==
Morris Simon was born in Johannesburg, South Africa. He was the son of working-class Lithuanian Jewish immigrants, and the older brother of the writer, playwright, and director Barney Simon. He was the father of four boys, including the American artists Adam and Jason Simon, publisher Dan Simon, and teacher and labor organizer Mark Simon.

== Education and career ==
Simon received his undergraduate and medical degrees from Witwatersrand University, South Africa. In 1949, together with his wife Josephine, they moved to London, where he received his training in Radiology and imaging at the Royal College of Physicians and Surgeons.

In 1958, he was recruited by Felix Fleischner to become Assistant in Radiology at Harvard Medical School, where he remained for the rest of his life. Two years later, he was promoted to acting director at Beth Israel Hospital (now Beth Israel Deaconess Medical Center) Radiology Department, where he became director shortly thereafter. Between 1963 and 1970, Simon held the positions of Radiologist in Chief and Director of Clinical Radiology at the medical center. Following his long teaching career at Harvard Medical School, Simon retired as Professor of Radiology Emeritus in 1997.

Throughout his career, Simon published a number of articles and medical scholarship, which ranged in focus from radiological approaches to pulmonary hypertension, innovative CT imaging approaches to pulmonary arteries and the lungs, and early detection of pulmonary embolisms.

== Death ==
Morris Simon died of cardiac arrest at age 79 on January 17, 2005, at his home in Boston. At the time he was serving as Professor Emeritus at Harvard Medical School, and also the Radiologist in Chief and Director of Radiology at the Beth Israel Deaconess Medical Center, Boston.

== Legacy, inventions, and innovations ==
Simon is credited as inventing and developing a number of advances in the medical field.

=== Simon-Nitinol Vena Cava Filter ===
Simon participated the first nationwide collaborative pulmonary embolism trial in the early 1970s. It was in this context that he developed a widely used flexible filter to catch and dissolve clots in the bloodstream, the "Simon-Nitinol Vena Cava Filter." His research began in the 1960s, when he had adapted a metal alloy of nickel and titanium called Nitinol and which had thermal-memory properties. This alloy was previously used in military and aerospace contexts: at different temperatures its shape can be manipulable, when cooled, or spring into a predetermined shape when warmed. Simon modified the alloy for use at or below body temperature.

In its colder form, the filter is more compact. It is inserted through a catheter into the patient, then expands when it reaches the temperature of the body. The filter locks in place near the heart, acting as a sieve to stop blood clots from traveling toward the lungs. Still in use today, the device entered testing in the 1980s before it was approved for wide use thereafter. In his New York Times obituary, Herbert Y. Kressel, a professor of Radiology at Harvard, remembered Simon for his work, which demonstrated "an incredible breadth of creativity" and said that Simon "pioneered the medical use of nitinol."

=== Simon-Leeming Medical Classification ===
Simon also implemented the Simon-Leeming Medical Classification, which was used across the entirety of Beth Israel Hospital. It became the basis for the CLIP (Coded Language Information Processing System). The network implemented at Beth Israel allowed for quick retrieval of files and data based on anatomy, pathology, and findings—decades before the commonly used systems of digital patient file records had been put in place.

=== Additional innovations and honors ===
Simon is also credited for developing a number of other technical innovations, including a second blood filter that is meant to be removable, a needle used in biopsies, and a system designed to semi-automatically dispense specific doses of multiple medications to patients, in particular elderly ones. He also developed a combination ruler and magnifying caliper, as well as an ornamentally designed body caliper.

In January 2006, the Department of Radiology at Beth Israel Deaconess Medical Center dedicated their most advanced chest readings room in his memory as the "Simon Room."

Records of Morris Simon's medical research are held in the Morris Simon Papers, 1934–2005 collection at the Center for the History of Medicine at Harvard Medical School's Countway Library of Medicine in Boston, Mass.
