= Brian Holmes =

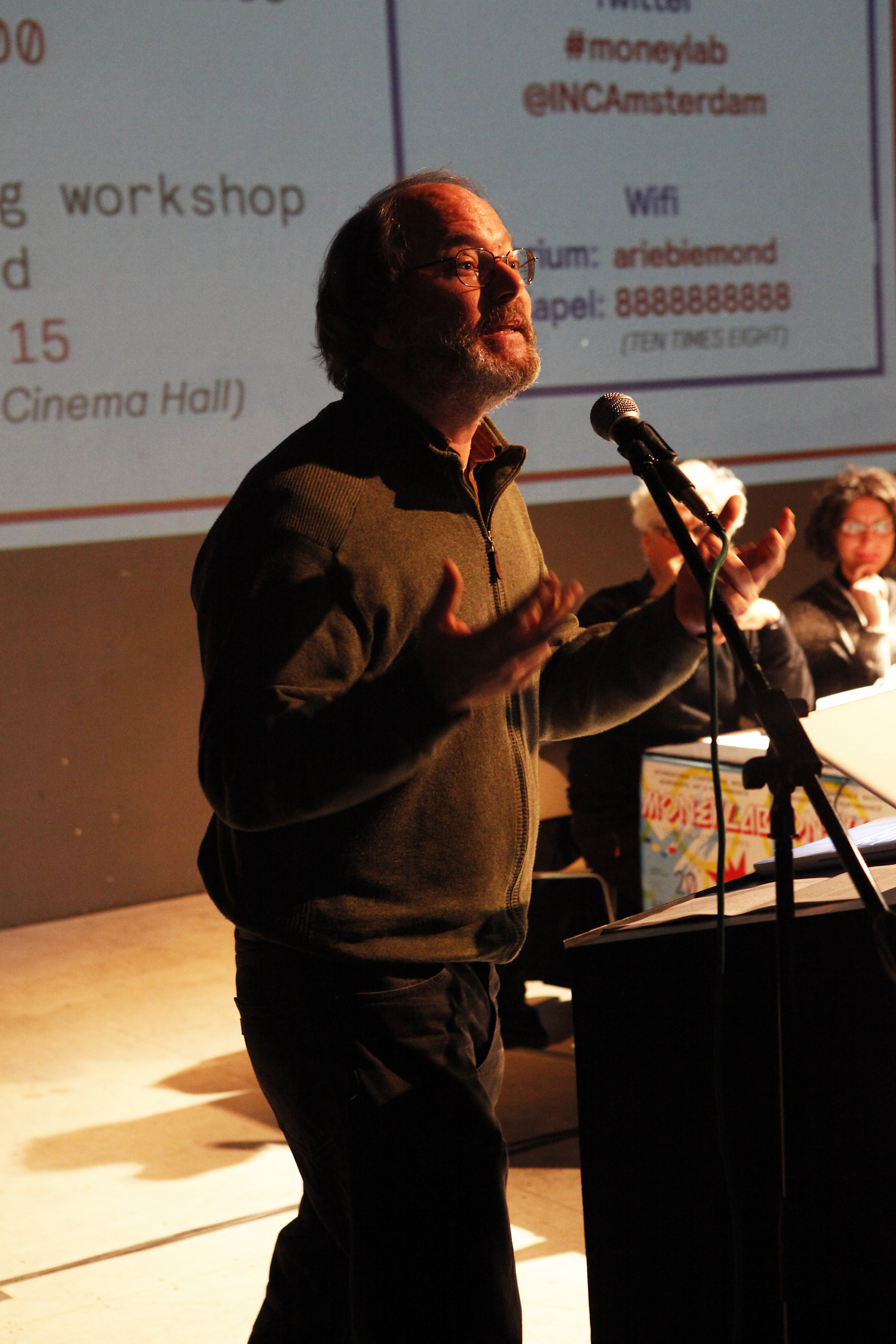
Brian Holmes, 2014

Brian Holmes is a professor of philosophy at the European Graduate School in Saas-Fee, Switzerland, where he teaches an intensive summer seminar. He has worked with the French graphics collective Ne Pas Plier (Do Not Bend) from 1999 to 2001 and the French cartography collective Bureau d'Études.

He holds a doctorate in Romance languages and literatures from the University of California at Berkeley and is the author of the book Hieroglyphs of the Future. He was the English editor of publications for Documenta X, Kassel, Germany, 1997. Holmes gives lectures widely in Europe and North and South America, and is a frequent contributor to the international mailing list Nettime, the art magazines Springerin (Austria) and Brumaria (Spain), and the interdisciplinary journal Multitudes (France).

In recent years, Holmes has been co-organizing a series of seminars with the New York City–based reading group 16 Beaver Group under the title Continental Drift, working on the issues of geopolitics and geopoetics. He maintains a blog under the same name, with the subtitle "the other side of neoliberal globalization".
