= Papo Colo =

Puerto Rican artist

- Born: Francisco Colón Quintero; August 12, 1946 (age 80); Puerta de Tierra, San Juan, Puerto Rico
- Notable work: Superman 51 (1977); Against the Current (1983)
- Awards: The Franklin Furnace FUND for Performance Art (1987); Guggenheim Fellowship (1991); National Endowment for the Arts (1991)

Papo Colo (b. August 12, 1946) is a Puerto Rican transdisciplinary artist whose practice spans performance, visual art, and cultural activism. Best known for his groundbreaking performance works and for cofounding the influential New York alternative art space Exit Art, Colo has shaped critical dialogues on identity, politics, and the environment for more than five decades. He lives and works between New York City and the El Yunque rainforest in Puerto Rico.

== Early life and education ==
At the age of 18, Papo Colo left his native Puerto Rico to begin working as a merchant marine, marking the start of a life shaped by movement, migration, and transoceanic experience. After returning to the island in 1971, he falsified a diploma from the University of Puerto Rico as his first conceptual art piece. In New York he studied under the tutelage of the poet Nicanor Parra at Columbia University. His interest in pre-Columbian and Latin American cultures led him to travel across Mexico for a year. From 1973 through 1980 he lived and worked between New York City and Barcelona. During these years he did a series of performances involving physical endurance with political undertones. He is best known for Superman 51, which consisted of the artist running with 51 blocks tied to his back on the West Side Highway until exhaustion. His father, Francisco Colón Garcia, was a boxing champion and his exposure to the glorification of the body through boxing was influential to his work.

== Exit Art ==
In 1982, Papo Colo with Jeanette Ingberman, founded Exit Art, an internationally known cultural center in New York City. In 1992 he founded the Trickster Theater, an experimental multilingual and multicultural theater company. The company served as an integral part of Exit Art's discourse and was held on the lower level of its facilities. In 2005 he wrote and directed Mplay, a theater piece created solely for the web. He has won numerous awards including The New York Times Best Inaugural Show by an Alternative Art Space for his exhibition Exit Biennial: Reconstruction Additionally, REACTIONS, an international response to 9/11 conceived by Papo Colo, was acquired by The Library of Congress for its permanent collection Jeanette Ingberman died August 24, 2011, from complications of leukemia.

== Artistic Career ==
In addition to serving as the curator and cultural producer of Exit Art, Papo Colo has organized over 100 exhibitions, often taking on the roles of both exhibition and graphic designer. Papo Colo's work has been widely exhibited at institutions, including The Clocktower, NY (2013); Galeria de la Raza, San Francisco (2009); El Museo del Barrio, NY (2008); National Gallery of Puerto Rico, PR (2007); Grey Art Gallery (2006); Art in General (2006); RISD Museum, Providence (2005); Barnes Foundation, PA (2017); and The Bass Museum of Art, Miami Beach (2001).

In 2009, MoMA PS1 presented a retrospective of his early work, curated by Klaus Biesenbach. The exhibition coincided with The Cleaner, a new performance staged in New York’s Chelsea neighborhood, and culminated in Procesión Migración, a public performance reflecting on the ongoing migration of Puerto Ricans to the U.S. mainland.

Colo is currently developing Pangea Art Republic, a new alternative art space situated in the El Yunque Rainforest of Puerto Rico.

== Awards ==
In 1991 Colo received a Guggenheim Fellowship, an award that is bestowed upon individuals who have demonstrated distinguished accomplishment in the past and potential for future achievement.

== Notable works in public collections ==
- Superman 51 (1977), El Museo del Barrio
- Photogenics (1979, 1982), Smithsonian National Museum of American History
- Aro Head: La huella de los campeones (2004), Museum of Art of Puerto Rico
- Every American Has Two Hearts (2006), Museum of Modern Art

== Selected exhibitions ==
=== Solo ===
- 1977: Armas Blancas, Galería Mec-Mec, Barcelona, Spain
- 1977: Contradiction, Spanish Institute, New York, NY
- 1979: Documentos Falsos, Galería Ciento, Barcelona, Spain
- 1980: Untitled / Anonymous, El Museo del Barrio, New York, NY
- 1982: Papo Colo: Lost and Gained Paradise, Part One, Just Above Midtown (JAM), New York, NY
- 1982: Language is the Mechanic of Culture, Franklin Furnace, New York, NY
- 1986: Will, Power, and Desire 1976 - 1986, Exit Art and Rosa Esman Gallery, New York, NY
- 1997: Paintings, Tyler School of Art, Temple University, Elkins Park, PA
- 2004: Arohead, Museo de Arte de Puerto Rico, San Juan, Puerto Rico
- 2009: Jumping the Fences, Galería de la Raza, San Francisco, CA
- 2013: Papo Colo, The Clocktower, New York, NY
- 2016: Papo Colo, MoMA PS1, New York, NY
- 2017: Assorted Times in Singular Spaces, Clocktower at the Liga de Arte in San Juan, Puerto Rico
- 2023: Papo Colo, Calderón, New York, NY

=== Group ===
- 1976: The Spirit of Independence, Cayman Gallery, New York, United States
- 1977: Roots and Visions, Smithsonian Institution, Washington, DC
- 1978: Resurgimiento, El Museo del Barrio, New York, NY
- 1979: Private Icons, Bronx Museum of the Arts, New York, NY
- 1980: Marking Black, Bronx Museum of the Arts, Bronx, NY
- 1981: VARS at JAM, Just Above Midtown Gallery, New York, NY
- 1981: Dark Thoughts: Black Paintings, Pratt Institute New York, NY
- 1982: Dirty Pictures, White Columns, New York, NY
- 1982: Illegal America, Franklin Furnace, New York, NY
- 1991: NY: The Next Generation, Carnegie Mellon University Art Gallery, Pittsburgh, PA
- 1992: Will/Power, Wexner Center for the Arts, Ohio State University, Columbus, OH
- 1992: SLOW ART: Painting in NY Now, MoMA PS1, Queens, NY
- 1992: Concurrencies, Grace Borgenicht Gallery, New York, NY
- 2001: globe>miami<island, The Bass Museum of Art, Miami Beach, FL
- 2005: Island Nations, Rhode Island School of Design Museum, Providence, RI
- 2006: The Downtown Show, Grey Art Gallery, New York, NY
- 2008: Arte ≠ Vida, El Museo del Barrio, New York
- 2013-2015: Radical Presence, organized at the Contemporary Art Museum, Houston, and which traveled to the Walker Art Center, the Yerba Buena Center for the Arts in San Francisco, and the Studio Museum in Harlem
- 2022: In Support, The Kitchen, New York, NY
- 2023: Juan Francisco Elso: Por América, Museum of Contemporary Art North Miami, FL
- 2024: The Garden of Forking Paths, Deli Gallery, New York, NY
- 2024: Politics and Daily Life, Palmer Museum of Art, Penn State University, University Park, PA
- 2025: The Color of Shadows, Dinner Gallery, New York, NY
- 2025: WORKS ABUNDANCIES II, Juf at 99 Canal, New York, NY
