= Jason Simon (artist) =

American artist (born 1961)

Jason Simon (born 1961) is an American artist. He is best known for film and video projects, as well as being one of the co-founders and co-directors of Orchard, an artist run-space that operated in the Lower East Side from 2005 to 2008.

== Early life ==
Jason Simon was born in 1961 in Boston, Massachusetts, to parents who had emigrated from South Africa via London. His father, Morris Simon, was a radiologist and inventor, and his mother, Josephine Simon, worked in community theater and arts education, eventually creating the first Masters in Women's Studies program at the Goddard Cambridge Program for Social Change. Simon is the nephew of South African writer, playwright, and director Barney Simon. He pursued undergraduate studies in literature and film at Sarah Lawrence College and Columbia University's School of General Studies, from 1979 to 1984. He is a 1984–85 alumnus of the Whitney Museum of American Art Independent Study Program, and earned a Masters of Fine Arts from the University of California, San Diego, in 1988.

== Early career and education ==
Simon left his undergraduate studies in 1981 to work in Cambridge, MA, for Stuart Cody, an audio engineer associated with the ethnographic film and American Direct Cinema community there. Returning to school a year later, he finished his studies at Columbia and the Whitney Museum Independent Study Program while working as a sound recordist in independent film production and advertising. This period resulted in his film and video projects Production Notes: Fast Food for Thought (1987), and Artful History: A Restoration Comedy (1987). He left New York City to study at UC San Diego from 1986 to 1988.

Production Notes: Fast Food for Thought was selected for the 1989 Whitney Biennial, at the Whitney Museum of American Art, New York. The work is a roughly 30-minute tape addressing the first-hand intentions and semiotics of high-budget television commercials that Simon had worked on. That same year, Simon premiered at the Collective for Living Cinema in New York City, together with the artist Mark Dion, their film Artful History: A Restoration Comedy, which explores the business of fine art restoration—its mercantilism and the narratives of the skilled artisans entwined in it.

== Exhibitions and Curating ==
=== Curating ===
Later in 1989, Simon joined the staff of the newly opened Wexner Center for the Arts, at Ohio State University, Columbus, Ohio, working alongside curator and art historian Bill Horrigan. At the museum, he served as an Assistant Curator of film and video through 1991, while also establishing the museum's unique technological laboratory for artists to produce professional films, which was originally called the Art & Tech Residency.

Following his role at the Wexner Center for the Arts, Simon began to organize video programming across institutions in Europe and New York. Programs such as "Downsizing the Image Factory" were screened at venues including Kunstverein München (1994), L'Unité d'Habitation, Firminy, France (1993), and Philadelphia Museum of Art (1995). In New York, Simon organized video programs including "Man Trouble," at Exit Art (1994), and "The Talking Cure," at Artists Space (1992), both New York. Much of these events consisted of video works by artists practicing at the time and capturing contemporary concerns of media, spectatorship, and activism.

=== Art Career ===
By the mid-90s, Simon was beginning to exhibit his own multimedia work in one-person exhibitions. In 1994, he presented "The Mayfair Show," at the Mayfair Club and at American Fine Arts, Co., both in New York. The exhibition focused on connections between artmaking and gambling through the lens of psychoanalysis, and would travel years later to Yale Union, Portland, OR, in 2016. As part of his representation with the Pat Hearn Gallery, Simon presented three solo exhibitions, one in 1994 titled "Album," an arrangement of large-scale polaroid photographs. His 1996 exhibition at the gallery, entitled "Spirits," included a selection of hand-toned silver gelatin prints that depicted various sinewy, curvilinear representations of cigarette smoke. In 1998, he presented his exhibition "Public Address: Collapsed" at Pat Hearn Gallery, a tableau with stadium-scale speaker horns resting on the gallery floor. Writing in the pages of Artforum, art historian George Baker likened the exhibition to "a scene of catastrophe," that "opened up a surprising number of reflections on contemporary sculptural production."

In the spring of 2005, Simon, along with several other collaborators, began operating Orchard, a cooperatively run gallery in New York City's Lower East Side. Orchard's primary format was to organize exhibitions of various artists by thematically connected groups, while also establishing connections between different artistic generations and reintroducing lesser-known historical artists or art projects. The project space was intended to last for three years and concluded in May 2008. In April 2006, Jason Simon exhibited his film Vera at Orchard, which he shot in 2003. The 25-minute video work is an interview with a woman named Vera that discusses her addiction to purchasing designer clothes and accessories, and the psychology of consumerism, debt and desire.

From 2003 to 2012, with the artist Moyra Davey, Simon organized the "One-Minute Film Festival," an annual summer gathering in a barn in upstate New York. Each year, dozens of artists would present new films lasting sixty seconds in length. By the time of the project's conclusion, over 350 filmmakers had participated to show over 700 films. The project would spawn exhibitions and festivals celebrating the screened films, presented by institutions including the Art Institute of Chicago in 2010, and MASS MoCA in 2013.

==== Festschrift for an Archive ====
In the 2010s, Jason Simon's art was regularly exhibited in New York City with his representation at the gallery Callicoon Fine Arts. In 2012, he presented the exhibition Festschrift for an Archive, which focused on the now-defunct MoMA Film Still Archive headed by Mary Corliss. In a review published by The New Yorker, critic Nana Asfour categorized the exhibition as part the genre known as "institutional critique," a "mode of probing the workings and assumed functions of art institutions." Simon continued to exhibit at Callicoon Fine Arts until the gallery's closing in 2021, with exhibitions in 2013, 2015, and 2018. His 2015 presentation Request Lines are Open, focused on the weekly audience of DJ Liberty Green's radio show Soul Spectrum, on WJFF radio, a non-profit station with a listening area that includes the large state and federal prison population of upstate New York. In 2019, Simon exhibited at the New York City gallery King's Leap. His show, The Red Books, united all 15 volumes of the American Film Institute's Catalog of Motion Pictures.

== Personal Life ==
Alongside his artistic practice, Simon has taught at several universities. In addition to his founding contributions to the Wexner Center's Art and Technology Lab, Simon also participated in the formation of the College of Staten Island's Department of Media Culture in 2002, having worked in the university's Performing and Creative Arts department for three years prior. He continued teaching at the institution's Media Culture department until 2023, and has also taught courses at Sarah Lawrence College, William Paterson University, Royal Danish Academy of Fine Arts, and School of the Art Institute of Chicago.

Simon is married to artist Moyra Davey.
