= Four Walls (artist forum) =

Collaborative event space

Four Walls was an artist collaborative event space. From 1984 to 2000, it hosted a wide range of one night activities, such as artist conversations, panel discussions, exhibitions, screenings and performances. The organization consisted of two consecutive phases from 1984 to 1988 in Hoboken, New Jersey and from 1991 to 2000 in the Greenpoint Williamsburg neighborhood of Brooklyn, New York. Throughout its life Four Walls was situated in growing creative communities where it served to encourage an exchange of ideas and generated alternative ways of experiencing art.

Four Walls was an influential art space for creative experimentation that brought together a spectrum of visual artists and non-artists in a process of collective art making, exhibition and discussion. It hosted various types of events that were often theatrical in nature with a humorous and playful approach. Neither a commercial gallery nor a nonprofit, Four Walls had an informal and artist driven structure as opposed to a typical arts administration approach. In this regard, it was a self-sufficient anarchic structure that consciously avoided many relationships of the larger New York art market.

== Hoboken 1984–1988 ==
Four Walls began as a single night exhibition space in Hoboken New Jersey by artist founders Adam Simon and Michele Araujo. It was active between 1984 and 1988. The idea grew from a conversation Simon and Araujo had with Adam Simon's uncle Barney Simon, who had co-founded the Market Theater in Johannesburg South Africa in 1976. In this conversation, Simon and Araujo had expressed their dissatisfaction with the commercial exhibitions in nearby Manhattan. At the time, Adam Simon had an exhibition of his paintings at Touchstone Gallery, a Fifty-Seventh Street gallery in Manhattan but was disappointed at the lack of critical discourse surrounding the exhibition process. Barney Simon encouraged them to take action. In response, the couple, with the help of many fellow artists, would begin to host one night exhibitions that included a forum for conversation. These exhibitions would be two person exhibitions or larger group exhibitions.

The exhibitions at Four Walls differed from conventional art exhibitions of the time in significant ways. Typically in a commercial gallery exhibition audience members would visit the exhibition separately over a period of weeks and criticism and discussion would occur at a later date. Four Walls diverged from this structure in that it consisted of a single night exhibition that included a public conversation. The evenings began in the manner of a typical art opening, allowing visitors to view the exhibition, however, later in the evening benches were set out and the audience would sit, listen and participate in a conversation in some way related to the exhibition. This conversation was between the artists or an invited panel and the viewing audience. This structure served to create a unique dynamic, in which the audience experience of the exhibition and conversation all happened at the same time.

Four Walls purposefully avoided exhibitions focused on a single artist's work. Usually, it was the artists themselves that proposed either two person or thematic group exhibitions. The first exhibition was a two-person exhibition of Christopher Wool and Joyce Pensato. In its pursuit of a more critical and inclusive discourse the discussions could vary greatly. Many of the discussions exemplified the themes of the mid-1980's, such as Post-Structuralism, gender politics and censorship, as well more practical concerns of art making. However, the format was flexible enough to accommodate a less academic approach that did not require addressing the exhibition directly but instead allowed for discussion of subjects related to the artworks on display.

In 1988, Four Walls hosted three events at the nonprofit space White Columns. These exhibitions would mark the end of the first phase of Four Walls although Simon always contended that anyone could start doing the events. From 1989 to 1990 Four Walls was dormant and there were no events.

== Brooklyn 1991–2000 ==
After a two-year hiatus, Four Walls began a second phase in Brooklyn New York. This second phase was founded by artists Michael Ballou and Adam Simon after the two were introduced by fellow artist Amy Sillman. Claire Pentecost would join Ballou, Simon and Sillman to form a core group of artist organizers. Throughout the 1990s Ballou and Simon would remain the organizers of the project, Sillman and Penecost's contribution being significant in the initial years of the project.

In 1990, artist Amy Sillman introduced Mike Ballou to Adam Simon. At that time, Ballou was interested in hosting events at his space in Brooklyn. Agreeing to reinitiate the project, Four Walls would be located at 138 Bayard Street in Brooklyn, New York in a garage building with the events being hosted on the ground floor level. Given the informal structure, numerous artists participating and various roles, it is difficult to describe the organizational structure. Like Simon and Araujo who lived in the Hoboken location, Ballou lived at the Bayard Street location and was a constant presence. Ballou often organized, hosted and documented the events. In 1997, art critic Roberta Smith referred to Ballou as 'a guiding spirit at Four Walls'.

The first event in the Bayard street location entitled The Transmission of Violence was organized by Helen Molesworth in 1991. This was followed by events such as A Puppet Show For Adults a performance by artists Michael Smith and Doug Skinner and next was an open show entitled The Neurotic Art Show that included a panel of psychoanalysts.

== Types of events ==
In the Brooklyn phase of Four Walls the range of events greatly expanded. In the Hoboken era, events were limited to two person exhibitions or group shows that included public conversations or panel discussions. Some of the group exhibitions were organized as 'open shows'. In the second Brooklyn phase these expanded to include Blender Nights, The Slide and Film Club and public conversations. As a rule, Four Walls did not do one person exhibitions. Additionally, Four Walls also participated in satellite exhibitions that were hosted by other institutions and galleries outside the Four Walls location.

=== Two-person exhibitions ===
These exhibitions focused on the works of two artists and lasted a single evening. The event included a discussion between the two artists.

=== Group exhibitions ===
Including the works of numerous artists, these exhibitions were one night events that included a public discussion. These exhibitions were generally organized by artists and not professional curators. These exhibitions had themes that were often reflexive of the process of art making. For example, the exhibition entitled 'The Naked Paint Show' in 1985 with James Bohary, Geoffrey Dorfman, Tracy Jones, Andy Miller and Pat Passlof.

=== Open Shows ===
Unlike the group exhibitions where an organizer selected the artists who would participate in the exhibition, the Open Show format allowed any artists who responded by phone to the exhibition announcement at a given time to be included in the exhibition. As long as the proposed artwork's scale could be accommodated by the gallery space and that the number of predetermined artists was not exceeded, any applicant could participate in the exhibition. The first open show, conceived by Steven Kasher, entitled Before & After was in 1984. This evening featured up to fifty artists who presented two works each, ironically addressing their state before and after becoming 'sophisticated modern artists'.

=== Blender Nights ===
Blender Nights were the conception of founding member Michael Ballou, where a writer and a visual artist were paired together to produce a night of performance. The duos did not present their individual projects but worked collaboratively to produce a single work. The inaugural Blender Night was a collaboration between Ballou and Kurt Hoffman which consisted of an evening of erotic fiction and chamber music entitled 'The Honorable Discharge'.

=== The Slide and Film Club ===
The Slide and Film Club consisted of evenings where audience members presented their own film or slide projections. In this context, most of the audience were also the producers of the works. Although many of the presenters were practicing artists, the presentations tended to not be their official artwork but instead 'homespun' time based works intended for the context of The Slide and Film Club. Michael Ballou would continue The Four Walls Slide and Film Club after the closing of the Bayard Street location in 2000.

=== Public conversations ===
The public conversations series grew out of the Hoboken phases of the 1980s and were organized by founder Adam Simon. In the 1990s these usually were pairings of artists, one interviewing the other. Unlike in the Hoboken period, these public conversations did not accompany an exhibition or an art opening and took place both in the Bayard Street location and elsewhere. One example was a conversation between William Pope.L and Brian Conley at Postmasters Gallery. The conversation was delayed because of the apparent lateness of Pope.L, however it turns out he was hidden under a pile of Wonder Bread and emerged from the pile to participate in the conversation wearing only a jockstrap.

=== Satellite projects ===
Periodically Four Walls was invited to participate in exhibitions hosted by other institutions. In 1988, Four Walls mounted three events at the non-profit gallery White Columns in New York City. Real Democracy was an Open Show that allowed the first 100 people to call in to participate in the exhibition which was held on November 8. Attendees to this event also viewed the US election results that were broadcast that evening. On November 10, Four Walls hosted a two-person exhibition of artists Tom McGlynn and Tim Daley. Finally, Four Walls hosted a group exhibition entitled Wedding Pictures on November 12 in which artworks by various artists were paired with enlarged wedding announcements from the New York Times.

In 1992–1993, Four Walls participated in the exhibition at MoMA P.S.1 entitled Seven Rooms/Seven Shows. For this project, the collective produced The Replica of Four Walls, a miniaturized scale model of the Four Walls Brooklyn building that included their own series of exhibitions inside the model. These so-called 'Mini-Shows' were organized by various artists such as Marilyn Minter, Craig Kalpakjian, Amy Sillman and Jason Simon. Many other artists participated in the production of the model, such as Joe Amrheim, Loretta Lopez, Paul Ramirez Jonas, Barbara During, David Scher and many others. The model would eventually have different Mini-Shows produced for it throughout its life. The Robert J. Shiffler Foundation acquired the Four Walls model and included it in other exhibitions.

Four Walls was included in the 1995 exhibition entitled Other Rooms at Ronald Feldman Fine Arts. Four Walls presented The Jobs Show in which artists posted artifacts from their day jobs next to a single film slide of their artwork hung from a push pin.

In 1997, Four Walls produced a work entitled, Liberty Exchange Project for a group exhibition of outdoor works curated by the artist collective p.t.t.red. The exhibition, entitled, Niemandsland took place in the region around the Brenner Pass, Italy. The exhibition explored the conditions and unique attributes of the border region. Four Walls presented more than forty artworks representing the Statue of Liberty by artists from Brooklyn which were offered for exchange to the people of Brenner.

In 1999, the Four Walls was included in the exhibition entitled Get Together at the Vienna Kunsthalle.

== Context ==
Four Walls in Brooklyn was rooted in the burgeoning art scene of the Greenpoint and Williamsburg neighborhoods of the 1990s. The neighborhood's artist population grew significantly in this decade. Like in the Hoboken era, the collective was founded in a decade when most artists living in these neighborhoods were discounted from the commercially focused Manhattan art world. In this growing artist community, Four Walls events gave many artists opportunities early in their career. It was also a place where well known and commercially successful artists would overlap with lesser known artists on a more equal footing in a setting that lacked pretensions commonly associated with the visual arts culture. However, by the turn of the century, the gentrification process in Greenpoint and Williamsburg would be in full swing.

In the New York art scene of the 1980s and 90's, the mission of numerous non-profit art galleries was to exhibit under recognized artists and to take an oppositional stance to mainstream art galleries and museums. This 'alternative space' category was widely embraced in this period and Four Walls was often contextualized in this category. However the term was never fully embraced by the Four Walls core organizers because they saw the alternative space category as reinforcing the roles of artist, curator, collector and funder and how these institutions addressed only an imagined public. Four Walls would prefer to challenge these roles adopting a different approach often describing Four Walls as a "laboratory" or "club house" which more accurately described how the collective addressed the immediate artist community and encouraged experimentation. By the 2000s the term alternative space would begin to wane in the institutional world.
