= Australian Network for Art and Technology =

The Australian Network for Art and Technology (ANAT), was seeded by artist Dr Francesca da Rimini in Adelaide in 1984 through Interface, an art and technology project presented at the Adelaide Festival of Arts. ANAT then became an incorporated entity in 1988.

ANAT is a nonprofit organization that connects artists in projects with scientists and technologists. Its programming includes workshops, a triennial, publications, and immersive residencies.

The network has 4 employees and is located in Adelaide, South Australia and has a national scope. It currently trades under the Association Incorporations Act 1985, and operates with partners both nationally and internationally.
