= These Four Walls =

These Four Walls may refer to:

- These Four Walls (Shawn Colvin album), 2006
- These Four Walls (We Were Promised Jetpacks album), 2009
- "These Four Walls", song by Little Mix from the album Salute
- "These Four Walls", song by Irma Thomas written by Lynn Farr, 1970
- "These Four Walls", song by Sara Evans from the album Real Fine Place
