= Amanda McDonald Crowley =

New York-based Australian curator and arts administrator

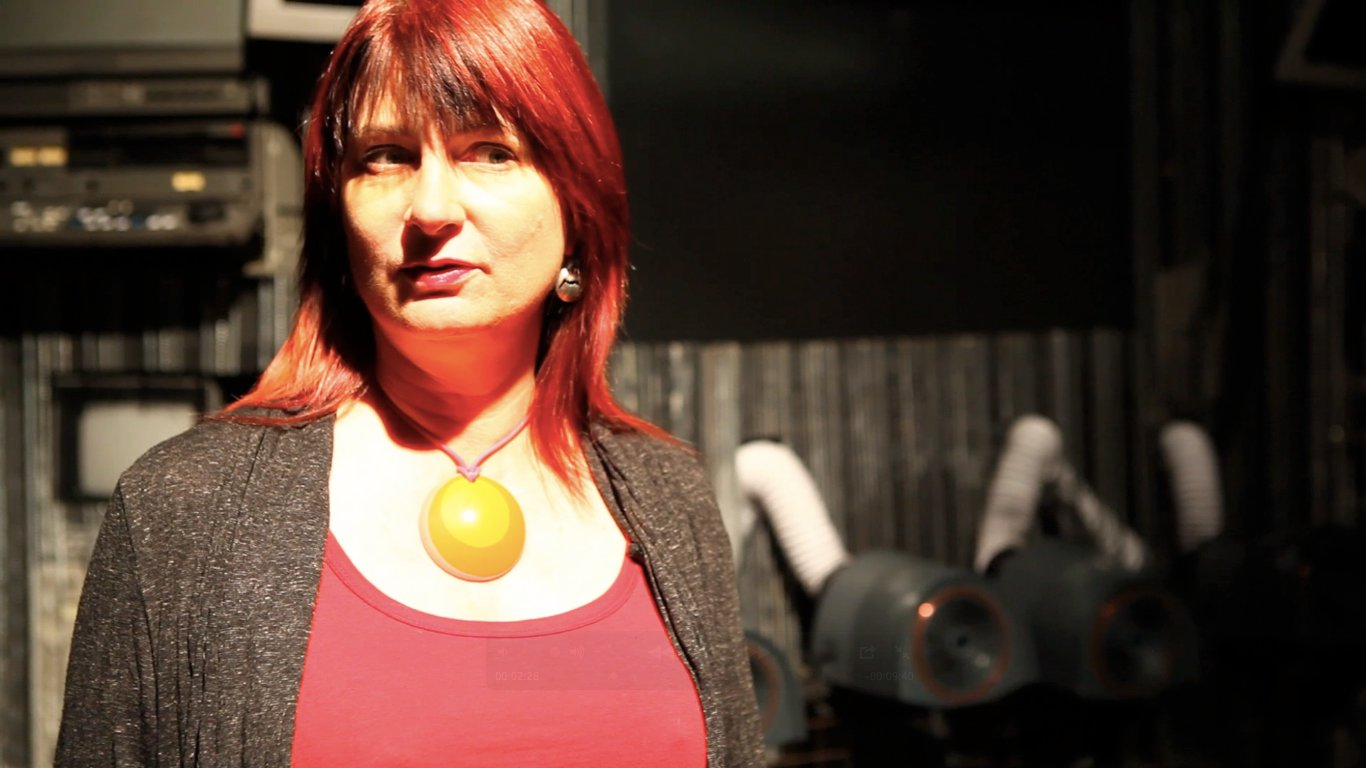
- Born: Matamata, New Zealand
- Education: Australian National University; Sydney University; College of Fine Art, University of New South Wales
- Known for: Curator and arts administrator

Amanda McDonald Crowley is a New York-based Australian curator and arts administrator who has created exhibitions and events focused on new media art, contemporary art, and transdisciplinary work. She has served as the executive director of Eyebeam Art + Technology Center in New York City and as the artistic director at the Bemis Center for Contemporary Arts in Omaha, Nebraska.

== Education ==
Crowley has a B.A. from Australian National University, where she did a double major in Fine Arts and German.

== Career ==
Crowley began her career working with a range of arts organizations in Australia including the Australia Council for the Arts, Arts Training Australia, and Electronic Media Arts Australia, which incorporates the Australian Video Festival. From 1995 to 2000 she was director of the Australian Network for Art and Technology (ANAT), where she developed residencies for artists in settings ranging from contemporary art spaces to science organizations. She also organized virtual residencies and master classes for artists and curators.

Since the early 2000s, Crowley has become known for curating and organizing international new media and contemporary art events. Key themes in her curatorial work have been food and sustainability. In 2002, she was associate director of the Adelaide Festival, for which she also co-chaired the working group that curated an affiliated exhibition and symposium entitled "conVerge: where art and science meet." In 2004, she went on to serve as the executive producer for ISEA2004, which was held in Tallinn, Estonia, and Helsinki, Finland, as well as on a ferry in the Baltic Sea. In 2005, she became the executive director of Eyebeam Art +Technology Center in New York City, a position she held until 2011. Crowley is credited with returning Eyebeam to its roots as an experimental workspace for artists and fostering its growing community of artists.

In 2014-2015, she was Artistic Director at the Bemis Center for Contemporary Arts in Omaha, Nebraska. In addition to long-term positions such as the one with Eyebeam, she has done shorter curatorial residencies around the world, including at the Banff Center for the Arts (Canada), Bogliasco Foundation (Italy), Helsinki International Artists Program (Finland), Santa Fe Art Institute (U.S.), and Sarai New Media Institute (India).

Crowley occasionally writes for journals such as Artlink, RealTime, the Sarai Reader, and Art Asia Pacific.

Crowley is a board member of NAMAC (National Alliance for Media Art + Culture). She has also been a board advisor of the Seattle art space AKTIONSART since its inception in 2014.

== Curatorial projects and exhibitions ==
- "Agrikultura" (2017), a public art event in Malmö, Sweden
- "Invisible in Plain Sight" (2016), a permanent exhibit at the Senior Planet Exhibition Center
- "Swale" (2016), a floating art barge and food forest by artist Mary Mattingly
- "Food Nostalgia" (2016), at Radiator Arts, Long Island City
- "GastroLabs" (2014), a program series developed with New Media Scotland for the Edinburgh Science Festival
- "CONSUME" (2013), a group show at Gallery@CalIT2, a joint project of UC San Diego and UC Irvine
- "X-LAB" (2011), a group show at Eyebeam
- "FEEDBACK" (2008), a group show at Eyebeam

== Publications ==
- "System X: Interview with Founding Sysop Scott McPhee." In Judy Malloy, ed., Social Media Archeology and Poetics. MIT Press, 2016.
- "Wildstyle: a story of 1980s New York graffiti through the lens of hip-hop culture." Artlink, 2014.
- "Creative Encounters: The Art/Science of Collaboration." Sarai Reader, 2003.
- "Cacophony + cramp for the sensory bundle." Artlink 22:4 (2002): 41.
- "Electronic art in Australia: do we have critical mass?." Artlink 16:2-3 (1996): 90.
