= Four walls (filmmaking) =

Film production system

The four walls (also known as the four wall system) is a film production system whereby a film production company rents a sound stage and associated space but then separately contracts for additional facilities and hires freelance staff. The four walls system became prominent in the 1960s, following the demise of the Hollywood studio system from 1948. Some big studios, like Pinewood Studios in England, became four walls facilities for independent film producers and television companies. These facilities no longer engage in the development or distribution of films.
