= George Gessert =

George Gessert is one of the best-known artists in the contemporary art movement known as bioart, also spelled BioArt. Gessert began his career as a painter and printmaker, and began breeding plants as an art form in the late 1970s. Beginning in the 1980s, Gessert's work focused on the overlap between art and genetics, and he has exhibited a series of installations of hybrids and documentation of breeding projects.

== Early life ==
George Gessert was born in 1944 in Milwaukee, Wisconsin. He has a BA in English from the University of California at Berkeley 1966 and an MA in fine arts from the University of Wisconsin-Madison in 1969.

== Technique ==
Gessert creates his artistic irises by hybridizing wild varieties and discarding undesirable results. He is especially interested in plant aesthetics and ways that human aesthetic preferences affect evolution. Gessert calls his practice "genetic folk art," and his work points to the way nature is interpreted—even authored—by humans. Gessert's work mainly focuses on irises and other ornamental flowers.

== Awards ==
Gessert's awards include the Leonardo Award for Excellence and the Pushcart prize for his essay, "Notes on Uranium Weapons and Kitsch." His article, "An Orgy of Power" was included in Best American Essays 2007. Gessert is also an Editorial Board Member of Leonardo Journal published by MIT Press for Leonardo/ISAST, the International Society for the Arts, Sciences and Technology.

== See also ==
- Leonardo/The International Society for the Arts, Sciences and Technology
- Art and Genetics Bibliography compiled by George Gessert for Leonardo/ISAST
- Art + Bio Gallery curated by George Gessert for Leonardo/ISAST
