= Brumaria =

Spanish artist collective founded in 2002

Brumaria is a Spanish artists and thinkers group founded in 2002 dedicated to publishing printed books, disseminating essays and documents online, and to a collective art practice, in a multiple-and-intertwined methodology.

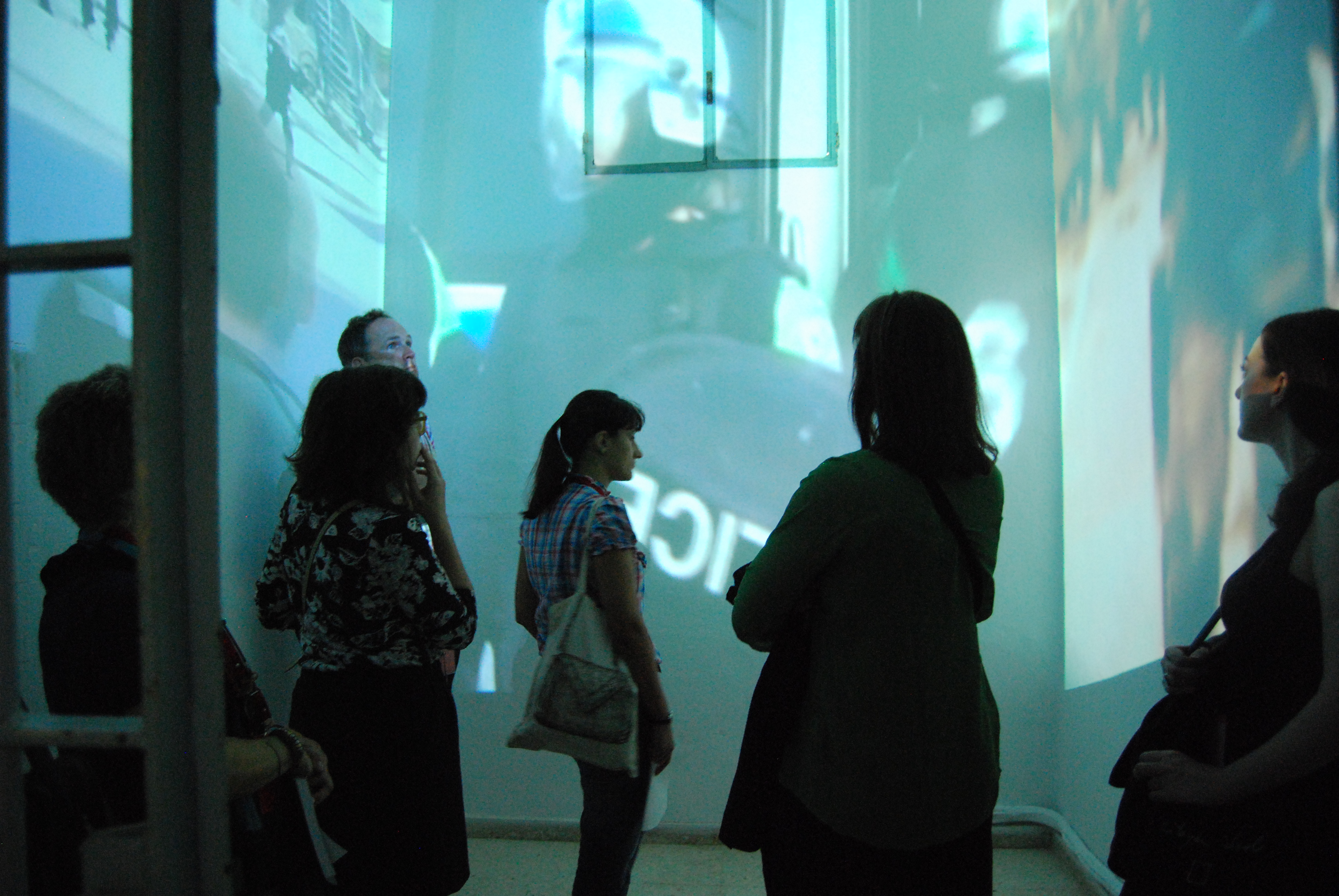
Installation view of one of the two cells of the installation at the former jail of San Anton, Cartagena, Murcia, Spain. Manifesta 8

Often its projects are related to the construction of truth by means of the violence that lays inevitably at the very foundation of power structures. Such is the case of the work Expanded Violences, which was made on commission for Manifesta 8. It consisted of a video installation that occupied two cells of the former jail of San Antón, Cartagena, Spain. Both cells were flooded with all sorts of video footage of war and police violence, one of the cells was set to very cold temperatures and the other was very hot.

In 2007, there was criticism when Brumaria was invited to be part of the documenta 12 Magazine Project. The course of events during the two years prior to the celebration of the show in Kassel led to the group to publish the book Documenta 12: Modernity? Life! which included texts by Art & Language, Roger M. Bruegel (Chief Curator of documenta 12), Leo Bersani, Judith Butler, Andreas Huyssen, Maurizio Lazzarato, Pamela M. Lee, Jacques Rancière, and Slavoj Žižek.
