= List of Grinnell College alumni =

This list of Grinnell College alumni includes graduates, non-graduate former students, and current students of Grinnell College, Iowa, US.

== Academia and research ==
Name	Class year	Notability	Reference
Dale Furnish	1962	American legal scholar and rofessor	
Benjamin Barber	1960	Political theorist, author of Jihad vs. McWorld	
Oliver E. Buckley	1909	President and director of Bell Labs, namesake of the Oliver E. Buckley Condensed Matter Prize	
Thomas R. Cech	1970	Co-winner of 1989 Nobel Prize in Chemistry, president of the Howard Hughes Medical Institute	
May-lee Chai	1989	Author, professor and American Book Award winner	
Mary Sue Coleman	1965	President of the University of Iowa (1995–2002) and the first female president of the University of Michigan (2002–2014)	
Ioannis D. Evrigenis	1993	Professor of Political Science and Chair of the Department of Classics at Tufts University	
Amanda L. Golbeck	1974	Lead editor of Leadership and Women in Statistics, winner of 2016 Committee of Presidents of Statistical Societies Elizabeth L. Scott Award	
Roy Richard Grinker	1983	Anthropologist, editor of Anthropological Quarterly	
Frances Harshbarger	1923	One of the first female American mathematicians to receive a doctorate	
Frank Irving Herriott	1890 (BS) 1893 (MS)	Acting professor of political science (1895–1898)	
Sally Hughes-Schrader	1917	Professor of Zoology at Duke University, fellow of the American Academy of Arts and Sciences	
Roger Koenker	1969	Professor of Economics at University of Illinois and University College London	
Jennifer Manlove		Sociological research scientist at Child Trends	
David Maxwell	1966	President of Drake University	
Thomas W. Merrill	1971	Charles Evans Hughes Professor of Law at Columbia Law School	
Carol Myers-Scotton	1955	Linguist	
William A. Noyes	1879	Analytical and organic chemist; determined atomic weights	
Clair Patterson	1943	Geochemist, first person to accurately date the age of the Earth, responsible for the removal of lead from gasoline	
Paul G. Risser	1961	President of Miami University and Oregon State University	

== Arts ==
Name	Class year	Notability	Reference
Kevin Cannon	2002	Comics writer and artist	
Zander Cannon	1995	Comics writer and artist	
Cornelia Clarke	1909	Nature photographer	
Martha Cooper	1963	Icon of the street art movement and author of Subway Art	
Herbie Hancock	1960	Jazz musician and composer	
Pat Irwin	1977	Composer, musician, and guitarist	
Jesse Macy	1870	Political scientist and historian	
Philip Manuel	1913	Pianist, harpsichordist, teacher	
Thomas Meglioranza	1992	Operatic baritone	
David Mura	1974	Writer, memoirist and poet	
Edwina Florence Wills	1937	Artist and composer	

== Business and finance ==
Name	Class year	Notability	Reference
Nordahl Brue	1967	Founder of Bruegger's Bagels	
John B. Chambers	1977	Chairman of the Sovereign Debt Committee at Standard and Poor's	
Paul McCulley	1979	Economist, managing director at PIMCO	
Cindy Pritzker		Businesswoman, philanthropist, member of the Pritzker family	
Joseph Rosenfield	1925	Businessman, made initial contribution to Intel and donated it to Grinnell College; called the "Patriarch of Iowa Business" by Des Moines Register	
Ham Serunjogi	2016	Co-founder (with Maijid Moujaled '14) of Chipper Cash, one of the most successful fintech companies in Africa	
Waid Vanderpoel	1943	Economist and former chief investment officer of First National Bank of Chicago	

== Entertainment ==
Name	Class year	Notability	Reference
Emily Bergl	1997	Actress, best known for Men in Trees	
Gary Cooper	1926 (did not graduate)	Actor, best known for High Noon, received five Oscar nominations for Best Actor	
Peter Coyote	1964	Actor, author, narrated the opening ceremony of the 2002 Winter Olympics and Oscar telecasts	
Walter Koenig	1958 (transferred)	Actor, best known as Chekov in Star Trek	
Kumail Nanjiani	2001	Stand-up comedian, Academy Award-nominated writer, actor and comedian, best known for role on TV series Silicon Valley and co-authorship and performance in film The Big Sick	
Edward L. Rissien	1949	Film producer	
Ian Roberts	1987	Actor, founder of Upright Citizens Brigade	
Win Rosenfeld	2000	Screenwriter and producer, president of Monkeypaw Productions	

== Government, law, and public policy ==
Name	Class year	Notability	Reference
Henry Carter Adams	1874	Economist, promoter of the American Economic Association, led movement to regulate "natural monopolies" in economic life	
Kenneth Adelman	1967	Deputy ambassador to the United Nations, Director of the Arms Control and Disarmament Agency, National Editor of Washingtonian magazine	
Florin Cîțu	1996	Prime minister of Romania (2020–2021)	
Tom Cole	1971	Representative from Oklahoma, Chairman of the National Republican Congressional Committee	
Frank W. Cyr	1923 (transferred)	Professor at Teachers College, Columbia University, "father of the yellow school bus"	
Richard Edwards		University administrator and professor of economics	
Hallie Flanagan	1911	Director of the Federal Theater Project; first woman to win a Guggenheim	
John Garang	1969	Vice president of Sudan, leader of the rebel Sudan People's Liberation Army	
Daniel Grossberg	2006	Kentucky state representative	
Chris Hall	2007	Iowa state representative	
Harry Hopkins	1912	WPA administrator and architect of the New Deal	
Sen Katayama	1892	Co-founder of the Japan Communist Party	
William Squire Kenyon	1890	Senator from Iowa and judge of the United States Court of Appeals for the Eighth Circuit	
George Moose	1966	Assistant secretary of state for African affairs, ambassador to Benin and Senegal	
Tom Railsback	1954	Representative from Illinois	
Charles A. Rawson		Senator from Iowa	
Ezra P. Savage		Twelfth governor of Nebraska and tenth lieutenant governor of Nebraska	
Chase Strangio	2004	Deputy director for Transgender Justice at the American Civil Liberties Union, included in 2020's Time 100 most influential people in the world	
Greg Thielmann	1972	Intelligence analyst for the United States Department of State and critic of the 2003 invasion of Iraq	
Otha Wearin	1924	Representative from Iowa	
Joseph Welch	1914	Head attorney for the United States Army during the Army-McCarthy Hearings	
Alan Wheat	1972	Representative from Missouri	
George A. Wilson	1904	Senator from Iowa, governor of Iowa	
Henry Wingate	1969	Chief judge, United States District Court for the Southern District of Mississippi	
K. C. Wu	1923	Governor of Taiwan Province, mayor of Shanghai	

== Journalists and media personalities ==
Name	Class year	Notability	Reference
Gary Giddins	1970	Jazz columnist for The Village Voice	
Soleil Ho	2009	Food writer and restaurant critic for the San Francisco Chronicle	
Ben Jacobs	2006	Political reporter for The Guardian	
Walter Jacobson	1959	Chicago news personality	
Frederick Wilhelm Kaltenbach	c1918 (did not graduate)	English-language Nazi propagandist during World War II	
Adam Kempenaar	1997	Host of podcast and public radio show Filmspotting	
Sarah Mirk	2008	Bitch Media, Portland Mercury	
Armando Montaño	2012	Associated Press	
Albert Shaw	1879	Co-owner of the Grinnell Herald, journalist, and editor of the American edition of The Review of Reviews	
Roberta Smith	1969	Art critic for The New York Times	

== Literature, writing, and translation ==
Name	Class year	Notability	Reference
Amy Clampitt	1941	Poet and author	
David Feldman	1971	Author of the Imponderables series of books	
James Norman Hall	1910	Author, best known for Mutiny on the Bounty	
Edward Hirsch	1972	Poet, president of the John Simon Guggenheim Memorial Foundation	
Sterling Lord	1942	Literary agent, founder of Sterling Lord Literistic	
Sequoia Nagamatsu	2004	Author of How High We Go in the Dark	
Marshall Poe	1984	Historian, author, founder of MemoryArchive	
H. N. Swanson	1922	First editor of College Humor, well-known Hollywood literary agent	
Sam Tanenhaus	1977	Historian, journalist and biographer of Whittaker Chambers	
Ali Benjamin	1992	Author and finalist for the 2015 National Book Award	
Alexi Zentner	1995	Canadian short story writer and novelist, winner of O. Henry Prize	

== Medicine ==
Name	Class year	Notability	Reference
Eric E. Whitaker	1987	Executive vice president, Strategic Affiliations; associate dean, Community-Based Research, University of Chicago; internal medicine physician	

== Military ==
Name	Class year	Notability	Reference
Norman F. Bates	1865	Medal of Honor recipient	
Russell A. Berg	1940	U.S. Air Force brigadier general	

== Social reform ==
Name	Class year	Notability	Reference
Dana W. Bartlett	1882	Congregationalist minister, author	
Bruce Friedrich	1996	Senior policy director for Farm Sanctuary	
Bernice King	1985	Minister, daughter of Martin Luther King Jr. (transferred to Spelman College)	
Louise Noun	1929	Feminist activist, civil libertarian, author	
George Edward White	1882	American Congregationalist missionary, president of Anatolia College, witness to the Armenian genocide	
Shelley White-Means	1977	Health economist who works to reduce health disparities in Memphis, Tennessee	

== Sports ==
Name	Class year	Notability	Reference
Harris Coggeshall	1929	Tennis player, runner-up in doubles in the 1930 National Clay Court Championships and the 1929 National Indoor Championship, runner-up in the 1928 Cincinnati Masters	
Hap Moran	1926	All-Pro football halfback for the New York Giants	
Ian Shoemaker	1996	College football coach	
Morgan Taylor	1926	Track and field hurdler, gold medalist for the U.S. in the 1924 Summer Olympics	
Christine Thorburn	1992	Cyclist, two-time Olympian for the U.S.	

== Technology ==
Name	Class year	Notability	Reference
Nathaniel Borenstein	1980	Designer of the MIME protocol for sending multimedia e-mail	
Robert Noyce	1949	Co-founder of Intel, co-inventor of integrated circuit, recipient of National Medal of Science	
Dana Ulery	1959	Chief scientist for the Army Research Laboratory computing sciences	
