= Nancy Kricorian =

American writer (born 1960)

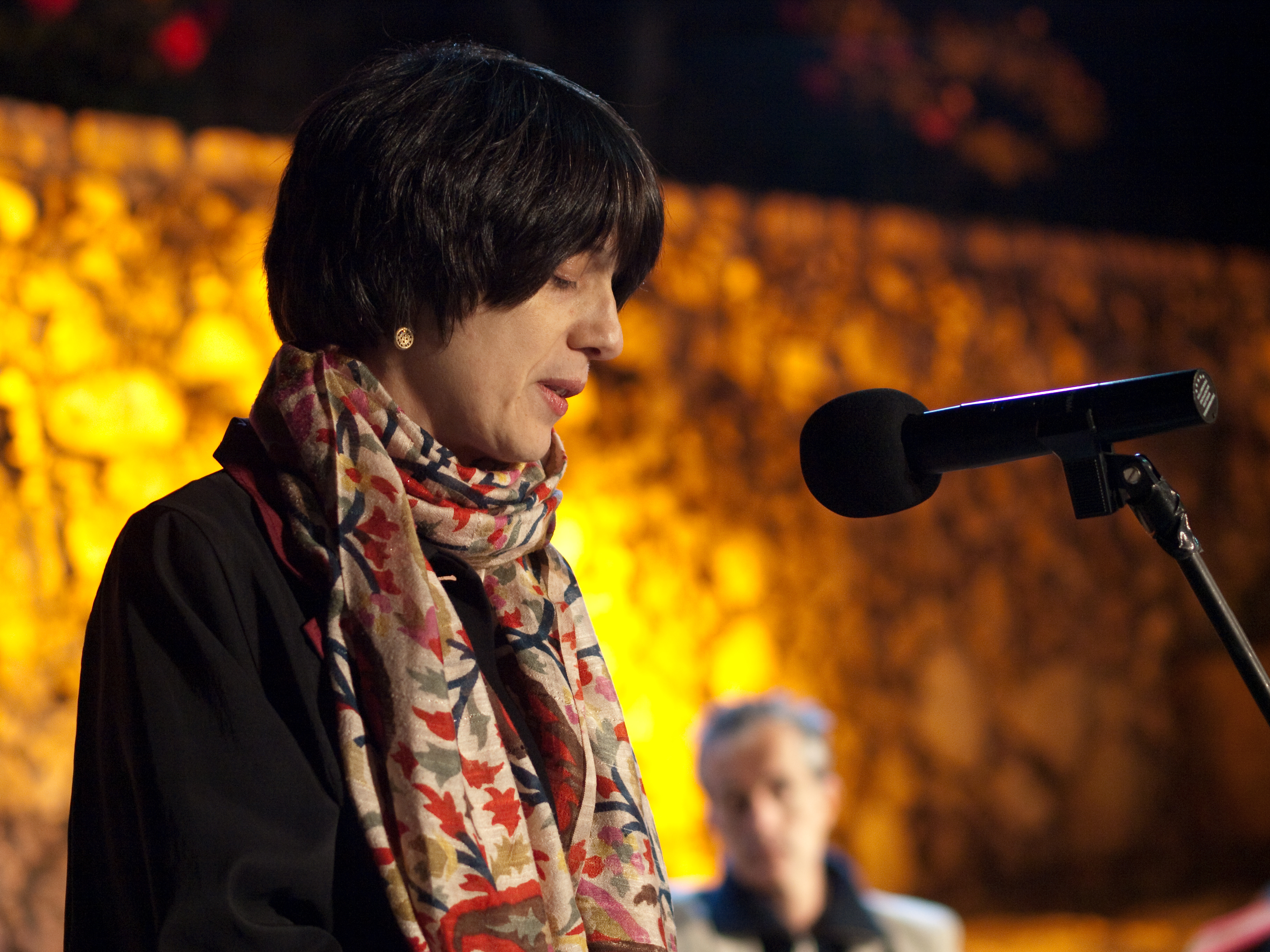
- Born: September 19, 1960 (age 65); Watertown, Massachusetts, U.S.
- Education: Dartmouth College (BA); Columbia University (MFA)
- Occupations: Poet and writer
- Spouse: James Schamus
- Children: 2
- Writing career
- Genres: Poetry and novels
- Website: nancykricorian.net

Nancy Jean Kricorian (born September 19, 1960) is an American author of the novels Zabelle (1997), Dreams of Bread and Fire (2003)., All the Light There Was (2013), and The Burning Heart of the World (2025). Her novels center on the Armenian diaspora and the aftermath of the Armenian genocide, for which she has received the Anahid Literary Award and a Gold Medal from the Writers Union of Armenia.

== Personal life and career ==
Kricorian was born in Watertown, Massachusetts, the daughter of Irene (Gelinas), a child care provider, and Edward L. Kricorian, a meatcutter. She is of Armenian descent on the paternal side and French-Canadian descent on the maternal side. Her grandmother's family was almost annihilated during the Armenian genocide with only her grandmother and a younger brother surviving. Kricorian stated in an interview that her non-conformity started during her childhood as she recalled: "One time I was having a fight with my father and he said, 'Now you don't talk to me like that'. And I responded 'I'm going to talk and I'm going to talk and you can't stop me'. That is a kind of resistance, they are telling me to shut up, lie down, go shopping, no, I don't want to".

In a 2013 interview, Kricorian described her youth as: "I grew up in the Armenian community. I grew up in a two-family house in Watertown, Massachusetts; on the block where I grew up half the families were Armenian. I went to the Armenian church, and a third of my classmates at school were Armenian. I really was in the community and then I desperately wanted to get out of there, I wanted to get away, so when I went to college I thought, you know, "I'm escaping," but then somehow it ended up that that is somewhere my imagination went. I ended up in this "home" place.""

Kricorian graduated from Dartmouth College in 1982 and gained a Master of Fine Arts degree from Columbia University in 1987. She is a poet who has taught at Yale, Queens College, Rutgers, and Columbia. By her own account, she hated New York when she first arrived in 1984, and by she came to like the city in stages, settling in the city's intellectual district. The Syrian-born Canadian-Armenian writer Hrag Vartanian described her: "By her own admission Nancy Kricorian is an intellectual. A recognized poet, she is more popularly known as a novelist with two books that give voice to distinctly Armenian-American sensibilities". In her poem My Armenia she wrote: "Armenia is a country where someone is always crying, Women punch in and out on the clock, grieving in shifts, 1895, 1915, 1921, the thirties, 1988, 1992, 1993, 1994..."

She is a former member of the editorial board of Ararat Quarterly the advisory board of the Armenia Tree Project, and is a NAASR member.

Kricorian is married to producer and screenwriter James Schamus. Schamus is on the board of directors of the group Jewish Voices for Peace. Schamus and Kricorian live in New York and have two daughters.

== Literary works ==
=== Zabelle (1998) ===
Her first novel, Zabelle (1998), concerned the legacy of the Armenian genocide, which she took six years to write. Zabelle was one of several novels and memoirs by the Armenian-American writers such as Rise the Euphrates (1994) by Carol Edgarian and The Black Dog of Fate (1997) by Peter Balakian that appeared in the late 20th century dealing with the matter of the Armenian genocide, which had been a subject that had long been ignored in American literature. In the novel, Toros Chahasbanian, the husband of the narrator confesses to her his shame at his passivity during the genocide as he states: "I watched the whole thing and did nothing. God will never forgive me". Vartanian wrote Kricorian's novels concern female characters with "huge appetites" for wanting to explore and enjoy the world who are usually faced with some moral dilemma. Vartanian wrote: "In her novels, moral dilemmas are carefully dissected, but they are always become fragments of larger systems, which does not make for easy morality. Kricorian's characters don't dally or naval gaze, they are sometimes curt, often direct, and always emotionally present, even when they are confronted with something as horrific as genocide...". In Zabelle, the narrator says: "I remember what it was like to be a child-you see the world in pieces". The line reflects Kricorian's interest how memories affect people. Kricorian stated: "I don't think [Zabelle] sees the whole world, but as an adult you can make connections between the different scenes and impressions you can't do as a child. This perception had to do with watching one of my daughters, who seemed to have a map of the world in her head that was quite sophisticated in some small patches, but there were gaping chasms between these areas of knowledge". The narrator says of her youth: "we didn't speak of those times, but they were like dead and rotting animals behind the walls of our house", reflecting Kricorian's belief that the genocide had done lasting harm to the Armenians.

=== Dreams of Bread and Fire (2003) ===
Her second novel, Dreams of Bread and Fire (2003) also concerned the legacy of the Armenian Genocide and the Holocaust as well as a half-Jewish, half-Armenian young American woman named Ani Silver confronts the suffering on both the paternal and maternal sides of her family during a lengthy trip to Paris. Ani is a university student engaged to Asa Willard, a fellow university student from a wealthy Boston Brahmin family, and departs for Paris, only for Asa to abruptly terminate the relationship. Feeling heartbroken, Ani chooses to stay in Paris, where she meets Van Ardavanian. The character of Van, Ani's Armenian revolutionary boyfriend, serves as form of resistance to the way that the Turkish state denies that the Armenian Genocide ever took place, but Vartanian noted: "...it is Ani's story that is the true act of subversive resistance-the young woman carves out her own unpackaged identity". Van turns out to be a member of the Armenian Secret Army for the Liberation of Armenia, a group considered to be a terrorist organization by the governments of the United States and Turkey. Kricorian stated: "I feel that even in the Armenian community when I was working on my second book [and wrote about the Armenian "terrorist"], they were like, 'Oh, the Turks say Armenians are terrorists, you can't write about that, you are just playing into their hands'. I think life is complicated and there are all different kinds of people doing different things and it is fascinating how people make the decisions they make, and I want to write about that". In a review in the Los Angeles Times, Susan Salter Reynolds wrote that in Dreams of Bread and Fire: "Kricorian does for young women what James Joyce did for middle aged men, she allows us to scramble safely amid the debris of new love, rejection, sex, and identity."

=== All the Light There Was (2013) ===
Inspired by the French documentary Des terroristes à la retraite (Terrorists In Retirement), Kricorian began writing All the Light There Was, a novel set in Paris during what the French call les années noires ("the Dark Years", i.e the German occupation of 1940–44). Through the film, she learned of the story of Missak Manouchian, the Armenian military commander of the FTP-MOI resistance group that consisted of immigrants to France, the largest number of which were Jews from Eastern Europe. Kricorian also first learned of the Affiche Rouge ("Red Poster") from Des terroristes à la retraite that appeared all over France starting on February 21, 1944 bearing the photographs of Manouchian and other executed FTP-MOI members. Kricorian was especially struck by the marginal status of the individuals featured in the Affiche Rouge, noting a number of them were stateless people who had been stripped of their citizenship for being Jewish. In turn, she was inspired to write a novel set in the mostly Armenian immigrant working class Paris neighborhood of Belleville during the Occupation. Kricorian believes that American society has been deadened by consumerism and materialism into apathy and indifference to social problems, saying "They want us to watch TV and shop". She sees her novels as a way of awakening the world to pressing social and political questions. Kricorian stated: "I write from my obsessions. Right now, I am writing about Armenians because that stimulates my imagination...Part of the reason I'm feeling politically engaged is because of the research I have been doing for my book". Kricorian admitted her work on her novel was slowed down by her activism as she joined the New York chapter of the feminist pacifist group Code Pink and stated "I devoted the six months leading up to the 2004 U.S presidential election to unseating the junta". The term "the junta" is the phrase used by left-wing Armenian-Americans to describe Republican administrations.

Inspired by the story of the FTP-MOI, Kricorian's novel All the Light There Was concerned how a group of Armenians and Jews living in Paris banded together to form a resistance group against the Nazis. However, the book's protagonist, the teenager Maral Pegorian, was not involved in the Resistance as Kricorian stated: "I really wanted it to be how did an ordinary girl survive and live through this experience, and how do you stay humane and how do you live your daily life?" Kricorian performed much research for her book, interviewing a number of Franco-Armenians who lived through the Occupation. One of the people she interviewed was Arsène Tchakarian, an Armenian who served as a FTP-MOI assassin and who was the last surviving member of the FTP-MOI. Kricorian wrote that it took her ten years to write the novel because:

"In order to recreate the atmosphere of the working class neighborhood of Belleville during the period the French refer to as Les Années Noires (The Dark Years), I read voluminously from histories, journals, collections of letters, and novels penned during and immediately after the war years. I went to Paris to tour the lycée that my narrator and protagonist Maral Pegorian had attended, and to interview octogenarian and nonagenarian Parisian Armenians who had lived through the war. Through the research, several salient material details were impressed upon me again and again: during the Occupation ordinary people were hungry most of the time, during the four winters under Nazi rule Paris apartments were generally without heat, and Parisians were often in the dark both literally and metaphorically. Germany used France as its wartime breadbasket, making off with the lion's share of French butter, milk, wheat, vegetables, fruit and meat. Food was rationed and even with ration tickets in hand shoppers were often unable to procure their due. Rutabagas and turnips, which had been used before the war as cattle fodder, were now a staple of French cuisine. The Germans also requisitioned French coal and other fuel, leaving Paris apartments unheated in winter. Nighttime blackouts meant the streets were dark and curfews often kept people in their homes after nightfall...While I was writing, I traveled back in time and across the ocean to Occupied Paris. I could not only hear the voices of my characters, but I could also feel the cold air seeping in the cracks around the window frames, and smell the dreaded rutabagas cooking in the kitchen. I fretted with Maral over her lack of bath soap, and shared the frustration of her cobbler father about his inability to get leather. But it wasn't until the day that my husband asked me why we had seven jars of mustard in the pantry that I realized how deep this shared experience had gone."

Kricorian wrote that she had come to identify with her characters so much that she had unconsciously started to stockpile the food that the Pegorian family had missed under the Occupation.

Kricorian intended her novel in part to be an act of political criticism as the FTP-MOI were banded as "terrorists" by Vichy France and as "Judeo-Bolshevik terrorists" by Nazi Germany, and are today remembered as heroic Resistance fighters, which led her to see parallels with modern politics. Kricorian further intended another parallel with the way that Armenian resistance groups under the Ottoman empire were banded as "terrorists" by the Ottoman state, which was used as excuse for anti-Armenian policies. Kricorian also examined the controversial subject of collaboration as she also incorporated into her novel the story of the Armenian Legion of the Wehrmacht that was recruited from Soviet Armenian POWs to fight for the Third Reich, a story that she found to be very bizarre, through she noted that many of the Armenian Red Army POWs who joined the Armenian Legion did so as a way to avoid starving to death in German POW camps [between June 1941–March 1942, about 2 million Soviet POWs starved to death in German POW camps]. However, she found it inspiring how the singer Charles Aznavour and other Franco-Armenians encouraged the soldiers of the Armenian Legion to desert, and offered to shelter them. The Wehrmacht had a strict policy that desertion was to be punished with either death or service in the dreaded penal battalions, which was tantamount to a death service; and likewise encouraging someone to desert from the Wehrmacht was also punishable by death. Kricorian wrote in a 2012 essay: "Charles Aznavour, 19 at the time, was responsible for the nighttime task of dumping the deserters' boots and uniforms into the sewers of Paris."

=== Other works ===
At present, Kricorian is working on a novel concerning an ethnic Armenian family in Beirut during the Lebanese Civil War of 1975–1990.

Her work was part of the Bush Theatre's 2011 project Sixty Six Books for which she wrote a piece based upon Ecclesiastes, a book of the Bible.

== Activism ==
=== Anti-war activism ===
On International Woman's Day in 2003, she attended an anti-war protest outside of the office of Senator Hillary Clinton, which led her to become involved in the anti-war group Code Pink. In a 2005 essay she wrote for Code Pink, she endorsed what she calls direct action as a means of social change. She defined direct action as the "...political tactic of confrontation and sometimes-illegal disruption intended to attract and arouse public awareness and action. The Montgomery Bus Boycott in 1955 was an example of direct action that was successful in ending seating segregation on public buses...Street theater...involves the acting out of a social issue in a public space...Civil disobedience, which is another form of direct action, involves the nonviolent act of breaking the law to call attention to a particular law or set of laws that some people think are immoral or questionable. An example of civil disobedience from the Civil Rights Movement was the “sit-in” campaign by African-American students in the South". Kricorian feels that direct action is necessary as she believes that the American media is under the control of large corporations allied to the U.S government that preach a message of militarism to the American people. In an interview in December 2005, Kricorian stated she was opposed to the Iraq war and was involved in Code Pink because: "Women and children suffer most during times of war. Women often have better skills of listening and negotiation than men do. But the reason I like CodePink is I'm working with a group of dedicated, passionate, articulate women, and there isn't a lot of posturing or ego stroking involved".

She was the coordinator of CODEPINK New York City from 2003 to 2010, and is currently on the national staff of CODEPINK Women for Peace. She was the fall 2015 writer-in-residence at the Hagop Kevorkian Center for Near Eastern Studies at New York University, and a fellow of Women Mobilizing Memory project at Columbia University's Center for the Study of Social Difference.

=== United States politics ===
In the 2008 election, she endorsed Barack Obama for president, writing in a joint essay together with several other feminists that Hillary Clinton's record as a senator who voted repeatedly for increased defense spending and for the congressional resolution authorizing the war in Iraq in October 2002 made her in their opinion unsuitable to be president.

In 2011, she supported the Occupy Wall Street protests. In an interview on October 28, 2011, Kricorian stated that her belief that "voting no longer represents democracy" as she believes that the rich have corrupted the politicians and that she hopes that "the wealthy realize that their well-being is dependent on the health and happiness of the 99 percent." She added that she believes: "Our country has been bankrupted by colonial wars and occupations while local needs, such as education, healthcare, and physical infrastructure, have been starved of needed resources. The anti-war movement, of which I have been a part since early 2003, was practically eviscerated by the hope of 'Yes We Can,' but now people have realized that [President Barack] Obama can't and won't unless the people push him harder than the wealthy one percent have been doing". Kriocrian took part in the marches and demonstrations in Zuccotti Park and brought one of her daughters for the marches.

On December 4, 2014, she took part in a march in New York to protest several police killings of Afro-Americans, most notably Eric Garner, and declared her support for Black Lives Matter.

In August 2020, she joined the group Writers Against Trump that campaigned against President Donald Trump in the 2020 presidential election as the group stated: "We believe that this presidency is uniquely dangerous to our present and future society." In October 2020, she signed a public letter together with a number of other Armenian-Americans accusing the American media of being biased towards Azerbaijan with regard to the Nagorno-Karabakh war by wrongfully accusing Armenia of starting the war. The letter stated: "Armenia is a country smaller than the population of Los Angeles – an approximate population of three million Armenians who are largely descendants of the 1915 Armenian Genocide. Artsakh [Nagorno-Karabakh] has a population of only 150,000. Today, the two nations of Turkey and Azerbaijan have a combined population of more than 90 million and have supplemented their fighters with mercenary forces from Syria and Libya hired by a Turkish contracting company. Both Turkey and Azerbaijan have a history of committing genocide and pogroms against Armenians in the twentieth century, while also being more significantly armed with the world's most sophisticated weaponry." The letter speculated that the vast oil wealth of Azerbaijan together with the pro-Azerbaijani stance of Turkey was influencing the American media's coverage of the war.

=== Armenian genocide ===
After a visit to Turkey in July 2014, Kriocrian stated that she felt it was a form of resistance against the efforts of the Turkish state to deny the Armenian genocide, On April 24, 2015, Kricorian gave a speech at Galatasary Square in Istanbul commentating the 100th anniversary of the beginning of the Armenian genocide, which started on April 24, 1915 when the orders were given from the Central Committee of the Committee for Union and Progress to kill all of the Armenians living in the Ottoman empire. Kriocrian spoke before a mixed audience of Armenians and Turks, arguing that no reconciliation was possible until the Republic of Turkey finally admitted that the Ottoman empire had waged genocide against the Armenians. Kricorian argued against the concept of "dialogue", which she felt was a subtle form of genocide denial as it implied that the fact of the genocide should be a subject of discussion and debate and that the position of the Turkish state that the genocide never occurred was just as valid as the Armenian position that the genocide did place; instead, she called for "co-resistance", urging Armenian and Turkish feminists to work together. The site of Galatasary Square was chosen because it is the location of weekly protest rallies against state violence against women in Turkey, and the Turkish feminist organizers of the rally saw a link between the state violence against Armenians in the Ottoman empire and the present-day misogynous violence in Turkey. Kricorian supports recognition of the Armenian genocide by the United States; a controversial position as the Turkish government has lobbied strongly against such recognition.

=== Israel/Palestine ===
In November 2014, she wrote the article "That Country Beyond Our Reach" in the Wasafiri journal. She wrote that she felt an affinity for the Palestinian cause and compared Al-Naqba (Arabic for "the catastrophe", the term the Palestinians use to describe the founding of Israel in 1948) with the Armenian genocide in terms of impact on the respective communities. Kricorian wrote that "...the Palestinian experience is a familiar one of suffering and dispossession, but also of resilience and tenacity". She cited Theodor W. Adorno's remark that writing can be a way to recreate a lost homeland, which is why she felt that the Palestinian community had produced so many writers whose books deal with the themes of loss and exile. Kriocrian defines herself as a "Palestine solidarity activist". She supports boycotting Israel and in particular is against the Israeli cosmetic company Ahava, which operates a factory in the West Bank by the shores of the Dead Sea, where it extracts minerals it uses for its skin care products. In April 2016, Ahava was purchased for $77 million US dollars by the Chinese corporation Fosun, which led Kricorian to state that the sale to Fosun "signifies that Ahava's brand was so tainted because of the prolonged international boycott against them that they were unable to find investors in the United States or Europe".

In a 2021 article, she accused certain Israelis of harnessing Armenian Orthodox priests and monks in the Armenian Quarter of Jerusalem. In May 2021, Kricorian organized a petition criticizing the treatment of Israeli Palestinians by the Israeli government in the city of Lod (called Lydda by the Palestinians). She told the journalist Valentina Di Liscia: "We were contacted by Palestinian friends who were feeling personally endangered. There have been roving gangs of extremists that have been pulling Palestinians out of cars, attacking their shops, breaking into their homes. What's so scary is that the Israeli police and army don't stop them." The petition was signed by over a 1,000 American intellectuals, the best known of whom were Molly Crabapple, Rehab Nazzal, Judith Butler, Angela Davis; Rachel Kushner and Ottessa Moshfegh.

== Memberships ==
- Women Mobilizing Memory Fellow at The Center for the Study of Social Difference, Columbia University (2013–2017)
- PEN American Center (2003)
- Ararat Literary Quarterly Editorial Board (1998–2004)
- Armenia Tree Project Executive Committee (2001–2016)
- CODEPINK Women for Peace (2003–2016)
- Board of the National Association of Armenian Studies and Research (2016)

== Honors and awards ==
- Writer in Residence, Kevorkian Center for Near East Studies, New York University, Fall
- 2015
- Gold Medal of the Writers Union of Armenia, 2007
- Anahid Literary Award, The Armenian Center at Columbia University, 1998
- Ararat Short Story Prize, 1997
- Daniel Varoujan Prize, New England Poetry Club, 1995
- Residency, Yaddo, Saratoga Springs, N.Y., January 1991
- Educational Press Award, Editorial Category, 1991
- Judith's Room Emerging Talent Prize, 1990
- River Styx Poetry Prize, 1990
- Fellowship, New York Foundation for the Arts, 1988
- Tuition Scholarship, School of Criticism and Theory, 1988
- Academy of American Poets Prize, Columbia, 1987
- Residency, Karolyi Foundation, Vence, France, Summer 1986
- Finalist, Benjamin Burns Poetry Contest, Columbia, 1985
- Graduate Writing Fellowship, Columbia, 1985
- Claire Woolrich Scholarship, Columbia, 1984
- Dartmouth Graduate Fellowship to the University of Paris, 1983–1984
- Phi Beta Kappa, Dartmouth, 1982
- Senior Fellowship, Creative Writing, Dartmouth, 1981
- The Alexander Laing Poetry Prize, Dartmouth, 1980 and 1981

== Publications ==
=== Fiction ===
- All the Light There Was, Houghton Mifflin Harcourt (hardcover) March 2013; She Writes Press (paperback) October 2014
- Dreams of Bread and Fire, Grove Press (hardcover), May 2003,
- (paperback) April 2004
- Dreams of Bread and Fire foreign editions: Aras (Turkey, Nov. 2017);
- Editions Thaddée (France, forthcoming)
- "The Tin Cup," excerpt from Zabelle, Salamander Magazine, Vol. 6, No. 2, 1999
- Zabelle, novel, Atlantic Monthly Press (hardcover), January 1998 and Bard/Avon
- (paperback), March 1999 (later a HarperPerennial title); paperback reissued by Grove, September 2009.
- Zabelle foreign editions: Machborot (Israel, Nov. 98), Piper (Germany, Aug. 98), Gyldendal (Denmark, June 98), Vassallucci (The Netherlands, April 98), Writers Union of Armenia (Armenia, Dec. 07), Belge (Turkey, Feb. 08)
- "The Balcony," short story, Ararat, Fall 1997
- "Armenian Eyes," short story, Ararat, Spring 1991

=== Non-fiction ===
- Kricorian, Nancy (Spring 2006). "Code Pink Women For Peace". Women's Studies Quarterly. 34 (1): 532–533.
- Kricorian, Nancy (November 2014). "That Country Beyond Our Reach Palestinian Fiction Since 1967". Wasafiri. 29 (4): 8–14. doi:10.1080/02690055.2014.946669. S2CID 162115912.

== Books and articles ==
- Abiral, Bürge; Altmay, Ayṣe Gül; Çalişkan, Dilara; Yildiz, Armanc (2019). "Mobilizing Memory Through Collective Walking and Storytelling In Istanbul". In Alisa Solomon; Ayşe Gül Altınay; Banu Karaca; Jean Howard; Marianne Hirsch; María José Contreras (eds.). Women Mobilizing Memory. New York: Columbia University Press. pp. 84–104. ISBN 9780231549974.
- Anderson, Frances; Eisenberg, Carolyn; Fried, Marlene; Gordon, Linda; LeBlanc, Judith; Kricorian, Nancy; Migdal, Eliza (2010). "Feminists for Obama". In Beverly Guy-Sheftall, Johnnetta Betsch Cole (ed.). Who Should Be First?: Feminists Speak Out on the 2008 Presidential Campaign. New York: SUNY Press. pp. 11–12. ISBN 978-1438433738.
- Vartanian, Hrag (2007). "Nancy Kricorian, Writer". In Huberta von Voss (ed.). Portraits of Hope Armenians in the Contemporary World. New York: Berghahn Books. pp. 99–103. ISBN 9781845452575.; first published as Schwierige Wahrheiten: Die Schriftstellerin Nancy Kricorian in Porträt einer Hoffnung Die Armenier edited by Huberta von Voss, Verlag Hans Schiller, 2004.
