= Maxine Hayes =

American public health expert

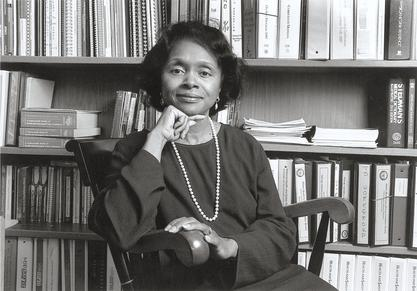
- Born: 1946 (age 79–80); Mississippi
- Education: State University of New York; Spelman College; Harvard University
- Medical career
- Profession: Health Officer
- Institutions: University of Mississippi Medical Center; Washington State Department of Health

Maxine D. Hayes (born 1946) is an American public health expert who was the State Health Officer for Washington state from 1998 until 2013. She was elected to the National Academy of Medicine in 2006 and awarded the American Public Health Association Martha May Eliot Award.

== Early life and education ==
Hayes grew up Mississippi in the Jim Crow south. She was an undergraduate student in biology at Spelman College. She spent 1967 as a Merrill Scholar on a year abroad in Vienna, at the same time as Shirley F. Marks and where she said she first felt free of segregation. To prepare herself for a year of non-English tuition, she spent the summer before her year abroad on an intense German course, and lived with a German family who did not speak any English. During her year in Vienna, Martin Luther King Jr. and Robert F. Kennedy Jr. were assassinated. When she returned to the United States the civil rights movement had ended, and new opportunities were open for African-American people. Hayes has said, “Prior to going overseas, I couldn’t imagine ever going to medical school. African Americans were not accepted into graduate school disciplines,”. She moved to the School of Medicine at the University at Buffalo, where she worked toward a medical degree. She chose to attend the University at Buffalo because of the Roswell Park Comprehensive Cancer Center.

== Research and career ==
Hayes trained in paediatrics at the Vanderbilt University Medical Center and the Boston Children's Hospital. Once she had completed her specialist training, Hayes joined Harvard T.H. Chan School of Public Health, where she completed a Master's in Public Health. She worked with the University of Massachusetts Medical School Project COPE, which looked to provide healthcare to the mothers of babies born in prison.

Hayes was made a teaching fellow at the University of Mississippi Medical Center in 1977, where she would eventually serve on the Disease Control Advisory Committee for Immunization Practices. She moved to Washington in 1985, where she was appointed medical director of a Children's Clinic that supported Seattle's low income population. A few years later, Hayes joined the Washington State Department of Health, where she was made State Health Officer in 1998. She held this position until 2013, working to advise governments of influenza outbreaks and public-health issues. She serves on the board of Healthy Food America.

== Awards and honors ==
- 1967 Charles Merrill Jr. Scholarship, Vienna 1967-68
- 2002 Nathan Davis Award for Outstanding Government Service
- 2017 American Public Health Association Martha May Eliot Award

== Selected publications ==
- Jeffrey R Botkin; Steven M Teutsch; Celia I Kaye; et al. (1 April 2010). "Outcomes of interest in evidence-based evaluations of genetic tests". Genetics in Medicine. 12 (4): 228–235. doi:10.1097/GIM.0B013E3181CDDE04. ISSN 1098-3600. PMID 20118789. Wikidata Q37684710.
- Mary Ann Baily; William Becker; Maxine Hayes; Ellen Wright Clayton; Scott Grosse (1 January 2005). "Exploring options for expanded newborn screening". The Journal of Law. 33 (4 Suppl): 46–48. ISSN 1073-1105. PMID 16689158. Wikidata Q57652752.
- Marian Weldin; Jane Hutchings; Maxine Hayes; Sharon McAllister; Cynthia Harris; Diana Larsen-Mills (1 December 2006). "Expanding access to emergency contraception through state systems: the Washington State experience". Perspectives on Sexual and Reproductive Health. 38 (4): 220–224. ISSN 1538-6341. PMID 17162314. Wikidata Q79426833.
