= Szilvia Molnar =

American writer

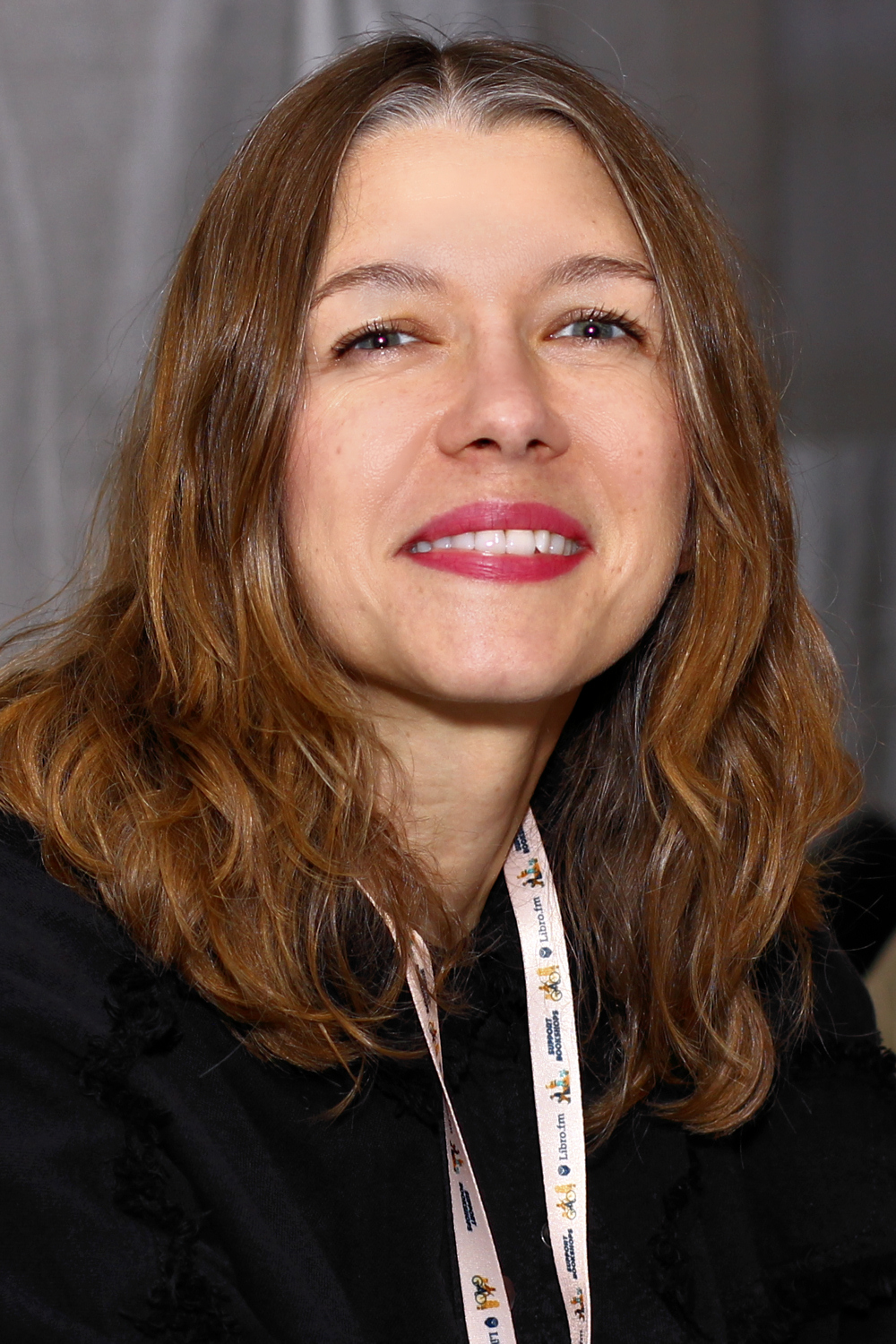
- Molnar at the 2023 Texas Book Festival
- Born: 1984 (age 41–42); Budapest, Hungary
- Occupation: Writer
- Children: 2
- Website: www.szilviamolnar.com

Szilvia Molnar (born 1984) is a Hungarian born American writer whose first novel The Nursery was released in 2023.

== Life ==
Molnar was born in 1984 in Budapest and raised in southern Sweden. She and her parents immigrated to Sweden around 1989 and still mostly speak Hungarian among themselves.

Molnar's family were working class, with her father employed as a machinist and her mother, who is Polish, as a nurse. When Molnar was a teenager, she won a short story competition run by Sveriges Radio. She later studied Hungarian and Eastern European literature in the United Kingdom and spent an exchange year in Hungary.

Molnar has worked in the publishing industry for nearly two decades, most recently as the foreign rights director for the Sterling Lord literary agency. Her novel The Nursery is autobiographical and inspired by her own postpartum experiences, with Molnar describing the story as her "attempt to explain the complex and conflicting emotions that can arise when motherhood is suddenly knocking at your door, like some pesky neighbour complaining that your baby is crying."

In addition to Sweden, Molnar has previously lived in London, Budapest and Brooklyn. She currently lives in Austin, Texas with her husband and two children.

== Writing career ==
Molnar made her writing debut in 2005 with works published in literary periodicals in Sweden and the United Kingdom. In 2006, she won a writing competition in Ordfront Magasin and an award for translating Imre Oravecz from Hungarian into Swedish.

Her chapbook Soft Split was released by Future Tense Books in 2016. The story follows "a nameless female protagonist as she escapes from her unfulfilling day-to-day into psychosexual dream states."

Molnar's debut novel The Nursery was released in 2023 by Oneworld in the United Kingdom and Pantheon Books in North America. In a review in The New York Times, Claire Dederer called The Nursery a "brilliant debut novel about a new mom falling apart within the four walls of her apartment" and added that the novel is "relentlessly quotable." In The Atlantic, Daphne Merkin called The Nursery "a powerful brew of a novel, emitting unpleasant sights, smells, and emotions that are rarely captured in print; it is frequently disquieting in its brutal, insistent candor."

Molnar's work has also appeared in Guernica, Literary Hub, Neue Rundschau and other literary magazines.

== Bibliography ==
- Soft Split, Future Tense Books, 2015, ISBN 9781892061768
- The Nursery, Pantheon Books, 2023. ISBN 9780593316849
