= Johann Gottfried Herder =

German philosopher, theologian, poet (1744–1803)

The Reverend Johann Gottfried Herder
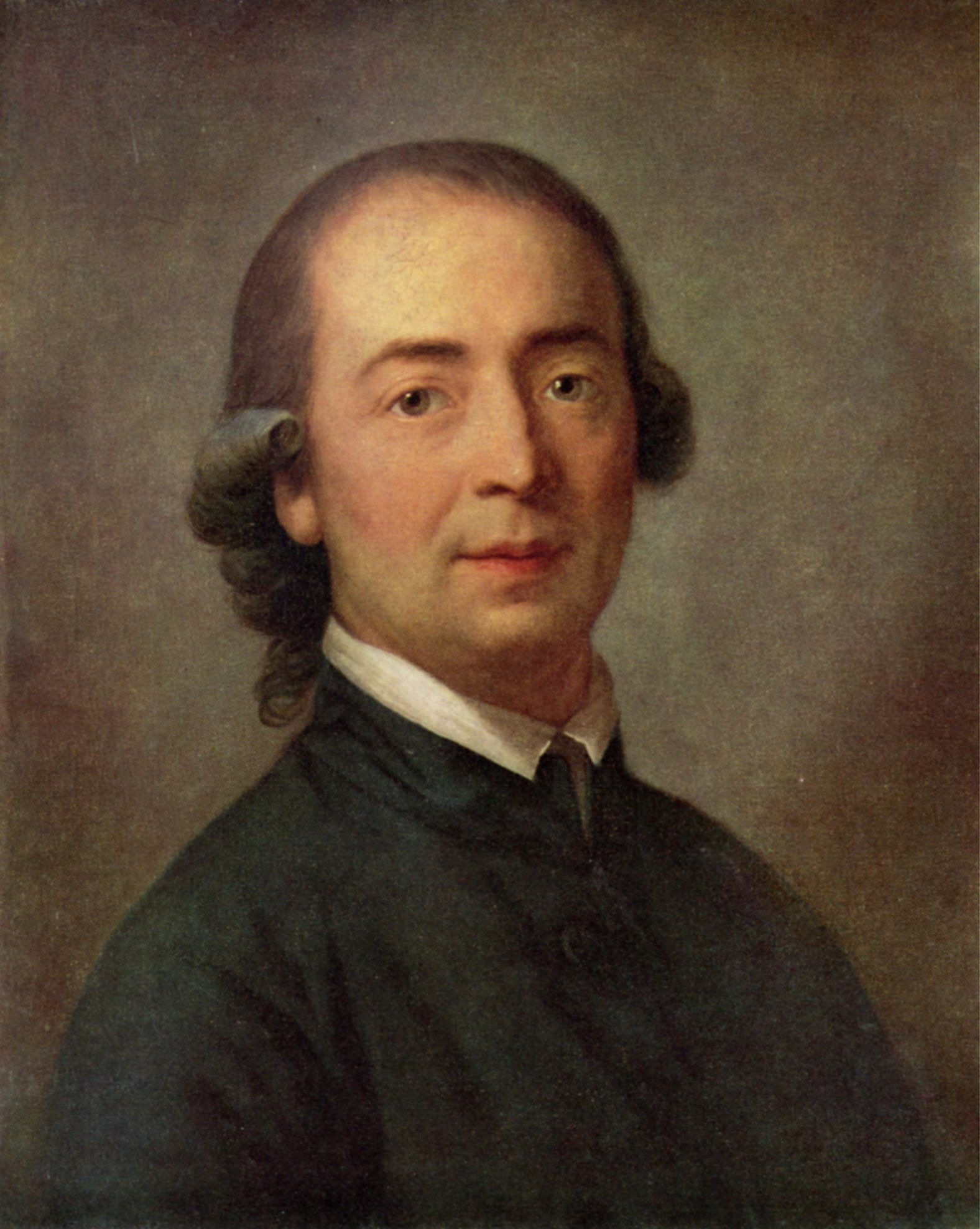
- 1785 painting
- Born: 25 August 1744; Mohrungen, Kingdom of Prussia
- Died: 18 December 1803 (aged 59); Weimar, Saxe-Weimar, Holy Roman Empire

Education
- Education: University of Königsberg
- Academic advisor: Immanuel Kant

Philosophical work
- Era: 18th-century philosophy
- Region: Western philosophy
- School: Enlightenment; Counter-Enlightenment; Romantic nationalism Anticolonialist cosmopolitanism Sturm und Drang; Weimar Classicism; Historicism; Romantic hermeneutics Classical liberalism
- Main interests: Philology, philosophy of language, cultural anthropology, philosophy of mind, aesthetics, philosophy of history, political philosophy, philosophy of religion
- Notable ideas: Thought as dependent on language Teleological conception of history Cultural relativism Volksgeist; Empirical approach to the investigation of languages and cultures

Johann Gottfried von Herder (/ˈhɜːrdər/ HUR-dər; German: [ˈjoːhan ˈɡɔtfʁiːt ˈhɛʁdɐ]; 25 August 1744 – 18 December 1803) was a German philosopher, theologian, pastor, poet, and literary critic. Herder is associated with the Age of Enlightenment, Sturm und Drang, and Weimar Classicism. He was a Romantic philosopher and poet who argued that true German culture was to be discovered among the common people (das Volk). He also stated that it was through folk songs, folk poetry, and folk dances that the true spirit of the nation (der Volksgeist) was popularized. He is credited with establishing or advancing a number of important disciplines: hermeneutics, linguistics, anthropology, and "a secular philosophy of history."

== Biography ==
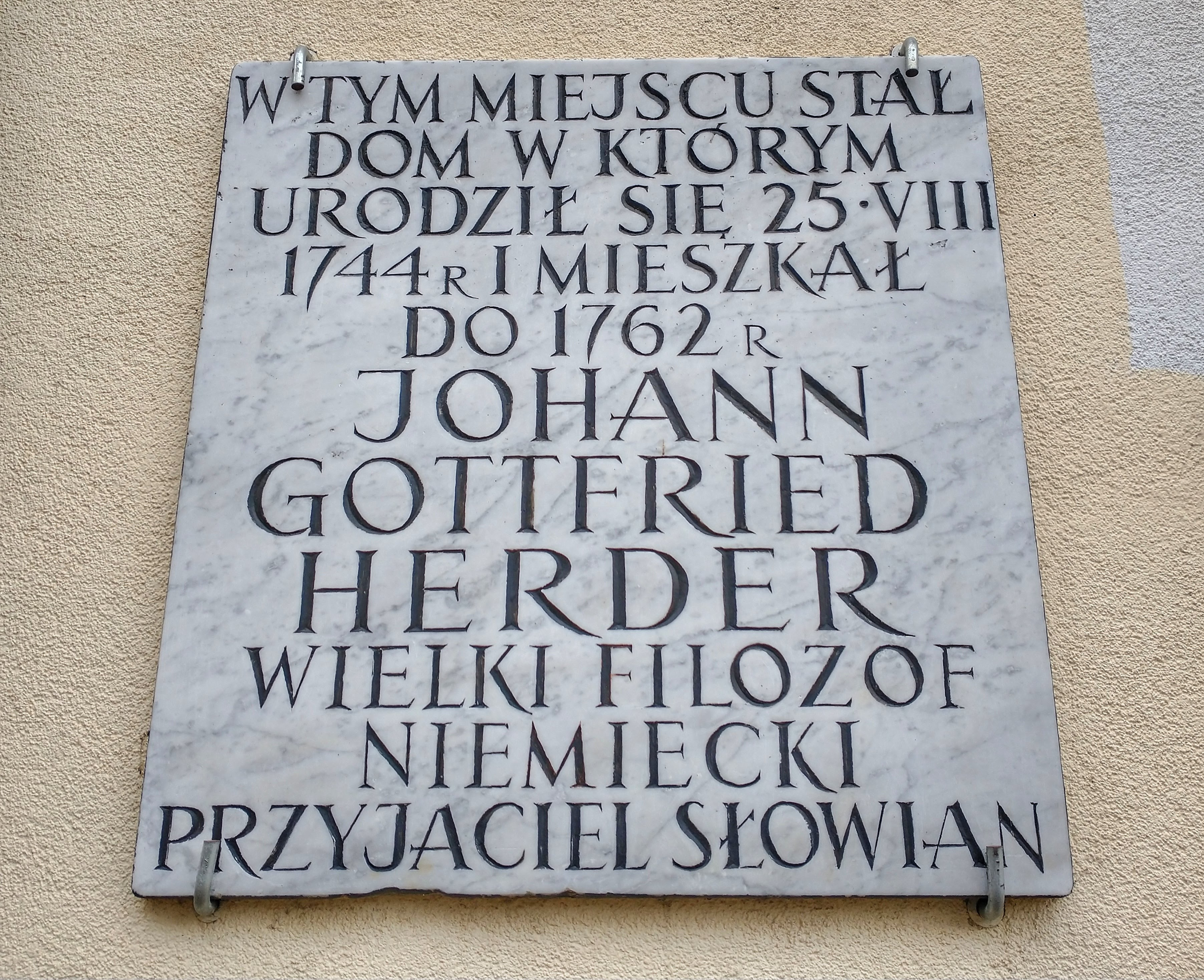
Memorial plaque at Herder's birthplace in Morąg, written in Polish

Herder was born in Mohrungen (now Morąg, Poland) in the Kingdom of Prussia. His parents were teacher Gottfried Herder (1706–1763) and his second wife Anna Elizabeth Herder, née Peltz (1717–1772). He grew up in a poor household, educating himself from his father's Bible and songbook. In 1762, as a youth of 17, he enrolled at the University of Königsberg, about 60 miles (100 km) north of Mohrungen, where he became a student of Immanuel Kant. At the same time, Herder became an intellectual protégé of Johann Georg Hamann, a Königsberg philosopher who disputed the claims of pure secular reason.

Hamann's influence led Herder to confess to his wife later in life that "I have too little reason and too much idiosyncrasy", yet Herder can justly claim to have founded a new school of German political thought. Although himself an unsociable person, Herder influenced his contemporaries greatly. One friend wrote to him in 1785, hailing his works as "inspired by God." A varied field of theorists were later to find inspiration in Herder's tantalizingly incomplete ideas.

In 1764, now a Lutheran pastor, Herder went to Riga to teach at a Lutheran school. It was during this period that he produced his first major works, which were literary criticism. In 1769 Herder traveled by ship to the French port of Nantes and continued on to Paris. After the trip he produced an account of his travels and experienced a shift in his own self-conception as an author. In September 1770, Herder went to Strasbourg, where he met the young Goethe, an event that proved to be a key juncture in the history of German literature, as Goethe was inspired by Herder's literary criticism to develop his own style. This can be seen as the beginning of the Sturm und Drang movement. In 1771, Herder took a position as head pastor and court preacher at Bückeburg under William, Count of Schaumburg-Lippe.

By the mid-1770s, Goethe, now a well-known author, used his influence at the court of Weimar to secure Herder a position as General Superintendent. Herder moved there in 1776, where his outlook shifted again towards classicism.

On 2 May 1773 Herder married Maria Karoline Flachsland (1750–1809) in Darmstadt. They had seven children: Wilhelm Gottfried (1774–1806), born in Bückeburg; Sigismund August (1776–1838), also born in Bückeburg; Wilhelm Ludwig Ernst (1778–1842); Karl Emil Adelbert (1779–1857), born in Weimar; Luise Thedore Emilie (1781–1860) also born in Weimar; Emil Ernst Gottfried (1783–1855); and Rinaldo Gottfried (b. 1790). All survived their childhood.

Towards the end of his career, Herder endorsed the French Revolution, thereby earning the enmity of many of his colleagues. At the same time, he and Goethe experienced a personal split. His unpopular attacks on Kantian philosophy were another reason for his isolation in later years.

In 1802 Herder was ennobled by the Elector-Prince of Bavaria, which added the prefix "von" to his last name. He died in Weimar in 1803 at age 59.

== Philosophy ==
Herder was influenced by his academic advisor Immanuel Kant, as well as seventeenth-century philosophers Spinoza and Leibniz. In turn, he influenced Hegel, Nietzsche, Goethe, Samuel Taylor Coleridge, John Stuart Mill, Karl Wilhelm Friedrich Schlegel, Wilhelm von Humboldt, Franz Boas, and Walter Rauschenbusch among others.

=== Language and cultural theory ===
Herder was one of the first to argue that language contributes to shaping the frameworks and the patterns with which each linguistic community thinks and feels. In 1772, Herder published Treatise on the Origin of Language. In it he defines language as "the natural organ of the understanding."

Even earlier, in 1768's Fragments on Recent German Literature, Herder explained that thought is fundamentally dependent on and delineated by language.

If it is true that we cannot think without thoughts, and learn to think through words, then language sets limits and outline for the whole of human cognition.

Herder has often been misinterpreted, however. Neither Herder nor the philosopher of language Wilhelm von Humboldt argue that language (written or oral) is strictly deterministic of thought. Nor did Herder equate or identify thought with language. Such a stronger version of the relation, as occasionally expressed by Hamann and the earlier Schleiermacher, is more subject to counterexamples. One may think without using language to express it, such as when holding an opinion without expressing it. And it is surely possible to speak or write something without thought, such as by expressing gibberish.

For Herder, the emphasis is on the interdependence between thought and language,

We think in language, whether we are explaining what is present or seeking what is not yet present. In the first case we transform perceptible sounds into intelligible words and intelligible words into clear concepts. Hence a matter can be dissected for as long as there are words for its component concepts, and an idea can be explained for as long as new connections of words set it in a clearer light. In the second case, which concerns the discovery of new truths, the discovery is often as much an unexpected consequence of various word connections as can be the product of various combinations of signs in algebra. And so what remarkable impressions can language not bury even into the deepest ground of the abstract sciences.

Herder clearly saw language as positive expression of the human faculties, where new words and new combinations of words could give rise to new ideas. In staking out the relationship between thought and language, Herder launched a new and important tradition in the philosophy of language, presaging what would later become known as Linguistic relativity.

Herder did not adhere to the prevailing Enlightenment view that tied meanings with referent objects or ideas, but rather like Wittgenstein he tied meanings to word-usages in practice. In his conjectural narrative of human origins, Herder characterized language as the appropriation of the outer world experienced by the senses within the human mind by means of distinguishing marks (merkmale). In his arguments, Herder reformulated an example from works by Moses Mendelssohn and Thomas Abbt. He argued that, although linguistic morphemes and logographs did not determine thought, the first humans perceived sheep and their bleating, or subjects and corresponding Merkmale, as one and the same. Humans abstract such characteristic marks from sensations to form words. Herder moved beyond his narrative of human origins to contend that if active reflection (besonnenheit) and language persisted in human consciousness, then human impulses to signify were immanent in the pasts, presents, and futures of humanity. Avi Lifschitz subsequently reframed Herder's "the organ of thought" quotation: "Herder's equation of word and idea, of language and cognition, prompted a further attack on any attribution of the first words to the imitation of natural sounds, to the physiology of the vocal organs, or to social convention… [Herder argued] for the linguistic character of our cognition but also for the cognitive nature of human language. One could not think without language, as various Enlightenment thinkers argued, but at the same time one could not properly speak without perceiving the world in a uniquely human way… man would not be himself without language and active reflection, while language deserved its name only as a cognitive aspect of the entire human being." In response to criticism of these contentions, Herder resisted descriptions of his findings as "conjectural" pasts, casting his arguments for a dearth of cognition in humans and "the problem of the origin of language as a synchronic issue rather than a diachronic one."

And in this sense, when Humboldt argues that all thinking is thinking in language, he is perpetuating the Herderian tradition. Herder's focus upon language and cultural traditions as the ties that create a "nation" extended to include folklore, dance, music and art, and inspired Jacob and Wilhelm Grimm in their collection of German folk tales. Arguably, the greatest inheritor of Herder's linguistic philosophy was Wilhelm von Humboldt, whose great contribution lay in developing Herder's idea that language is "the organ of thought" into his own belief that languages were specific worldviews (Weltansichten), as Jürgen Trabant argues in the Wilhelm von Humboldt lectures on the Rouen Ethnolinguistics Project website.

In an important essay on Shakespeare and Auszug aus einem Briefwechsel über Ossian und die Lieder alter Völker (Extract from a correspondence about Ossian and the Songs of Ancient Peoples) published in 1773 in a manifesto along with contributions by Goethe and Justus Möser, Herder wrote that "A poet is the creator of the nation around him, he gives them a world to see and has their souls in his hand to lead them to that world." To him such poetry had its greatest purity and power in nations before they became civilised, as shown in the Old Testament, the Edda, and Homer, and he tried to find such virtues in ancient German folk songs and Norse poetry and mythology. Herder – most pronouncedly after Georg Forster's 1791 translation of the Sanskrit play Shakuntala – was influenced by the religious imagery of Hinduism and Indian literature, which he saw in a positive light, writing several essays on the topic and the preface to the 1803 edition of Shakuntala.

=== Systematic approach to history ===
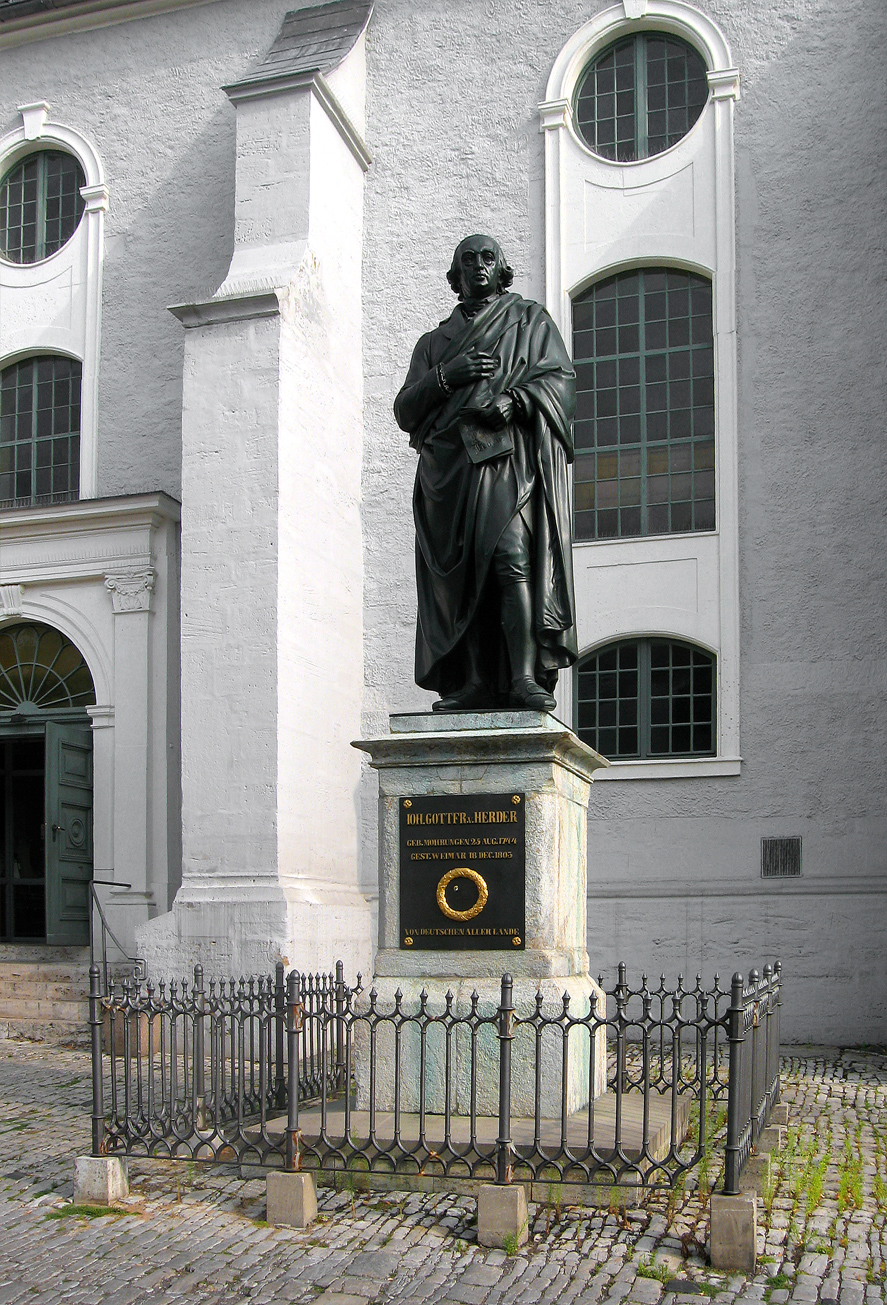
The Johann Gottfried Herder statue in Weimar in front of the church St. Peter und Paul

After he became General Superintendent in 1776, Herder's philosophy shifted again towards classicism, and he began developing his systematic approach to history and human development. This period culminated in his most ambitious work, the four-volume Ideas for a Philosophy of the History of Mankind (Ideen zur Philosophie der Geschichte der Menschheit), published between 1784 and 1791.

The Ideas represented Herder's mature synthesis of his earlier insights about language, culture, and human development into a unified philosophy of history. In this comprehensive treatise, he attempted to trace the development of human culture from its origins through various stages of civilization, combining natural philosophy with cultural theory. The work largely originated the modern school of historical thought and established many foundational concepts in anthropology and cultural studies. Herder's philosophy was deeply subjective, stressing influence by physical and historical circumstance upon human development, and arguing that "one must go into the age, into the region, into the whole history, and feel one's way into everything". The historian should be the "regenerated contemporary" of the past, and history a science as "instrument of the most genuine patriotic spirit".

In what scholars consider the most philosophically significant section of the work, the 15th book, Herder articulated his belief that human progress follows natural laws toward greater reason and justice. He argued that "by the very nature of law, reason and justice must inevitably gain influence among mankind, advancing a more enduring humanity." This optimistic view of historical development placed Herder firmly within the Enlightenment tradition while anticipating later German idealist philosophy.

=== German nationalism and cultural identity ===
Germans did not have a nation-state until the nineteenth century. Those who spoke Germanic languages lived in politically unconnected lands and groups. Herder was among the first German intellectuals to craft a foundation for German cultural unification and German national consciousness based mostly on German language and literature. While rationality was the prime value of Enlightenment philosophers, Herder's appeal to sentiment places him within German Romanticism. He gave Germans new pride in their origins, modifying that dominance of regard allotted to Greek art (Greek Revival) extolled among others by Johann Joachim Winckelmann and Gotthold Ephraim Lessing. He remarked that he would have wished to be born in the Middle Ages and mused whether "the times of the Swabian emperors" did not "deserve to be set forth in their true light in accordance with the German mode of thought?". Herder equated the German with the Gothic and favored Dürer and everything Gothic. As with the sphere of art, he also proclaimed a national message within the sphere of language. He topped the line of German authors emanating from Martin Opitz, who had written his Aristarchus, sive de contemptu linguae Teutonicae in Latin in 1617, urging Germans to glory in their hitherto despised language. Herder's extensive collections of folk-poetry began a great craze in Germany for that neglected topic.

Herder attached exceptional importance to the concept of nationality and of patriotism – "he that has lost his patriotic spirit has lost himself and the whole worlds about himself", whilst teaching that "in a certain sense every human perfection is national". Herder carried folk theory to an extreme by maintaining that "there is only one class in the state, the Volk, (not the rabble), and the king belongs to this class as well as the peasant". Explanation that the Volk was not the rabble was a novel conception in this era, and with Herder can be seen the emergence of "the people" as the basis for the emergence of a classless but hierarchical national body.

The nation, however, was individual and separate, distinguished, to Herder, by climate, education, foreign intercourse, tradition and heredity. Providence he praised for having "wonderfully separated nationalities not only by woods and mountains, seas and deserts, rivers and climates, but more particularly by languages, inclinations and characters". Herder praised the tribal outlook writing that "the savage who loves himself, his wife and child with quiet joy and glows with limited activity of his tribe as for his own life is in my opinion a more real being than that cultivated shadow who is enraptured with the shadow of the whole species", isolated since "each nationality contains its centre of happiness within itself, as a bullet the centre of gravity". With no need for comparison since "every nation bears in itself the standard of its perfection, totally independent of all comparison with that of others" for "do not nationalities differ in everything, in poetry, in appearance, in tastes, in usages, customs and languages? Must not religion which partakes of these also differ among the nationalities?"

Following a trip to Ukraine, Herder wrote a prediction in his diary (Journal meiner Reise im Jahre 1769) that Slavic nations would one day play a significant role in Europe. He praised Ukraine's "beautiful skies, blithe temperament, musical talent, bountiful soil," and expressed hope that "someday will awaken there a cultured nation whose influence will spread throughout the world." Herder also speculated that the Hungarian nation might assimilate into surrounding Slavic cultures, a prediction that sparked considerable debate in Hungary and continues to be referenced.

=== Political philosophy and the Enlightenment ===
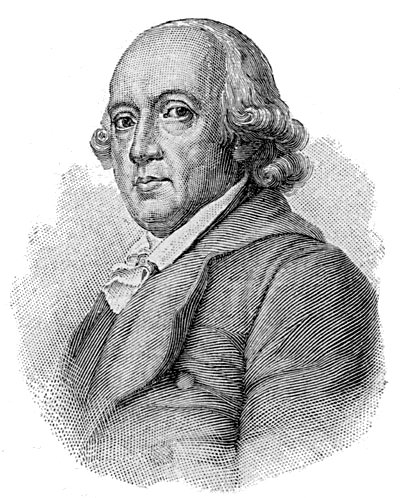
Herder

Herder further developed these ideas by lamenting that Martin Luther did not establish a national church, questioning whether Germany had paid too high a price for adopting Christianity at the expense of its true nationality. His patriotism at times bordered on national pantheism, as he advocated for German territorial unity, stating: "He is deserving of glory and gratitude who seeks to promote the unity of the territories of Germany through writings, manufacture, and institutions." He also warned against the loss of genuine folk traditions:

But now! Again I cry, my German brethren! But now! The remains of all genuine folk-thought is rolling into the abyss of oblivion with a last and accelerated impetus. For the last century we have been ashamed of everything that concerns the fatherland.

In his Ideas for a Philosophy of the History of Mankind, Herder observed: "Compare England with Germany: the English are Germans, and even in the latest times the Germans have led the way for the English in the greatest things."

Herder, who opposed absolutism and Prussian nationalism, embodied the spirit of the German Volk. As a historical theorist, he distanced himself from the rationalist ideas of the eighteenth century, instead seeking a balance between sentiment and reasoning. He believed that knowledge is inherent in the soul, beginning with sensuous and intuitive perception that gradually develops into self-conscious rationality. To Herder, this evolution represented the harmonization of primitive and derivative truth, experience and intelligence, feeling and reasoning.

Herder is the first in a long line of Germans preoccupied with this harmony. This search is itself the key to the understanding of many German theories of the time; however Herder understood and feared the extremes to which his folk-theory could tend, and so issued specific warnings. He argued that Jews in Germany should enjoy the full rights and obligations of Germans, and that the non-Jews of the world owed a debt to Jews for centuries of abuse, and that this debt could be discharged only by actively assisting those Jews who wished to do so to regain political sovereignty in their ancient homeland of Israel. Herder refused to adhere to a rigid racial theory, writing that "notwithstanding the varieties of the human form, there is but one and the same species of man throughout the whole earth".

He also announced that "national glory is a deceiving seducer. When it reaches a certain height, it clasps the head with an iron band. The enclosed sees nothing in the mist but his own picture; he is susceptible to no foreign impressions."

The passage of time was to demonstrate that while many Germans were to find influence in Herder's convictions and influence, fewer were to note his qualifying stipulations.

Herder had emphasised that his conception of the nation encouraged democracy and the free self-expression of a people's identity. He proclaimed support for the French Revolution, a position which did not endear him to royalty. He also differed with Kant's philosophy for not placing reasoning within the context of language. Herder did not think that reason itself could be criticized, as it did not exist except as the process of reasoning. This process was dependent on language. He also turned away from the Sturm und Drang movement to go back to the poems of Shakespeare and Homer.

=== Individual and cultural expression ===
Herder additionally advanced select notions of myriad "authentic" conceptions of Völk and the unity of the individual and natural law, which became fodder for his self-proclaimed twentieth-century disciples. Herderian ideas continue to influence thinkers, linguists and anthropologists, and they have often been considered central to the Sapir–Whorf hypothesis and Franz Boas' coalescence of comparative linguistics and historical particularism with a neo-Kantian/Herderian four-field approach to the study of all cultures, as well as, more recently, anthropological studies by Dell Hymes.

To promote his concept of the Volk, he published letters and collected folk songs. These latter were published in 1773 as Voices of the Peoples in Their Songs (Stimmen der Völker in ihren Liedern). The poets Achim von Arnim and Clemens von Brentano later used Stimmen der Völker as samples for The Boy's Magic Horn (Des Knaben Wunderhorn).

Herder also fostered the ideal of a person's individuality. Although he had from an early period championed the individuality of cultures – for example, in his This Too a Philosophy of History for the Formation of Humanity (1774), he also championed the individuality of persons within a culture; for example, in his On Thomas Abbt's Writings (1768) and On the Cognition and Sensation of the Human Soul (1778).

In On Thomas Abbt's Writings, Herder stated that "a human soul is an individual in the realm of minds: it senses in accordance with an individual formation, and thinks in accordance with the strength of its mental organs. ... My long allegory has succeeded if it achieves the representation of the mind of a human being as an individual phenomenon, as a rarity which deserves to occupy our eyes."

=== Evolution ===
Herder has been described as a proto-evolutionary thinker by some science historians, although this has been disputed by others. Concerning the history of life on earth, Herder proposed naturalistic and metaphysical (religious) ideas that are difficult to distinguish and interpret. He was known for proposing a great chain of being.

In his book From the Greeks to Darwin, Henry Fairfield Osborn wrote that "in a general way he upholds the doctrine of the transformation of the lower and higher forms of life, of a continuous transformation from lower to higher types, and of the law of Perfectibility." However, biographer Wulf Köpke disagreed, noting that "biological evolution from animals to the human species was outside of his thinking, which was still influenced by the idea of divine creation."

== Bibliography ==
- Song to Cyrus, the Grandson of Astyages (1762)
- Essay on Being (1763–64)
- On Diligence in Several Learned Languages (1764)
- Treatise on the Ode (1764)
- How Philosophy can become more Universal and Useful for the Benefit of the People (1765)
- Fragments on Recent German Literature (1767–68)
- On Thomas Abbt's Writings (1768)
- Critical Forests, or Reflections on the Science and Art of the Beautiful (1769–)
- Gott – einige Gespräche über Spinoza's System nebst Shaftesbury's Naturhymnus (Gotha: Karl Wilhelm Ettinger, 1787)
- Journal of my Voyage in the Year 1769 (first published 1846)
- Treatise on the Origin of Language (1772)
- Selection from correspondence on Ossian and the songs of ancient peoples (1773) See also: James Macpherson (1736–1796).
- Of German Character and Art (with Goethe, manifesto of the Sturm und Drang) (1773)
- This Too a Philosophy of History for the Formation of Humanity (1774)
- Oldest Document of the Human Race (1774–76)
- "Essay on Ulrich von Hutten" ["Nachricht von Ulrich von Hutten"] (1776)
- On the Resemblance of Medieval English and German Poetry (1777)
- Sculpture: Some Observations on Shape and Form from Pygmalion's Creative Dream (1778)
- On the Cognition and Sensation of the Human Soul (1778)
- On the Effect of Poetic Art on the Ethics of Peoples in Ancient and Modern Times (1778)
- Folk Songs (1778–79; second ed. of 1807 titled The Voices of Peoples in Songs)
- On the Influence of the Government on the Sciences and the Sciences on the Government (Dissertation on the Reciprocal Influence of Government and the Sciences) (1780)
- Letters Concerning the Study of Theology (1780–81)
- On the Influence of the Beautiful in the Higher Sciences (1781)
- On the Spirit of Hebrew Poetry. An Instruction for Lovers of the Same and the Oldest History of the Human Spirit (1782–83)
- God. Some Conversations (1787)
- Oriental Dialogues 1787
- Ideas on the Philosophy of the History of Mankind (1784–91)
- Scattered Leaves (1785–97)
- Letters for the Advancement of Humanity (1791–97 or 1793–97? (various drafts))
- Thoughts on Some Brahmins (1792)
- Zerstreute Blätter (1792)
- Christian Writings (5 vols.) (1794–98)
- Terpsichore (1795–96) A translation and commentary of the Latin poet Jakob Balde.
- On the Son of God and Saviour of the World, according to the Gospel of John (1797)
- Persepolisian Letters (1798). Fragments on Persian architecture, history and religion.
- Luther's Catechism, with a catechetical instruction for the use of schools (1798)
- Understanding and Experience. A Metacritique of the Critique of Pure Reason. Part I. (Part II, Reason and Language.) (1799)
- Calligone (1800)
- Adrastea: Events and Characters of the 18th Century (6 vols.) (1801–03)
- The Cid (1805; a free translation of the Spanish epic Cantar de Mio Cid)

=== Works in English ===
- Herder's Essay on Being. A Translation and Critical Approaches. Edited and translated by John K. Noyes (Rochester: Camden House, 2018). Herder's early essay on metaphysics, translated with a series of critical commentaries.
- Song Loves the Masses: Herder on Music and Nationalism. Edited and translated by Philip Vilas Bohlman (Berkeley: University of California Press, 2017). Collected writings on music, from Volkslieder to sacred song.
- J. G. Herder on Social & Political Culture (Cambridge Studies in the History and Theory of Politics), ed. F. M. Barnard (Cambridge University Press, 2010; original pub. 1969), ISBN 978-0-521-13381-4. Selected texts: 1. Journal of my voyage in the year 1769; 2. Essay on the origin of language; 3. Yet another philosophy of history; 4. Dissertation on the reciprocal influence of government and the sciences; 5. Ideas for a philosophy of the history of mankind.
- Selected Writings on Aesthetics. Edited and translated by Gregory Moore (Princeton University Press, 2006). ISBN 978-0691115955. Makes many of Herder's writings on aesthetics available in English for the first time.
- Herder: Philosophical Writings, eds. Desmond M. Clarke and Michael N. Forster (Cambridge University Press, 2004), ISBN 978-0-521-79088-8. The most important of Herder's philosophical works in English, including an unabridged version of the Treatise on the Origin of Language and This Too [...]. Complete contents: Part I—General Philosophical Program: 1. How philosophy can become more universal and useful for the benefit of the people (1765); Part II—Philosophy of Language: 2. Fragments on recent German literature (1767–68); 3. Treatise on the origin of language (1772); Part III—Philosophy of Mind: 4. On Thomas Abbt's writings (1768); 5. On cognition and sensation, the two main forces of the human soul [preface] (1775); 6. On the cognition and sensation of the human soul (1778); Part IV—Philosophy of History: 7. On the change of taste (1766); 8. Older critical Forestlet (1767/8); 9. This too a philosophy of history for the formation of humanity (1774); Part V—Political Philosophy: 10. Letters concerning the progress of humanity (1792); 11. Letters for the advancement of humanity (1793–97).
- Another Philosophy of History and Selected Political Writings, eds. Ioannis D. Evrigenis and Daniel Pellerin (Indianapolis: Hackett Publishing, 2004). A translation of Auch eine Philosophie and other works.
- Herder on Nationality, Humanity, and History, F. M. Barnard (Montreal and Kingston: McGill-Queen's University Press, 2003), ISBN 978-0-7735-2519-1.
- Sculpture: Some Observations on Shape and Form from Pygmalion's Creative Dream, ed. Jason Gaiger (Chicago: University of Chicago Press, 2002). Translation of Herder's Plastik.
- On World History, eds. Hans Adler and Ernest A. Menze (Armonk, N.Y.: M. E. Sharpe, 1997). Short excerpts on history from various texts.
- Selected Early Works, eds. Ernest A. Menze and Karl Menges (University Park: Pennsylvania State University Press, 1992). Partial translation of the important text Über die neuere deutsche Litteratur.
- Herder's Social and Political Thought: From Enlightenment to Nationalism, F. M. Barnard (Oxford: Clarendon Press, 1967).

== See also ==
- Herder Prize
- Wilhelm Martin Leberecht de Wette
