= Shirley F. Marks =

American psychiatrist

Shirley F. Marks (born 1946) is an American psychiatrist. She was the second African-American woman to graduate from Harvard Medical School.

== Early life and education ==
Marks was born and raised in Tyler, Texas, attending public schools through high school. She attended Spelman College and earned a bachelor's degree in biology and went on to Harvard Medical School, where she earned her doctorate in 1973. She graduated from psychiatry residency and earned a Master's of Public Health degree in 1976 from the Harvard School of Public Health. While at Spelman, Marks earned a scholarship to study abroad in Vienna, at the same time as Maxine Hayes, and both returned to complete their studies at Spelman and to study medicine at Harvard.

== Career ==
Beginning in residency, Marks researched community psychiatry and psychiatric epidemiology. Her professional career began in 1976, when she became a professor at Baylor College of Medicine and directed the local Veterans Affairs outpatient addiction program. In the 1990s, she began to work with incarcerated women and with women who have experienced significant trauma. She has raised awareness of depression, suicide (especially of young black men), and violence against women as public health concerns. She has also advocated for greater cultural awareness among psychiatric providers.

== Honors and awards ==
- Charles Merrill Jr. Scholarship, Vienna 1967-68
- Service Award, National Medical Association Council on Concerns of Women Physicians (2000)
- President, Black Psychiatrists of America
- Director, Texas Foundation for Psychiatric Education and Research
