= Hyperallergic =

Online arts magazine

- Website type: Blogazine, art, culture
- Owners: Hrag Vartanian; Veken Gueyikian
- Editor: Hrag Vartanian
- Website: hyperallergic.com
- Launched: October 2009
- Current status: Active

Hyperallergic is an online arts magazine, based in Brooklyn, New York. Founded by the art critic Hrag Vartanian and his husband Veken Gueyikian, who serves as publisher, in October 2009, the site describes itself as a "forum for serious, playful, and radical thinking".

== Reception ==
Hyperallergic LABS, its Tumblr blog, was named by Time magazine as one of the "30 Tumblrs to Follow in 2013". The New Yorker critic Peter Schjeldahl described the site as "infectiously ill-tempered". Holland Cotter of the New York Times suggested it could contribute to a needed "influx of new commentators who don’t mistake attitude for ideas". The publication was cited by the TED blog as one of "100 Websites You Should Know and Use" in 2007 [2013 update to the 2007 list]. In 2018, Nieman Reports published an article outlining how Hyperallergic came to rival print art journalism, in which Sarah Douglas, the ARTnews editor in chief, said that Hyperallergic had reinvigorated art criticism.

== Overview ==
The current editor is Hakim Bishara. Editors include Albert Mobilio and John Yau.
