= Hrag Vartanian =

Armenian-American arts curator

- Հրակ Վարդանեան
- Born: 1973 or 1974 (age 52–53); Aleppo, Syria
- Occupation: Art critic
- Organization: Hyperallergic

Hrag Vartanian (Armenian: Հրակ Վարդանեան; born 1973 or 1974) is an Armenian-American arts writer, art critic, and art curator. He is the editor-in-chief and co-founder of the arts online magazine Hyperallergic.

== Life and work ==
Vartanian was born in Aleppo, Syria, raised in Toronto, Ontario, Canada, and lives in Brooklyn, New York. His blog-magazine Hyperallergic was founded by Vartanian and his husband Veken Gueyikian in October 2009 as a "forum for serious, playful and radical thinking". Vartanian has contributed to numerous online and print publications including the Art:21 blog, Boldtype, The Brooklyn Rail, Huffington Post, AGBU News Magazine, Ararat Magazine, and NYFA Current. He has guest contributed to Al Jazeera, NPR, ABC, and WNYC. He was formerly Director of Communications at AGBU, the world's largest Armenian non-profit organization. Vartanian was a staunch supporter of the controversial Hide/Seek exhibit which was censored by the Smithsonian.

== Curation ==
Vartanian has curated numerous exhibitions since the late 1990s. His most recent curatorial project was "Fixed Point Perspective: Ottoman Studio Photography and its Contemporary Legacy" at Minerva Projects in Denver, Colorado. The work in the show was a mix of contemporary and historical, and featured artists.

== Writings ==
- "Do Bush's Paintings Tell Us Anything About the Former President?" (February 2013)
- "An Experiment in Street Art Criticism" (March 2010)
- "Is Contemporary Architecture a PR Panacea for Autocrats? Western Architectural Ethics & Undemocratic Nations" in Brooklyn Rail (September 2008)
- "The Very Public Life of Street Art" in Brooklyn Rail (May 2008)
- "Peter Sourian" from "Forgotten Bread: First Generation Armenian-American Writers" edited by David Kherdian (Berkeley, CA: Heyday books, 2007)
- "An Imaginary Armenian Canadian Homeland: Gariné Torossian's Dialogue with Egoyan" from Image and Territory: Essays on Atom Egoyan edited by Monique Tschofen and Jennifer Burwell (Waterloo, ON: Wildred Laurier University Press, 2006).
- Bushwick Open Studios featuring artists: Andrew Ohanesian, Tescia Seufferlein, Andrew Cornell Robinson, Richard Martinez.
- "Schwierige Wahrheiten: Die Schriftstellerin Nancy Kricorian (The Will to Resist: A Portrait of Nancy Kricorian)," in Porträt einer Hoffnung Die Armenier edited by Huberta von Voss (Verlag Hans Schiller, 2004). English edition
- "New York Life Recognizes Genocide Era Insurance Claims," AGBU Magazine (April 2004).
- "Nazi Style Wars," The Brooklyn Rail (October 2003).
- "Curating on the Margins," The Brooklyn Rail (Winter 2003).
- "Artist Biographies," The Clement Greenberg Collection (Princeton, NJ: Princeton University, 2001).
- FutureHype/Kitabet, edited by Carmen Donabedian & Hrag Vartanian (Beirut: Haigazian University, 1998).
- "Chine Drive: An Arts & Crafts Community," in The Stuff Dreams are Made of: The Art and Design of Frederick and Louise Coates (Toronto: University of Toronto, 1997).
