= Narrative Magazine =

American online literary magazine

Narrative
- Cover of Narrative Magazine, Fall 2003.
- OL: Carol Edgarian and Tom Jenks
- Categories: Literary magazine, electronic literature, fiction, poetry, arts, culture, internet
- Frequency: Weekly
- Founder: Carol Edgarian and Tom Jenks
- First issue: Fall 2003
- Company: Narrative Magazine Inc.
- Country: United States
- Based in: San Francisco
- Language: English
- Website: OL168
- OCLC: 200023

Narrative Magazine is a non-profit digital publisher of fiction, poetry, non-fiction, and art founded in 2003 by Tom Jenks and Carol Edgarian. Narrative publishes weekly and provides educational resources to teachers and students; subscription and access to its content is free.

== Overview ==
Narrative was cofounded in 2003 by the former editor of Esquire, Gentlemen's Quarterly, and Scribner, Tom Jenks, and New York Times-bestselling author Carol Edgarian.

Narrative is headquartered in San Francisco. It publishes fiction, creative non-fiction, poetry, and art of different forms from established and emerging writers . Additionally, Narrative coined the iStory—a short, dramatic narrative, fiction or nonfiction, up to 150 words long—and the iPoem—a short poem that fits within no more than two screens on the iPhone (up to 150 words long). It also publishes features on craft, teaching, and other topics related to professional writing. All works of contemporary writing accepted by the magazine are previously unpublished. All Narrative writers are paid for their contributions, but Narrative charges a submission fee.

Narrative's team of editors include co-founders Tom Jenks and Carol Edgarian, Michael Wiegers of Copper Canyon Press, among others.

== Prizes and writers ==
Narrative awards various prizes to writers throughout the year. Its namesake recognition, the Narrative Prize, is a single $5,000 prize awarded annually to a new or emerging writer published in Narrative. Narrative Prize winners include:

- Ola Szczecinska (2026)
- A.T. Steel (2025)
- Madeleine Cravens (2024)
- Neha Chaudhary-Kamdar (2023)
- Sarah Balakrishnan (2022)
- Morgan Talty (2021)
- Tryphena L Yeboah (2021)
- Gbenga Adesina (2020)
- Brenden Willey (2019)
- Paisley Rekdal (2018)
- Javier Zamora (2017)
- Sara Houghteling (2016)
- Ocean Vuong (2015)
- Austin Smith (2014)
- Kirstin Valdez Quade (2013)
- Nathan Poole (2012)
- Natalie Diaz (2012)
- Kevin A. González (2011)
- Anthony Marra (2010)
- Maud Newton (2009)
- Alexi Zentner (2008)
- Michael Dickman (2008)
- Alma García (2007)
- Saidiya Hartman (2007)
- Mermer Blakeslee (2006)
- Ned Parker (2006)
- Pia Z Ehrhardt (2005)
- Min Jin Lee (2004)

Other Narrative awards include the Narrative Spring, Fall, and Winter Fiction and Nonfiction Contests, the Annual Narrative Poetry Contest, and more. Each contest awards monetary prizes.

Other Narrative writers include Chris Abani, Ann Beattie, Sharon Olds, Jennifer Egan, Tobias Wolff, Jericho Brown, and more. Narrative writers have earned the Nobel Prize, Pulitzer Prize, National Book Award, Whiting Awards, the Pushcart Prize, and the Atlantic prize, and have appeared in collections such as The Best American Short Stories, The Best American Nonrequired Reading, and others.

== Narrative for Schools ==
Narrative for Schools is a program that was founded in 2014 by Narrative co-founder Carol Edgarian to provide teachers and students with free literary educational tools and content. Narrative for Schools offers writing video tutorials, reading lists, and the Narrative High School Writing Contest.

The annual winners of the Annual Narrative High School Writing Contest are awarded monetary prizes, mentorship, and publication in Narrative. Originally an essay contest, the competition has expanded to include fiction, nonfiction, and poetry. The contest receives submissions from fifty-five countries across the world.

== Narrative Library ==
The Narrative library includes over 2,000 authors and thousands of works of fiction, poetry, non-fiction, and art available for free. It is searchable by themes categorized under the headings "Living," "Social Commentary," "Relationships," "The Environment," "The Spiritual," "Travel," "The Writing Life," and "Holidays."

Narrative was the first literary magazine available on Kindle.

== See also ==
- List of literary magazines
