= Mermer Blakeslee =

American novelist

Mermer Blakeslee was born, raised, and still lives in the Catskill Mountains of New York. She has written two novels, Same Blood (Houghton Mifflin, 1989) and In Dark Water (Ballantine, 1998); the latter was selected by Barnes & Noble for its Discover Great New Writers series. She is also the author of the nonfiction work In the Yikes! Zone: A Conversation with Fear (Dutton, 2002). Blakeslee received three New York Foundation for the Arts Fellowships in fiction and the 2006 Narrative Prize from Narrative Magazine for her story “Leenie.”
