= Three Stages of Amazement =

2011 novel by Carol Edgarian

- First edition
- Author: Carol Edgarian
- Language: English
- Genre: Novel
- Publisher: Scribner
- Publication date: 2011
- Publication place: United States
- Media type: Print (hardback)
- Pages: 304 pp
- ISBN: 978-1-4391-9830-8

Three Stages of Amazement is a novel by Carol Edgarian. The novel reached the New York Times bestseller list in its first week of publication, O Magazine chose it as a Top Pick, and Indiebound selected it as a Pick of the Month.

== Critical reception ==
Three Stages of Amazement was called “furiously compelling” by Janet Maslin at the New York Times, “superbly crafted, skillfully plotted” by The Washington Post, and “generous and graceful and true” by O Magazine. The Daily Beast wrote: "both an epic love story and a reflection of social anthropology in America today, Three Stages of Amazement is a gracefully rendered narrative of the inevitable joys and heartaches we face in adulthood."
