= Pia Z. Ehrhardt =

American writer

Pia Z. Ehrhardt is an American writer whose story collection Famous Fathers (ISBN 1596922354) was published by MacAdam/Cage in 2007. Ehrhardt has also been published in Narrative Magazine, McSweeney's and The Mississippi Review. She acted as Guest Editor for Guernica Magazine in September, 2009. She is the winner of the 2005 Narrative Prize.
