= Jennifer Manlove =

American sociological researcher

- Education: Ph.D., Sociology. MS Sociology. BS Economics.
- Alma mater: Duke University, Grinnell College
- Scientific career
- Fields: Adolescent relationship formation and sexual, reproductive and parenting behavior
- Institutions: Child Trends

Jennifer Manlove is an American sociological research scientist. She is a senior research scientist and co-director of the Reproductive Health and Family Formation program for the research institute Child Trends.

== Education ==
Manlove received a bachelor's degree in economics from Grinnell College and a master's in sociology from Duke University. In 1993 she received a PhD in sociology from Duke University. From 1993 to 1995 she held a post-doctoral research fellowship at the National Center for Education Statistics funded by the American Educational Research Association.

== Career ==
Manlove is a senior research scientist and formerly director of the Reproductive Health and Family Formation program for the research institute Child Trends; as of 2021 she was co-director. She began working at Child Trends in 1995 as a research associate.

Manlove's research interests include sexual and reproductive decision-making, fertility, and pregnancy among teenagers and young adults. She has been principal investigator for research grants from government agencies such as the National Institutes of Health to investigate the formation of relationships, effectiveness of pregnancy prevention programs, patterns of contraceptive use, effects of unintended pregnancy, and adjustment to fatherhood among young adults and teenagers. She has worked in association with Brookings Institution.

== Selected publications ==
- Manlove, Jennifer (1997). "Early Motherhood in an Intergenerational Perspective: The Experiences of a British Cohort". Journal of Marriage and the Family. 59 (2): 263–279. doi:10.2307/353469. ISSN 0022-2445. JSTOR 353469.
- Manlove, Jennifer (1998). "The Influence of High School Dropout and School Disengagement on the Risk of School-Age Pregnancy". Journal of Research on Adolescence. 8 (2): 187–220. doi:10.1207/s15327795jra0802_2. ISSN 1050-8392. PMID 12294323.
- Manlove, Jennifer; Ryan, Suzanne; Franzetta, Kerry (2003). "Patterns of Contraceptive Use Within Teenagers' First Sexual Relationships". Perspectives on Sexual and Reproductive Health. 35 (6): 246–255. doi:10.1111/j.1931-2393.2003.tb00177.x. ISSN 1931-2393. PMC 1473988. PMID 14744656.
- Manlove, Jennifer; Logan, Cassandra; Moore, Kristin A.; Ikramullah, Erum (June 2008). "Pathways from Family Religiosity to Adolescent Sexual Activity and Contraceptive Use". Perspectives on Sexual and Reproductive Health. 40 (2): 105–117. doi:10.1363/4010508. ISSN 1538-6341. PMC 6532059. PMID 18577143.
