= Albert Shaw (journalist) =

American journalist (1857–1947)

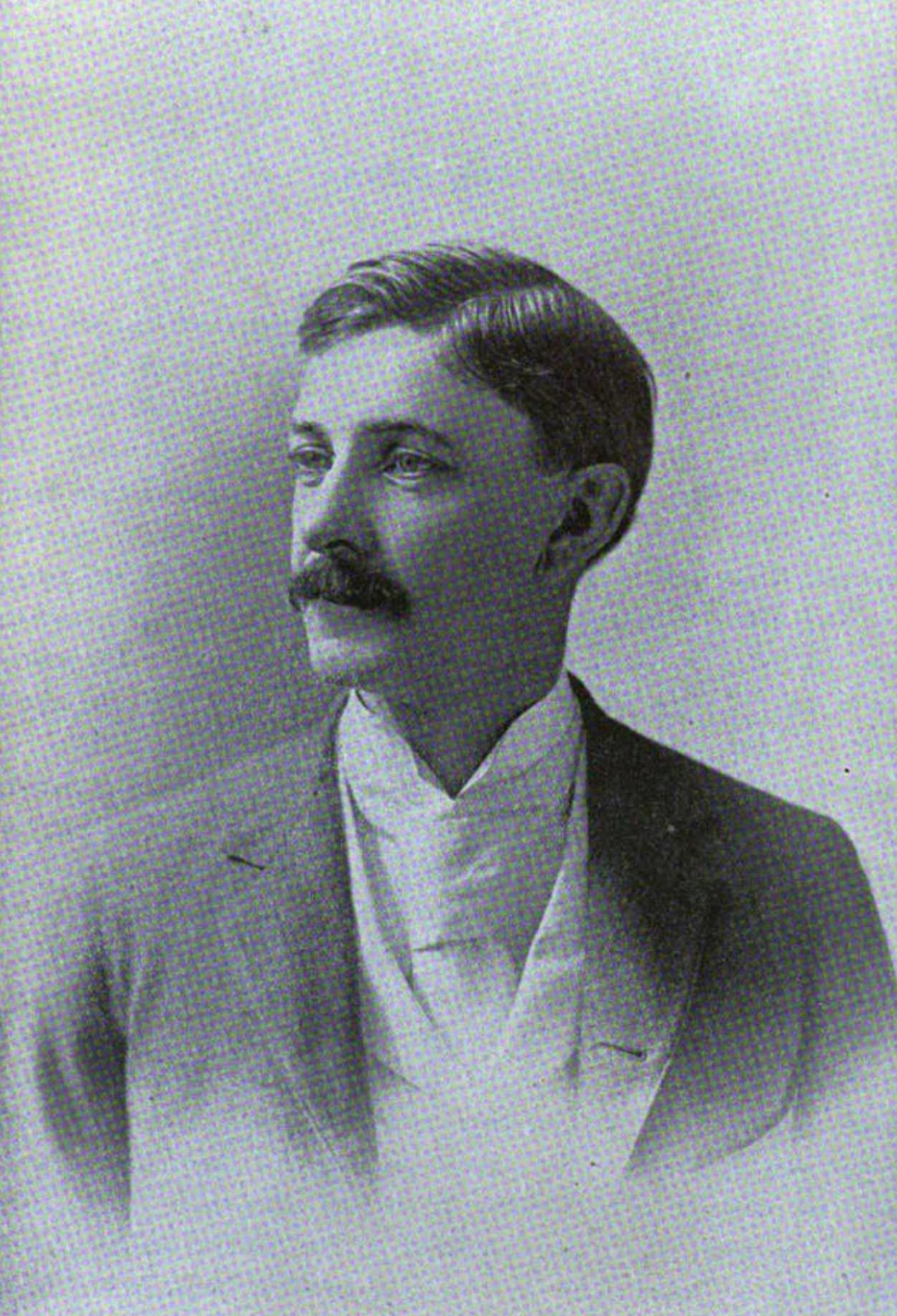
- Shaw c. 1896
- Born: July 23, 1857; Shandon, Ohio, United States
- Died: June 25, 1947 (aged 89)
- Education: Johns Hopkins University
- Known for: The American Review of Reviews
- Scientific career
- Doctoral advisor: Richard T. Ely

Albert Shaw (July 23, 1857 – June 25, 1947) was an American journalist and academic.

== Life ==
Born in Shandon, Ohio, to the family of Dr. Griffin M. Shaw, Albert Shaw moved to Iowa in the spring of 1875, where he attended Iowa College (now Grinnell College) specializing in constitutional history and economic science and graduated in 1879. While a student, Shaw also worked as a journalist at the Grinnell Herald. In 1881 he entered Johns Hopkins University as a graduate student.

In 1883, Shaw secured a position on the Minneapolis Tribune but returned to Johns Hopkins to complete a Ph.D. His thesis, "Icaria: A Chapter in the History of Communism", was later translated and published in Germany. After graduation, he resumed work at the Tribune.

In 1888, Shaw took a sociological tour of Britain and the European continent. There he met British journalist and reformer William Thomas Stead, editor of the British journal Review of Reviews.

In the autumn of 1890 Shaw was elected professor of international law and political institutions at Cornell University but resigned the post in 1891 to accept Stead's invitation to establish The American Review of Reviews as an American edition of the Review of Reviews. Shaw served as editor-in-chief of this publication until it ceased publication in 1937, ten years before his death at the age of ninety.

Shaw married Elizabeth Leonard Bacon of Reading, Pennsylvania, on September 5, 1893.

Shaw was elected a member of the American Antiquarian Society in October 1893. He was a leader of the Southern Education Board.

== Selected works ==
- Municipal Government in Great Britain. New York: The Century Company. 1895.
- Municipal Government in Continental Europe. New York: The MacMillan Company. 1903.
- Business Career in its Public Relations. San Francisco: Paul Elder and Company. 1904.
- Political Problems of American Development: The Columbia University Lectures. New York: Columbia University Press. 1907. ISBN 9780231923620.
- A Cartoon History of Roosevelt's Career. New York: The Review of Reviews Corporation. 1910. ISBN 9780598589354.
- Abraham Lincoln: His Path to the Presidency. New York: The Review of Reviews Corporation. 1929.
- Abraham Lincoln: The Year of His Election, 3rd Ed. New York: The Review of Reviews Corporation. 1929.

== See also ==
- Albert Shaw Lectures on Diplomatic History
