= Deborah Temkin =

- Born: 1985 (age 40–41); Tucson, Arizona
- Education: Vassar College
- Alma mater: The Pennsylvania State University
- Known for: Bullying prevention, school climate, and connecting education policy to healthy youth development
- Scientific career
- Fields: Child development, prevention research
- Workplaces: U.S. Department of Education

Deborah A. Temkin (aka Deborah Temkin Cahill; born 1985) is an American child development and prevention research scientist, specializing in bullying prevention, school climate, and connecting education policy to healthy youth development. She was the Research and Policy Coordinator for Bullying Prevention Initiatives at the U.S. Department of Education from 2010 to 2012, where she was charged with coordinating the Obama administration's bullying prevention efforts, including launching StopBullying.gov. She was a finalist for the 2012 "Call to Service Medal" for the Samuel J. Heyman Service to America Medals for her work at the Department. Temkin is currently the vice president for youth development and education research at Child Trends.

== Early life and education ==
Temkin grew up in Tucson, Arizona, where she was reportedly a victim of bullying while she was in middle school. Temkin describes the bullying she faced as having started over a feud over her middle school newspaper, which quickly escalated into relational, verbal, and physical bullying including social exclusion by a majority of her school-mates. In newspaper and radio interviews, Temkin reported that her personal experiences with bullying, and particularly her school's lack of response inspired her to understand bullying and what could be done to prevent it. Temkin graduated from Vassar College in 2007, where she majored in Psychology and Education Policy, and then went to The Pennsylvania State University where she received an M.A. in Education Theory and Policy and both her M.S. and Ph.D. in Human Development and Family Studies. Temkin was a Prevention and Methodology Pre-Doctoral Fellow through the Pennsylvania State University's Prevention and Methodology Centers, and her research focused on bullying, adolescent friendship networks, and education policy.

== U.S. Department of Education and StopBullying.gov ==
In November 2009, Temkin attended the International Bullying Prevention Association Conference in Pittsburgh, Pennsylvania, where Kevin Jennings, then Assistant Deputy Secretary for the Office of Safe and Drug-Free Schools, was the keynote speaker. Temkin reportedly went up to Jennings following his speech and asked to work for him. Jennings offered Temkin an unpaid internship, which she began in January, 2010. During the Summer of 2010, Jennings charged Temkin with planning the first annual Federal Partners in Bullying Prevention Summit. After the successful event, Temkin was hired on into the first federal position dedicated to bullying prevention.

As attention to bullying grew in the fall of 2010, after a string of bullying related suicides, Jennings and Temkin began working closely with the White House to plan the first ever White House Conference on Bullying Prevention and to design and launch the government's central repository on bullying prevention, StopBullying.gov. Temkin also began work on several other initiatives, including closely managing the Federal Partners in Bullying Prevention, a coalition of 9 Federal departments, and launching research projects with the CDC and internally at the Department of Education to understand the definition of bullying and to understand the scope and impact of anti-bullying laws.

After Jennings left the Department of Education in July, 2011, Temkin continued to lead the bullying prevention initiatives, organizing the second and third annual Federal Partners in Bullying Prevention Summits in 2011 and 2012 and overseeing the relaunch of StopBullying.gov in April, 2012. During this time she also helped coordinate a partnership between the Department of Education and the Ad Council to launch a public service campaign targeted towards parents on the need to become "more than a bystander.". She also worked to support the release of a teacher training module on bullying. Temkin was also a featured speaker at several events, including the White House Conference on LGBT Families and a Townhall for Senator Frank Lautenberg as well as a trusted media source, quoted in several articles in major publications and appearing on radio and television programming.

In March, 2012 Temkin was named a finalist for the "Call to Service" medal of the Samuel J. Heyman Service to America Medals, recognizing the outstanding federal service of those under 35 years old.

== Current position ==
Following her departure from the Department of Education, Temkin worked from 2012 to 2014 at the Robert F. Kennedy Center for Justice and Human Rights where she launched a new bullying prevention initiative, Project SEATBELT (Safe Environments Achieved Through Bullying prevention, Engagement, Leadership, & Teaching respect). Temkin is now the vice president for youth development and education research at Child Trends.
