= Maud Newton =

American writer, critic (b. 1971)

- Born: May 21, 1971 (age 55); Dallas, Texas, U.S.
- Education: University of Florida
- Occupations: Writer and critic
- Website: maudnewton.com/blog/

Rebecca "Maud" Newton is a writer, critic, and former lawyer born in Dallas, Texas in 1971. She was raised in Miami, Florida.

== Writing ==
Newton first came to attention as the founder of an early litblog. Her essays, critiques and short stories have appeared in a number of publications, including The New York Times Magazine, Esquire, The Wall Street Journal, Time, Harper's Magazine, The New York Times Book Review, Harper's Bazaar, Catapult, Bookforum, Narrative Magazine, The Awl, Tin House, and Humanities.

Her first book, the non-fiction Ancestor Trouble: A Reckoning and a Reconciliation, was published by Random House in 2022. The book was named one of the best of 2022 by The New Yorker, NPR, The Washington Post, The Boston Globe, Time, Esquire, Garden & Gun, Entertainment Weekly, and The Atlanta Journal-Constitution.

== Personal life ==
Newton was born in Dallas and raised in a fundamentalist household in Miami by an evangelical mother and racist father. She attended college as an English major and law school at the University of Florida. She lives in New York City.

== Awards and honors ==
In 2004, she received the Irwin and Alice Stark Short Fiction Award from the City College of New York and in June 2008, she won second prize in the Narrative Magazine Love Story Contest. She was awarded the 2009 Narrative Prize Fiction, for her short story "When the Flock Changed."

Her book Ancestor Trouble was a finalist for the 2023 John Leonard Prize, awarded by the National Book Critics Circle for a first book in any genre.

== Writings ==
- Ancestor Trouble: A Reckoning and a Reconciliation Random House (2022)
