= Child Trends =

US research institute

- Type: Research center
- Location: Bethesda, Maryland
- Services: Research
- President: Carol Emig
- Revenue: 23,000,000 (2019)
- Staff: 177
- Website: https://www.childtrends.org

Child Trends is a nonprofit, nonpartisan, research center based in Bethesda, Maryland, which conducts research on children, children's families, child well-being, and factors affecting children's lives.

== History ==
Child Trends was founded in 1979 and in 2014 added the Child Trends Hispanic Institute, now the National Research Center on Hispanic Children & Families, with partnership from Duke University, University of North Carolina, and University of Maryland. The organization developed a tool for estimating agencies' kinship diversion practices.

In 2019, Fortune named the organization as #5 on its list of 25 Best Small and Medium Workplaces for Women.

== Funding ==
The organization is funded through grants and contracts from foundations, federal and state agencies, and other organizations. In 2019, they had revenues of $23 million.

== Research ==
Child Trends studies children and teens at all stages of sexual development and provides research, data, and analysis to advocacy groups, government agencies, and other institutions including program providers, the policy community, researchers and educators, and the media. Research focus includes:

- Child health
- Child poverty
- Child welfare
- Children of immigrants
- Early Childhood Development
- Education
- Foster care
- Child well-being
- Marriage & Family
- Fatherhood and parenting
- Early childhood education
- Teenage pregnancy
- Teen sex
- Youth development

== Other projects ==
Child Trends designs and conducts evaluations of child development and well-being. The Child Trends DataBank is an online resource for national trends and research on key indicators of child and youth well-being. Child Trends' What Works is a collection of experimental evaluations of social interventions that assess child outcomes.

== Notable staff and board ==
- Maura Corrigan
- Robert Doar
- Jennifer Manlove
- Mavis Sanders
- Deborah Temkin
