= Greg Thielmann =

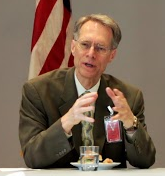
Greg Thielmann

A. Gregory Thielmann is a former mid-level official in the U.S. State Department's Bureau of Intelligence and Research who, after retiring in September 2002, publicly disputed the rationale for the U.S. invasion of Iraq offered by the George W. Bush administration. He is currently a board member of the Arms Control Association and member of the Council on Foreign Relations. His areas of expertise and research include threat assessments, nuclear/missile proliferation, and US-Russian strategic arms control.

== Career ==
A native of Newton, Iowa, Alan Gregory Thielmann is a graduate of Grinnell College and the Woodrow Wilson School of Public and International Affairs at Princeton University (1975). Thielmann worked as a budget examiner in the National Security Division of the Office of Management and Budget before entering the United States Foreign Service, where he served for more than 25 years, working in arms control and security issues. He was acting director of the Strategic, Proliferation, and Military Affairs Office in the Bureau of Intelligence and Research at the State Department at the time of his retirement.

After retiring from the State Department, Thielmann worked for four years for the Senate Select Committee on Intelligence before joining the Arms Control Association.

Based on his professional familiarity with the relevant intelligence regarding Iraqi weapons of mass destruction, Thielmann criticized the stated rationale for the Iraq War of the George W. Bush Administration, during the lead-up to the invasion and afterward, arguing that the administration used “faith-based” rather than fact-based intelligence:

"There's plenty of blame to go around. The main problem was that the senior administration officials have what I call faith-based intelligence. They knew what they wanted the intelligence to show. They were really blind and deaf to any kind of countervailing information the intelligence community would produce. I would assign some blame to the intelligence community and most of the blame to the senior administration officials."

His 2003 appearance on a CBS News 60 Minutes II segment, titled “The Man Who Knew,” won an Emmy Award for interviewer Scott Pelley. Thielmann received the 2003 “Citizen Watchdog” award from the Center for Investigative Reporting.
