= The Review of Reviews =

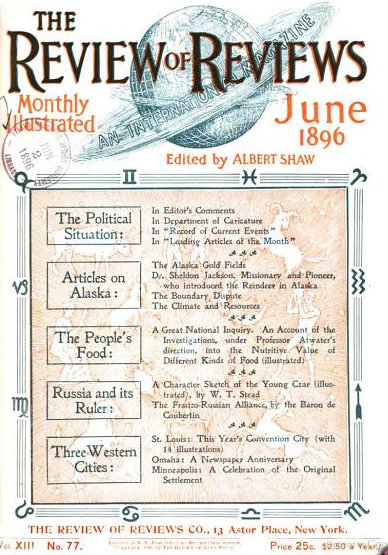
Front cover of Vol. XIII, No. 77 of The Review of Reviews (New York), June 1896

The Review of Reviews was a noted family of monthly journals founded in 1890–1893 by British reform journalist William Thomas Stead (1849–1912). Established across three continents in London (1891), New York (1892) and Melbourne (1893), The Review of Reviews, The American Review of Reviews and The Australasian Review of Reviews represented Stead's dream of a global publishing empire.

== Founder, W. T. Stead ==
Stead was a career journalist who was drawn into reform politics in the 1880s, crusading through for such causes as British-Russian friendship, the reform of England's criminal codes, and the maintenance of international peace. He was most famous in Britain for having passed, almost single-handedly, the first child-protection law by investigating and reporting child vice and white slavery in a series of articles titled the "Maiden Tribute of Modern Babylon", published in the Pall Mall Gazette in July 1885.

As a result, the Criminal Law Amendment Act 1885 raised the consent age for girls from thirteen to sixteen, similar to "statutory rape" laws in the United States. As editor of the London Pall Mall Gazette (1883–1889), Stead caused newspapers to appear the way they are today. He introduced cross-heads (section titles) and signed articles, popularized interviews, and started illustrations and indexing. An advanced feminist, he was the first London editor to pay women equally with men.

He authored many books, including The Truth about Russia (1888), If Christ Came to Chicago (1893), and The Americanization of the World (1902). His essay "How the Mail Steamer Went Down in Mid Atlantic" (1886) is considered his first prediction of the sinking of the RMS Titanic; his novel From the Old World to the New (1892) was the second prediction. Stead himself died in the sinking of the Titanic in 1912.

== The Review of Reviews ==
The Review of Reviews
- Frequency: Monthly
- Founder: W. T. Stead and Sir George Newnes
- First issue: January 1890; 136 years ago
- Final issue: 1936
- Country: United Kingdom
- Based in: London
- Language: English

The Review of Reviews was started in January 1890 by W.T. Stead and Tit-Bits proprietor Sir George Newnes. It was originally to be called the Six Penny Monthly and Review of Reviews, but this was changed at the last minute. According to Stead, it was "the maddest thing" he had yet done, on account that the venture had been decided on only a month before.

The Review mirrored Stead's own over-active imagination and was written almost exclusively by him. Along with the dozens of magazine and book reviews it contained, it also included a running commentary of world events, entitled "The Progress of the World", and a character sketch of a current "celebrity". The first issue was an instant success, and opened with numerous facsimiled welcome messages which Stead had courted from various dignitaries of the time. However, Stead's relationship with Newnes came under strain when the latter strongly objected to Stead's scathing character sketch of The Times newspaper (eventually published in March).

Perhaps seeing this discord as a sign of things to come, Newnes severed ties, exclaiming that the whole venture was "turning his hair grey". After buying out Newnes's share, Stead shaped the Review after his own image. With article titles such as "Baby-killing as an Investment" and "Ought Mrs. Maybrick to be Tortured to Death?", Stead showed he had lost none of the sledge hammer force of his journalistic days. He also involved the Review in social work, setting up the "Association of Helpers" and even an adoption agency called "The Baby Exchange".

Stead was an early supporter and speaker of the language Esperanto and devoted one page to its promulgation in every issue.

In 1891–92, Stead founded the equally successful American and Australian editions of the Review, and, in London, he added to his success with other literary triumphs, such as book series The Penny Poets, Popular Penny Novels and Books for the Bairns, all published under the Review's auspices. However, in spite of such apparent successes, without the business-like Newnes to guide him, Stead frequently drove the Review to death's door, despite the best efforts of his business manager, Edwin H. Stout.

This was particularly the case during the Boer War (1899–1902), when his pro-Boer stance caused sales to slump to critical levels. Stead's attempt to recoup his losses, with the launch of the ill-fated The Daily Paper, was a complete failure and, almost bankrupt, he suffered a nervous breakdown. The Review somehow limped on, buoyed up by a narrow but devoted subscription base. But, following the loss of Stead in the Titanic disaster, it lost much of its force and, in c. 1917, was sold for just £25,000. It was eventually merged with World magazine and renamed the World Review in 1940. One of its latter editors was Lovat Dickson.

== The American Review of Reviews ==
The American Review of Reviews
- Editor: Albert Shaw
- Frequency: Monthly
- Founded: 1890
- Final issue: 1937
- Country: United States
- Based in: New York City
- Language: English

The American Review of Reviews was edited by the American academic, journalist, and reformer, Albert Shaw.

Published from New York, The American Review of Reviews ran simultaneously alongside its British counterpart. As such, it represented the views and concerns of participants in the trans-Atlantic culture of progressive reform discussed in Daniel T. Rodgers's Atlantic Crossings: Social Politics in a Progressive Age (1998).

Shaw was part of the first generation of academic reformers, which included Woodrow Wilson (who was his classmate at Johns Hopkins University). Born in Ohio, Shaw studied at Grinnell College and received his doctorate in government at Johns Hopkins in 1884. Declining an appointment at Cornell, Shaw became editor of the Minneapolis Tribune and a widely published author of books on municipal reform.

The American Review of Reviews is one of the best primary sources on American reform between 1890 and 1920, providing not only a panoramic view of the range of reformers' interests, but also the ties between British and American progressives. By volume 3, however, its style had departed significantly from that of its British cousin.

The American Review of Reviews ran until 1937, when it merged into The Literary Digest.

== See also ==
- 1901 Federal Flag Design Competition
- The Bookman
- Harper's Magazine
- McClure's Magazine
- Munsey's Magazine
- The Outlook
- World's Work Magazine
