= Perspectives on Sexual and Reproductive Health =

- Discipline: Reproductive health
- Language: English
- Edited by: Dore Hollander

Publication details
- Former name(s): Family Planning Perspectives
- History: 1969-2020
- Publisher: Wiley-Blackwell on behalf of the Guttmacher Institute
- Frequency: Bimonthly
- Impact factor: 3.571 (2016)

Standard abbreviations
- ISO 4: Perspect. Sex. Reprod. Health

Indexing
- ISSN: 1538-6341 (print); 1931-2393 (web)

Links
- Journal homepage; Online access; Online archive

Perspectives on Sexual and Reproductive Health was a bimonthly peer-reviewed medical journal covering reproductive health. It was established in 1969 as Family Planning Perspectives, obtaining its current name in 2002. It permanently ceased publication in 2020, alongside the Guttmacher Institute's other journal, International Perspectives on Sexual and Reproductive Health.

It was published by Wiley-Blackwell on behalf of the Guttmacher Institute. The final editor-in-chief was Dore Hollander. According to the Journal Citation Reports, the journal has a 2016 impact factor of 3.571, ranking it 1st out of 26 journals in the category "Demography" and 1st out of 43 journals in the category "Family studies."
