= International Perspectives on Sexual and Reproductive Health =

- Language: English

Publication details
- Former name: International Family Planning Perspectives
- History: 1975–2020
- Publisher: Guttmacher Institute (United States)
- Frequency: Quarterly

Standard abbreviations
- ISO 4: Int. Perspect. Sex. Reprod. Health

Indexing
- ISSN: 1944-0391 (print); 1944-0405 (web)
- LCCN: 82643004
- JSTOR: 19440391
- OCLC no.: 757444406

Links
- Journal homepage; Online archive

International Perspectives on Sexual and Reproductive Health, formerly International Family Planning Perspectives, was a peer-reviewed research journal published by the Guttmacher Institute, covering research on contraception, fertility, adolescent pregnancy, sexual behaviour, sexually transmitted diseases, the policy and law on family planning and childbearing, related programmes and dissemination of information, reproductive, maternal and child health, and abortion.

The journal was published quarterly from 1975. It permanently ceased publication in 2020.
