= Alexi Zentner =

American novelist

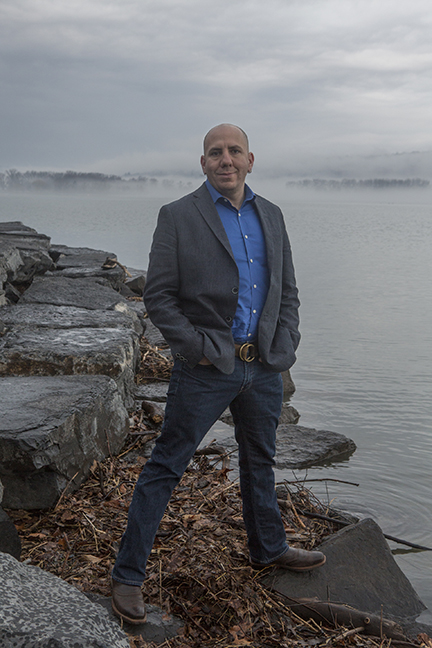
- Born: August 29, 1973 (age 52); Kitchener, Ontario, Canada
- Education: Grinnell College (BA); Cornell University (MFA)
- Occupations: Short story writer, novelist

Alexi Zentner (born August 29, 1973 in Kitchener, Ontario) is a Canadian-American short story writer, and novelist.

== Life ==
He graduated from Grinnell College with a BA and Cornell University with an MFA. He taught at Cornell University. He's now on the faculty at Binghamton University.

His fiction has also appeared in The Atlantic Monthly, Narrative Magazine (where it was awarded the 2008 Narrative Prize).

He lives in Ithaca, New York, with his wife and two children.

== Awards ==
His short story "Touch," originally published in Tin House is featured in The O. Henry Prize Stories 2008 where it was chosen as a jury favorite by author Chimamanda Ngozi Adichie. Two of Alexi's short stories were also selected for "special mention" in the 2008 Pushcart Prize anthology. "Trapline" was awarded the 2008 Narrative Prize.

His debut novel Touch was a longlisted nominee for the 2011 Scotiabank Giller Prize and shortlisted for the Governor General Award for English-language fiction.

== Works ==
=== Novels ===
- Copperhead (novel) (Penguin Random House, 2019)
- The Lobster Kings (W. W. Norton & Company, 2014)
- Touch (W. W. Norton & Company, 2011)

=== Short fiction ===
- "Touch", 2008
- "Trapline", Narrative Magazine, Fall 2008
- "Furlough", The Atlantic, August 2009

=== Anthologies ===
- Laura Furman, ed. (May 6, 2008). "Touch". The O. Henry Prize Stories 2008. Anchor. p. 319. ISBN 978-0-307-28034-3. "Alexi Zentner."
- Bill Henderson, ed. (December 10, 2007). Pushcart Prize XXXII. Pushcart Press. ISBN 978-1-888889-46-8.

Zentner also writes mysteries and horror novels under the pen name Ezekiel Boone.
