= Carol Edgarian =

American author, editor, and publisher

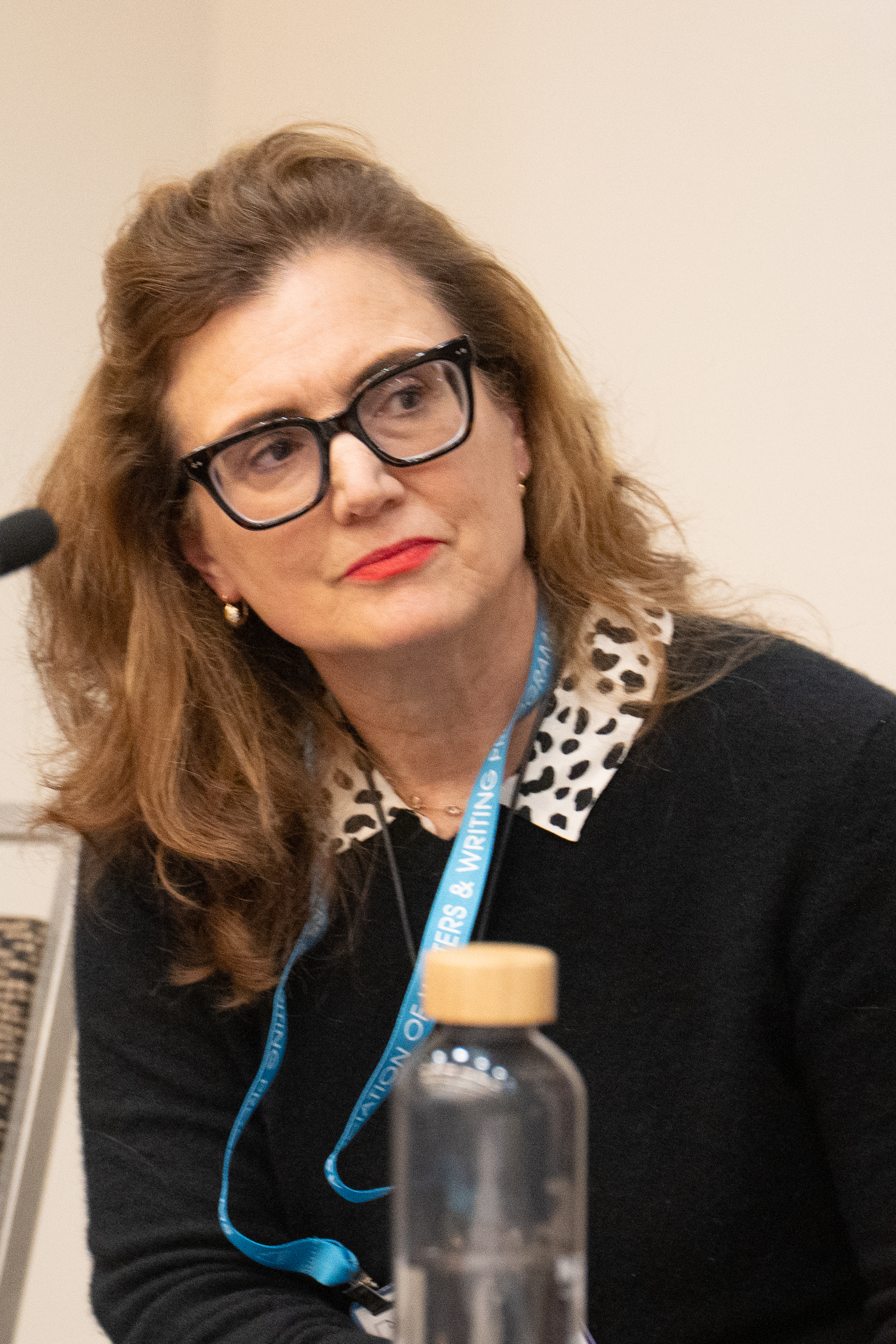
- Edgarian at AWP 2026
- Born: Carol Louise Edgarian; New Britain, Connecticut, U.S.
- Education: Phillips Academy; Stanford University (BA)
- Occupations: Writer; editor; publisher
- Writing career
- Notable works: Rise the Euphrates (1994); Three Stages of Amazement (2011)

Carol Louise Edgarian is an American writer, editor, and publisher. Her novels include Rise the Euphrates, Three Stages of Amazement, and Vera. She is the co-founder and editor of the non-profit Narrative Magazine, a digital publisher of fiction, poetry, non-fiction, and art; and founder of Narrative for Schools, whose programs provide free learning and teaching resources for students and educators.

== Early life ==
Born in New Britain, Connecticut, to first-generation parents, Edgarian grew up in the Hartford area. She attended Phillips Academy in Andover, Massachusetts, where she graduated cum laude, receiving the Kingsbury Prize and the Pamela Weidenman Prize in Art. She received her B.A. in English with from Stanford University.

She moved to San Francisco soon after college and, while writing her first novel, Rise the Euphrates, worked as a freelance speechwriter for high tech and retail companies, including Levi Strauss and the Mayfield Fund.

== Literary work ==
Edgarian entered the national literary scene with her debut novel Rise the Euphrates (1994). In its review, The Washington Post cited Rise the Euphrates as “a book whose generosity of spirit, intelligence, humanity, and finally ambition is what literature ought to be and rarely is today—daring, heartbreaking, and affirmative, giving order and sense to our random lives.” The Miami Herald called the novel “a stunning debut” and Mademoiselle magazine called Edgarian's writing “so good it can raise the hairs on your neck.” A twentieth-anniversary revised edition of the novel was released in 2015 to mark the centennial of the Armenian Genocide.

Edgarian's second novel, Three Stages of Amazement (2011) is both a love story and social chronicle of turbulent America set in San Francisco in 2009 during the Great Recession. The novel reached The New York Times Best Seller List in its first week of publication, O Magazine chose it as a Top Pick, and IndieBound selected it as a Pick of the Month. Three Stages of Amazement was called “furiously compelling” by Janet Maslin at The New York Times, “superbly crafted, skillfully plotted” by The Washington Post, and “generous and graceful and true” by O Magazine.

Set in San Francisco in 1906, Edgarian's third novel Vera tells the story of a fifteen-year-old girl, the daughter of the town's leading madam, coming of age in the aftermath of the city's devastating earthquake and fire. It centers on themes of displacement, societal upheaval, and reinvention with a cinematic cast of well known as well as fictional characters. Vera (2021) was an O Magazine Most Anticipated Read, an Indiebound Pick of the Month, and received a Booklist Starred Review. In its review, the Los Angeles Review of Books wrote about Vera: “If there's a book that speaks urgently to a time of grief, resilience, wounding loneliness, and collective hope in one of the deadliest pandemics in history, it is Vera — a work to be cherished for what it uncovers in the pages and, possibly, the heart of the reader.”

Among Edgarian's other works of fiction and non-fiction is The Writer's Life: Intimate Thoughts on Work, Love, Inspiration, and Fame which she co-edited with Tom Jenks (Vintage).

== Narrative Magazine and Narrative for Schools ==
In 2003, following the publication of her first novel, Edgarian co-founded the digital publisher and literary education platform Narrative Magazine with former Esquire, Gentlemen's Quarterly, and Scribner editor Tom Jenks. Narrative is a 501(c)(3) nonprofit.

Narrative publishes stories, poems, essays, interviews, and art weekly by both established and emerging writers. It offers seasonal contests, awards and educational programming via Narrative for Schools. Subscription to the platform is free and includes access to the entirety of Narrative’s library of fiction, poetry, non-fiction, and art and Narrative for the Schools programming.

In 2014, Edgarian launched Narrative for School to support under-resourced teachers and students by providing educational tools like reading guides and video writing tutorials for use in hybrid classrooms along with Narrative's library. Narrative reports that Narrative for Schools is used in classrooms in 35 countries and throughout the United States.

== Personal life ==
Edgarian lives in Northern California with her family.

== Awards ==
- 1994 ANC Freedom Award
- Bay Area Book Reviewers Best Fiction Prize (nominated)
- Best Debut of the Year (Chicago Tribune)

== Books ==
- Rise the Euphrates (1994)
- The Writer’s Life: Intimate Thoughts on Work, Love, Inspiration, and Fame (1997)
- Three Stages of Amazement (2011)
- Vera (2021)
