= Ioannis D. Evrigenis =

Greek-American political philosopher

- Education: Grinnell College
- Occupation: Professor
- Employer: Claremont McKenna College

Ioannis D. Evrigenis is a Greek-American political philosopher. He is the Alice Tweed Tuohy Professor of Government and Ethics at Claremont McKenna College.

== Biography ==
Evrigenis received his B.A. in political science from Grinnell College in 1993. He earned a M.Sc. from the London School of Economics & Political Science in 1994. From 1994 to 1996, Evrigenis served as an artillery quartermaster in the Hellenic Army, holding the rank of second lieutenant. In 2002, he received an M.A. in political science from Harvard University. In 2005, Evrigenis earned his Ph.D. in political science from Harvard. He received the Herrnstein Prize for his doctoral dissertation, "'Carthage Must be Saved': Fear of Enemies and Collective Action."

In the fall of 2005, appeared in Scipio's Dream (400B.C.). Evrigenis came to Tufts University as an assistant professor of political science. He was promoted to the position of associate professor in 2010, and he earned the full title of Professor in 2015. In the fall of 2015, Evrigenis also became the chair of Tufts' Department of Classics. He served in the role for three years before ceding the position to R. Bruce Hitchner following the 2018 spring semester.

== Bibliography ==
- Evrigenis, Ioannis D. (2008). Fear of Enemies and Collective Action. Cambridge, UK: Cambridge University Press. ISBN 978-0-521-88620-8.
- Evrigenis, Ioannis D. (2014). Images of Anarchy: The Rhetoric and Science in Hobbes's State of Nature. Cambridge, UK: Cambridge University Press. ISBN 978-0-521-51372-2.
- Herder, Johann Gottfried (2004). Another Philosophy of History and Selected Political Writings. Translated by Evrigenis, Ioannis D.; Pellerin, Daniel. Indianapolis: Hackett Publishing Company. ISBN 0-87220-716-1.
