= Rise the Euphrates =

1994 novel by Carol Edgarian

- First edition
- Author: Carol Edgarian
- Language: English
- Genre: Novel
- Publisher: Random House
- Publication date: 1994
- Publication place: United States
- Media type: Print (hardback)
- Pages: 370 pp
- ISBN: 978-0-679-42601-1
- OCLC: 28710755
- Dewey Decimal: 813/.54 20
- LC Class: PS3555.D464 R57 1994

Rise the Euphrates is a 1994 novel by American writer Carol Edgarian. It concerns three generations of Armenian American women living in Memorial, Connecticut during the twentieth century. Rather than focus on a central character, the book contains the story of three generations: the grandmother Casard, her daughter Araxie, and granddaughter, Seta. The struggles faced by each woman show the enduring effects of the Armenian genocide which occurred in 1915 at the hands of the Young Turks. A major theme in both Edgarian's work and Armenian-American literature is the ability to reconcile the genocide, lost identity, and displacement of the past to life in present-day America. In Rise the Euphrates, this reconciliation is symbolized in the recovering of Casard's lost name, Garod.

== Plot summary ==
Rise the Euphrates begins with Casard's story. At the time of the genocide, Casard is ten and still goes by her original Armenian name Garod. In Armenian, “Garod” means yearning which is what Casard does the rest of her life: yearn for an Armenia which no longer exists. Casard's mother's name is Seta, the same name given to Casard's granddaughter.

The Turks invaded Garod's town of Harput, murdering the men and raping many women and girls. Among those to escape rape and death, Garod and her mother Seta are driven out of town into the desert. After walking for two weeks without water or food, the caravan reaches the Euphrates River. The river lies in front of the caravan, and a band of murdering Turks emerges from behind, forcing a choice; death by drowning or death by Turkish sword. Seta takes Garod's hand and prepares to jump into the Euphrates. At the last second, Garod remains on the bank and watches her mother drown. Turning around, Garod sees the band of Turks departing. Garod then wanders in the desert for several days, forgetting her name in the process. Later, under the care of nuns, Garod is given the name Cafard, which is a French word meaning melancholy of the soul. She eventually emigrates to the United States. At Ellis Island, immigration officials hear her name as Casard. While at Ellis Island, Casard meets, and after an afternoon of courtship, marries her husband Vrej; another exiled Armenian. Casard and Vrej had one daughter, Araxie.

Araxie grows up and marries an odar, a non Armenian husband, named George Loon. George and Araxie have three children, Van, Seta, and Melanie. When Seta is born, Casard takes Seta into her arms and whispers her story of the genocide. Casard then tells Seta that her task is to recover Casard's forgotten name. Araxie was also given the task to find Casard's name. However, one generation removed from the genocide has left Araxie near Casard's pain to achieve the type of reconciliation Seta is capable of.

Seta's younger years are marked with the tensions occurring between her mother and grandmother. Casard dies unexpectedly when Seta is twelve from a fatal car crash. Similar to the Armenian genocide, the Loon family life after Casard's death is never the same once Casard is gone. The remainder of the book highlights Seta's growing up years. However, with Casard's passing, Seta's life becomes more American and less Armenian-American. Araxie finds herself without a final opportunity to reconcile with her mother and becomes depressed. Later she divorces George Loon. Without Casard, the family structure and its place in the Armenian- American community disintegrates. Despite this, Seta remembers Casard's hidden story and the desire that her lost name be recovered. This recovery is achieved through another Armenian-American girl, Theresa Van.

Several years later, Seta betrays Theresa with a lie in order to secure her own popularity. After this betrayal, the girls do not interact for several years. Shortly after Seta and Theresa turn 15, Theresa's mother dies. A few weeks after her mother's death, Theresa is abducted and severely beaten by a well known member of the town. While Theresa is recuperating, Seta brings offerings of sorts to Theresa's house. Her interaction with Theresa and the offerings she brings draw Seta back into the Armenian community. At the end of the book, Seta and Theresa play the duduk together.

That night after playing the duduk with Theresa, and wholly embracing her Armenian heritage, Seta dreams of the women who were at the Euphrates River the day Casard forgot her name. The women tell the story of what Casard was only able to verbalize as “the indignities”. When she wakes up from her dream, Seta has recovered Casard's name, Garod, which she then relays to Araxie.

== Major themes ==
=== Matrilineal approach ===
In Rise the Euphrates, the main characters are all women. Seta discovers her Armenian heritage by interacting with her mother and grandmother. In other words, the book is concerned with a matrilineal approach. Commonly found in Armenian-American literature is what is known as a patrilineal approach. This means the main characters are typically male. The characters discover their Armenian heritage through interactions with fathers and grandfathers rather than mothers and grandmothers. Common to the patrilineal approach is the idea of discovering the Armenian homeland. In the matrilineal approach, discovering identity is highlighted. Each of these, discovering the Armenian homeland and discovering sources of identity, are ways to reconcile- comes to terms with – the Armenian Genocide.

=== Oral storytelling ===
For hundreds of years in Armenia, Armenians maintained their sense of identity through the Armenian language and the Armenian Apostolic Church. In the United States this did not change. For Armenians living in the United States, much of Armenian culture is still kept alive through language and religion. Because of the importance of language to the culture, stories and oral story telling are very important. In Rise the Euphrates, the stories themselves are an integral part of the book. The emphasis in the book is on Casard's story; however, through the other stories Edgarian includes, the reader will further understand Armenian culture and the tradition of storytelling.

=== Betrayal myth ===
A central myth in Carol Edgarian's Rise the Euphrates is the betrayal myth. Edgarian names several betrayal myths in her book, among them, the biblical stories of Cain and Abel, and Judas and Christ.

== Awards and nominations ==
In 1994, Rise the Euphrates won the ANC Freedom Award. It was also nominated for the Bay Area Book Reviewers Best Fiction Prize.

== See also ==
- Armenian American literature
