= Sterling Lord =

American literary agent (1920–2022)

- Born: September 3, 1920; Burlington, Iowa, U.S.
- Died: September 3, 2022 (aged 102); Ocala, Florida, U.S.
- Education: Grinnell College (BA)
- Occupations: Literary editor; editor; author
- Spouse: Four times divorced
- Children: 1

Sterling Lord (September 3, 1920 – September 3, 2022) was an American literary agent, editor, and author. His clients included Jack Kerouac, Ken Kesey, Howard Fast, Jimmy Breslin, and Doris Kearns Goodwin.

== Early life and education ==
Lord was born in Burlington, Iowa, on September 3, 1920. His father, also named Sterling, was an executive at the Leopold Desk Company in Burlington who also worked as a bookbinder. Aldo Leopold, a scientist and writer, was his uncle. While in high school, Lord was the school's newspaper editor. He also became a tennis singles champ in 1937 and 1938 and was ranked nationally in both the Boys and Juniors Divisions. In 1976, his book Returning The Serve Intelligently was included in the United States Tennis Instructional Series published by Doubleday. Lord studied English at Grinnell College, graduating with a bachelor's degree in 1942.

== Career ==
After graduation, Lord joined the U.S. Army during World War II, and was an editor for a weekly magazine supplement of Stars and Stripes. The Army discontinued the magazine in 1948, but Lord co-owned it as a private publication for a year afterwards.

Lord then moved to New York City and entered the publishing industry. A magazine called Weekend which he bought with a partner, Evan Jones, failed, and he was fired from Cosmopolitan magazine. In 1951, he founded his own business, a literary shop in New York City. In 1952, he launched his literary agency, later merging with another agency, Literistic, to form Sterling Lord Literistic, Inc. Kerouac entrusted him with his novel On the Road, and after more than four years Viking Press bought and published it. Lord's other noted clients included Jimmy Breslin, Ken Kesey with One Flew Over the Cuckoo's Nest, historian Doris Kearns Goodwin, and political figures like John Sirica, Robert McNamara, and Ted Kennedy.

Open Road published Lord's memoir Lord of Publishing in 2013.

In 2015, the city of Burlington held its first Sterling Lord Writers and Readers Festival to honor him. Five years later, during the coronavirus pandemic, Lord was profiled among other senior New Yorkers in The New York Times. The article reported that Lord was living in a Lower Manhattan home for seniors, and he was starting a new literary agency at 99 years old. One author represented by his new agency was Lawrence Ferlinghetti. Little Boy, part novel, part memoir, was published by Doubleday in time for Ferlinghetti's 100th birthday.

== Personal life ==
Lord's four marriages all ended in divorce. He had one daughter. He died in Ocala, Florida, on September 3, 2022, his 102nd birthday.

== See also ==
- List of Grinnell College alumni
