= Grinnell Herald-Register =

- Type: Weekly newspaper
- Format: Broadsheet
- Publisher: Al and Dorothy Pinder
- Founded: 1936
- Headquarters: United States
- Circulation: 2,204
- OCLC number: 10929136
- Website: https://newspaperarchive.com/us/iowa/grinnell/grinnell-herald-register/

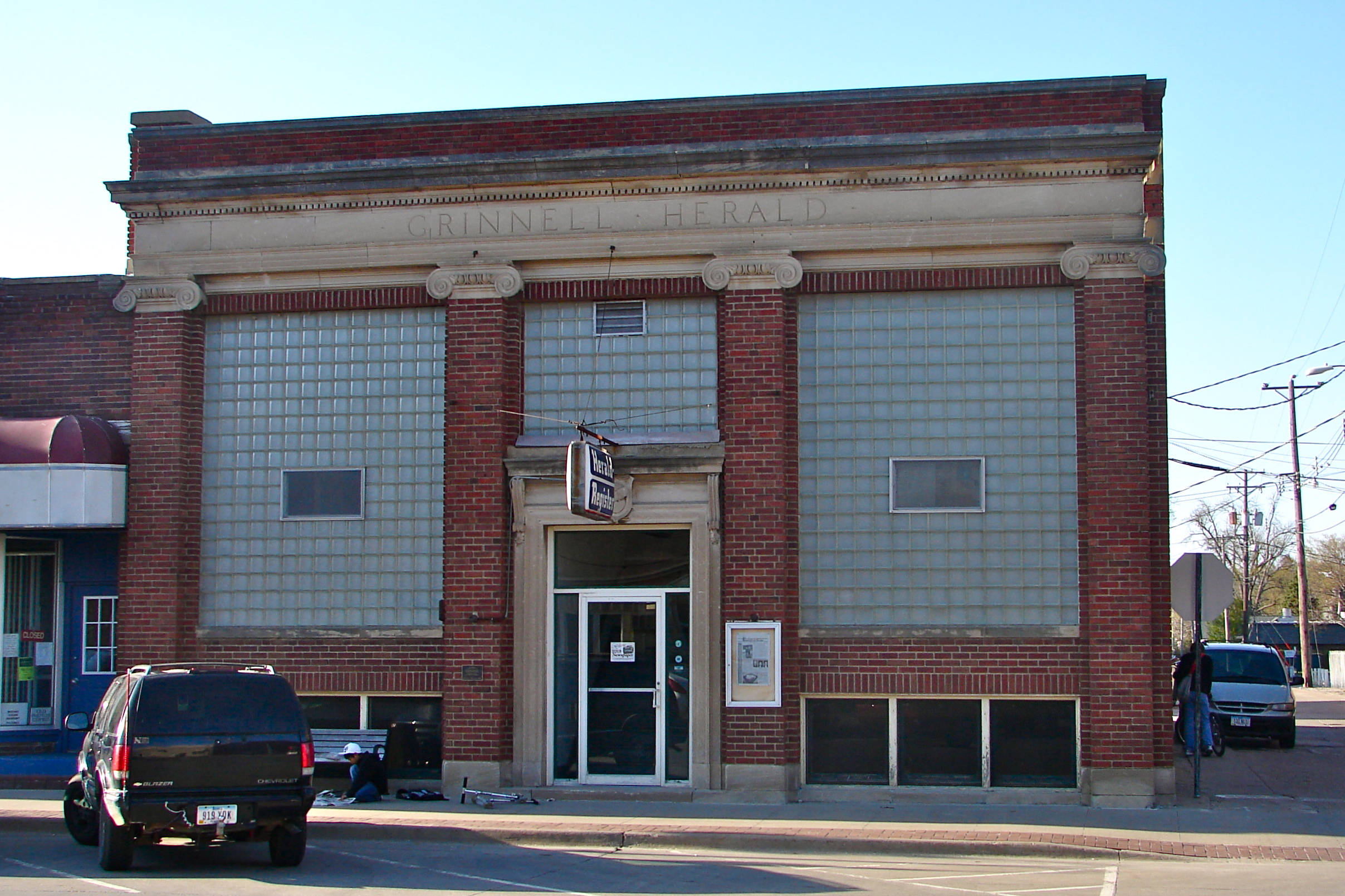
Grinnell Herald Building Listed on the NRHP since January 17, 1991

The Grinnell Herald-Register is a semi-weekly newspaper in Grinnell, Iowa. It was formed February 13, 1936 after the merger of the Grinnell Herald and Grinnell Register. The Herald was founded on August 16, 1871 as a semi-weekly newspaper, and the Register was founded in 1888. The Grinnell Herald, in turn, was founded as the Poweshiek County Herald on March 18, 1868. In 1944, the newspaper was purchased by the Pinder family. It remains a family owned paper as of 2022.

The paper was published by Al and Dorothy Pinder until their deaths. Their daughters, Martha Pinder and Peggy Elliot manage and edit the paper as of 2022.
