= Sharon Louden =

American artist (born 1964)

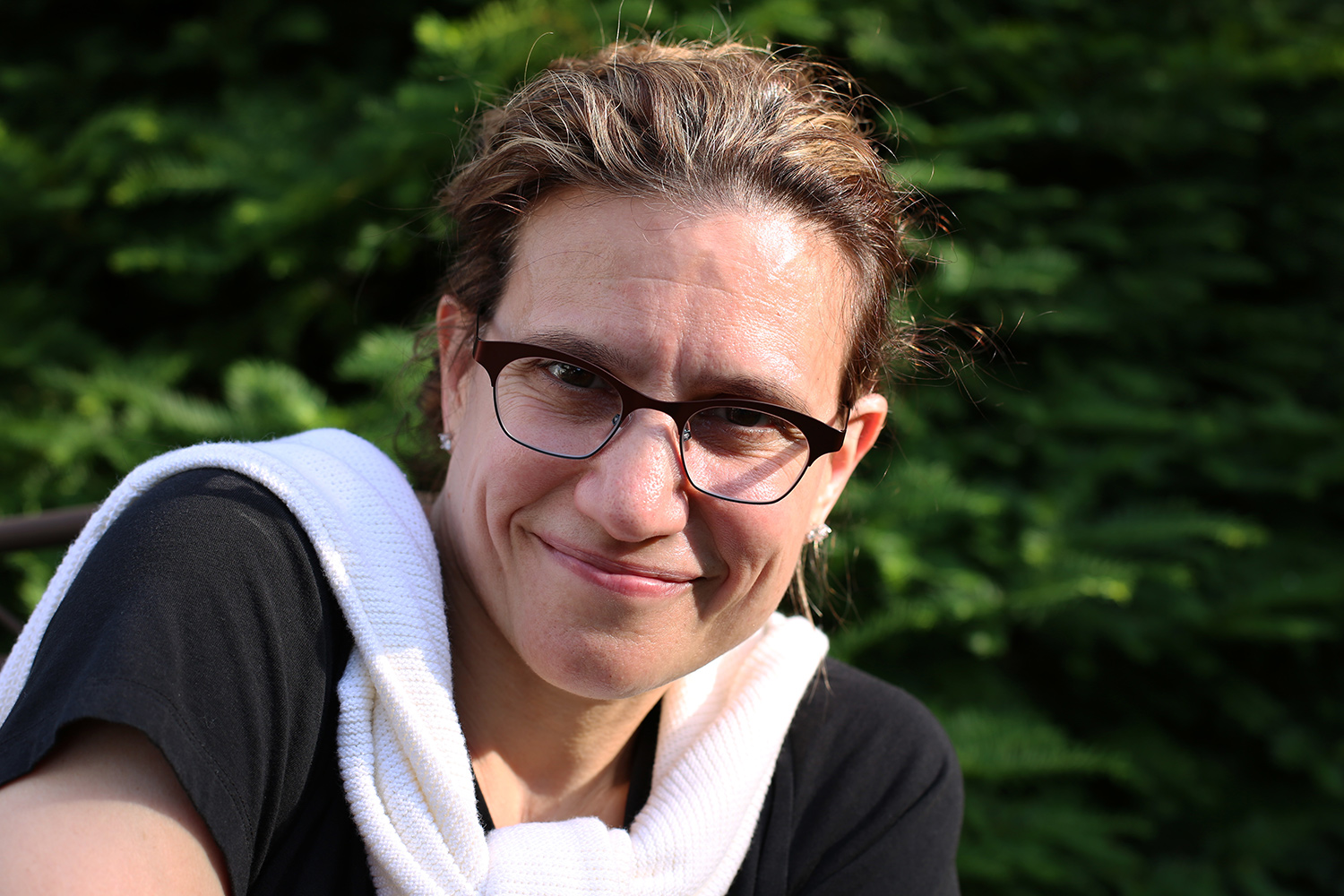
- Born: 1964 (age 61–62); Philadelphia, PA
- Education: School of the Art Institute of Chicago, Yale School of Art
- Website: Sharonlouden.com

Sharon Louden (born 1964) is a visual artist known for her abstract and whimsical use of the line. Her minimalist paintings and drawings have subsequently transformed over the years into other media (animation, sculpture, and installation), being expressed as "drawings-in-space." She has also expanded into a wide-ranging use of color. In reference to her minimalist paintings, Louden has been called "the Robert Ryman of the 21st century."

== Notable works ==
Louden has become known for her variety of large-scale installations that use suspended aluminum, fiber optics with glass rods, and colorful vinyl. In October 2011, Louden's installation Merge opened at the Weisman Art Museum in Minneapolis, Minnesota. Merge was created in dialogue with the new addition to the Frank Gehry-designed Weisman Art Museum in Minneapolis, Minnesota. The first iteration of Merge was exhibited at the Munson Williams Proctor Institute Museum of Art in 2004 and evolved since then. Of Merge, Janet Koplos of Art in America writes "...the energetic Merge, perhaps Louden’s best work to date, clearly succeeds on its own merits and would be satisfying anywhere."

Upon completion of an exhibition of suspended aluminum in early 2017 entitled, Windows at the Tweed Museum of Art, she was commissioned for a permanent installation using suspended aluminum in the lobby of a public building in Houston, Texas. Subsequent iterations of Windows were completed at the University of Wyoming Museum of Art (2018-2020), Philbrook Museum of Art (2019–2020), a permanent installation in the lobby of a new public building in Oklahoma City, Oklahoma., and in Freedom Tower (Miami) in 2025.

During the pandemic, she collaborated remotely with art students to create an outdoor installation of colored glass and rock that celebrated the 100th anniversary of Women's Suffrage in the United States, an exhibition that also featured a new animation.

In the summer 2023 at Breck Create (Breckenridge, CO), she suspended aluminum, placed colored vinyl on the walls and floors, and hung works on paper in an installation that addressed societal barriers historically preventing women and underprivileged from moving forward past obstacles.

Louden's work is held in major public and private collections including the Whitney Museum of American Art, National Gallery of Art, Neuberger Museum of Art, Arkansas Arts Center, Yale University Art Gallery, Weatherspoon Art Museum, and the Museum of Fine Arts, Houston. She has received a grant from the Elizabeth Foundation, New York Foundation for the Arts, and the Ford Foundation and has participated in residencies at the Tamarind Institute, Urban Glass, Art Omi, and The Marie Walsh Sharpe Art Foundation.

Her work is represented by Engage Projects in Chicago, Signs & Symbols Gallery in New York City, Patrick Heide Contemporary Art in London, Cheryl Numark Art Advisory in Washington, DC, and Holly Johnson Gallery in Dallas, Texas.

== Early life and education ==
Sharon Louden was born in Philadelphia, Pennsylvania, and raised in Olney, Maryland. Louden has three siblings: Mimi Louden Weaver, Karen Louden Allanach, and Jill Louden. Louden graduated from Sherwood High School in Sandy Spring, Maryland. She received her BFA from the School of the Art Institute of Chicago (SAIC) in 1988, where she studied with Dan Gustin and Susanna Coffey. Louden received her MFA from Yale School of Art in 1991. At Yale, her mentors were Mel Bochner, William Bailey, Andrew Forge, and Frances Barth. She received Yale's Schickle-Collingwood Prize in 1990.

Louden studied figurative painting at SAIC. During her education at Yale, her work merged into abstraction.

== Career ==
=== Selected Solo Exhibitions ===
"Merge" - University of Connecticut, Storrs, CT - 2013

Breck Create, Breckenridge, CO
Engage Project, Chicago, IL
Philbrook Museum of Art, Tulsa, OK
Signs & Symbols Gallery, New York, NY
University of Wyoming Art Museum, Laramie, WY
Tweed Museum of Art, Duluth, MN
Morgan Lehman Gallery, New York, NY
Holly Johnson Gallery, Dallas, TX
Weisman Art Museum, Minneapolis, MN
Weatherspoon Art Museum, Greensboro, NC
Neuberger Museum of Art, Purchase, NY
DiverseWorks ArtSpace, Houston, TX

=== Selected Collections ===
Louden's work is held in major public and private collections throughout the United States, Asia and Europe including:

- Museum of Art and Design Miami Dade College
- Arkansas Museum of Fine Arts
- Birmingham Museum of Art
- Cleveland Clinic
- Delaware Art Museum
- General Mills
- Hallmark Cards Corporation
- Microsoft Corporation
- Museum of Art and Design Miami Dade College
- Museum of Fine Arts, Houston
- National Gallery of Art
- National Museum of Women in the Arts
- Neuberger Museum of Art
- Panasonic USA
- Pfizer, Inc., World Headquarters
- Progressive Corporation
- San Francisco General Hospital
- Weatherspoon Art Museum
- Weisman Art Museum
- Whitney Museum of American Art
- Yale University Art Gallery
- Werner H. Kramarsky

=== Animations ===
"Carrier" - still shot of animation - 2011

Sharon Louden has exhibited her animations in galleries, museums, and film festivals across the country. Her inspirations include Shel Silverstein.

Her first series of animations were included in a 2006 solo exhibition entitled "Character," which was a survey of paintings, drawings, installations, prints, and animation at the Neuberger Museum of Art, curated by Dede Young. Also in 2006, "Pool" was included in the Art Video Lounge exhibition curated by Michael Rush for the Art Basel Miami Art Fair.

Many of her animations were surveyed in various children's film festivals in the US from 2008–2009. In particular, "The Bridge," completed in 2008, was shown at the Birmingham Museum of Art, Weatherspoon Art Museum, Johnson Museum of Art at Cornell University, and Gallery Joe in Philadelphia, Pennsylvania. It was also screened at the Queens International Film Festival and the New York Downtown Film Festival Audience Choice Screening in 2009. Because of the positive audience response at the screening, "The Bridge" was selected for inclusion in the New York Downtown Film Festival in 2010. Her animations have also been shown at the Athens International Film and Video Festival in Athens, Ohio, and the Honolulu International Film Festival, where she received an award for Excellence in Filmmaking in 2009. In 2010, Louden was the recipient of the Bronze Palm Award from the Mexico International Film Festival for "The Bridge."

Between 2011 and 2017, Louden was commissioned by the National Gallery of Art to both create new animations and to help curate three film screenings of abstract animation: Ciné-Concert: Art in Motion! (2011), Ciné-Concert: Abstract Film Since 1970 (2013), and Ciné-Concert: Contemporary Experiments in Animation (2017). "Footprints", "Hedge", "The Bridge", and "Carrier" were screened in the East Wing Auditorium in 2011; "Community in 2013; and "Untitled (in dialogue with Len Lye, "Free Radicals")" in 2017. During these programs, Louden's animations were screened with other notable works, such as "Lines Horizontal" by Norman McLaren (1962); "Two Space" by Larry Cuba (1979); "Free Radicals" by Len Lye (1958); "Symphonie Diagonal" Viking Eggeling (1924); "Silence" Jules Engel (1968); and "Chemical Sundown" by Jeremy Blake (2001), to name a few. All of the animations were accompanied by live piano and percussion compositions by Andrew Simpson. Stills of animations appear in various published catalogs, such as: "Character", "Taking Turns" and "The Bridge". Ten animations (2005–2011) are also included in the Iota Center's library collection.

=== Public Works ===
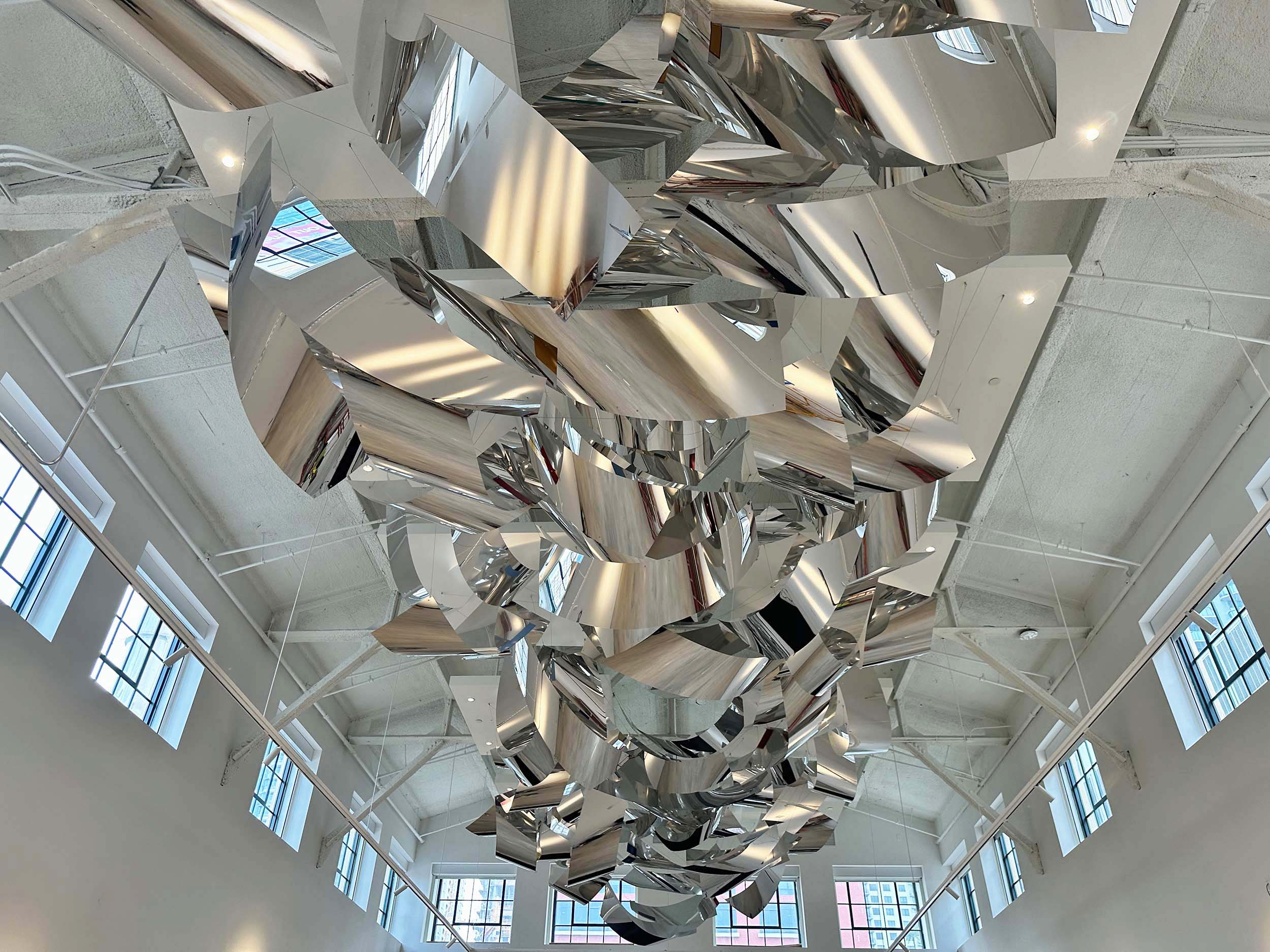
"Windows of Freedom Tower," Museum of Art and Design Miami Dade College, Freedom Tower, Miami, FL (2025)

"Reflecting Tips" - Yahoo! Corp. Headquarters, Sunnyvale, CA - 2001

Louden has worked in the realm of public art since 1998. Her work often includes industrial materials that are transformed to resemble forms in nature, including movement that references the human body. Permanent public art projects include "Reflecting Tips" in Sunnyvale, California (1999–2008), "Untitled" in Houston, Texas (2017), "Windows: Reflections of Mabrey" in Oklahoma City, Oklahoma (2020), and "Windows of Freedom Tower" in Miami, FL (2025). In 2013, Louden was commissioned by the Connecticut Department of Community and Economic Development Art in Public Spaces Program for a permanent site-specific large-scale installation located in Oak Hall at the University of Connecticut, entitled "Merge at University of Connecticut".

Louden has also made temporary public art installations, such as "Tangled Tips" at Metro Tech business park in Brooklyn, NY, through the Public Art Fund in 2000.

=== Book Projects ===
Louden is the editor of three books: Living and Sustaining a Creative Life: Essays by 40 Working Artists, Artist as Culture Producer: Living and Sustaining a Creative Life, and Last Artist Standing: Living and Sustaining a Creative Life Over 50, all three published by Intellect Books and distributed by the University of Chicago Press.

The first book includes essays by artists Julie Blackmon, Sharon Butler, Amanda Church, Maureen Connor, Will Cotton, Blane de St. Croix, Jennifer Dalton, Karin Davie, Peter Drake, Carson Fox, Michelle Grabner, the Art Guys, Ellen Harvey, Julie Heffernan, David Humphrey, Richard Klein, Beth Lipman, Jenny Marketou, Maggie Michael, Adrienne Outlaw, Amy Pleasant, Melissa Potter, Justin Quinn, and Kate Shepherd, as well as a foreword by Carter Foster, deputy director of the Blanton Museum of Art and a conclusion by Ed Winkleman and Bill Carroll, director of the Elizabeth Foundation for the Arts Studio Program.

Contributors to Louden's "Artist as Culture Producer" include Alec Soth (Little Brown Mushroom), Alison Wong (Butter Projects), Andrea Zittel, Carrie Moyer (Dyke Action Machine), Chloe Bass, Edgar Arceneaux, Mark Tribe, Matthew Deleget (Minus Space), Morehshin Allahyari, Paul Henry Ramirez, Sharon Butler (Two Coats of Paint), Steve Lambert (The Center for Artistic Activism), Tim Doud and Zoë Charlton ('sindikit), Wendy Red Star, William Powhida. Additional contributors include: Hrag Vartanian, editor-in-chief and co-founder of Hyperallergic (foreword), Deana Haggag, director of USA Artists in Chicago, Courtney Fink, and Chen Tamir - former Curator at the Center for Contemporary Art in Tel Aviv, Israel (Conclusion).

Her third book, entitled "Last Artist Standing: Living and Sustaining a Creative Life over 50," includes essays by 31 artists and was published in May 2025 by Intellect Books.

Contributors to "Last Artist Standing" include Audrey Flack, Katinka Mann, Maren Hassinger, Martha Wilson, Nina Kuo, Nancy Grossman, Nayland Blake, Romy Achituv, Squeak Carnwath, Susanna Coffey, and Valerie Maynard.

In addition, she is the Senior Editor of the "Living and Sustaining a Creative Life" series of books and has selected other editors covering different topics, such as "Storytellers of Art Histories: Living and Sustaining a Creative Life" and "Artists as Writers: Living and Sustaining a Creative Life"

=== Book Tours ===
Louden organized two book tours between 2013 and 2018 to support her first two books. A few of the 164 book events included: Hirshhorn Museum, Strand Bookstore (NYC), Salina Arts Center, Curb Center for Art, Enterprise, and Public Policy; Seed Space, Cannonball at Locust Projects, University of Florida, Gainesville, Columbia College, University of Illinois, Urbana Champaign; School of the Art Institute of Chicago, Bad at Sports at the Pulse Art Fair in Miami Beach, Otis School of Art and Design, The Standard Hotel (L.A.), Los Angeles County Museum of Art, Richmond Art Center, Oakland, CA, Elizabeth Foundation, NYC; University of North Texas, Denton, TX; Holly Johnson Gallery Dallas, TX; Real Art Ways Hartford, CT; AS220, Providence, RI; Boston Public Library, Chautauqua Institution, International Sculpture Center, Maryland Institute College of Art, Rockland Center for the Arts, Rehoboth Art League, Maine College of Art, Bowdoin College Museum of Art, Asheville Art Museum, Aberson Exhibits in Tulsa, OK, Society of the Four Arts in Palm Beach, FL, Girls Club Foundation, Sea Change Conference at the University of Minnesota (Twin Cities), Minnesota Museum of American Art, and Rochester Art Center, among many other stops.

Louden's third book tour began in Fall 2024 and will continue into 2027 with nearly 90 stops planned. Venues include: Museum of Contemporary Art, Cleveland, OH, Vanderbilt University, Nashville, TN, McColl Center, Charlotte, NC, and Al Held Foundation, Boiceville, NY, to name a few.

=== Professional Experience ===
Sharon Louden has taught studio and professional practice classes to students of all levels in colleges and universities throughout the United States since 1991, including Kansas City Art Institute, the College of Saint Rose, Massachusetts College of Art, Maryland Institute College of Art, New York Academy of Art, University of North Texas, Vanderbilt University,Tyler School of Art, and School of Visual Arts. She conducts online Professional Practice Workshops for artists in collaboration with non-profit organizations, such as Creative Capital, Americans for the Arts, and the Brooklyn Arts Council. Between 2018 and 2022, she became the first woman Artistic Director of the Visual Arts at Chautauqua Institution in Western New York.

Since 1999, Louden has led an art-making workshop for children entitled "Glowtown". Hosting venues include museums, non-profit art centers, and public schools: the Aldrich Contemporary Art Museum (1999), Katonah Museum of Art (2005), Peekskill High School in Peekskill, New York (2005), the Birmingham Museum of Art (2008), the 5.4.7 Arts Center in Greensburg, Kansas (2010), the Community Library in Ketchum, Idaho (2011), the Pelham Arts Center in Pelham, New York (2012), the Weisman Art Museum in Minneapolis, Minnesota (2016), the Philbrook Museum of Art in Tulsa, Oklahoma (2019), and Breck Create in Breckenridge, CO (2023).

From February 2012 to February 2014, Louden served as the Chair of the Services to Artists Committee of the College Art Association. She has also contributed as a board member for various non-profit organizations, including Seed Space, the Elizabeth Foundation for the Arts, and Franconia Sculpture Park. She is a founding board member of Foundwork.art (2022) and a current board member of the Jentel Artist Residency. She has volunteered her time as an advisory board member of the Visual Arts at Chautauqua Institution, New York Foundation for the Arts, Carolyn Glasoe Bailey Foundation, and the Ox-Bow School of Art and Artists Residency.

=== Lecture Series ===
Between 2009 and 2019, Louden organized and moderated the Professional Practice Lecture Series at the New York Academy of Art, which included Randy Cohen, Deana Haggag, Hrag Vartanian, Andrianna Campbell, Jerry Saltz, Roberta Smith, Robert Storr, Ken Johnson, Caroline Woolard, William Powhida, and Paddy Johnson.

=== Institute for Sustained Creativity ===
Sharon Louden is the founder and director of a peer-to-peer service nonprofit organization (pending) for artists and arts organizations. The Institute for Sustained Creativity (ISC) provides guidance, micro-strategies, and match-making among disparate stakeholders to address the myriad issues facing artists today.

"For three decades, Louden has combined a thriving studio practice with advocacy on behalf of other artists; the latter path gives her as much joy as putting paint on canvas does."

== Personal life ==
She is married to a media producer, jazz musician and activist Vinson Valega and lives and works in New York City.
