= 2010 in art =

The year 2010 in art involved various significant events.

== Events ==
- February 3 – The sculpture L'Homme qui marche I by Alberto Giacometti sells in London for £65 million, at this time a new world record for a work of art sold at auction.
- February–March – Artist Michael Landy hosts the Art Bin.
- March – Lawrence Salander, the former proprietor of the now closed Salander/O'Reilly Galleries pleads guilty to 29 felony counts of grand larceny and in August is sentenced to six to eighteen years in prison.
- March 3 – The New Museum in New York sparks controversy with Skin Fruit: Selections from the Dakis Joannou Collection by deciding to exhibit works from the private collection of one of its trustees.
- May – MAXXI the new and first Italian national museum of contemporary art designed by architect Zaha Hadid opens in Rome.
- May 4 – Nude, Green Leaves and Bust a 1932 painting by Pablo Picasso is sold at Christie's for $106.5 million. There are more than half a dozen bidders, while the winning bid is taken via telephone.
- May 20 – Five paintings including works by Picasso and Matisse worth €100 million are stolen from the Musée d'Art Moderne de la Ville de Paris.
- June 9 – American Cable television Bravo premieres a new series Work of Art: The Next Great Artist. Produced by Sarah Jessica Parker, judges included Jerry Saltz, China Chow Jeanne Greenberg Rohatyn, Bill Powers, and Simon de Pury.
- June 16 – The Royal Cornwall Museum in England sells two Victorian paintings (Herbert James Draper's The Sea Maiden and Ernest Normand's Bondage) at Christie's to help secure its finances.
- August – Launch of John Moores Painting Prize China.
- October – Ai Weiwei's Sunflower Seeds (painted porcelain) installed in Tate Modern's Turbine Hall.
- December 6 – Museo del Novecento (Museum of Twentieth Century), dedicated to Italian Art of the Twentieth Century, with a small collection of other related European art opens in Milan.

== Exhibitions ==
- January 20 until April 18 – The Drawings of Bronzino at the Metropolitan Museum of Art in New York City.
- March 14 until May 31 – Marina Abramović, "The Artist is Present" at MoMA in New York City.
- "Matisse: Radical Invention 1913–1917" at The Art Institute of Chicago (March 20 – June 20) and MoMA, New York (July 18 – October 11), curated by Stephanie D'Alessandro and John Elderfield.
- June 13 until September 12 - Picasso Looks at Degas at the Clark Art Institute in Williamstown, Massachusetts.
- September 24 until January 11, 2011 – Bronzino Artist and Poet at the Court of The Medici in Florence, Italy.
- October 20 until January 30, 2011 – "David Hockney: Fleurs Fraiches (Fresh Flowers)" at the Foundation Pierre Bergé—Yves Saint Laurent in Paris, curated by Charlie Scheips.
- December 19 until March 21, 2011 – "Andy Warhol: Motion Pictures" at MoMA in New York City.

== Works ==
- Maurizio Cattelan – "L.O.V.E" (sculpture)
- Olafur Eliasson – Colour Activity House (21st Century Museum of Contemporary Art, Kanazawa, Japan)
- Loren Madsen - Nobori (sculpture)
- Teresa Margolles – Muro Ciudad Juárez (installation/sculpture)
- Jonathan Meese – Die Humpty-Dumpty-Maschine der totalen Zukunft (sculpture)
- Julie Mehretu – Mural at Goldman Sachs Headquarters in New York City
- Cy Twombly - Ceiling Mural in the Salle des Bronzes of the Louvre in Paris, France

== Awards ==
- Archibald Prize – Sam Leach for "Tim Minchin"
- Artes Mundi Prize – Yael Bartana
- Bucksbaum Award – Michael Asher,
- Henry Hope Reed Award for classical art and design – Vincent Scully
- John Moores Painting Prize – Keith Coventry for "Spectrum Jesus"

== Deaths ==
- January 5 – Kenneth Noland, 85, American Color Field painter
- January 27 – Eduardo Michaelsen, 89, Cuban exile Naive painter
- January 30
  - Lucienne Day, 93, British textile designer
  - Ursula Mommens, 101, British potter
- February 25 – Ernst Beyeler, 88, Swiss art dealer and collector
- March 1 – Ruth Kligman, 80, American painter, known as the muse of several important American artists of the mid 20th century notably Jackson Pollock, and Willem de Kooning, and only survivor of Jackson Pollock's fatal car accident
- March 26 – Charles Ryskamp, 81, American art collector and former director of The Frick Collection and The Morgan Library & Museum
- March 15 – Elaine Hamilton, American painter
- April 6 – Hans Schröder, 78, German sculptor and painter
- April 20
  - Robert Natkin, 79, American Abstract painter
  - Purvis Young, 67, American Abstract artist
- April 21 – Deborah Remington, 79, American Abstract artist
- April 24 – Giuseppe Panza, 87, Italian art collector
- April 29 – Avigdor Arikha, 81, Israeli painter, printmaker, and art historian
- May 9 – Craig Kauffman, 78, American Abstract artist
- May 18 – Shusaku Arakawa, 73, Japanese painter, conceptual artist and architect
- May 29 – Dennis Hopper, 74, American actor and visual artist
- May 30 – Lester Johnson, 91, American painter
- May 31 – Louise Bourgeois, 98, French-born American sculptor, artist
- June 3 – John Hedgecoe, 78, English photographer and author
- June 6 – Paul Wunderlich, 83, German painter, sculptor and graphic artist
- June 7 – Omar Rayo, 82, Colombian painter and sculptor
- June 10 – Sigmar Polke, 69, German painter and photographer
- June 19 – Paul Thiebaud, 49, American gallerist, art dealer
- June 29 – Doug Ohlson, 73, American painter
- July 1 – Arnold Friberg, 96, American painter
- July 15 – Nicolas Carone, 93, American painter
- September 4 – Paul Conrad, 86, American political cartoonist and sculptor
- September 14 – Ralph T. Coe, 81, American art museum director (Nelson-Atkins Museum of Art)
- September 23 – Stephen Pace, 91, American painter
- October 2 – Robert Goodnough, 92, American painter
- October 8 – Karl Prantl, 86, Austrian sculptor
- October 24 – Sylvia Sleigh, 94 American painter
- November 8 – Jack Levine, 95, American Social realist painter
- November 14 – Nathan Oliveira, 81, American painter
- November 23 – Nassos Daphnis, 96, American painter
- December 17 – Captain Beefheart, 69, American musician and visual artist
- December 24 – John Warhola, 85, American museum founder (The Andy Warhol Museum) and brother of Andy Warhol
