= Skin Fruit: Selections from the Dakis Joannou Collection =

In September, 2009 the New Museum announced a series of exhibitions titled "The Imaginary Museum", the first of which was curated by Jeff Koons from the collection of Dakis Joannou, who in addition to heavy collecting the work of Koons, is a trustee of the museum. The museum's decision to show works from the collection of one of its trustees raised some ethical red flags by several bloggers, and gained momentum with a front page article on The New York Times followed by considerable coverage elsewhere, including an editorial in The Art Newspaper by Modern Art Notes' Tyler Green, who had previously blogged about the situation, and responses by Jerry Saltz in New York Magazine. The cover of the November issue of the Brooklyn Rail featured a satirical cartoon by artist William Powhida with the title, "How the New Museum Committed Suicide with Banality", taken from a post by James Wagner, skewering the incestuousness and insiderness of the New Museum, and Artinfo called the controversy the "New Museum scandal". The New Museum responded in defense, and a number of other museum directors also defended the museum's decision.

In Roberta Smith's review of the show for The New York Times, she likened the selection of works to an auction display, and said, “Barely any intellectual glue holds the exhibition together.”
