= Ben Davis (art critic) =

American art critic

- Born: United States
- Education: Macalester College (BA)
- Occupations: Art critic, writer
- Notable work: 9.5 Theses on Art and Class (2013)

Ben A. Davis is an American art critic who writes about art and art theory from a Marxist perspective. His best-known work, 9.5 Theses on Art and Class, was published by Haymarket Books in 2013. His second book, Art in the After-Culture: Capitalist Crisis and Cultural Strategy, was published in 2022 and, like its predecessor, is a collection of Davis's cultural essays.

== Career ==
In 2001, Davis earned a BA from Macalester College. He was the college's first student to major in the newly created department of Humanities, Media and Cultural Studies (HMCS). His focus was critical theory. After graduating, he worked in a New York City bookstore. In 2004, he permanently settled in New York, "becoming an art critic full time after stints tutoring criminal justice students and writing about flower shows and poetry slams for a community newspaper in Queens." He resides in Brooklyn.

From 2005 to 2010, Davis was associate editor of Artnet Magazine. From 2010 to 2013, he was executive editor of the art news website Artinfo.com, where he had a column called "Interventions" about art and politics. In October 2014, Artnet News announced that it was appointing Davis as its National Art Critic, a position he continues to hold.

Davis's commentary on contemporary art has appeared in a wide range of publications including Adbusters, Art Papers, ArtReview, The Brooklyn Rail, Frieze, Jacobin, New York, Slate, and The Village Voice. He was co-editor of Elements of Architecture, the catalogue for the 2014 Venice Architecture Biennale, curated by Rem Koolhaas.

In 2011, The New Yorker art critic Peter Schjeldahl referred to Davis as "among the excellent younger critics now." In 2019, Harvard's Nieman Journalism Lab labeled him one of the five most influential art critics in the U.S.

== 9.5 Theses on Art and Class (Pamphlet) ==
In 2010, Davis wrote the pamphlet "9.5 Theses on Art and Class" for an art show titled #class at Winkleman Gallery in New York City. The show set out to explore how artistic success is determined by economics. Davis taped his pamphlet, Martin Luther-style, to the front window of the gallery. The discussion generated by the pamphlet drew notice in The New York Times, and was "one of the most talked about sessions" of the #class show, according to Sarah Thornton. The pamphlet contains a series of numbered proclamations, for example:

1.0 Class is an issue of fundamental importance for art.
2.0 Today, the ruling class, which is capitalist, dominates the sphere of the visual arts.
3.0 Though ruling-class ideology is ultimately dominant within the sphere of the arts, the predominant character of this sphere is middle class.
5.0 The idea of "art" has a basic and general human sense, on which no specific profession or class has a monopoly.
8.9 Creative expression needs to be redefined: It should not be thought of as a privilege, but as a basic human need. Because creative expression is a basic human need, it should be treated as a right to which everyone is entitled.

"9.5 Theses on Art and Class" was later translated into several languages.

== 9.5 Theses on Art and Class (Book) ==
Davis collected a group of his essays in the Haymarket-published book, 9.5 Theses on Art and Class (2013), which incorporated the text of his pamphlet as Chapter 2. Upon its publication, 9.5 Theses on Art and Class received positive notice in both the mainstream and art press. New York magazine called it "a riveting manifesto". The Stranger ended its review by stating, "We should hold town hall meetings on this book." Although The Village Voice review faulted Davis for "too readily" using Marxism as an explanatory model, the review placed him in an honorable tradition of pamphleteers, and concluded by stating, "On 9.5 Theses, the verdict is crystal: This is one helluva pamphlet."

In a September 2013 review in the socialist magazine Jacobin, Rachel Wetzler wrote that Davis's arguments "too often take the form of smug, self-righteous dismissals that convey only his disapproval rather than making a case for why the reader should agree." She said of the author: "His palpable disdain for the [art] academy tends to result in lazy caricatures, providing an impression of art historians and critics as an overeducated lot desperately struggling to return a sense of radical urgency to semiotics and leftist academics as armchair revolutionaries unwilling to get their hands dirty." Later that year, Jacobin published Davis's rebuttal to the Wetzler review.

In a list of the "10 Best Art Books of 2013", art critic Hrag Vartanian gave 9.5 Theses on Art and Class an Honorable Mention, crediting Davis with "[bringing] the discussion of class, artists, and the art market center stage in a way that [goes] beyond fleeting auction reports and perpetual gallery gripes." The book was nominated for Best Work of Criticism by the International Association of Art Critics.

== Art in the After-Culture: Capitalist Crisis and Cultural Strategy (Book) ==
Davis published a new set of essays in the collection, Art in the After-Culture: Capitalist Crisis and Cultural Strategy (2022). Holland Cotter, Chief Art Critic at The New York Times, included it on his "Best Art Books of 2022" list, saying: "When future art historians seek perspectives on our era of billion dollar auctions, carbon-footprint art fairs, and market driven diversity, this collection of essays by the American critic Ben Davis is a text they'll consult.... He writes with the coolness of a sociologist, the passion of someone with a horse in the race and the smarts to avoid both cheerleading and snootiness." Lisa Hilton of The Times Literary Supplement also put Art in the After-Culture on her 2022 list of best books, praising the writing as "... glistening, passionate yet coolly precise.... Brilliant, revelatory, urgent."
