= Carrie Moyer =

American painter (born 1960)

- Born: 1960 (age 65–66); Detroit, Michigan
- Education: Pratt Institute; New York Institute of Technology; Bard College
- Known for: Painting, writing
- Notable work: Dyke Action Machine
- Spouse: Sheila Pepe
- Awards: Joan Mitchell Painters and Sculptors Grant, Anonymous Was a Woman Award, Creative Capital Foundation Grant
- Website: http://www.carriemoyer.com

Carrie Moyer (born 1960) is an American painter and writer living in Brooklyn, New York. Moyer's paintings and public art projects have been exhibited both in the US and Europe since the early 1990s, and she is best known for her 17-year agitprop project, Dyke Action Machine! with photographer Sue Schaffner. Moyer's work has been shown at the Whitney Biennial, the Museum of Arts and Design, and the Tang Museum, and is held in the permanent collections of the Metropolitan Museum of Art. She serves as the director of the graduate MFA program at Hunter College, and has contributed writing to anthologies and publications like The Brooklyn Rail and Artforum.

== Early life and education ==
Carrie Moyer was born in Detroit, Michigan in 1960. She was exposed to art at an early age and frequently visited the Detroit Institute of Arts with her mother. In 1969, her family moved to the Pacific Northwest and lived in Oregon, California, and Washington throughout the 1970s. Moyer became interested in modern dance and choreographers such as Martha Graham as a child and briefly attended Bennington College on a dance scholarship until a serious car accident forced her to quit. After one year at Bennington, she dropped out and moved to New York City with her girlfriend, and took classes at the Art Students League while working at Barnes & Noble.

Moyer transferred to Pratt Institute and graduated with her BFA in painting in 1985. While at Pratt, Moyer studied under artists Rudolf Baranik, Amy and Jenny Snider, Phoebe Helman, Jack Sonnenberg, and Ernest Benkert. She largely produced abstract paintings during this time, and was inspired by painters such as Lee Krasner, Bill Jensen, Elizabeth Murray, and Katherine Porter. She also worked as an intern for Heresies: A Feminist Publication on Art and Politics as an undergraduate.

In 1990, she received her MA in Computer Graphics from the New York Institute of Technology and an MFA from the Milton Avery Graduate School of the Arts at Bard College in 2001. She also studied at the Skowhegan School of Painting and Sculpture in 1995.

== Career ==
=== Graphic design ===
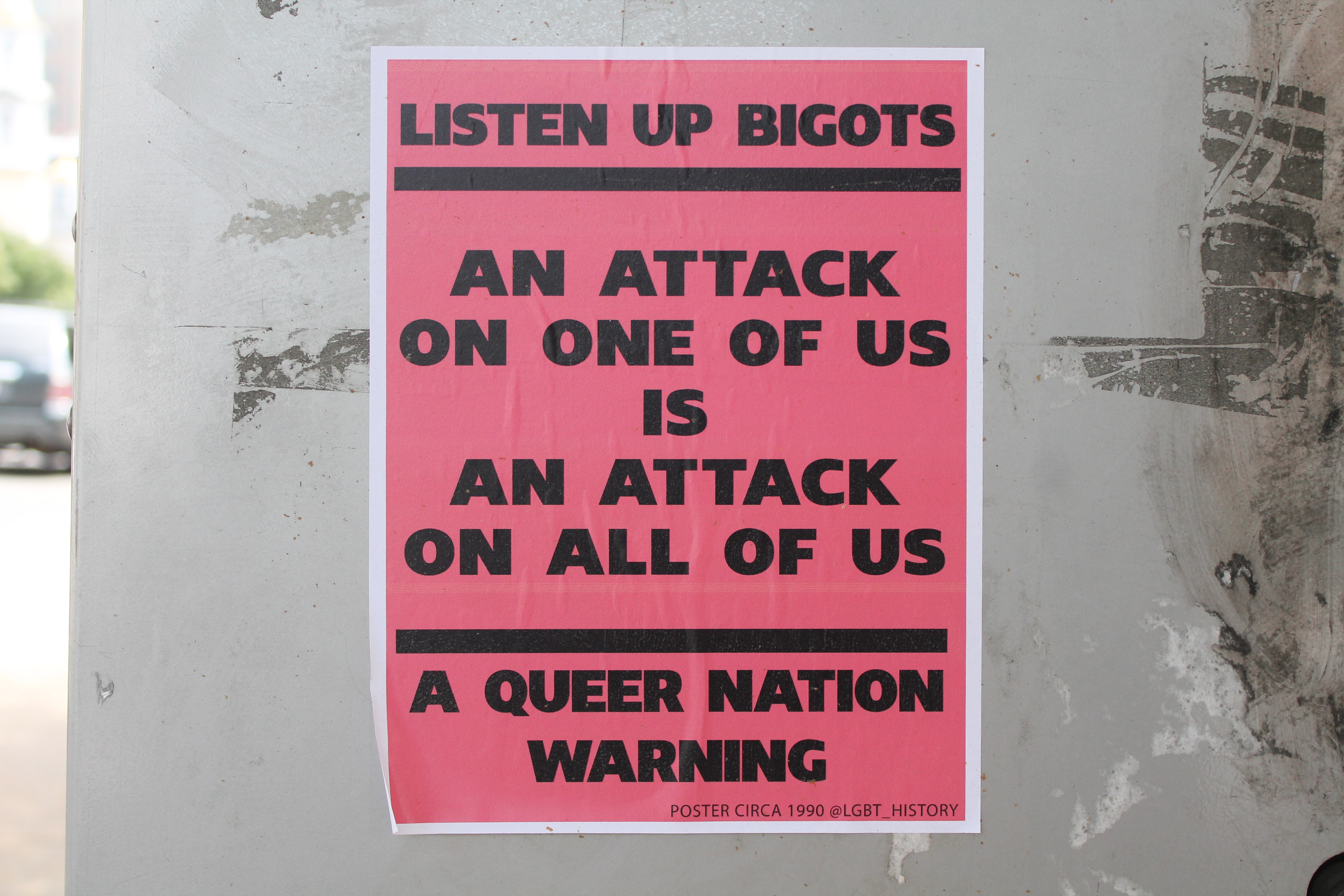
Example of agitprop posters by Queer Nation, located in Lafayette Square, Washington, D.C. in 2018.

After graduating from Pratt in 1985, Moyer worked as a graphic designer for various advertising agencies, where she first developed skills with computer graphic software like Photoshop. At the same time, she became more involved with lesbian and gay rights movements in New York after learning about ACT UP and Gran Fury through Avram Finkelstein, and began to apply her graphic design skills to her activism. Moyer began creating agitprop in the early 1990s, studying historical movements like Constructivism and Situationism and artists like Ad Reinhardt. Throughout the 1990s, she created posters, pamphlets, and graphics for various lesbian and gay activist groups in New York City, including Queer Nation, the Lesbian Avengers, the Irish Lesbian and Gay Organization, and the New York City Anti-Violence Project. After discovering the Lesbian Avengers at the New York City Gay Pride March in 1992, Moyer designed the logo for the group. The logo would be the subject of controversy almost 30 years later in 2021, when Gap used the logo on a t-shirt after purchasing the design from Moyer for $7,000, which she donated to the Lesbian Herstory Archives. Some founding members of the Lesbian Avengers, such as Sarah Schulman, criticized the commodification of the movement, and the shirt was ultimately discontinued.

=== Dyke Action Machine! ===
In 1991, Moyer and photographer Sue Schaffner founded Dyke Action Machine! (DAM!), a queer interventionist public art project informed by Appropriationist artists like Barbara Kruger, Jenny Holzer, and Sherrie Levine. It began as a working group of the activist organization, Queer Nation, which Moyer felt neglected lesbian issues, and evolved into a stand-alone agitprop duo. DAM! would launch artistic campaigns in which Moyer and Schaffner would wheat-paste roughly 5,000 posters featuring lesbian imagery in diverse, highly trafficked neighborhoods, with the goal of dissecting and critiquing mainstream and commercial culture. They frequently repackaged popular and recognizable logos, designs, and slogans to package a lesbian aesthetic, and in using public advertising space to subvert heterosexual norms, created what Jayne Caudwell refers to as a "micro dykescape". In 1994, DAM! began focusing on digital techniques and mediums to avoid commodification and assimilation, using domains like Dyke TV and Girlie Network to create interactive narratives and artwork. Moyer and Schaffner produced over 15 projects during their collaboration as DAM!, which came to an end in 2008 after 17 years.

=== Painting and teaching ===
Moyer returned to painting in the early 1990s, and continued to explore themes of lesbian identity and sexuality in her work. Her work as a graphic designer continued to influence her painting, and she explored abstraction by adding tactile and spatial effects to her paintings, notably glitter beginning in the late 1990s.

In 2003, CANADA Gallery in New York City began representing Moyer and frequently exhibited her work in solo and group shows. In 2015, she left the gallery to be represented by DC Moore Gallery. In 2004, her abstract paintings were shown alongside Sheila Pepe's sculptures at the Palm Beach Institute of Contemporary Art; in 2020, the couple would again be the subject of a two-person exhibition, "Tabernacles for Trying Times," organized at the Portland Museum of Art in Maine and later traveling to the Museum of Arts and Design in New York.

In 2004, her work appeared in a group exhibition at Aljira: A Center for Contemporary Art alongside Ellen Harvey, Chris Bors, and Richard Silberman.

Moyer has taught at the Cooper Union, Rhode Island School of Design, Rutgers University, Tyler School of Art, Pratt Institute, and Yale School of Art. In 2011, Moyer joined the studio faculty of Hunter College, and became the co-director of its MFA program in 2021 alongside Lisa Corinne Davis. In 2011 and 2013, she received a MacDowell Fellowship. In 2013, Moyer received a Guggenheim Fellowship in painting, which allowed her to complete the work for a solo exhibition, "Pirate Jenny", which was shown at the Tang Museum, Columbus College of Art and Design, and Savannah College of Art and Design. A piece from the show is also held in the permanent collection of the Metropolitan Museum of Art. She has also had a solo exhibition, "Interstellar," at the Worcester Art Museum in 2012, and exhibited at MoMA PS1, Weatherspoon Art Museum, Cooper-Hewitt National Design Museum, and Project Art Space in Dublin.

Moyer's work was included in the 2017 Whitney Biennial, and described as a "standout" by The New Yorker. In October 2019, Moyer was elected as a full member of the National Academy of Design.

=== Writing ===
Moyer's writing has appeared in Art in America, Artforum, Modern Painters, the Brooklyn Rail and other publications. Since 1997, her essays have also been included in a range of anthologies – from Queers in Space: Communities, Public Spaces and Sites of Resistance (Bay Press, 1997) to The Studio Reader: On the Space of Artists (Michelle Grabner and Mary Jane Jacobs, editors; University of Chicago Press, 2010). She also contributed to Sharon Louden's The Artist as Culture Producer: Living and Sustaining a Creative Life.

== Work ==
Pirate Jenny (2012) at the Metropolitan Museum of Art in 2022

For the past two decades, Moyer's paintings have merged abstract aesthetics and political imagery. Complex and seductive paintings layer vividly colored and textured biomorphic forms with a range of historical, stylistic and physical references that include Color Field, Social Realist, and Surrealist paintings, 1960s and ’70s counter culture graphics, 1970s feminist art, and bodily forms and fluids. Moyer often works on the floor, pouring, rolling, stippling, mopping, and hand-working the paint, as well as adding sections of glitter.

Critic Martha Schwendener has written about Moyer's paintings:

"Painting is a neurotically self-conscious medium—it's always looking over its shoulder, responding to earlier eras and earlier ideas. Carrie Moyer puts that self-consciousness at the center of her work. But where mash-ups of different periods and styles have become popular with post-postmodern painters (and often end up looking like conceptual train wrecks), her canvases are cool, seamless—almost alchemical."

By juxtaposing the ancient, modern, and contemporary, Moyer rips images out of their old contexts and circulates them in a new one—"cross-wiring," she calls it. Slipping between abstract and representational, the raw canvases are built up with strata of translucent and opaque color, positive and negative shapes, and solids and silhouettes that reference different historical periods: ancient fertility figures with bulging hips; vases with breasts circling their perimeters; murky blobs that recall the paintings of biomorphic Surrealism. These juxtapositions make a commentary on an unsettling subtext here, a suggestion of the way women have served as talismanic muse-objects in past art instead of intelligent innovators.

== Personal life ==
In 1995, Moyer met artist Sheila Pepe at the Skowhegan School of Painting and Sculpture. They began dating in 1998 and were married in 2015.

Since 2018, she has worked out of a studio in the Brooklyn Army Terminal in Sunset Park.

== Awards ==
- 1999: Elaine de Kooning Memorial Fellowship
- 1999: Peter Norton Family Foundation Project Grant
- 2000: Creative Capital Award
- 2009: Joan Mitchell Foundation Painters and Sculptors Grant
- 2009: Anonymous Was A Woman Award
- 2011: Yaddo Residency
- 2011 and 2013: MacDowell Fellowship
- 2013: Guggenheim Fellowship

== Selected writings ==
- "Carrie Moyer." Grabner, Michelle and Mary Jane Jacobs, eds. The Studio Reader: On the Space of Artists. Chicago. University of Chicago Press, 2010
- Moyer, Carrie. "So Appealing, So Different: Carrie Moyer on the Women of Pop," Artforum, April 2010
- Moyer, Carrie. "Alina Szapocznikow: My American Dream," The Brooklyn Rail, October 2010
- Moyer, Carrie. "Maria Lassnig: The Pitiless Eye," Art in America, January 2009
- Moyer, Carrie. "Dona Nelson: Brain Stain," The Brooklyn Rail, October 2006
