= How the New Museum Committed Suicide with Banality =

How The New Museum Committed Suicide With Banality
- Artist: William Powhida
- Year: 2009
- Type: graphite on paper

How The New Museum Committed Suicide With Banality is a 2009 drawing on paper by William Powhida that the Brooklyn Rail commissioned for the cover of its November 2009 issue. The drawing was released in an edition of 20 prints sold by two galleries that represent Powhida, Schroeder Romero in New York and Charlie James Gallery in Los Angeles.

The name of the drawing was taken from a post on Artcat publisher James Wagner's blog. The work features caricatures of individuals involved in the controversial New Museum exhibition, including Jeff Koons as Howdy Doody, which Edward Winkleman remarked is ironic considering how much Powhida's work owes to Koons. New Museum trustee at the center of the controversy, Dakis Joannou, bought a print of Powhida's drawing from his New York dealer for $1,500.

In New York Magazine art critic Jerry Saltz's assessment of 2009, he praised the work for its critique of conflicts of interest in the art world. Saltz emphasized Powhida's role as a social observer, comparing his work to Honoré Daumier.

Powhida later responded to criticism in an article published on the Art:21 blog.

== Howdy Koonsy ==
The Koons caricature picks up on a resemblance between the artist and the freckled-faced Howdy Doody suggested in 2008 by Rhonda Leiberman in her coverage of New York Times Arts and Leisure Week for Artforum. The resemblance has also been noted by Charlie Finch in Artnet Magazine and Regina Hackett in the Seattle Post-Intelligencer. The popularity of Howdy Koonsy prompted the Brooklyn Rail to produce a limited edition run of t-shirts featuring the caricature.
