= Hashtag Class =

#class at Winkleman Gallery

#class was a month-long series of events at Winkleman Gallery in New York that took place between February 20 to March 20, 2010 organized by artists William Powhida and Jennifer Dalton. The exhibition combined social media and networking with a physical gallery space.

Edward Winkleman, owner of Winkleman Gallery, suggested in an interview with art critic Brian Sherwin for FineArtViews that #class would have failed to have the same impact if the events had been displayed exclusively online. Winkleman implied that the meshing between online social media and a brick & mortar gallery space conveyed the "real intent" of the artists’ behind #class.

The #class exhibition coincided with the opening of a controversial exhibition at the New Museum showcasing artwork owned by longtime trustee Dakis Joannou, a prolific collector of works by artists like Kiki Smith, Kara Walker and Jeff Koons. Jen Dalton described the show as “a sort of a think tank or classroom. We want to facilitate a conversation about where the art world is and class in the art world.”

#class invited guest artists, critics, academics, dealers, collectors and anyone else who would like to participate to examine the way art is made and seen in our culture and to identify and propose alternatives and/or reforms to the current market system. The name "#class" was taken from the practice on Twitter of placing a "#" known as a hash tag to mark a tweet as part of a discussion. The name of the exhibition references the social media phenomenon that has been called crowdsourcing.

== Events ==
Drawing by William Powhida and Jennifer Dalton for #class exhibition

Man Bartlett's performance/installation 24h #class action

- El Celso performed an "Art Shred"
- Hrag Vartanian of the blogazine Hyperallegic invited visitors to reveal who owes them money in an event called "$ecrets of the New York Art World."
- Mira Schor, artist and author of the book A Decade of Negative Thinking: Essays on Art, Politics, and Daily Life delivered a lecture "On Failure and Anonymity"
- "Investigating Personal Obstacles to Creativity" performance by Lisa Levy
- WNYC art critic and CMonstah blogger Carolina Miranda lead visitors in "Art Yoga"
- Q & A with Postmasters Gallery dealer Magda Sawon
- new media duo Jennifer & Kevin McCoy offered a "Collector Focus Group"
- Artist Yevgeniy Fiks held a lecture/presentation entitled, "Communist Modern Artist and the Market," showing how many of the most highly valued art of the 20th century were produced by artists who considered themselves communists (Picasso, Leger, Kahlo, Rivera and more).
- Artist Man Bartlett staged "24h #class action" in which he and others blew up balloons for 24 hours and then popped them all. These were long skinny balloons that would never turn into cute little Jeff Koons balloon dogs.

The exhibition concluded on March 20 with "Rant Night" in which everyone was encouraged to come and let it rip on whatever was still bothering them.

The artists produced work during the exhibition that responded to the information, events and discussions that took place. The work was not priced in the usual commercial manner, premised on 'what the market will bear' based on their past work and reputations. Instead, the artists offered suggested guidelines for appropriate prices, such as one day of the buyer's income from his or her job, 0.1% of his or her net worth, etc.
