= Karlheinz Essl Jr. =

Austrian composer (born 1960)

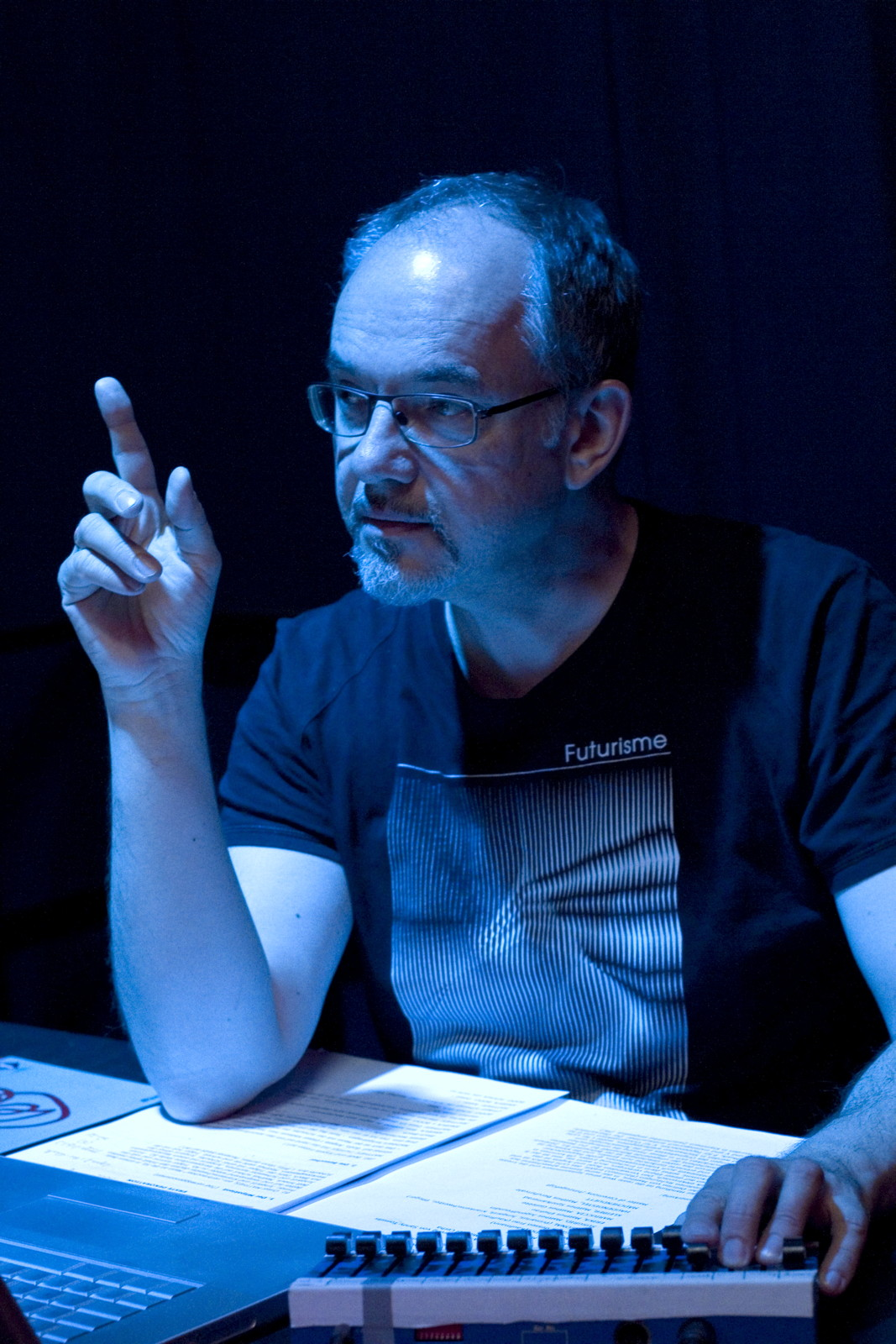
- Essl Jr. in 2011 (photo by Reinhard Mayr)
- Born: 15 August 1960 (age 66); Vienna, Austria
- Education: University of Music Vienna, University of Vienna
- Occupation: composer • sound artist • electronic performer • music curator • composition professor
- Years active: 1980–present
- Known for: Algorithmic composition, generative music, sound installations, software for real-time composition
- Awards: Lower Austria Cultural Awards – Award of Recognition for Music; 2004
- Website: essl.at

Karlheinz Essl Jr. (born 15 August 1960) is an Austrian composer, sound artist, electronic performer, music curator, and composition professor. He is the eldest son of Karlheinz Essl Sr., an entrepreneur and art collector.

== Biography ==
Essl was born in Vienna. His studies at the University of Music in Vienna included composition under Friedrich Cerha, electroacoustic music under Dieter Kaufmann, and double bass. At the University of Vienna he studied musicology and wrote his doctoral thesis on Das Synthese-Denken bei Anton Webern, 'Anton Webern's Synthetic Thinking' (1989). Essl's formative years were marked by an early exposure to classical music theory, as well as an academic engagement with serialism and modern music technologies. His interest in blending traditional musical practices with new technologies led him to the field of electronic music, where he would develop a reputation for innovation and experimentation.

From 1992 to 2016, he was the music curator of the Sammlung Essl in Klosterneuburg, near Vienna. Between 1995 and 2006, he taught algorithmic composition at the Studio for Advanced Music & Media Technology for the Anton Bruckner Private University for Music, Drama, and Dance in Linz, Austria. From 2007 to 2025, Essl was professor of composition for electroacoustic and experimental music at the University of Music and Performing Arts, Vienna.

== Music ==
Essl's work with computers (with emphases on algorithmic composition and generative music) and prolonged occupation with the poetics of serial music have been formative influences on his compositional thinking. Besides writing instrumental music, Essl also works in the field of electronic music, creating interactive realtime compositions and sound installations.

Since the early 1990s, he has developed various software environments for realtime composition, which he uses for his own live performances and also in collaboration with artists from other fields, including choreographers, dancers, visual artists, and poets. Essl has also carried out a number of internet-based projects and became increasingly involved with improvisation.

Essl began developing a computer-based electronic instrument called m@ze°2 in 1998. He has used it to improvise during live performances. Since 2008, he is working on Sequitur, a series of compositions for various solo instruments and live electronics. In 2022, Essl began exploring analogue modular synthesizers as an alternative to computers and digital tools.

== Reception ==
While working on commission at IRCAM in Paris (1992–1993), he was composer-in-residence at the Darmstädter Ferienkurse für Neue Musik (1990–1994). In 1997, Essl was featured at the Salzburg Festival with portrait concerts and sound installations. In 2003, he was artist-in-residence of the festival musik aktuell, and in 2004 he was presented with a series of portrait concerts at the Brucknerhaus. He was the 2008–2009 composer-in-residence of the Belgium ensemble Champ d'Action.

=== Algorithmic composition and generative music ===
Essl has been a pioneer in the use of algorithmic composition and generative music. These approaches involve the use of algorithms, computer programs, or systems to generate musical structures, often in real-time, creating music that evolves according to predefined rules or randomly determined processes. Essl's work in this area has greatly influenced contemporary trends in algorithmic composition, and he often integrates these processes into his live performances.

=== Interactive real-time compositions and sound installations ===
In addition to composing instrumental and electronic music, Essl is known for creating interactive real-time compositions and sound installations. His works in this domain often involve the audience or environment in real-time, influencing the composition or sound output during the performance or installation. These works explore the intersection of sound, technology, and human interaction, allowing for a more immersive and dynamic experience.

=== Development of software for real-time composition ===
Since the early 1990s, Essl has developed a variety of software environments for real-time composition, which he uses in both his live performances and collaborations with artists from diverse fields. These software tools allow Essl to create music interactively, often in collaboration with dancers, choreographers, visual artists, and poets. His technical contributions have been instrumental in advancing live electronic music and expanding the possibilities of interactive composition.

=== m@ze°2 and Sequitur ===
Essl began developing a computer-based electronic instrument called m@ze°2 in 1998. This instrument, which he uses for improvisation, has become an integral part of his live performances, allowing for spontaneous creation and manipulation of sound in real time.

In 2008, Essl began work on the Sequitur project, a series of compositions for various solo instruments combined with live electronics. These compositions have been central to his recent output and showcase his continued interest in the relationship between acoustic instruments and live electronic processing.

=== Recent works and collaborations ===
In recent years, Essl has written several solo and ensemble pieces for electric guitar, reflecting his ongoing interest in blending acoustic and electronic elements. His works often involve complex interactions between musicians and technology, emphasizing the role of improvisation and spontaneity.

Essl has also collaborated with various artists across disciplines, including choreographers, dancers, and visual artists, often creating interdisciplinary performances that merge music, dance, and visual art.

=== Influence and legacy ===
Essl's work has been a significant influence on the development of contemporary electronic music, especially in the fields of algorithmic composition, generative music, and interactive sound installations. His innovative approach to music technology and his contributions to real-time composition software have made him an important figure in the avant-garde music scene.

== Selected works ==
- Helix 1.0 for string quartet (1986)
- met him pike trousers for large orchestra (1987)
- Rudiments for 4 snare drums (1989)
- Close the Gap for 3 tenor saxophones (1989)
- …et consumimur igni for 3 ensemble groups (1990)
- In's Offene! for flute, bass clarinet, violin and cello (1991)
- Entsagung for ensemble and electronics (1993)
- Lexikon-Sonate infinite realtime composition for computer-controlled piano (1992–2007)
- Déviation for ensemble (1993)
- absence for violin solo (1996)
- à trois/seul for string trio (1998)
- mise en scène for 10 instruments (1998)
- more or less realtime composition for soloists and electronics (1999–2002)
- upward, behind the onstreaming it mooned for string quartet (2001)
- blur for flute, cello and vibraphone (2003)
- Faites vos jeux! a musical card game for cellos and/or trombones (2004)
- Kalimba for toy piano and playback (2005)
- colorado for saxophone quartet and live-electronics (2005–2008)
- Von Hirschen und Röhren sound installation for Beat Zoderer (2006–2007)
- 7x7 for 4 clarinets, 4 saxophones, 4 trombones or 4 electric guitars (2006–2009)
- AIRBORNE open-air sound environment (2006)
- Cinq for woodwind quintet (2007)
- FRÄULEIN ATLANTIS generative sound and video environment for Jonathan Meese (2007)
- Sequitur cycle for 14 different solo instruments and live-electronics (2008/2009)
- while my guitars gently whip for 4 electric guitars (2008/2009)
- Detune for oboe and large orchestra (2009)
- Chemi(s)e for electric guitar and 2 ensemble groups (2009)
- whatever shall be for toy piano, dreidel, music box and live-electronics (2010)
- LABoratorio mixed-media performance for viola, percussions, live-electronics, dancers and video (2010/2011)
- juncTions for grand piano (two players) and live-electronics (2011/2012)
- Si! for tenor tuba (or trombone), live-electronics and surround sound (2012)
- under wood for two amplified toy pianos (one player) and ensemble (2012)
- Miles to go for 4 prepared and amplified toy pianos (2012)
- STERN for electric violin and vibration speaker (2013)
- VIRIBVS VNITIS for toy piano and harpsichord (2014)
- RESONAVIT for zither, electric violin and vibration speaker (2014)
- Omnia in omnibus sound/video/performance for the 650th anniversary of the University of Vienna (2014)
- Autumn's leaving for pipa and live-electronics (2015)
- imagination soundtrack for a paper theater piece (2015)
- river_run for guzheng and live-electronics (2016)
- exit*glue for trombone and electric guitar (2016)

See also the "Werkverzeichnis" [work catalogue]. MUSIC Information Center AUSTRIA (in German).

== Software ==
- Amazing Maze: interactive realtime composition for sampled sound particles (CC BY-NC-ND 2.5)
- Lexikon-Sonate: algorithmic music generator (CC BY-NC-ND 3.0)
- fLOW: ambient soundscape generator (Shareware)
- REplay PLAYer: generative sound file shredder (Shareware)
- SEELEWASCHEN: ambient sound environment based on the sound of a bell (CC BY-NC-ND 2.5)
- FontanaMixer: generative sound environment based on John Cage's Fontana Mix (CC BY-NC-ND 2.5)
- WebernUhrWerk: generative music generator in memory of Anton Webern (CC BY-NC-ND 2.5)

== Records ==
- ORGANO/LOGICS: Wolfgang Kogert plays Karlheinz Essl's organ music (col legno 2023)
- Gold.Berg.Werk: a radical re-interpretation of J.S. Bach's Goldberg Variations for piano and electronics, performed by Xenia Pestova-Bennett and Ed Bennett (Ergodos 2008)
- ruderals: free improvisations for zither and electronics, with Martin Mallaun (Nachtstück Records 2014)
- WAGNERIANA: Three Deconstructions on Richard Wagner (Radical Matters 2013)
- whatever shall be: music for toy instruments and electronics, performed by Isabel Ettenauer (Edition Eirelav 2013)
- Gold.Berg.Werk: interpretation of J.S. Bach's Goldberg Variations for string trio and electronics (Preiser Records 2008)
- SNDTX: electronic music #3 (tlhotra #23 2008) - free download from archive.org
- ©RUDE: electronic music #2 (Lotus Records 2001)
- m@ze°2: electronic music #1 (KHE 1999) - free download as mp3 from last.fm
- Rudiments: instrumental compositions 1986–1993 (TONOS 1995)

== See also ==
- Algorithmic composition
- Generative music
- Interactive music
- List of Austrians in music
- Live electronics
- Serialism
