= Die Humpty-Dumpty-Maschine der totalen Zukunft =

Sculpture in Berlin, Germany

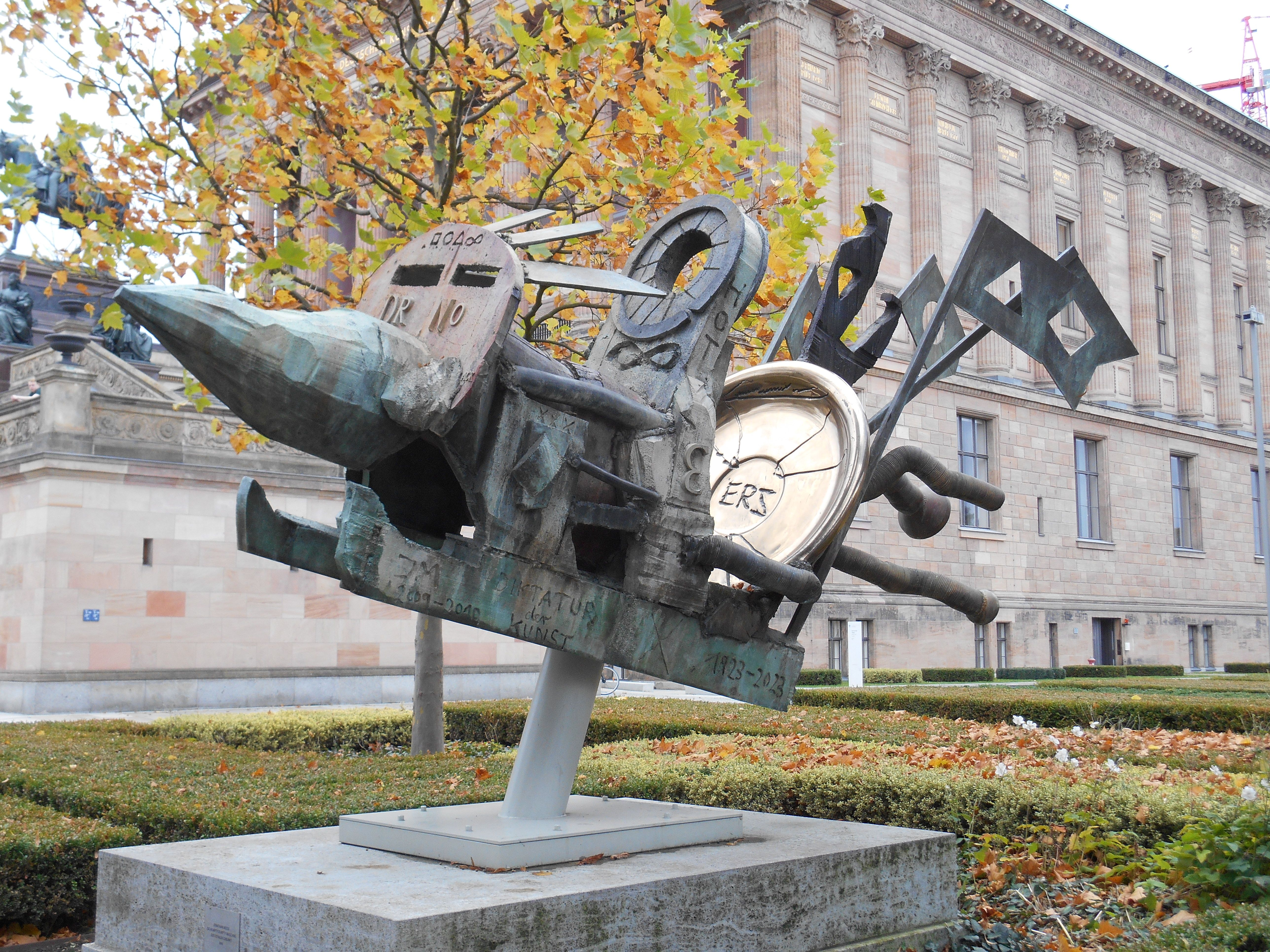
- The sculpture in 2013
- Artist: Jonathan Meese
- Year: 2010
- Medium: Bronze sculpture
- Location: Berlin, Germany

Die Humpty-Dumpty-Maschine der totalen Zukunft (The Humpty-Dumpty machine of the total future) is a bronze sculpture created 2010 by Jonathan Meese, and installed at the Alte Nationalgalerie in Berlin, Germany, during 2011–2015.

== Creation ==
The original concept was "animal with naked woman"; the animal became a machine and the human disappeared. The work of art was first created as a geometric sketch from which a small model was developed. The next step was a large polystyrene model, which was then "ore-machined". The sculpture was cast in the Hermann Noack art foundry. The employees of the bronze foundry were involved in this step to guarantee a stable basic structure on which the details could be built. The final processing of the surfaces including mechanical and chemical treatment was also carried out by the Noack specialists.

According to the artist, models for his work of art were: the Nautilus, Emma the steam locomotive, Lok 1414, Chitty Chitty Bang Bang, vehicles from Mad Max films, Ben Hur's chariot, the Snow Queen's sleigh, the Sandman's vehicle and the time machine. Meese characterizes his bronze object as forward-looking: "The baby spaceship flies forward only, without a rear-view mirror, without a railing and without nostalgia, great, great, great."

== Reception ==
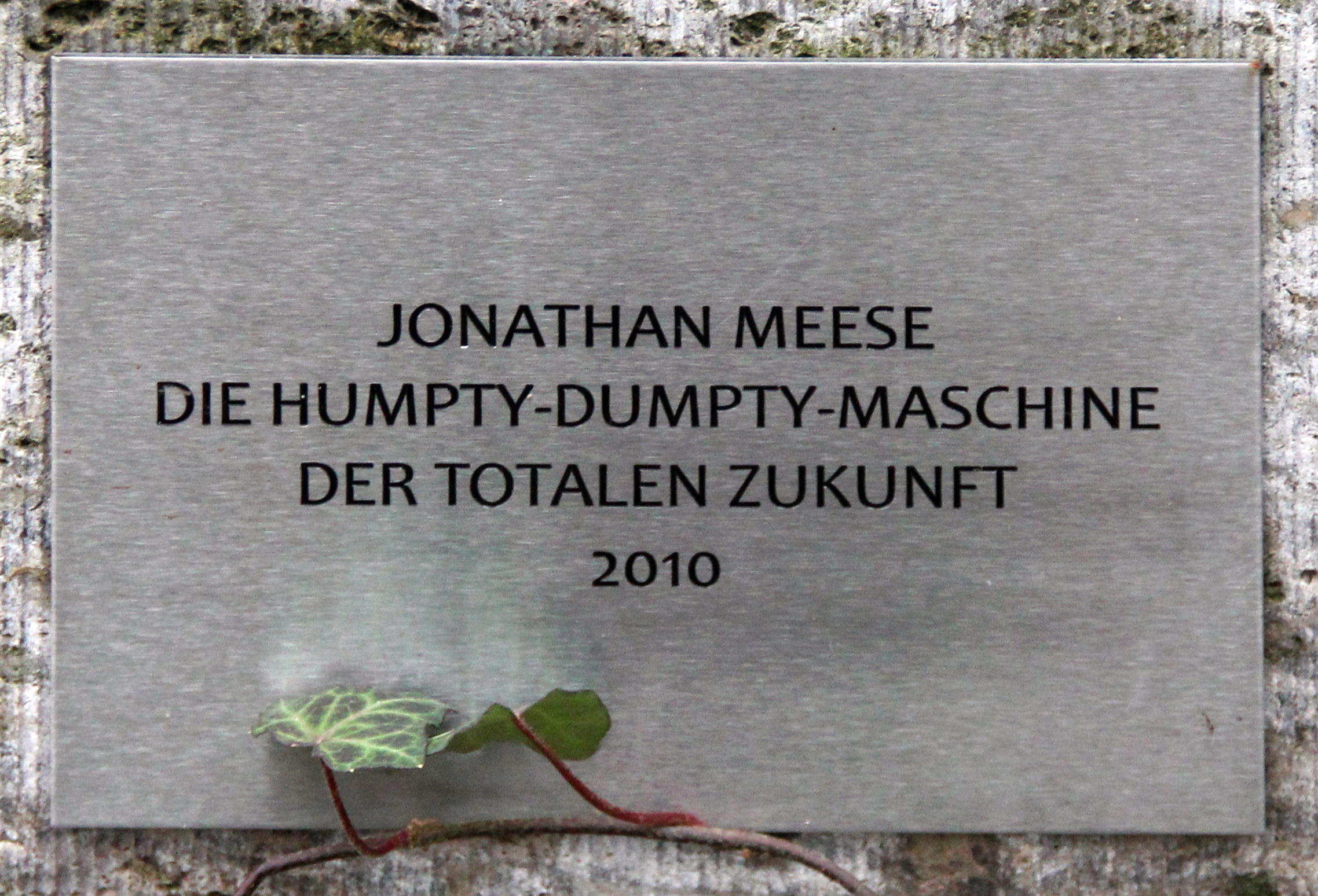
Plaque for the sculpture, 2013

Gallery owner Philipp Haverkampf said that the work is a crazy mixture of time machine, spaceship and the sled of the sandman. When you look at it, you can see bizarre details such as geometric shapes, the Iron Cross and a beer bottle.

According to Der Tagesspiegel, the term 'Humpty Dumpty' in the title refers to the talking egg in Lewis Carroll's children's book Through the Looking-Glass, and What Alice Found There. In the Colonnades Courtyard in front of the Alte Nationalgalerie, the motley flying machine made of pieces as found at flea markets seems like a foreign body between the well-proportioned statues of classical sculpture schools.

Meese's sculpture is part of the educational canon of 100 works in the categories of film/video, music, literature, architecture, and art which the editorial team of Die Zeit compiled from readers' letters in the fall of 2018.

== See also ==
- 2010 in art
