= Tim Berresheim =

German visual artist (born 1975)

Tim Berresheim (born 1975, Heinsberg, Germany) is a contemporary German visual artist who lives and works in Cologne. He studied at the Hochschule der Bildenden Künste in Braunschweig from 1998 to 2000 and the Kunstakademie in Düsseldorf in 2000. He studied under the director, actor, and screenwriter Burkhard Driest and the German artist Albert Oehlen.

Besides making visual art, Berresheim also makes music with fellow established contemporary German artist, Jonathan Meese.
