= Center for Artistic Activism =

Arts organization

The Center for Artistic Activism is a non-profit organization co-founded in 2009 by Stephen Duncombe and Steve Lambert. The Center defines "artistic activism" as “a dynamic practice combining the creative power of the arts to move us emotionally with the strategic planning of activism necessary to bring about social change.”

The Center has a training program focused on combining art and activism that has mentored over 1500 artists and grant makers as of 2021. Additionally the center advises organizations to utilize creativity and culture to enhance advocacy towards social and environmental change. In collaboration with the Smithsonian Institution's Anacostia Community Museum, the center organized The Utopia Project exhibition. Some of the projects sponsored by the center include helping to obtain healthcare for LGBTQ individuals in Eastern Europe, and working with artists and activists to fight corruption in West Africa.

Publications by the center include The Art of Activism: Your All-purpose Guide to Making the Impossible Possible (2021) ISBN 9781682192696.
