= Charlie James Gallery =

Contemporary art gallery in Los Angeles, California

Coordinates: 34.066549°N 118.238250°W

Charlie James Gallery is a contemporary art gallery located in the Chinatown neighborhood of Los Angeles.

The gallery’s focus leans toward political work that in some way questions or comments on issues of contemporary cultural significance. The gallery has invested in culture jammers of international reputation like Steve Lambert, art world provocateurs like William Powhida, and mid-career conceptual artists like Ray Beldner and Walter Robinson. The gallery also cares about work that addresses issues of contemporary identity, exhibiting Iranian-American artists Ala Ebtekar and Taravat Talepasand and feminist artist Orly Cogan.

== History ==
Founded in 2008 in Seattle, Washington, the gallery moved to Los Angeles in November of that year, apparently undeterred by the 2008 financial crisis.

The gallery is steered by two parties: Charlie James, collector and ex-Microsoft senior manager and Dane Johnson, San Francisco Art Institute graduate and working artist. In Michelle Levy's ArtSlant report on Pulse NY 2010, she described William Powhida's and Jade Townsend's drawing ABMB Hooverville, which was revealed at Charlie James booth, as a "narrative tour-de-force".

== Represented Artists ==
Steve Lambert, Ala Ebtekar, Nery Gabriel Lemus, Lars Jan, Lucas Murgida, William Powhida, Daniela Comani, Ramiro Gomez, Eske Kath, Richard Kraft, Michelle Andrade and Andrew Lewicki.
