= Dyke Action Machine! =

Public art and activism duo

Dyke Action Machine! or DAM! is a public art and activist duo made up of painter and graphic designer Carrie Moyer and photographer Sue Schaffner. DAM! gained notoriety in the 1990s for using commercial photography styling with lesbian imagery in public art.

== History ==
Sue Schaffner and Carrie Moyer formed Dyke Action Machine! (DAM!) in 1991 in New York City. They met when in 1990 working together in Queer Nation, splitting from the group in 1991 because they saw a need for lesbian representation in particular. DAM!'s name was chosen to signal "that lesbians had their own particular set of oppressions and social conditions – separate from gay men – that needed attending to." DAM! specifically targeted lesbophobia: the marginalization of lesbians not only in favor of heterosexuality but also within LGBTQ+ circles, where Schaffner and Moyer saw the male homosexual as privileged.

The duo created radical feminist public art, putting images of lesbians into commercialized styles and settings. Between 1991 and 2005, DAM! worked from January to June to create pieces for Pride Week. Together with groups like Guerilla Girls and Toxic Titties, DAM! resisted sexism and consumerism. DAM! has been described as intentionally pluralistic, embracing many identities and issues.

With Schaffner's experience as a commercial photographer and Moyer's work as a designer and painter, the duo captured and created images reminiscent of commercial advertising but delivered messages that raised the profile of lesbians. Much of DAM!'s work were spoofs on popular advertisements using models that were easily-identifiable as lesbians as the main subject in their reverse marketing strategy. DAM! created posters, postcards, matchbooks, and a website displaying their work. This material was then placed where ads were typically seen, such as bus stops, telephone booths, and construction site barricades. Giving out the artwork for free was important to DAM!'s message because, as Schaffner described, "lesbians don't have that much stuff that's specifically for them."

DAM!'s method of presenting lesbian activist art in typically commercial landscapes creates an effect described by some as agitprop. Schaffner and Moyer remained anonymous for eight years, only signing their work as Dyke Action Machine! Among their influences for their work were Gran Fury, Barbara Kruger, and Fran Winant. The duo is mainly active in the New York City area, although their work has been shown internationally and they make some available to be downloaded and distributed by anyone.

The work of Dyke Action Machine! is held at the Cooper-Hewitt National Design Museum. It has been included in anthologies and encyclopedias of queer and lesbian art, where their work has been discussed alongside LGBTQ artist-activists Chloe Atkins, Kay Shumack, Marion Moore, Jill Posener, and the Australian Word of Mouth Collective. In 2000, Schaffner and Moyer won a Creative Capital award for visual arts to create Gynadome: A Separate Paradise.

== Work ==
=== The GAP campaign (1991) ===
DAM!'s first poster project, released in June of 1991, was intended to expose the lack of lesbian representation in American popular culture. These politicized posters were intended to be read as advertisements fitting seamlessly into a commercialized streetscape. The project consisted of 500 posters placed all over New York City, including on mass transit busses and payphone kiosks, to highlight the idea that for one to "exist" or be visible in mainstream media, one must belong to a recognizable demographic. The campaign replaced the photos of mostly-unknown celebrities featured in the GAP ads with pictures of visibly queer lesbians. The GAP Campaign critiques lesbian invisibility as well as tackling the psychology of advertising.

=== Do You Love the Dyke in Your Life? (1993) ===
In their 1993 poster series, "Do You Love the Dyke in Your Life?", DAM! mimicked Calvin Klein's underwear campaign by featuring lesbians in place of Mark Wahlberg. This work was a play on the idealized, muscular male body being replaced by "identifiable lesbians."

=== Gynadome (2001) ===
Gynadome is a work of cyberfeminist separatism where DAM! imagines a post-apocalyptic world inhabited by supernatural lesbians. Created in 2001, Gynadome was inspired by "sexploitation and action flics" of the 1970s but through a lesbian perspective.

== Exhibitions ==
- 1993: SILENCE=DEATH Munchner Stadtmuseum, Munich and Hygiene-Museum, Dresden, Germany
- 1993: Kunst und AIDS International AIDS Conference, Berlin, Germany
- 1994: Amendments Hallwalls, Buffalo, New York
- 1994: Becoming Visible: The Legacy of Stonewall New York Public Library, New York, New York
- 1995: In a Different Light University Art Museum, Berkeley, California
- 1995: You Are Missing Plenty if You Don't Buy Here: Images of Consumerism in American Photography Frances Lehman Loeb Art Center, Vassar College, Poughkeepsie, New York
- 1995: Copy-Art Oldenburg University, Oldenburg, Germany
- 1996: Mixing Messages: Graphic Design in Contemporary Culture Cooper-Hewitt National Design Museum, catalog, Manhattan, New York
- 1996: Gender, Fucked Center on Contemporary Art, Seattle, Washington
- 1996: Portraiture White Columns, New York, New York
- 1996: Counterculture: Alternative Information from the Underground Press to the Internet Exit Art/The First World, New York, New York
- 1997: Vraiment: Féminisme et Art Le Magasin-Centre National D'Art Contemporain de Grenoble, catalog, France
- 1997: Revolution Girl-Style Messepalast/Museumquartier, catalog, Vienna, Austria
- 1997: Patriotism The Lab, San Francisco, California
- 1999: Gender Trouble (Unbehagen der Geschlechter) Neuer Aachener Kunstverein, Aachen, Germany
- 2000: The Biggest Games in Town Künstlerwerkstatt Lothringer Strasse, Munich, Germany
- 2000: The Color of Friendship Shedhalle, Zürich, Switzerland
- 2002: Straight to Hell: 10 Years of Dyke Action Machine! Yerba Buena Center for the Arts, Berkeley, California; Diverseworks, Houston, Texas
- 2002: Queer Commodity Mount Saint Vincent University Art Gallery, Halifax, Nova Scotia
- 2003: Ameri©an Dre@m: A Survey Ronald Feldman Fine Arts, New York, New York
- 2003: Illegal Art: Freedom of Expression in the Corporate Age CBGB's 303 Gallery, New York, New York; San Francisco Museum of Modern Art (SFMOMA) Artist Gallery, San Francisco, California
- 2004: Republican Like Me Parlour Projects, Brooklyn, New York
- 2005: Twofold: Collaborations on Campus Richard L. Nelson Gallery and Fine Arts Collection, University of California, Davis, California
- 2006: When Artists Say We Artists Space, New York, New York
- 2008: Reclaiming the "F" Word: Posters on International Feminisms California State University, Northridge, California
- 2008: Break the rules! Mannheimer Kunstverein, Mannheim, Germany
