= Jonathan Meese =

German painter

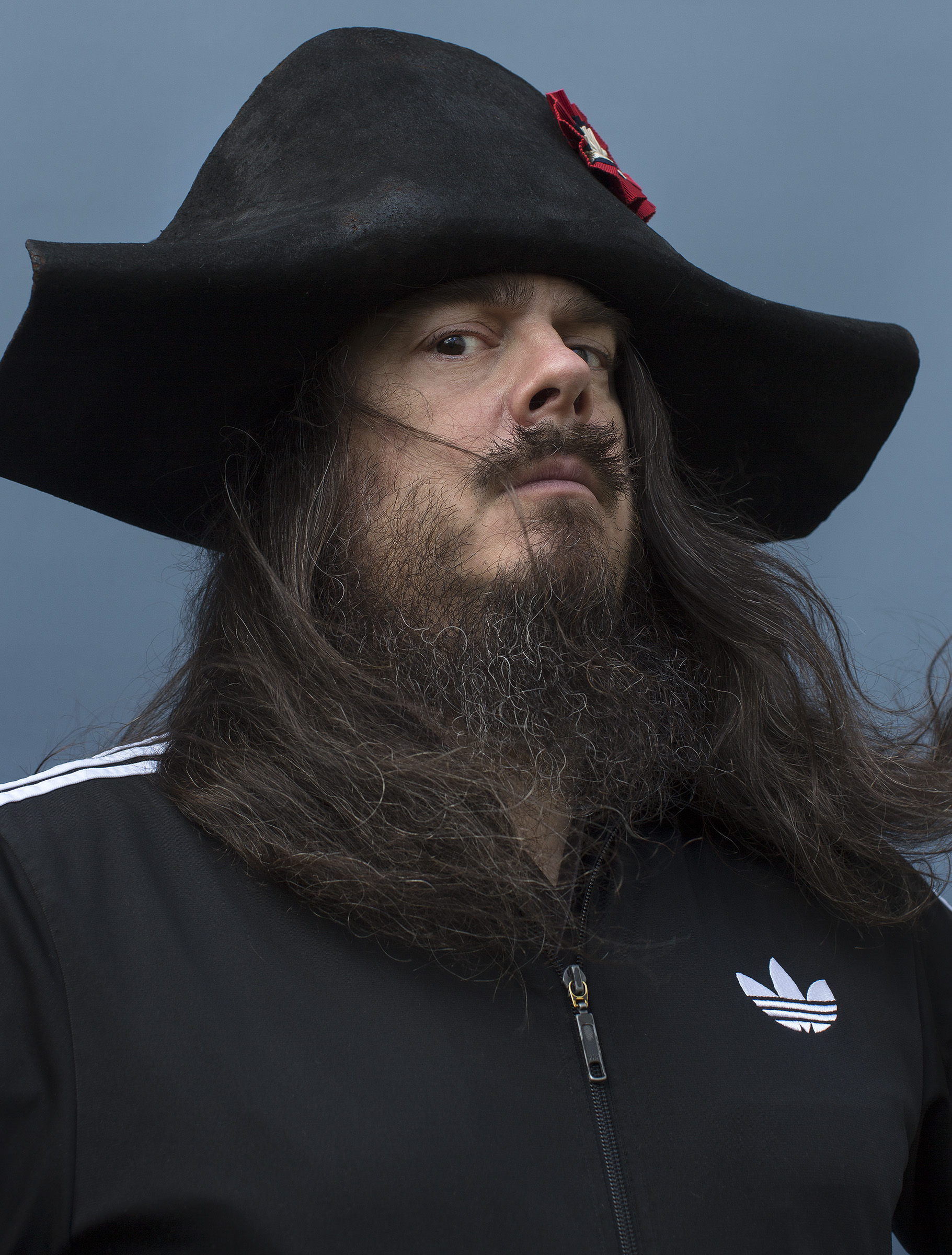
- Jonathan Meese photographed by Oliver Mark, Berlin 2017
- Born: January 23, 1970 (age 56); Tokyo, Japan
- Education: Hochschule für bildende Künste Hamburg
- Known for: Painting, Sculpture, Performance art, Installation art
- Notable work: Dictatorbaby Mary Poppin's Cats, Dogs and Eggpies (The Revolutionbaby de Large is Back) (2008), Spass an de Freud (Geburtstagsrevolution) (2008), Der Parteitag des Erzes (Dein Kind) (2006),
- Movement: Contemporary art
- Awards: Berliner Bär (BZ-Kulturpreis), 2007

Jonathan Meese (born January 23, 1970) is a German painter, sculptor, performance artist, and installation artist based in Berlin and Hamburg. Meese's (often multi-media) works include paintings, collages, drawings and writing. He also designs theater sets and wrote and starred in a play, De Frau: Dr. Poundaddylein - Dr. Ezodysseusszeusuzur in 2007 at the Volksbühne Theater. He is mainly concerned with personalities of world history, primordial myths and heroes. Jonathan Meese lives and works in Ahrensburg and Berlin.

== Life and work ==
=== Childhood and youth (1970–1995) ===
Jonathan Meese was born as a third child of his parents, a German and a Welsh, in Tokyo, Japan. His mother, Brigitte Renate Meese, returned to Germany in the mid-1970s. His father, the banker Reginald Selby Meese, born in Newport (Wales), lived in Japan until his death in 1988. Since Meese only spoke English after his return to Germany, he had difficulties adapting. After a period spent in Scotland, his mother-in-law suggested he study Economics.

=== Study and first success (1995–1998) ===
Meese studied with Franz Erhard Walther, Daniel Richter, Martin Kippenberger, Horst Janssen, Vicco von Bülow alias Loriot, and Otto Waalkes at the University of Fine Arts of Hamburg from 1995 to 1998, but he left the university without a degree. Daniel Richter recommended Meese to the gallery of Contemporary Fine Arts (Berlin, Germany).

Jonathan Meese exhibited for the first time at the Frankfurter Kunstverein gallery in a group exhibition. The first solo exhibition "Glockengeschrei nach Deutz" followed in the Galerie Buchholz in Cologne.

Inspired by Meese's space installations, the producer Claus Boje and the director Leander Haußmann commissioned him to produce a backdrop for their film Sonnenallee (1999). Finally, he also got a role in the film and played the role of a crazy artist. Meese's works for Sonnenallee were shown in 1999 in an exhibition at the Neuer Aachener Kunstverei art museum (Aachen, Germany).

=== First Berlin Bienniale (1998) ===
Since 1998 Meese has attracted attention with installations, performances and other actions on the art scene. At the Berlin Biennale, curated by Klaus Biesenbach, Hans-Ulrich Obrist and Nancy Spector, Meese met a broad public. Meese presented the installation Ahoi der Angst, a photo-collage dedicated to the Marquis de Sade, which was also to be considered later in the work of Meese. Politicians, actors and musicians were presented in photo-collage. The visitors could listen to music, read poems by Rolf Dieter Brinkmann or watch the video Caligula. There were also posters by Rainer Werner Fassbinder, Klaus Kinski, Nina Hagen, and Oscar Wilde.

Due to the increased media presence at the Berlin Biennale, Meese's work was also analyzed and commented upon at home and abroad. Kunstmagazine Art described the installation as a "labyrinth of sentimentalities". The author, Peter Richter, also addressed the spatial aspect by describing the work as a "horror cabinet between porn, Charles Bronson and Slayer". The Berliner Zeitung described it as a "stuffed boy's room". Susanne Titz, writing about the Biennale said: "It was thus clear that Meese had indeed put his finger on the pulse of his generation and presented it."

=== National and international exhibitions (1999–) ===
From 1999, Meese participated in a variety of national and international group and individual exhibitions. Particularly space installations and performances were shown. Often, the central figure of his works is Meese himself: whether in the form of self-portraits or disguised persona, in actions, collages, pictures and drawings. The thematic contents stem mainly from national socialism, as well as linguistic and theatrical references to German philosophy and literary history. In actions and performances Meese especially addressed Adolf Hitler, showing repeatedly and provocatively the Nazi salute.

According to Karel Schampers, "Jonathan Meese can tell a story in such a gripping way that you would never have the idea to doubt its truth. Especially his installations benefit from this quality."

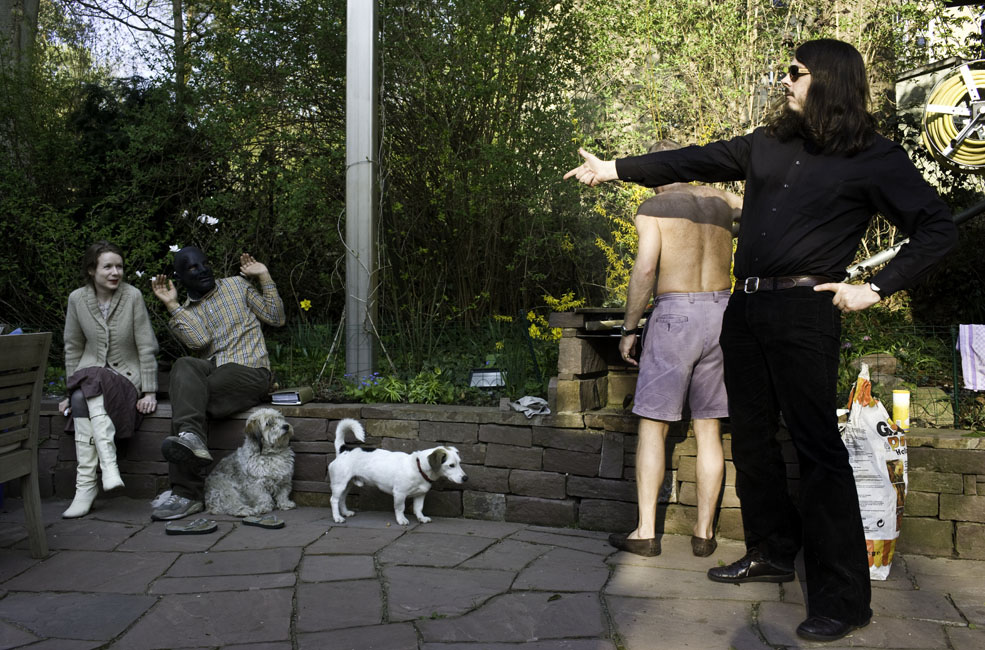
Meese photographed by Oliver Mark, Berlin 2009

Meese has been included in exhibitions "Spezialbilder" at Contemporary Fine Arts in Berlin, "Grotesk!" at Schirn Kunsthalle in Frankfurt and "Schnitt bringt Schnitte" at Ausstellungsraum Schnitt in Köln. Recent exhibitions include Thanks, Wally Whyton (Revendaddy Phantomilky on Coconut Islandaddy) at Stuart Shave/Modern Art, in London, and a performance at Tate Modern, entitled Noel Coward Is Back — Dr. Humpty Dumpty vs. Fra No-Finger. He has exhibited at Stuart Shave/Modern Art, London, Galerie Daniel Templon, Paris, and Centro Cultural Andratx, Mallorca.

In 2008 Meese created "Marlene Dietrich in Dr. No's Ludovico-Clinic (Dr. Baby's Erzland)", an immersive multimedia installation within The Watermill Center on Long Island, New York.

The Museum of Contemporary Art (MoCA), North Miami presented in 2014 the first major solo museum exhibition in the United States for Jonathan Meese, which included Meese's paintings that mix personal hieroglyphics and collage, installations, ecstatic performances, and a powerful body of sculptures in a variety of media. The exhibition was on view from December 1, 2010 – February 13, 2011, during Art Basel Miami Beach 2010. Jonathan Meese: Sculpture was organized by the Museum of Contemporary Art, North Miami and curated by Director and Chief Curator Bonnie Clearwater. In 2007, he collaborated with the composer Karlheinz Essl on the installation FRÄULEIN ATLANTIS shown at the Essl Museum in Vienna/Klosterneuburg.

For the Salzburg Festival 2010, Meese created an acclaimed stage design for the world premiere of Wolfgang Rihm's opera Dionysus. For the Bayreuth Festival in 2016 Meese was offered a contract to direct a new production of Parsifal. This contract has since been rescinded, the official reason being that it would have been too expensive for the Festival to maintain.

== Controversy and criticism ==
In June 2013 Meese was accused and brought before the German Court for performing the Hitler salute in his stage performance "Megalomania in the Art World" which was organized by Der Spiegel in Kassel. The artist claimed that it was an artistic gesture and he was acquitted from charges, in the same year, by the District Court of Kassel (Germany).

== Art market ==
Meese is represented by Galerie Templon in Paris (since 2001), David Nolan Gallery in New York, Tim van Laere Gallery in Antwerp, Galerie Krinzinger in Vienna and Sies + Höke in Düsseldorf.

He has worked collaboratively with the painters Jörg Immendorff, Albert Oehlen, Tim Berresheim, Daniel Richter, Tal R, and the composer Karlheinz Essl.

The best selling painting by the artist was Agamemnon's Hähnchenbesteck (2003), who sold by £132,500 ($269,506) at Christie's London, on 14 October 2007.

== Collections ==
Collections of art that own examples of Meese's work include:

- ARTAX Düsseldorf
- Artothek Nürnberg
- Centre Georges Pompidou, Paris
- Proje4L / Elgiz Museum of Contemporary Art, Istanbul
- Galerie für Zeitgenössische Kunst, Leipzig
- Kunsthalle Bielefeld
- Magasin 3 Stockholm Konsthall
- Museum Abteiberg, Mönchengladbach
- Saatchi Gallery, London
- Sammlung Essl, Klosterneuburg
- Sammlung Falckenberg, Hamburg
- Sammlung zeitgenössischer Kunst der Bundesrepublik Deutschland, Bonn
- Trevi Flash Art Museum of Contemporary Art, Trevi

== Literature ==
- Stefan Üner: Jonathan Meese. Spontan und unberechenbar, in: stayinart, Innsbruck 2021, p. 62–68.

== See also ==
- Die Humpty-Dumpty-Maschine der totalen Zukunft (2010), Berlin, Germany
