= Deana Haggag =

American curator

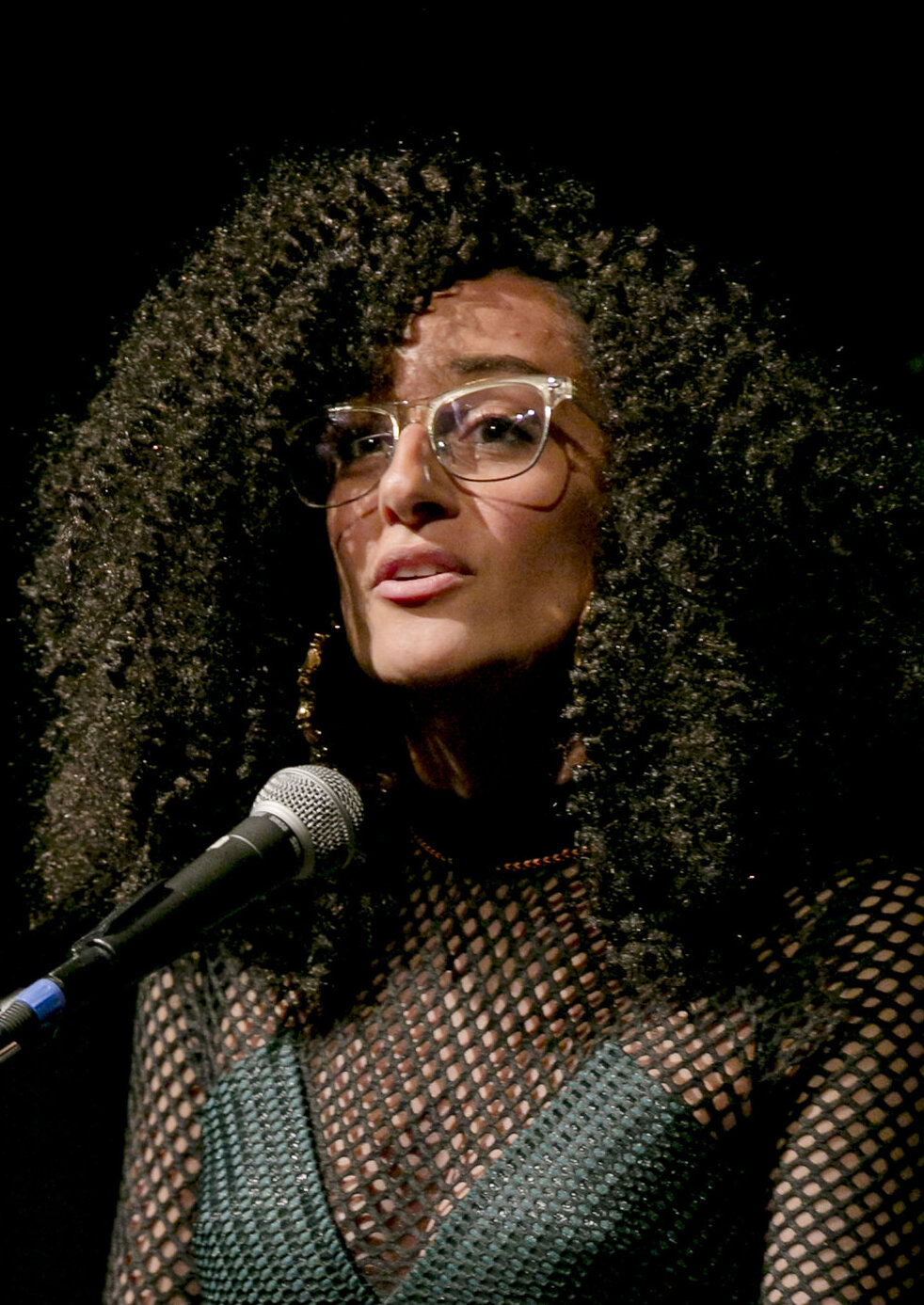
- Born: Brooklyn, New York, U.S.
- Education: Rutgers University–Newark, Maryland Institute College of Art
- Website: dhaggag.com

Deana Haggag is an American arts organization leader. She is the Program Director for Arts and Culture at Andrew W. Mellon Foundation. Formerly, Haggag was the president and CEO of United States Artists (2017–2020), and was Executive Director of The Contemporary (2013–2017) in Baltimore, Maryland.

== Early life and education ==
Haggag was born in Brooklyn, New York and grew up in Rutherford, New Jersey.

In 2009, Haggag received a Bachelor of Arts from Rutgers University–Newark, where she majored in Art History and Philosophy. In 2013, Haggag earned a Master of Fine Arts at the Maryland Institute College of Art in Baltimore, Maryland, where she majored in Curatorial Practice.

== Career ==
From 2017 until May 2020, Haggag served as the president and CEO of United States Artists in Chicago, which provides US$50,000 "fellowships to artists working in architecture and design, crafts, dance, literature, media, music, theater and performance, traditional arts, and visual arts." She had formerly been Executive Director of The Contemporary from 2013 until 2017.

At The Contemporary, Haggag was credited for reviving the museum (formerly "The Contemporary Museum") and turning it into one of the most vital cultural institutions in Baltimore. At age 26, she became Executive Director and sole employee, relaunching the organization following its closure for approximately 18-months. During her tenure, the museum's staff grew to five employees and its budget increased from US$40,000 to over US$500,000. Additionally, under her leadership, The Contemporary commissioned four-award-winning large-scale art projects, including "Bubble Over Green" by Victoria Fu; "Ghost Food" by Miriam Simun; "Only When It's Dark Enough Can You See The Stars" by Abigail DeVille; and "The Ground" by Michael Jones McKean. The museum also created a number of artist resources to bolster the cultural community in the region.

Haggag's work has been praised in Vogue, Cultured Magazine, Artspace, Hyperallergic among other publications. At Vogue, Rebecca Bengal praised Haggag's role in national efforts to protect arts funding:

As arts funding faces a devastating blow, it's an ominous time to be an artist or to take a leading role in nonprofit fundraising, but it's also a time when the arts need a fresh kind of fire, something that Haggag embodies with passionate devotion and an approach that feels both thoughtful and innovative. At 30, she is considerably younger than most of her peers, coming off a career largely focused on curating in New York City, Cairo, and Baltimore, where she most recently headed the traveling museum The Contemporary.

— Rebecca Bengal, Vogue magazine

Haggag was named Artistic Director of the 2020 Seattle Art Fair, founded by Paul Allen in Seattle, WA, before it was cancelled due to the Covid-19 pandemic.
