= Schroeder Romero & Shredder =

Contemporary art gallery in New York City

Coordinates: 40°45′0.86″N 74°0′14.52″W

Schroeder Romero & Shredder is a contemporary art gallery located in the Chelsea neighborhood of New York City. Gallerist Lisa Schroeder has professed a preference for conceptual and sociopolitical art.

Notable exhibitions have included those of Robert Boyd, Kathe Burkhart, William Powhida, Evan Schwartz, and Michael Waugh. The 2006 exhibition "Money Changes Everything" featured documentation from a conceptual work by Elizabeth Sisco, David Avalos and Louis Hock, in which the artists used a $5,000 National Endowment for the Arts grant for a program in which they systematically gave $10 bills to illegal immigrants in San Diego, enraging conservative politicians.

== History ==
The gallery took on the name Schroeder Romero in 2001 when founder Lisa Schroeder partnered with Sara Jo Romero, a former director of the Holly Solomon Gallery. The gallery developed from Williamsburg art space Sauce, later called FEED, that Schroeder helped run since 1992. The gallery, which originally showcased performance and installation, was one of the first in Williamsburg.

In 2006 the gallery left the once-vibrant Williamsburg art scene for a building in Chelsea. One of several galleries to make the flight from north Brooklyn that year, Schroeder explained the decision as necessary to expose the gallery's artists to a wider audience: "Some of the gallery's collectors will visit the gallery booth at the NADA Fair in Miami," she said. "But won't travel to Brooklyn." The gallery was one of several to exhibit at art fair Pulse New York in 2006, "piggybacking" off of the success of the Armory Show.

In 2010 the gallery announced a new venture, Schroeder Romero & Shredder, and relocated to 531 W 26th St in Chelsea.
