= Steve Lambert =

American artist (born 1976)

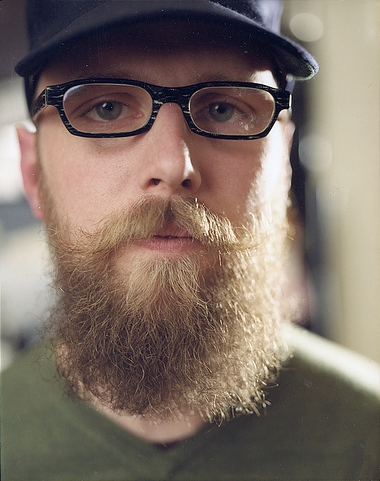
- Born: 1976 (age 49–50); Los Angeles, California
- Education: MFA University of California, Davis, BFA San Francisco Art Institute
- Known for: Street Art, Performance, and Internet Art
- Awards: 2003 Annual Adbusters contest, 2004 Creative Work Fund award, 2006 Eyebeam Fellowship, 2007 Rhizome Commission, 2007 Eyebeam Senior Fellowship, 2009 Eyebeam Senior Fellowship,

Steve Lambert is an American artist (born 1976) who works with issues of advertising and the use of public space. He is a founder of the Anti-Advertising Agency, an artist-run initiative which critiques advertising through artistic interventions, and of the Budget Gallery (with Cynthia Burgess) which creates exhibitions by painting over outdoor advertisements and hanging submitted art in its place. Lambert's artistic practice includes drawing, performance, intervention, culture jamming, public art, video, and internet art. He has worked with the Graffiti Research Lab, Glowlab, and as a senior fellow at Eyebeam.

Lambert is a member of the New York based artist group Free Art and Technology Lab. He has won several awards including from Turbulence, the Creative Work Fund, Rhizome/The New Museum, Adbusters Media Foundation, and the California Arts Council.

== Biography ==
Steve Lambert was born in Los Angeles in 1976. He and his family moved to the San Francisco Bay Area four days later. His father was a former Franciscan friar, and his mother, an ex-Dominican nun. He dropped out of high school in 1993, but went on to study sociology and film, receiving a BFA from the San Francisco Art Institute in 2000, and an MFA at the University of California, Davis in 2006. He teaches at SUNY Purchase. Lambert, along with Stephen Duncombe, co-founded the Center for Artistic Activism.

== Projects ==
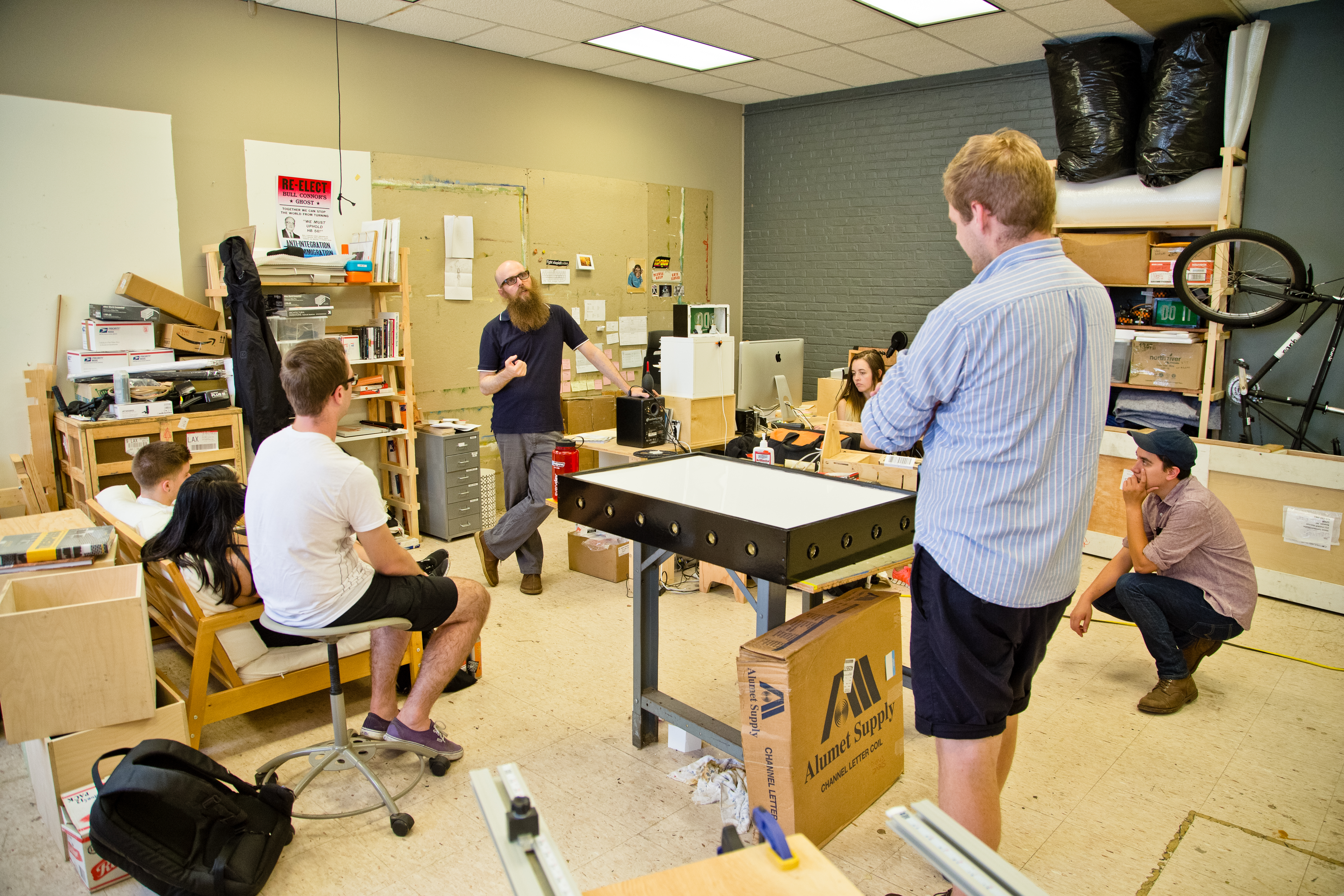
Lambert in his studio at Beacon NY in 2013

=== NY Times Special Edition ===
Lambert was recently in the news for helping with the organization of the New York Times Special Edition, a hoax edition of 1.2 million copies of the venerable paper that was distributed for free on the streets of New York City. A team of 35 people wrote and edited the paper, including representatives from The Yes Men, CodePINK, and other activist groups. The paper was post-dated for July 4, 2009, several months into President Obama's term, and envisioned a world where the Iraq war was over, Bush and Cheney were tried for war crimes, and congress had passed a maximum wage cap. The stunt created a stir, as many people were temporarily fooled by the otherwise reliable newspaper. The project was honored with the "Award of Distinction Hybrid Art" at Prix Ars Electronica in September 2009.

== Exhibitions ==
2009 - (October) Eyebeam Open Studios, New York NY | "Uncommon Ground" - "Uncommon Ground is a sound installation created in collaboration with Victoria Estok. Using stethoscopes against a five by five-foot planter box, people can hear the plant's commentary, discussions, and inner thoughts – which are normally inaudible to human beings. The plants are voiced by comedians and neighbors."

2009 - Charlie James Gallery, Los Angeles CA | "Everything You Want Right Now!" - "Lambert takes on the vernacular of commercial signage with a regional emphasis unique to Los Angeles. Visually, he is interested in what makes certain styles of signage feel so innately familiar, and in the methods that signage employs to grab our attention."

== Additional References ==
- "Advertising Counterprogramming" by Elise Soukup, Newsweek October 11, 2004
- "Wish You Were Here! Postcards From our Awesome Future." by Steve Lambert and Packard Jennings
- Operation: Anti-Ad by Caitlin Moneypenny-Johnston, Xpress Magazine February 14, 2007
- Web Fight: Blocking Ads and Adding Art by Andrew Adam Newman New York Times, May 14, 2007
