= Jenny Snider =

American artist

- Born: 1944
- Known for: Multi media
- Website: jennysniderstudio.com

Jenny Snider (born 1944) is an American artist and educator known for her paintings and multimedia pieces. She attended Yale University. She has been influenced by second-wave feminism.

In 1972 her work was included in the Whitney's Annual Exhibition of Contemporary American Painting (now the Whitney Biennial). In 1979 she exhibited small crayon drawings at the Hamilton Gallery. In 1980 Snider had an installation of about 300 drawings entitled All Painted. All Black and White. All Dancing at the Artists Space. In 2006 she was awarded the President's Award for Excellence in Teaching by Full-Time Faculty for, Queens College, City University of New York. In 2018 the Edward Thorp Gallery held a retrospective of her work Jenny Snider: A Selection of Paintings, Drawings, and Sculptures from 1970 to the Present. In 2020 her work was included in Never Done: 100 Years of Women in Politics and Beyond at the Tang Teaching Museum. In 2021 Snider received a Murray Reich Distinguished Artist Award from New York Foundation for the Arts.

== Collections ==
Her work is in The Frances Young Tang Teaching Museum and Art Gallery at Skidmore College, the National Museum of Women in the Arts (NMWA), the Walker Art Center, and the Whitney Museum of American Art.
