= Jennifer Dalton =

American artist

- Born: 1967 (age 58–59)
- Education: UCLA, Pratt
- Known for: conceptual art, institutional critique
- Notable work: Hashtagclass

Jennifer Dalton (born 1967) is an American artist. She received her BA in Fine Art from UCLA and her Master of Fine Arts from Pratt Institute in 1997.

== Exhibitions ==
Dalton's work has been exhibited in galleries and museums internationally, including the FLAG Art Foundation in New York, the Curator's Office in Washington, DC, Kunsthalle Wien (Vienna), Contemporary Museum in Baltimore and the Chicago Museum of Contemporary Art. She was also included in La Superette at Deitch Projects & Participant Inc. and The Cult of Personality: Portraits of Mass Culture at Carriage Trade, both in New York.

She has been an artist-in-residence at numerous artist colonies, including the MacDowell Colony, Yaddo, Vermont Studio Center, Millay Colony for the Arts and the Smack Mellon Studio Residency Program. She was a recipient of a Pollock-Krasner Foundation Grant in 2002.

=== #class ===
#class was a month-long series of events at Winkleman Gallery in New York that took place between February 20 to March 20, 2010 organized by Dalton and artist William Powhida. #class invited guest artists, critics, academics, dealers, collectors and anyone else who would like to participate to examine the way art is made and seen in our culture and to identify and propose alternatives and/or reforms to the current market system.

=== Making Sense ===
Making Sense, her 2010 exhibition at the FLAG foundation in Chelsea, mines data about various sorts of art world behavior, teasing insiders for their solipsism. Her piece "What Are We Not Shutting Up About?" statistically analyzes 5 months of Facebook conversations between New York Magazine art critic Jerry Saltz and his online friends. New York Times art critic Ken Johnson described her inquiry as "serious about being systematically unserious."

In an interview with Artinfo, Dalton said of Making Sense, "I became interested in Jerry Saltz's Facebook page as an amazing site of written dialogue and as a place where culture is being created on the spot. I think my piece, and Jerry Saltz's Facebook page itself, tells us that a lot of people in the art world crave dialogue and community, and when a space is welcoming enough people really flock to it."

=== Cool Guys Like You ===
Cool Guys Like You, her 2011 exhibition at Winkleman Gallery, addresses the lack of female guests on some of the artist's favorite television shows, including The Daily Show, The Colbert Report, and The Rachel Maddow Show. A large-scale bar graph, "To Whose Opinions Am I Listening" (2011) measures both the number of guests per month in 2010 on Dalton's favorite shows, and the percentages of guests that were male. In that year, even Maddow and Terry Gross interviewed vastly more men, at 80.5 percent and 79.5 percent, respectively.
