= Magda Sawon =

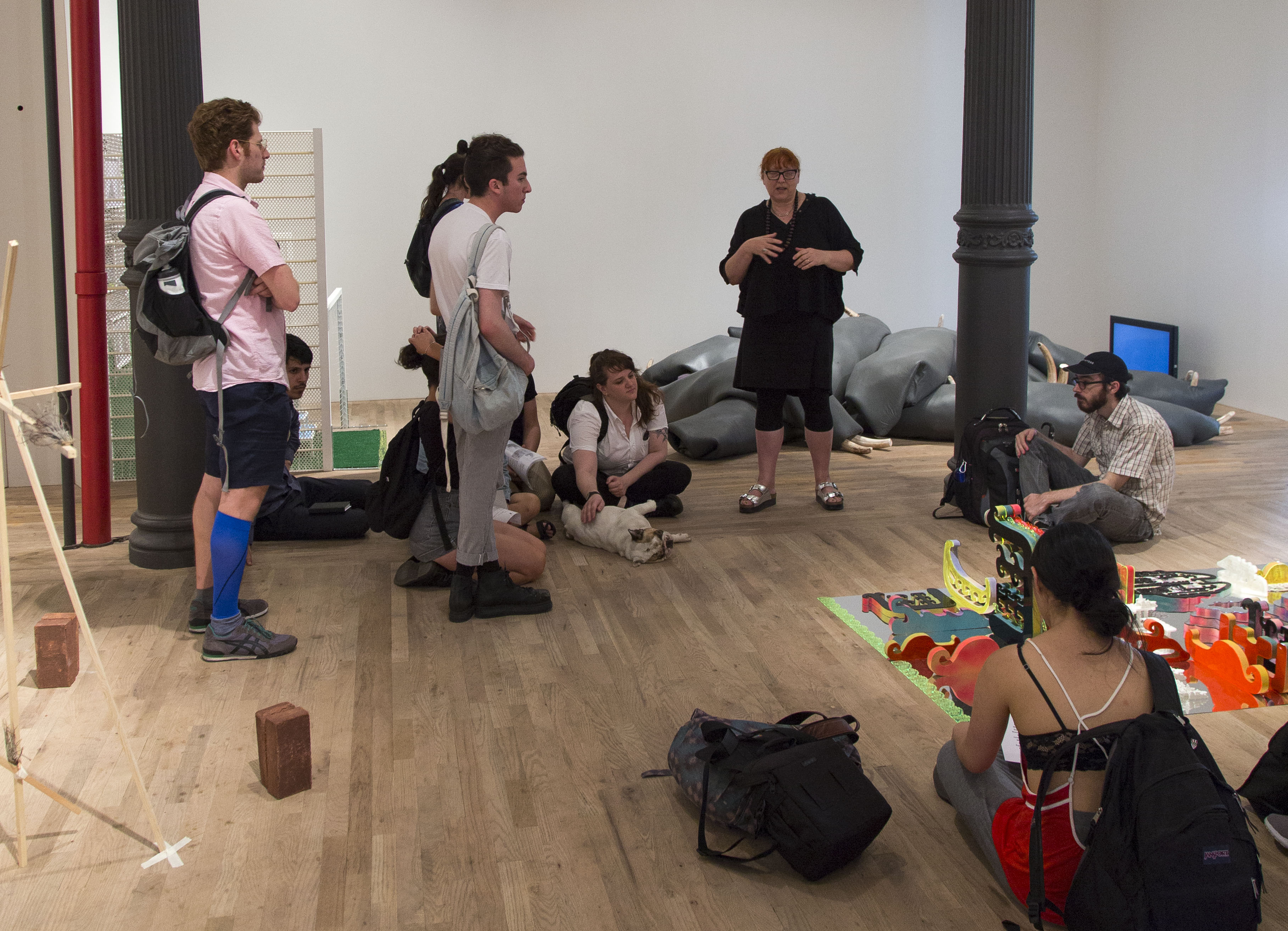
Magda Sawon speaking to a group at Postmasters in 2014

Magda Sawon is a contemporary art gallerist and art world figure who founded and owns New York's Postmasters Gallery (with her husband Tamas Banovich), a gallery for young and established contemporary artists, especially those working in new media, in the Tribeca neighborhood of New York City. The gallery is considered to be one of the "leading experimental galleries" in New York City.

== Early career ==
Magdalena Sawon came to Manhattan from Poland in 1981, having studied art history with an emphasis in Japonism in Warsaw, earning a Master's degree. After a job in a shoe store, and emboldened by a class she took at the New School taught by Estelle Schwartz, she struck out with partner Tamas Banovich, opening an art gallery in the East Village on Avenue A between 4th and 5th Streets in December 1984. The name of the gallery referenced being "post" the European masters, alludes to Postmodernism, and also points to an early interest in mail art and its distribution by the postal service.

In 1988, Sawon and Banovich moved Postmasters Gallery to a Soho loft space at Greene and Spring Streets. Later, the gallery was relocated to Chelsea (1998) and Tribeca in October 2013. Sawon lived in the East Village and Chelsea prior to her move to Soho. In 2002, Sawon sold a work from her gallery (by artists Jennifer and Kevin McCoy) to the Metropolitan Museum of Art, which she described as a highlight of her career.

== Other contributions ==
In addition to her directorial and curatorial activities at Postmasters Gallery, Sawon was elected to the board of Rhizome in 2002. She also is a founding member of SEVEN art fair, started in 2010.
