= William Powhida =

American visual artist and art critic

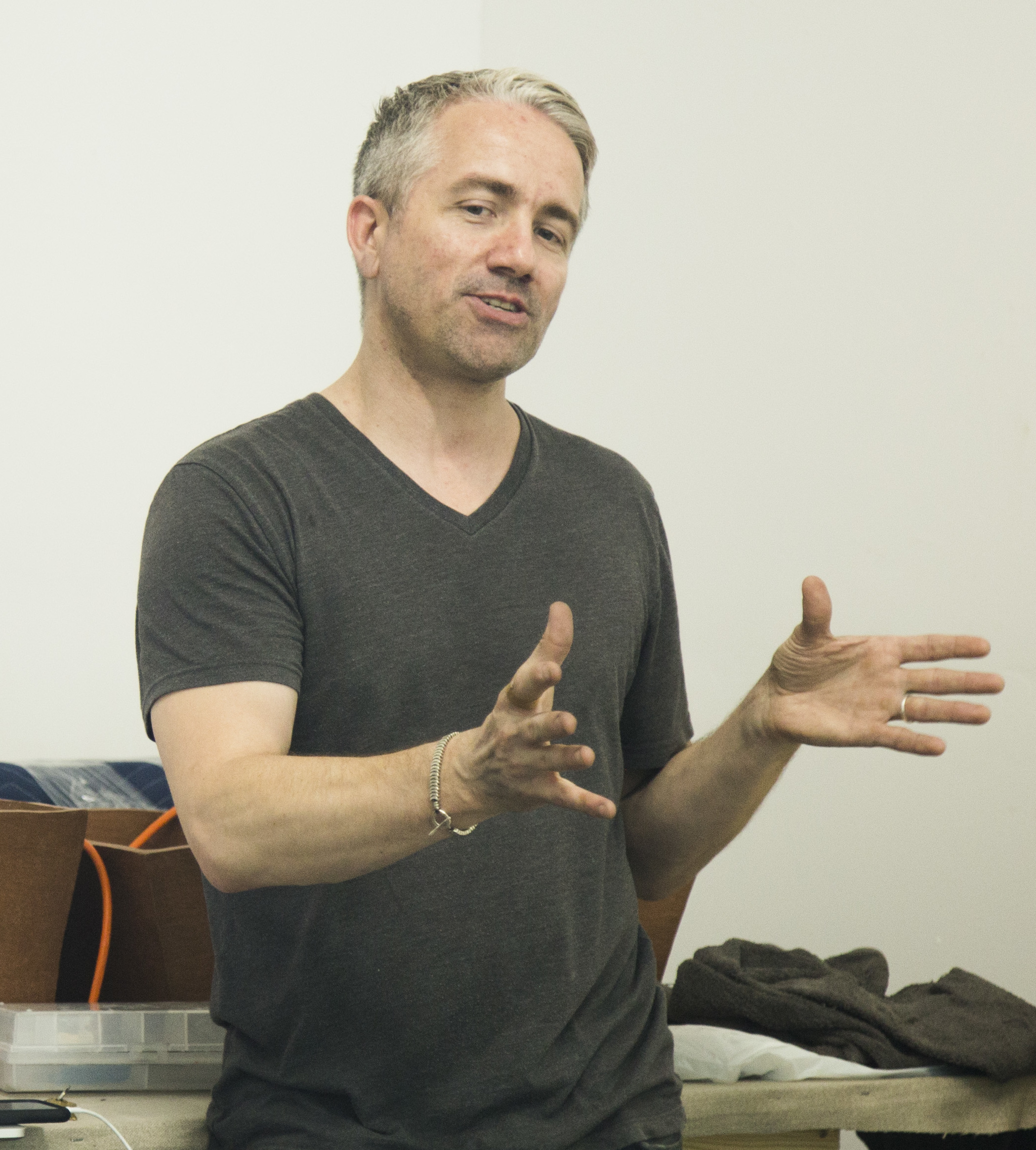
- Born: 1976 (age 49–50); New York City, US
- Education: Hunter College
- Known for: Drawing, painting, writing
- Notable work: How the New Museum Committed Suicide with Banality Hashtagclass
- Movement: Postmodern, illustration

William Powhida (born 1976) is an American visual artist and former art critic. Powhida's work is critical and addresses the contemporary art world.

== Education ==
Powhida received his Master of Fine Arts in painting from Hunter College in January 2002.

== Career ==
Topics have included creating an "enemies" list as well as letters addressed to contemporary curators (such as Zach Feuer Gallery), collectors and critics, requesting recognition. His 2009 piece "Relational Wall" includes portraits sourced from Artforum's "Scene & Herd". He also produces portraits drawn entirely from memory.

=== Early career ===
"The Bastard" (2007)

In 2004, Powhida began compiling lists of enemies, rendering portraits of each enemy in graphite and gouache with insults written beneath each face. Few were spared from these lists, and his father is no exception, who is identified by the word "failure" under his portrait. These early works, which were in an exhibition at Platform Gallery as well as galleries in Williamsburg, display the physical evidence of the artist's toil, measured in sweat and coffee stains left on the paper.

He followed up his initial enemy lists with a Seattle Enemies List specific to the Pacific Northwest, targeting Tacoma-based artist Dale Chihuly and the Northern spotted owl among others. The 2006 exhibition at Platform gallery debuted a drawing of over 300 small head studies entitled Everyone I've ever Met from Memory (That I Can Remember), which Brooklyn Rail critic James Kalm described as a "meta-drawing" demonstrating a level of ambition and commitment to carry out the kind of stoner idea many people have but most would not actually do. The exhibition also included hex drawings of then United States president George W. Bush and New York-based gallerist Zach Feuer and a fictitious Artforum Top 10 penned by himself.

The New York magazine blog was featured in a New York magazine front cover, for Powhida's show at the Schroeder Romero Gallery (now Schroeder Romero & Shredder) in 2007. The work from his solo exhibition This Is a Work of Fiction at Schroeder Romero includes a nine-page handwritten feature that plays on a feature Ariel Levy wrote about Dash Snow for the magazine. By this time he had developed a trompe-l'œil technique, rendering pages from magazines as well as sheets of blue-lined notebook paper as if torn from real-world sources and taped to the wall. These sheets of notebook paper with lists titled "Proposals" and "Reasons" offer a comically distorted worldview that blurs the lines of fact and fiction in an ego-driven celebrity art culture.

In a 2009 drawing called "Post-Boom Odds", Powhida placed speculative bets on which young artists will matter in 10 years.

=== How The New Museum Committed Suicide With Banality ===
Powhida produced a drawing called "How the New Museum Committed Suicide with Banality" for the November 2009 cover of the Brooklyn Rail. The drawing was released in an edition of 20 prints sold by two galleries that represent Powhida, New York’s Schroeder Romero & Shredder and LA’s Charlie James.

The name of the drawing was taken from a post on James Wagner's blog. The work features caricatures of individuals involved in the controversial New Museum exhibition, including Jeff Koons as Howdy Doody, which Edward Winkleman remarked is ironic considering how much Powhida's work owes to Koons. New Museum trustee at the center of the controversy, Dakis Joannou, bought a print of Powhida’s drawing from his New York dealer for $1,500.

David W. Kiehl, curator at the Whitney Museum of American Art, said that drawings like this one, which accused the New Museum of cronyism, expose things that are undercover that people do not want to talk about.

Powhida later responded to criticism in an article published on the Art:21 blog.

=== Art Basel Miami Beach Hooverville ===
At Charlie James Gallery's booth at the Pulse Art Fair, Powhida unveiled a 40 by 60 inch drawing he and artist Jade Townsend had produced called Art Basel Miami Beach Hooverville, depicting an art world shantytown with artists, dealers, critics and curators gathering in food lines. The who's who of the art world are assembled outside the convention center in which Art Basel Miami Beach is held, and which Powhida describes as "the belly of the beast." In the bottom left corner, mega-collectors Marty Marguiles, Don Rubell, Charles Saatchi and Eli Broad place bets on a cockfight with miniature representations of Damien Hirst and Jeff Koons.

New York magazine art critic Jerry Saltz described the drawing as "a great big art world stink bomb" and a much needed institutional critique. He suggested that a museum commission Powhida to produce a one-year-long project that would result in a fifteen feet high, twenty feet wide drawing of the art world as it is today.

=== #class ===
"#class" exhibition at Winkleman Gallery (2010)

#class was a month-long series of events at Winkleman Gallery in New York that took place between February 20 to March 20, 2010 organized by Powhida and artist Jennifer Dalton. #class invited guest artists, critics, academics, dealers, collectors and anyone else who would like to participate to examine the way art is made and seen in our culture and to identify and propose alternatives and/or reforms to the current market system.

Powhida has long collaborated with artist Jennifer Dalton, who worked with him to produce art world condolence cards for Art Basel in 2008 and co-directed a hypothetical, post-apocalyptic art gallery for Powhida's exhibition The Writing Is on the Wall.

== Critical reception ==
In his review of Powhida's 2009 exhibition The Writing Is on the Wall, Holland Cotter of the New York Times called Powhida an "art world vigilante, virtuoso draftsman, compulsive calligrapher and fantasist autobiographer." Art critic Jerry Saltz called Powhida the second best thing to happen in 2009 in his assessment of art in New York that year, praising his drawing for the Brooklyn Rail as well as his spring exhibition at Schroeder Romero.

Critics have drawn comparisons between his art world diatribes and those of 18th and 19th century social critics and satirists William Hogarth, Honoré Daumier, Henri Meyer and Paul Iribe. Critics have also pointed out the site-specificity of his practice. For example, his 2009 exhibition at Charlie James Gallery drew on Los Angeles-based professional actors, voice talents, and film studios to produce his video "Powhida (Trailer)". Other works have investigated media portrayals of place when setting his works in New York, Seattle and Aspen, Colorado.

Damien Cave of the New York Times, who has called Powhida the "gadfly of the art establishment," has pointed out that the artist's own rising fame presents a problem for an artist who critiques the art market as feudal and celebrity obsessed. New York dealer-turned Museum of Contemporary Art director Jeffrey Deitch takes a similar stance, saying, "The irony is that by exposing art celebrity culture, he's becoming a celebrity himself... So hats off to him."

Leah Ollman of the Los Angeles Times has argued that there are two distinct voices in the artist's work, both named William Powhida, Powhida the "character" and Powhida the "author". In a 2007 interview Powhida hinted at the idea, saying, "I do a lot of writing, fiction."

== Lifestyle ==
In the press release for This Is a Work of Fiction at Schroeder Romero, Powhida wrote, "I can't keep sitting around my studio getting drunk and yelling at my assistants forever." He arrived at the opening for that exhibition with a black eye and a cut. After viewing a set of Powhida's drawings about a night of hard drinking and bar fights, art critic James Kalm, taking the drawings at face value, offered the artist some personal advice on sobriety. Other accounts have described a more socially-responsible artist who works as a teacher at a public high-school in Brooklyn.

== Publications ==
In 2007, Powhida collaborated with Jeff Parker on the book Back of the Line published by Decode. Regina Hackett of the Post-Intelligencer compared his facility to the "damning exactitude of a police sketch artist." During a reading of the book in Seattle, Powhida and Parker attempted to orchestrate an attack on one of his own works.

== Quote ==
Powhida has been quoted on NPR as noting that "in one single auction, wealthy collectors bought almost a billion dollars in contemporary art at Christie's in New York." He further commented: "If you had a 2 percent tax just on the auctions in New York you could probably double the NEA budget in two nights."
