= Cordy Ryman =

American contemporary artist

- Born: New York City, US
- Education: BFA, School of Visual Arts
- Known for: Sculpture, Painting, Installation art
- Awards: Rhodes Family Award for Excellence, School of Visual Arts, 1997; Helen Foster Barnett Prize, National Academy Museum, 2006.

Cordy Ryman (born New York City) is an artist based in New York City. Ryman earned his BFA with Honors in Fine Arts and Art Education from The School of Visual Arts in New York in 1997. He is the son of artist Robert Ryman (1930-2019).

== Works ==
Ryman’s early works were emotion-based figurative sculptures but within his first year at art school he began to experiment with abstract representations. During his second year at The School of Visual Arts he was working on small-scale collages. This is where Ryman began to develop his current casualist style.

Ryman's artwork is casual in style and fabricated with recycled wood and metal painted and reconstructed with sculptural elements, mimicking the traditional canvas in their display. The materials Ryman uses include wood, gorilla glue, scrap metals, studio sweepings, acrylic and enamel paints and other found objects. When working with wood, he often keeps the rough jagged edges visible. This creates a very tactile surface. Ryman alters the surfaces of his artwork to change the appearance but still allows for the character of the materials to be recognized.

He sometimes combines mostly mute colors—white, silver, and creamy oranges—with small touches of bright hues on the edges and seams of his work. The end result is a fluorescent glow that is reflected onto the gallery spaces and the artwork itself. In a 2009 interview with Phong Bui in The Brooklyn Rail, Ryman says of his attention to the edges of his paintings: "I guess the main thing about the edges and the sides is that I think about them. In one way or another they are considered. When the sides are painted or accounted for in some way, it makes the piece as a whole seem more like a thing or an independent entity as opposed to a picture of something."

His works range from small to large and often interact with the spaces in which they are presented. When Ryman works on a smaller scale his paintings tend to be saturated with paint transforming the nature of the scrap materials he works with. The undulating surfaces of these works push the boundary between sculpture and painting.

When Ryman creates work on a larger scale the pieces interact with unique properties of the installation space. Such pieces are found in the corners of spaces or rising and falling from the walls. In Ryman’s 2010 solo exhibition at DCKT Contemporary he showed the work Red Brick which consisted of a series of cut and painted wooden “bricks” stacked upon one another in varying shades of red and pink. In this work Ryman questions geometry, order, and the nature of painting itself.
