= Hansel and Gretel Picture Garden Pocket Utopia =

Coordinates: 40.74742°N 74.00527°W

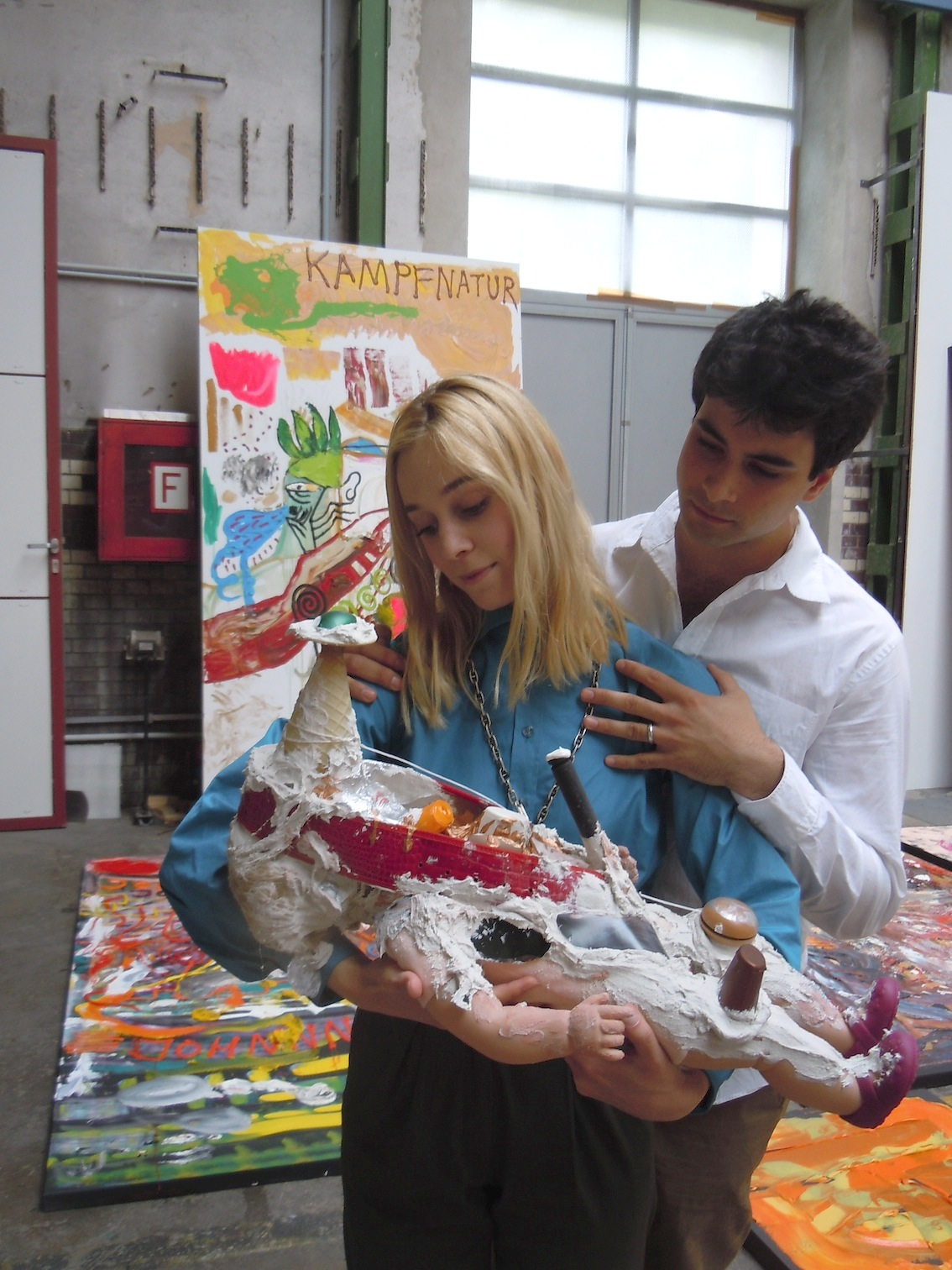
Art Dealers Jason Vartikar and Sarah Christian

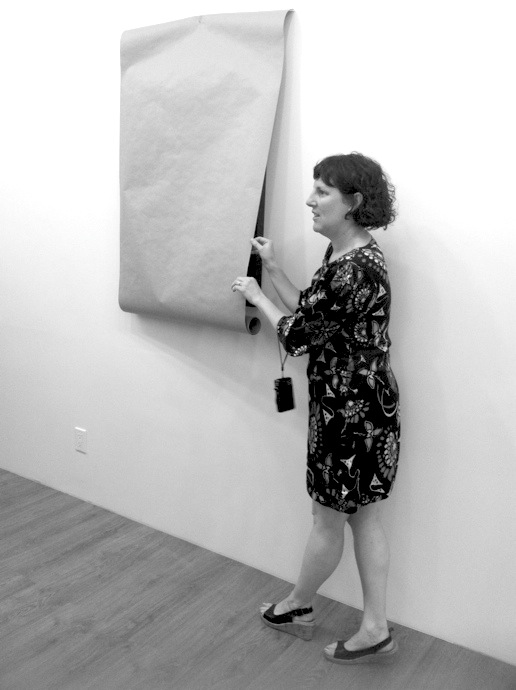
Artist dealer Austin Thomas at Pocket Utopia, unveiling a Mathew Miller painting

Hansel and Gretel Picture Garden Pocket Utopia was a contemporary art enterprise in New York City. The Hansel and Gretel Picture Garden merged with Pocket Utopia to become one gallery, Hansel and Gretel Picture Garden Pocket Utopia.

== History ==
Hansel and Gretel Picture Garden was created in 2011 by artists Jason Vartikar and Sarah Christian. The pair met at Harvard. The gallery began as an activist project space founded in a former horse and buggy stall on West 20th Street, aiming to merge silos of craft and fine art and to "deconstruct blue chip galleries" in Chelsea. In 2013, Hansel and Gretel Picture Garden moved to West 22nd Street, opening a larger space in a former Japanese tea house.

Pocket Utopia, founded in 2007 by artist Austin Thomas, began as an alternative artists' space "in an old storefront on Flushing Avenue." After hosting exhibitions, salon discussions and other events for two years, Pocket Utopia reopened on Henry Street in Manhattan and represented five artists: Sharon Butler (publisher of Two Coats of Paint), Paul D'Agostino, Kris Graves, Ellen Letcher (Co-founder of the now-closed gallery Famous Accountants), and Matthew Miller. The merger with Hansel and Gretel Picture Garden came after a three-month collaboration between the two galleries beginning with Austin Thomas’ presentation of her drawing practice, "Utopian." According to the art critic Roberta Smith, Pocket Utopia became "one of the more singular bright spots in the Lower East Side firmament."

== Programs ==
Hansel and Gretel Picture Garden Pocket Utopia's kunsthalle-like program has included alternative exhibitions from the unveiling of a single painting, to an anonymous show, to work curated from Etsy.com. A collaboration with Polly Apfelbaum and D'Amelio Gallery resulted in 'Flatland: Color Revolt,' an exhibition of hundreds of piles of loose glitter poured onto soft pancake-like bases. A collaboration with C. G. Boerner and Richard Tuttle produced "The Thrill of the Ideal" a selection of 18th century Romantic prints curated and framed by Tuttle.

Hansel and Gretel Picture Garden Pocket Utopia’s collaborations with local, international, and institutional venues are some of its "happenings." Examples include the gallery's public conversations with MoMA, and the launch of 'The Glimmering Room,' one of poet Cynthia Cruz's collections of poetry. In 2012, along with the artist Rachel Libeskind, the gallery was awarded a residency at Robert Wilson's Watermill Center. The result of the residency was the performance-installation "Nacht/Macht." As part of its happenings, the gallery brewed its own micro brew, a malty beer called “Hoptopia”.

Artists on the roster included director Austin Thomas, Dax van Aalten (the American folk artist), Sarah Rapson, Bell May (Mexican-American sculptor), Tatiana Berg (sometimes regarded as a 'New Casualist'), Rachel Libeskind, Ellen Letcher, and Matthew Miller.
