= Xochiquetzal Candelaria =

American poet

- Born: June 13, 1973 (age 53); San Juan Bautista, California, U.S.
- Education: University of California, Berkeley; New York University
- Occupations: Poet, professor
- Employer: City College of San Francisco
- Notable work: Empire

Xochiquetzal Candelaria (born June 13, 1973) is a poet from San Juan Bautista, California, and a professor of English at City College of San Francisco.

Her poetry collections Empire and Show Me the Bells were published by the University of Arizona Press and Tia Chucha Press. Her work has appeared in The New England Review and The Nation and she has received National Endowment for the Arts, Barbara Deming, and LEF Foundation fellowships.

As an undergraduate she performed and toured with June Jordan's Poetry for the People project. In 2013 her work and process were profiled in Poets & Writers. Frederick Luis Aldama examined her poetry's feminist and ancestral concerns in his Routledge Concise History of Latino/a Literature. Cynthia Cruz anthologized her work in Other Musics: New Latina Poetry.

== Published works ==
- Empire, University of Arizona Press, 2011. ISBN 978-0816528820
- Show Me the Bells, Tia Chucha Press, 2024. ISBN 9781882688647
- "On the Teaching of Philip Levine" in Coming Close: Forty Essays on Philip Levine, edited by Mari L'Esperance and Tomas Q. Morin, University of Iowa Press, 2013. ISBN 9780985932527
- Selections in Other Musics: New Latina Poetry (Chicana and Chicano Visions of the Américas Series), anthology, edited by Cynthia Cruz, University of Oklahoma Press, 2019. ISBN 978-0806162881
- Selections in The Poetry of Capital: Voices from Twenty-First-Century America, anthology, edited by Benjamin S. Grossberg and Clare Rossini, University of Wisconsin Press, 2020. ISBN 9780299330446
- Selections in Four Way Review, Issue 23, Four Way Books, 2022.
- "Maestra" in This Unruly Witness, edited by Lauren Muller, Becky Thompson, Dominique C. Hill, Durell M. Callier, Haymarket Books, 2025.
