= Lance De Los Reyes =

American contemporary artist and graffiti writer

- Born: Lance De Los Reyes; 1977; Houston, Texas, U.S.
- Died: November 4, 2021 (aged 43–44); New York City, New York, U.S.
- Other name: RAMBO
- Education: San Francisco Art Institute
- Known for: Graffiti, abstract painting, sculpture
- Movement: Street art, Neo-expressionism

Lance De Los Reyes (1977 – November 4, 2021), also known by his graffiti name RAMBO, was an American contemporary artist and graffiti writer based in New York City. He was widely recognised for his cryptic, poetic text-based street art and his large-scale abstract paintings.

== Early life and education ==
De Los Reyes was born in Houston, Texas, and moved to Southern California during his adolescence. He attended the San Francisco Art Institute, where he studied painting, sculpture, and performance art. In the late 1990s, he lived and worked with artist Shepard Fairey for two years before relocating to New York City in 2002.

== Career ==
=== Graffiti (RAMBO) ===
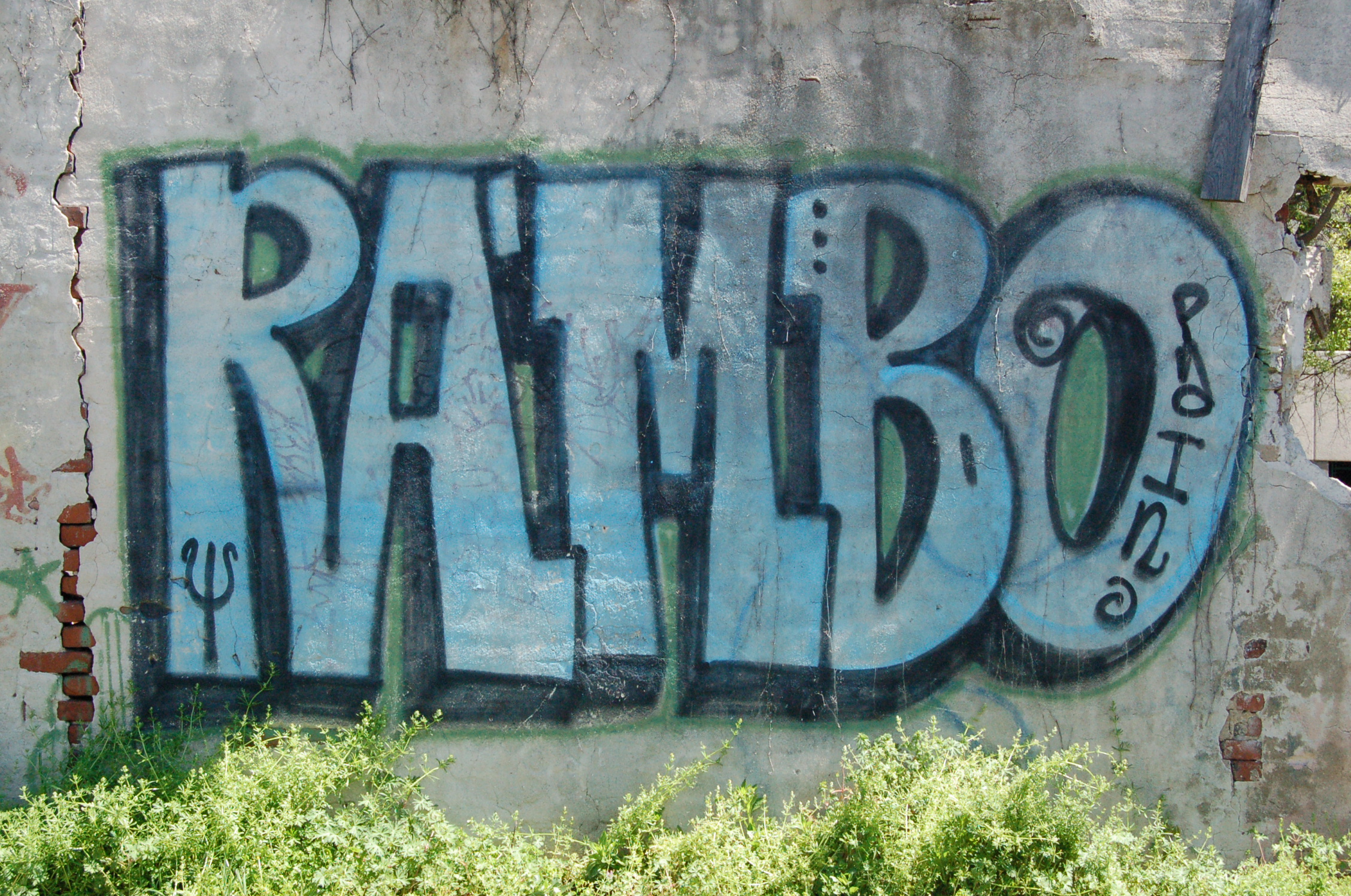
Rambo graffiti

Writing under the tag "RAMBO," De Los Reyes became a legendary figure in the New York graffiti scene. His work was distinctive for its "shamanistic" quality, often featuring all-caps cryptic poetry and upside-down crowns scrawled on high-profile rooftops, billboards, and the Brooklyn-Queens Expressway.

=== Fine art ===
After moving to New York, De Los Reyes served as an assistant to artist Donald Baechler. His studio practice transitioned from street-based text to large-scale abstract expressionist paintings. His work has been exhibited at various institutions, including The Hole, The Watermill Center, and Vito Schnabel Gallery.

== Skull ==
De Los Reyes frequently claimed he had a medical-artistic contract with Damien Hirst. Reportedly suffering from severe bone decay in his jaw, and needed his jaw and teeth replaced. De Los Reyes reached out to Hirst. According to reports from peers, Hirst funded a surgery to replace De Los Reyes' jaw and teeth. In exchange, De Los Reyes allegedly signed a contract granting Hirst the rights to his entire skull upon his death.

Filmmaker and curator Noah Khoshbin, noted that De Los Reyes worked "on a long term project to preserve and present his skull" and teeth via the Gold Teeth Project, artist Chris Martin painted Gold Teeth for Lance De Los Reyes in 2021, and filmmaker Elizabeth Wood writes about the "documentary we started in 2010 about his plan to sell his skull as his final artwork. He had just taken the first step, which was to secure his gold teeth."

== Death ==
De Los Reyes died on November 4, 2021, in New York City at the age of 44. His death was followed by numerous tributes across the global street art community. He left behind his wife Anna and son Roman.

== Selected exhibitions ==
- Standing on the Shoulders of Giants, The Hole, New York (2014)
- Past is Present is Future, Ross-Sutton Gallery, New York (2021)
- Gifts of Telepathy, Vito Schnabel Gallery, New York (2022, posthumous)

== Bibliography ==
- Quiet Lunch: Book No. 4: Lance De Los Reyes. New York: Quiet Lunch Magazine, 2018.
