= Richard Tuttle =

American artist (born 1941)

- Born: July 12, 1941 (age 85); Rahway, New Jersey, U.S.
- Education: Trinity College
- Known for: Painting, Sculpture, Installation art
- Notable work: Paper Octagonals (1970)
- Movement: Postminimalism
- Spouse: Mei-mei Berssenbrugge
- Awards: Skowhegan Medal for Sculpture (1998), Aachen Art Prize (1998)

Sheet from 5 Loose Leaf Notebook Drawings by Richard Tuttle, Honolulu Museum of Art

Richard Dean Tuttle (born July 12, 1941) is an American postminimalist artist known for his small, casual, subtle, intimate works. His art makes use of scale and line. His works span a range of formats, from sculpture, painting, drawing, printmaking, and artist’s books to installation and furniture. He lives and works in New York City, Abiquiú, New Mexico, and Mount Desert, Maine.

== Biography ==
Tuttle was born in Rahway, New Jersey and raised in nearby Roselle. He studied art, philosophy and literature at Trinity College in Hartford, Connecticut from 1959 to 1963. After receiving his B.A. in 1963, he moved to New York where he spent a semester at the Cooper Union and had a brief stint in the U.S. Air Force. He then began working at the Betty Parsons Gallery. One year after taking a job as an assistant to Betty Parsons, she gave him his first show in 1965.

Tuttle's reputation as a master was secured in Europe as it swiftly embraced Tuttle's minimalist art. In the United States, however, acceptance of his work was slower. His works on paper are considered seminal works in American art. His first works, small monochrome reliefs, were followed by making palm-size paper cubes with cut-out designs and shaped wood reliefs that seemed like a twist on geometric abstraction. Beginning in the mid-1960s, he began to create eccentrically-shaped painted wood reliefs, followed by ideograms made of galvanized tin, and unstretched, shaped canvases dyed in offbeat colors. Tuttle had a survey exhibition in 1975 at the Whitney Museum of American Art. The exhibit was controversial and the show's curator Marcia Tucker lost her job as a result, after a scathing review by Hilton Kramer. Kramer, then art critic for The New York Times, wrote, referring to Ludwig Mies van der Rohe's dictum "less is more", "in Mr. Tuttle's work, less is unmistakably less ... One is tempted to say, where art is concerned, less has never been as less than this". According to art critic Christopher Knight of the Los Angeles Times, Tuttle's Wire pieces, which the artist made in 1971 and 1972, "collectively rank as his most distinctive contribution to art history". In 1983, Tuttle made Monkey's Recovery for a Darkened Room (Bluebird), a wall relief of branches, wire, cloth, string and wood scraps, which he says formally relates to Jan van Eyck's Crucifixion and Last Judgement diptych.

In the early 1980s, Tuttle embarked on an extensive series of suites of watercolors, The Loose Leaf Notebook Drawings. Each sheet consisting of a few strokes on low-grade loose leaf paper. The paints bleed and pooled, causing the paper to buckle, giving the works three-dimensionality. The illustration from the suite 5 Loose Leaf Notebook Drawings from 1980 to 1982, in the collection of the Honolulu Museum of Art, demonstrates how the suites challenge viewers to contemplate the distinction between fine art and trash. His works in the 1990s consisted mostly of smaller-sized work, followed by bodies of low-relief wall-bound pieces that integrate painting, sculpture, and drawing.

In 2004, Tuttle installed Splash, his first public art project, a mural 90 by 150 feet with about 140,000 pieces of colored glass and white ceramic tiles. It stretches up the side of a luxury condominium building designed by Walter Chatham for a private, guarded island community in Miami Beach called Aqua. Tuttle has always "privileged newness, not found or weathered elements that refer to past lives and experiences," Sharon Butler wrote in a Two Coats of Paint review of "Days, Muses and Stars," his 2019 expansive multiple-gallery exhibition at Pace. "The distinctive feature of his aesthetic endeavor is his reverence for the present. His objects, though they may convey a sense of wabi-sabi precariousness, are invariably made of pristine materials that reflect the proximate experience of making." Tuttle's work has been extremely influential on a younger generation that has embraced the casualism that he pioneered.

=== Textile works ===
During a residency at The Fabric Workshop and Museum in 1978, Tuttle embraced the silkscreen printing process and the idea of fabric to make a series of clothing — Shirts in 1978 and Pants in 1979. I Don't Know, Or The Weave of Textile Language, on view at the Tate Modern in 2014, was made for the museum's turbine hall and is Tuttle's largest to date spanning nearly 40 feet in length. Featuring the textiles he designed and fabricated, the work is suspended from the ceiling in contrast to the hall’s industrial architecture.

== Exhibitions ==
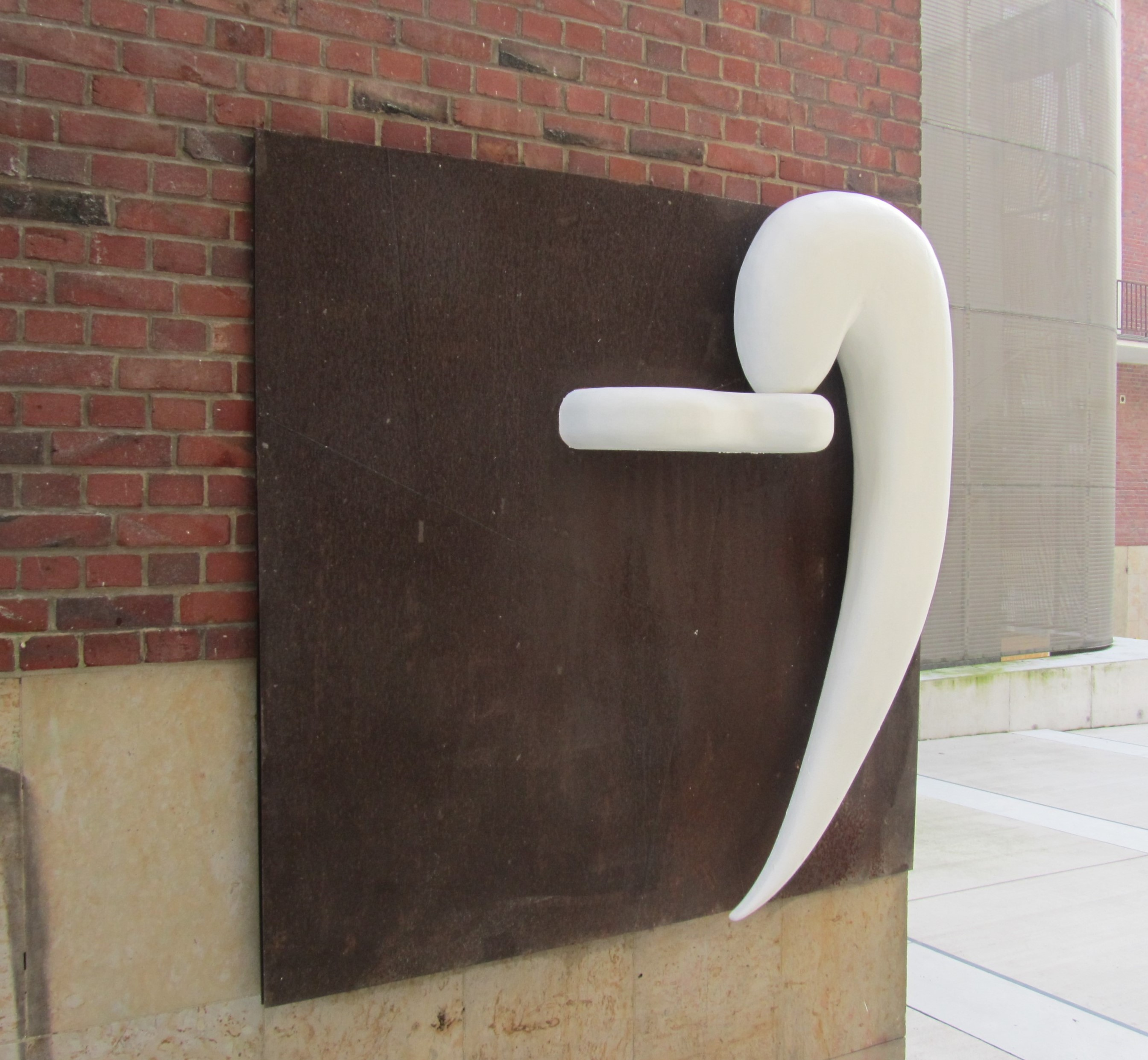
Art and Music I, 1987, Münster (Germany), Domplatz/Fürstenberghaus

Tuttle's first major museum exhibition in 1975 was covering his first ten years of work organized by the Whitney Museum in New York. Tuttle has since been the subject of museum exhibitions around the world, and included in the Venice Biennale (1976, 1997, 2001), three documenta (1972, 1977 and 1987) and three Whitney Biennial exhibitions (1977, 1987, 2000). In 2005, the San Francisco Museum of Modern Art organized a major retrospective of Tuttle's 40-year career. The exhibition traveled to museums throughout the United States, including the Whitney Museum of American Art in November 2005. Tuttle continues a 20-year relationship with the Kunsthaus Zug in Zug, Switzerland, out of which have grown five exhibitions and many publications from catalogues to posters and ephemera.

An exhibition of his new fabric sculptures, Richard Tuttle: Walking on Air, was on view through April 25, 2009 at The Pace Gallery's 534 West 25th Street gallery. A series of his colored aquatints was on exhibit at the Dubner Moderne gallery in Lausanne, Switzerland from February 11 through March 15, 2010.

In 2016, the Metropolitan Museum of Art exhibited Richard Tuttle: The Critical Edge, an exhibition of ten paintings and six fabric works.

In 2018, The Phillips Collection presented Richard Tuttle: It Seems Like It’s Going To Be, an exhibition “…that combines his 41-verse poem with 41 works that he created for each verse.”

From March 25 – July 10, 2022, the Bard Graduate Center exhibited Richard Tuttle: What Is the Object?. The exhibit encouraged “visitors to view, pick up, and hold 75 items drawn from Tuttle’s own collection, ranging from metal work and decorative sculptures to vintage fabrics and antique curios.” The exhibit was accompanied by a catalog edited by Peter N. Miller, ISBN 978-0-300-26635-1).

== Collections ==
The Centre Georges Pompidou, the Hirshhorn Museum and Sculpture Garden, the Honolulu Museum of Art, Kunsthaus Zug (Zug, Switzerland), Kunstmuseum Winterthur (Winterthur, Switzerland), the Metropolitan Museum of Art, the National Gallery of Art (Washington, D.C.); Serralves (Porto, Portugal), the Stedelijk Museum Amsterdam, the Tate Modern, and the Whitney Museum of American Art (New York City) are among the public collections holding work by Richard Tuttle.

== Recognition ==
Tuttle has been the recipient of many awards for his work, including the 74th American Exhibition, Art Institute of Chicago Biennial Prize, the Skowhegan Medal for Sculpture in 1998, and the Aachen Art Prize in 1998 from the Ludwig Forum für Internationale Kunst. In 2012, he was elected to the National Academy and in 2013 he was invited to become a member of the American Academy of Arts and Letters. Tuttle was the artist in residence at the Getty Research Institute from September 2012 through June 2013.

He presented a lecture in collaboration with his poet wife, Mei-Mei Berssenbrugge, through the Visiting Artists Program at the School of the Art Institute of Chicago in April 2009.

== Art market and gallery representation ==
In New York, Tuttle is represented by Pace Gallery. In London, the artist is represented by Modern Art, first exhibiting with the gallery in 2009. Tuttle is represented by Galerie Schmela in Düsseldorf, Galerie Greta Meert in Brussels, and by the Annemarie Verna Galerie in Zürich.

In 2002, a tin wall piece called Letters (The 26 Series) (1966) sold at auction for $1 million.

== Personal life ==
Tuttle is married to the poet Mei-mei Berssenbrugge. For their residence in Abiquiú, New Mexico, they commissioned architect Steven Holl to design a 1,300-square-foot guest cottage, built between 2001 and 2005.
