= Ilka Scobie =

American art critic and poet

Ilka Scobie is an American poet, art and writing critic, and art curator who lives in New York City and Soncino, Italy. Her work as an art critic and poet has been published widely in magazines and in her books of poetry There for the Taking (Zoas Press, 1979) and Any Island (Spuyten Duyvil Press, 2021). With her husband, photographer Luigi Cazzaniga, she has worked to connect Italian and American artists. This work has included the co-curation of multiple exhibitions in the ART AM series in the Soncino Bienalles.

== Biography ==
Ilka Scobie was born in New York, where she has taught in the public school system. Scobie and her husband artist Luigi Cazzaniga live in New York City and spend summers in Soncino, Italy.

=== Critic ===
As a critic Scobie has penned pieces for Whitehot Magazine, Artlyst, Artnet, Artcritical, La Stampa, Marie Claire Italia, Brooklyn Rail., the International Association of Art Critics Magazine and the American Book Review.

=== Curator ===
Since 2000, Scobie and her husband, the photographer Luigi Cazzaniga, have worked with Marie Claire Italia to interview New York artists. In 2010, they began working with the Soncino Biennale in Soncino, Lombardy to broaden the exchange between Italian and American artists. Scobie and Cazzaniga have curated multiple exhibitions in the ART AM series in the Soncino Bienalles, including ART AM 4 Artisti Americani e Non (2023), at the Sala Ciminiera, Soncino, Italy. This also led to a 2024 symposium she participated in at the Hauser & Wirth Gallery in New York which included Soncino Biennal artists Uman and Chris Martin.

=== Poet ===
Scobie has published the books of poetry There for the Taking (Zoas Press, 1979) and Any Island (Spuyten Duyvil Press, 2021). Lynn McGee in writing on Any Island in the American Book Review remarks:

"Native New Yorker Ilka Scobie is not infatuated with the city of her birth. Her regard for the urban puzzle known as New York City is a mature love recognizing its flaws with unapologetic nostalgia. She pulls this off with aplomb..."

Scobie is a deputy editor of the poetry and art magazine LiveMag! Her poetry has been published in their pages and in an other periodicals such as Urban Grafitti, Vanitas Magazine, Poetry in Performance, Long Shot, New Observations, and Phatitude.

== Awards ==
- 2023, New York Acker Award
