= Paul D'Agostino (artist) =

American artist

Paul D’Agostino is an artist, writer, professor, curator, critic and translator. He incorporates language, writing and ideas about translation into his drawings, paintings, and other visual projects. In 2013, he translated paint stains on his studio floor into a series of ink drawings that were exhibited in "Twilit Ensembles," his first Manhattan solo show, at Pocket Utopia on the Lower East Side. D'Agostino's work, which hovers between cartoon imagery and abstraction, has been lauded for a baroque sensibility, vivid imagination, and sardonic wit. New York Times art critic Roberta Smith said his drawings "deftly mine the territory between Marcel Duchamp and Dr. Seuss." Later he went on to create Chromatic Alphabet, a system of painted geometric shapes representing letters A-Z, a piece that was included in "Scriptive Formalities," a solo show at Life on Mars, in Brooklyn, NY. In an interview at The Huffington Post, D’Agostino said that the more he got involved in learning other languages the more he became passionate about the structure of the English language. In 2017, in “Foofaraw & Spleen” a two-person show at The Lodge Gallery in New York, he presented a series of gentle watercolor paintings of fruit and flowers combined with snippets of handwritten narratives that blurred the line between fact and fiction, determination, emotion, and repudiation. He has also had exhibitions at Silas Von Morisse Gallery, Slag Gallery, and Notre Maar, among others, both in the U.S. and abroad.

From 2008 to 2019, D'Agostino ran Centotto a loft gallery, conversation space, and collaborative project he founded in Brooklyn, NY. Every two months he assigned a reading to a rotating group of established and emerging artists and then mounted an exhibition and held conversations around the work. In 2010, New York Times reporter Jed Lipinski included Paul D'Agostino and Centotto in an article about the neo-bohemian collectives and organizations that were transforming Brooklyn's Bushwick neighborhood. In 2021, D'Agostino took the Centotto conversations online via the Clubhouse social audio app. He is the co-founder of two art blogs (After Vasari and ART(inter)), assistant editor of the Journal of Italian Translation, and former art editor of Brooklyn Magazine and L Magazine. He writes and translates in a number of languages, primarily Italian, French, Spanish, German, and English. D’Agostino writes about art, film, and books for publications including Hyperallergic, Art Spiel, Two Coats of Paint, and has translated for many publications and clients, including recently for Specimen: The Babel Review of Translations.

He has served as a visiting artist, curator, and/or critic in many art programs and organizations, including The Pennsylvania Academy of Fine Arts, St. John's College, The Jewish Museum, NARS Foundation, Parsons The New School Integrated Program, CUNY-Queens College, the University of Massachusetts Amherst, and the New York Studio School.

== Education ==
Ph.D. Italian Literature, October 2004, Rutgers University, New Brunswick, New Jersey. Dissertation: Damned to Life: Judging Judgment in Buzzati and Beyond.

M.A. Italian Literature, January 2002, Rutgers University, New Brunswick, NJ.

B.A. European Studies / Italian Language and Literature (double major), Summa Cum Laude and With Honors, Phi Beta Kappa, May 1999, The College of William & Mary, Williamsburg, Virginia. Honors thesis: Radical Right-Wing Populism in the Light of Postmodern Politics.
