= Raoul De Keyser =

Belgian painter

- Born: August 29, 1930; Deinze, Belgium
- Died: October 6, 2012 (aged 82); Deinze, Belgium
- Education: Academy of Fine Arts (Deinze)
- Known for: Painting
- Movement: New Vision, Abstract art
- Spouse: Dina Baudoncq (m. 1952; d. 1984)

Raoul De Keyser (29 August 1930 – 6 October 2012) was a Belgian painter who lived and worked in Deinze, Belgium. He was associated with the Flemish New Vision movement and gained international recognition after Documenta IX in 1992. His works are held in major museums such as the MoMA in New York and the Museum Ludwig in Cologne.

== Early life and education ==
De Keyser was born in Deinze on 29 August 1930, and lived there all his life. His father was a carpenter. He began to paint on his own as a teenager but soon started writing for daily newspapers, commentating eclectically on sport and art. He attended the Academy of Fine Arts in Deinze under the painter Roger Raveel from 1963 to 1964. While at school, De Keyser joined New Vision, a Flemish movement led by Raveel with the avowed aim of "revaluing everyday reality". His wife, Dina Baudoncq, whom he married in 1952, died in 1984.

== Work ==
De Keyser created abstract paintings and works on paper. He switched from acrylic to oil paint in the mid-1970s. His mature paintings often consist of a few sparse casual patches of paint laid over a monochrome field. The paintings are layered or washed with muted tones, and feature primal organic shapes, grids, lines and strokes. Many of the images are based on small cardboard cutouts, continually rearranged.

== Exhibitions ==
De Keyser has been the subject of solo exhibitions in Bern and Frankfurt (1991), and regular exhibitions in Antwerp, Berlin, Munich, New York City, Vienna and elsewhere. For much of his career he exhibited primarily in Belgium and the Netherlands, achieving international recognition only after his work was included in documenta in 1992.

In 2011, he had a solo exhibition at the De Loketten, Flemish Parliament, in Brussels, Belgium, and in 2009, a retrospective at the Kunstmuseum Bonn, Germany. In 2004, a retrospective of Raoul De Keyser's paintings was held at the Whitechapel Gallery in London, and toured to Museé de Rochechouart, Rochechouart, France; De Pont Museum of Contemporary Art, Tilburg, The Netherlands; Fundacao Serralves, Porto, Portugal; and the Kunstverein St. Gallen, St. Gallen, Switzerland in summer 2005. At the end of 2006, there was a large overview of his work at the Museum of Fine Arts in Brussels, Belgium. Other solo exhibitions include the Fonds Régional d’Art Contemporain Auvergne, Clermont-Ferrand, France (2008); Museum van Deinze en de Leiestreek, Deinze, Belgium (2007); Museum Dhondt-Dhaenens, Deurle, Belgium (2002); Stedelijk Museum voor Actuele Kunst, Ghent; The Renaissance Society at the University of Chicago (both 2001); and The Royal Hibernian Academy, Dublin (2000).

He has been included in major international group exhibitions, such as Documenta IX (1992), Der Zerbrochene Spiegel. Positionen zur Malerei (Vienna and Hamburg, 1993) and Unbound. Possibilities in Painting (Hayward Gallery, London, 1994.

== Collections ==
De Keyser's work is held in public collections worldwide, including the Carnegie Museum of Art, Pittsburgh; Museum Ludwig, Cologne; the Museum of Modern Art, New York; Museum of Contemporary Art, Los Angeles; San Francisco Museum of Modern Art; Stedelijk Museum voor Actuele Kunst, Ghent.

== Art market ==
De Keyser estate is represented by Zeno X Gallery, Antwerp, Galerie Barbara Weiss, Berlin and David Zwirner, New York, (since 1999).
