= Keltie Ferris =

American abstract painter (born 1977)

- Born: 1977 (age 47–48); Louisville, Kentucky, U.S.
- Education: NSCAD University (BFA); Yale School of Art (MFA)
- Occupation: Painter
- Style: Abstract art

Keltie Ferris (born 1977, Louisville, Kentucky) is an American abstract painter who currently lives in Brooklyn, New York. He earned a BFA from the Nova Scotia College of Art and Design and an MFA from the Yale School of Art (2006).

== Style and technique ==
Ferris uses several main techniques in his work, including spray guns, chunky paint applied with palette knives, and has included the application of oil and pigments to the canvas using his own body. His paintings are casualist, reference such disparate sources as pointillism, pixelation, and graffiti, and invite the viewer to question what it is they are seeing and to put the images together for themselves.

According to Andrew Goldstein, writing for Artnet, "Ferris became famous for making abstract paintings from meltingly bright blurs of color that seemed both pixelated and powered by the force of their own vibrant chromatic electricity," before adopting the style of using his body, while "wearing a hardy denim outfit," to create paintings around 2014. By 2017, he had resumed using a traditional paintbrush. In 2021, Tausif Noor writes for The New York Times about Ferris's exhibition “FEEEEELING”: "Rejecting a hard disciplinary line between drawing and painting, Ferris revels in that more exhilarating space that emerges between mediums, which allows instinct and intuition to take the lead. [...] Ferris’s ingeniousness, however, is more of a self-critical expansion of his own techniques than a gaze back at the canon, making his style resolutely one of a kind."

== Awards ==
2014 Rosenthal Family Foundation Award by the American Academy of Arts and Letters.

== Permanent collections ==
- The Saatchi Gallery, London England
- The Kemper Museum of Contemporary Art, Kansas City, MO
- The Nerman Museum of Contemporary Art (Oppenheimer Collection), Overland Park, KS
