= Casualism (art) =

21st century trend in painting

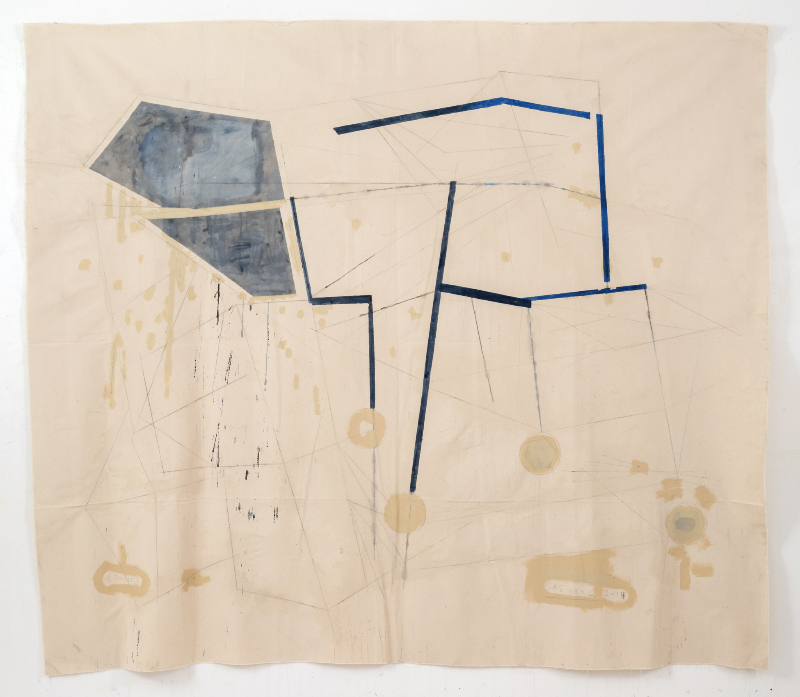
An example of casualist painting: Sharon Butler, Gas Grill 2 (Bomb) 2014, pencil, pigment and binder on canvas, unstretched, 72 x 84 inches

Casualism is a 21st-century trend in American contemporary art which uses color, composition, and balance to produce works with an unusual, rather than obviously visually appealing, appearance.

The term Casualism was coined in a 2011 essay which defined a new type of postminimalist painting that features a self-amused, anti-heroic style with an interest in off-kilter composition and impermanence. These artists are interested in a studied, passive-aggressive irresoluteness that reflects wider insights about culture and society

Many artists responded positively to the essay and embraced the notion of Casualism, while others rejected the term, suggesting it whiffed of 'labelism' and 'crypto-institutionalism.' The Casualist tendency continues to inform much work and conversation around American abstract painting.

Tatiana Berg, Joe Bradley, Sharon Butler, Amy Feldman, Keltie Ferris, Beth Letain, Lauren Luloff, Chris Martin, Rebecca Morris, David Ostrowski, Cordy Ryman, Patricia Treib, Michael Voss, and Molly Zuckerman-Hartung are painters who work in a Casualist mode.

In addition to Casualist, the term "Provisional" has been used to describe paintings that might appear unfinished or incomplete; work that is intentionally awkward, physically fragile and unstable, that reject the display of conventional skills, or that discover beauty in unassuming materials. However, Provisional painters, unlike the younger Casualists, suggest a kind of exhaustion, entertaining the impossibility of painting. The older artists whose work is considered Provisional include Raoul De Keyser, Michael Krebber, Mary Heilmann, Albert Oehlen, Kimber Smith, Richard Tuttle and Christopher Wool.

== Related subjects ==
- Art informel
- Arte Povera
