= A Treatise on Stars =

2020 poetry collection by Mei-mei Berssenbrugge

- Author: Mei-mei Berssenbrugge
- Publisher: New Directions Publishing
- Publication date: February 25, 2020
- Pages: 96
- Awards: Bollingen Prize
- ISBN: 978-0811229388
- Preceded by: Hello, the Roses

A Treatise on Stars is a 2020 poetry collection by Mei-mei Berssenbrugge, published by New Directions Publishing. Her fourteenth book of poems, it was nominated for several awards and won the Bollingen Prize in 2021.

== Content ==
The book's poems examine topics such as the environment and the cosmos writ large, with themes regarding human and natural connection, observation and witnessing, and scientific phenomena such as wave–particle duality.

== Critical reception ==
The book was a finalist for the Pulitzer Prize for Poetry. It was also a finalist for the National Book Award for Poetry; the judges called it "a breathtaking record of biological, chemical, and spiritual entanglement." It was a finalist for the PEN Open Book Award and the Kingsley Tufts Award.

Publishers Weekly called it a "searching" poetry collection with "intriguing, beautiful, yet sometimes frustrating poems take shape as explanations that fail, again and again, to explain anything".

AGNI wrote that "in A Treatise on Stars I get the feeling that Berssenbrugge not only know what she’s building, but is aware of something more: the language and the life that thrives around—and precisely because of—this new thing." The Los Angeles Review of Books noted "there is something hopeful about the vast compassion of Berssenbrugge’s poetry and the living connections she gently illuminates between all things." The Poetry Project said "Within these poems, every thing is touching every other thing, more like processes imbricated, ecologies extending into one another, dimensions porous." Southwest Contemporary said "Throughout the book, extended serial poems move across the page in quietly powerful long lines, resulting in a hypnotic affect. The reading experience is so trance-like and meditative that it’s easy to overlook the book’s investigations into larger questions of existence."
