= The Brooklyn Rail =

Journal of arts, culture and politics

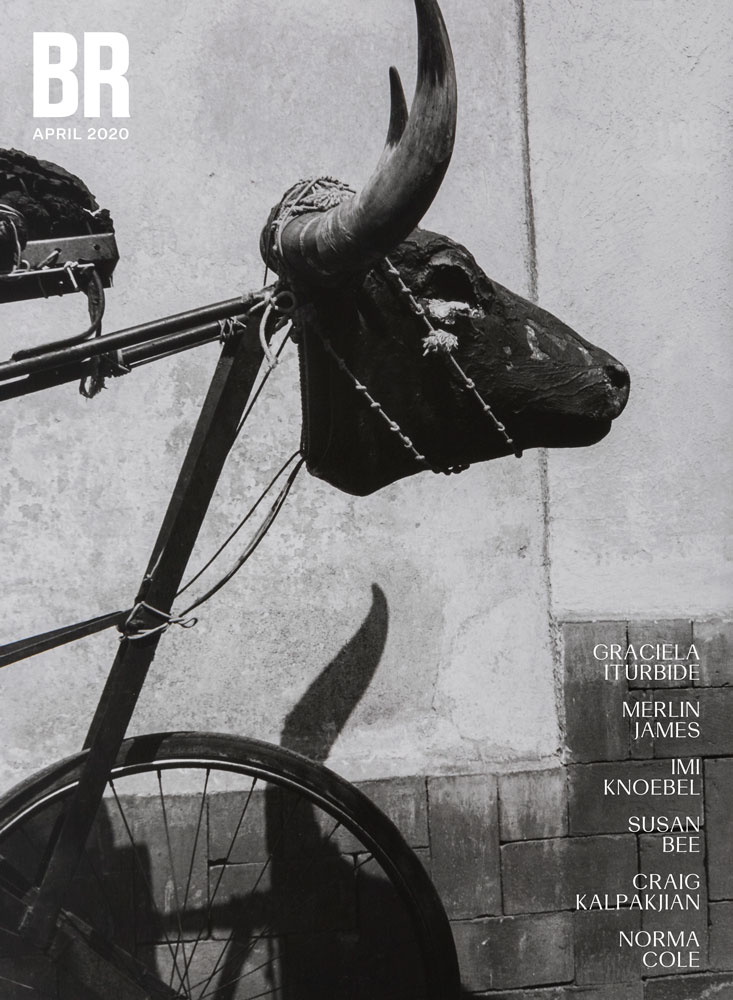
- Cover of the April 2020 issue
- Categories: Art, culture, literature, politics
- Frequency: Monthly
- First issue: 2000 (26 years ago)
- Country: U.S.
- Based in: Brooklyn, New York
- Language: American English
- Website: brooklynrail.org
- ISSN: 2157-2151

The Brooklyn Rail is an American publication and platform for the arts, culture, humanities, and politics, based in Brooklyn, New York. It features in-depth critical essays, fiction, poetry, as well as interviews with artists, critics, and curators, and reviews of art, music, dance, film, books, and theater.

The Rail's print publication is published ten times a year and distributed to universities, galleries, museums, bookstores, and other organizations around the world free of charge. The Rail operates a small press called Rail Editions, which publishes literary translations, poetry, and art criticism. In addition to the small press, the Rail has also organized panel discussions, readings, film screenings, music and dance performances, and has curated exhibitions through a program called Rail Curatorial Projects. Notable among these exhibitions is "Artists Need to Create on the Same Scale that Society Has the Capacity to Destroy: Mare Nostrum" co-curated by Francesca Pietropaolo and Phong Bui, an official Collateral Event of the 2019 Venice Biennale, which ran at Chiesa delle Penitenti, Venice from May to November 2019.

== Mission ==
The Brooklyn Rail's website states that the publication "provides an independent forum for arts, culture, and politics throughout New York City and far beyond," and that it is "committed to supporting artists in their journey and elevating the important role that the arts and humanities play in shaping our society."

== History ==
Originally distributed as reading material for commuters on the L-train between Manhattan and Brooklyn, the Brooklyn Rail began as a small broadsheet with opinions printed in four columns in 1998. The founding editors included Joe Maggio, Christian Viveros-Fauné, Theodore Hamm, and Patrick Walsh. The group first began publishing the paper as a weekly double-sided sheet. Smith designed the Rail's logo.

By 2000, the journal had quickly grown into a full-format publication, with Phong Bui and then-editor Theodore Hamm sharing oversight duties. Bui comments that it's largely due to support from the arts community, and funding from art foundations, that has made it possible for the journal to maintain its creative autonomy. Hamm notes that the Rail's non-profit funding, largely provided by private donors, has preserved the magazine's original aspiration to publish "a crucible of slanted opinions, artfully delivered."

Editors have included Williams Cole, Christian Parenti, Heather Rogers, Daniel Baird, Emily DeVoti, Alan Lockwood, Ellen Pearlman, Donald Breckenridge, Monica de la Torre, and many more.

As of 2017, the Rail had interviewed over four hundred artists. A compilation of artist interviews, called Tell Me Something Good: Artist Interviews from The Brooklyn Rail, was published in 2017. Interviews include Richard Serra and Brice Marden to Alex Da Corte and House of Ladosha. The book was coedited by Jarrett Earnest and Lucas Zwirner and published through David Zwirner Books The collection includes an introduction by Phong Bui and a selection of hand-drawn portraits he has made of those he has interviewed over the years.

The Miami Rail is an editorially independent expansion of The Brooklyn Rail founded by Nina Johnson Milewski with Brooklyn Rail editor Phong Bui and support from the Knight Foundation.

== Notable contributors ==
- Paul Auster
- John Ashbery
- Dore Ashton
- Olivier Berggruen
- Bill Berkson
- Charles Bernstein
- Anselm Berrigan
- Mei-mei Berssenbrugge
- Carlos Brillembourg
- Mahogany L. Browne
- J. Scott Burgeson
- David Carrier
- Dan Cameron
- Mary Ann Caws
- Neeli Cherkovski
- Norma Cole
- DJ Spooky
- Brian O'Doherty
- John Elderfield
- Sean Gill
- Thyrza Nichols Goodeve
- Benoît Gréan
- Bob Holman
- Joan Kee
- Donald Kuspit
- Ann Lauterbach
- Ralph Lemon
- Jonathan Lethem
- Lucy Lippard
- Barbara London
- Paul Mattick Jr.
- Ann McCoy
- Jonas Mekas
- W. J. T. Mitchell
- Robert C. Morgan
- Eileen Myles
- Saul Ostrow
- Marjorie Perloff
- Harry Philbrick
- Robert Pincus-Witten
- Joachim Pissarro
- Nancy Princenthal
- Kristin Prevallet
- Carter Ratcliff
- Maura Reilly
- Radoslav Rochallyi
- Barbara Rose
- Irving Sandler
- Ilka Scobie
- Barry Schwabsky
- David Shapiro
- Lowery Stokes Sims
- Pamela Sneed
- Robert Storr
- David Levi Strauss
- Cole Swensen
- Cecilia Vicuña
- Jasmine Wahi
- Anne Waldman
- Amei Wallach
- McKenzie Wark
- Marina Warner
- Lawrence Weschler
- Peter Lamborn Wilson
- John Yau
- Octavio Zaya

== Projects ==
=== Rail Curatorial Projects ===
In 2013, the Brooklyn Rail established Rail Curatorial Projects, an initiative to manifest the journal's goals within an exhibition context. That same year, the Brooklyn Rail was invited by the Dedalus Foundation to curate an exhibition which resulted in Come Together: Surviving Sandy, Year One (2013, Industry City), a momentous exhibition of hundreds of New York and Brooklyn artists. Come Together was named the #1 exhibition in New York City by Jerry Saltz in New York Magazine and in the New York Times, Roberta Smith wrote, “This egalitarian show makes palpable the greatness of New York’s real art world.” In 2014, the exhibition was commemorated in a hardcover catalogue.

Since then, the Rail Curatorial Projects has curated a number of shows including Ad Reinhardt at 100 at TEMP Art Space; Spaced Out: Migration to the Interior (2014, Red Bull Studios); Bloodflames Revisited (2014, Paul Kasmin Gallery); and 24/7 (2014, Miami Beach Monte Carlo); Intimacy in Discourse: Reasonable and Unreasonable Sized Paintings (2015, SVA Chelsea Gallery and Mana Contemporary) as well as Social Ecologies at Industry City; Patricia Cronin's Shrine for Girls at the Venice Biennale in 2015; Hallway Hijack at 66 Rockwell Place in 2016. In 2017, Rail Curatorial Projects curated Occupy Mana: Artists Need to Create on the Same Scale That Society Has the Capacity to Destroy; Hallway Hijack (2016, 66 Rockwell Place); OCCUPY MANA: Artists Need to Create on the Same Scale That Society Has the Capacity to Destroy, Year 1 (2017, Mana Contemporary).

In May 2019, the Rail was invited to curate an exhibition for the 2019 Venice Biennale. The show was a continuation of 2017's OCCUPY MANA, curated by the Rail's Phong Bui and Italian art historian, critic and curator Francesca Pietropaolo, the show consisted of 73 different artists; with works discussing the social and ecological climate of our reality titled Artists Need to Create on the Same Scale that Society Has the Capacity to Destroy: Mare Nostrum (2019, Venice Biennale). The Rail Curatorial Projects opened OCCUPY COLBY: Artists Need to Create on the Same Scale That Society Has the Capacity to Destroy, Year 2 (2019, Colby Museum of Art). The show was on the same lengths of OCCUPY MANA as well as Social Environment.

=== We the Immigrants ===
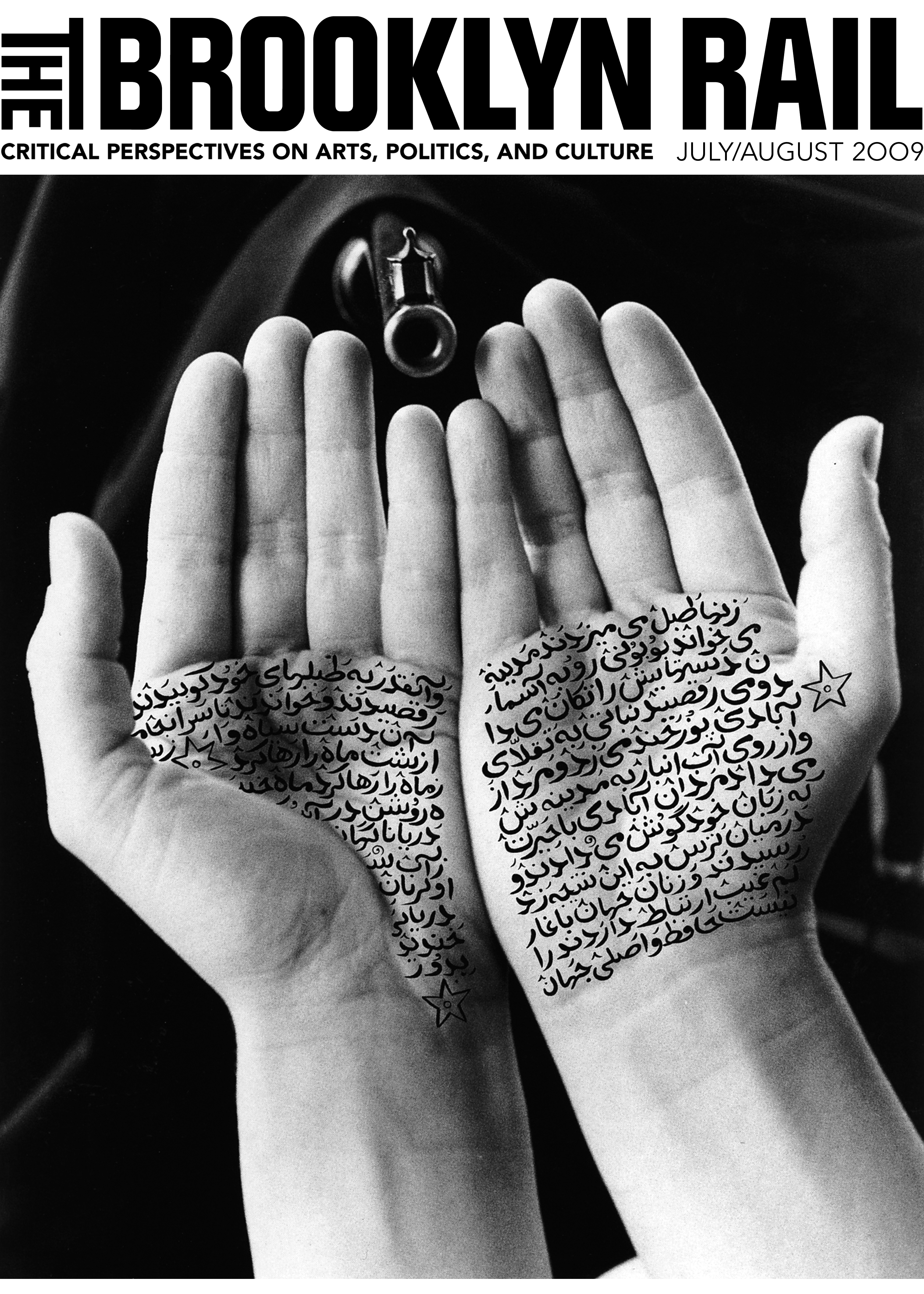
July/August 2009 cover

We the Immigrants is a project that at promotes and elevates immigrants in the many communities across America. It honors the artists and innovators who have immigrated to the U.S. and made an impact across the sciences, arts, and humanities. It is an ongoing online project, featuring links to Wikipedia pages and organizes immigrants along with their name, country of origin and year of birth in a checkered layout inspired by Zoom.

=== The New Social Environment ===
In March, 2020, as the COVID-19 pandemic in New York City forced arts organizations and museums around the world to close their doors, the team at the Brooklyn Rail shifted their operations online and started hosting daily conversations with artists, writers, poets, filmmakers, dancers, and musicians around the world. Called The New Social Environments, these daily lunchtime conversations wink at artist Joseph Beuys’s concept of Social Sculpture, where making art is less fleeting and precious and more woven democratically into our lives. There have been over 200 archived conversations as of January 2020 and guests have included Kent Monkman, Kay Gabriel, Njideka Akunyili Crosby, Giuseppe Penone, Noam Chomsky, Thelma Golden, Ai Wei Wei, Rosa Barba, Jordan Casteel, Paul D. Miller, Luca Buvoli, Eric Fischl, and Yvonne Rainier.

== Rail Editions ==
Rail Editions is a press imprint of the Brooklyn Rail which publishes books of art, poetry, fiction, artists’ writings, works in translation, and more.

Previous titles include: On Ron Gorchov (2008), edited by Phong Bui; Pieces of a Decade: Brooklyn Rail Nonfiction 2000–2010 (2010), edited by Theodore Hamm and Williams Cole; Texts on (Texts on) Art (2012), a collection of essays by the art historian Joseph Masheck; The Brooklyn Rail Fiction Anthology 2 (2013), edited by Donald Breckenridge; Oh Sandy! A Remembrance (2015), a collection of poems commissioned in the wake of superstorm Hurricane Sandy; Cephalonia (2016), a narrative poem by Luigi Ballerini; Swept Up By Art (2016), the second memoir of the art historian and critic Irving Sandler; and Our Book: Florbela Espanca Selected Poems (2018), the first translation into English of Portuguese poet Florbela Espanca's poetry. Words Apart and Others (2018) by Jonas Mekas as well as a companion of responses, Message Ahead (2018), were published in 2018. Bending Concepts features a collection of 26 artists, writers, and critics thoughts on visual culture and society during the mid-2010s. Edited by Jonathan T.D., Bending Concepts includes notable works by Claire Bishop, David Levi Strauss, Ariella Azoulay, Sheila Heti, and many more.

=== Special editions ===
- River Rail (January 2018)
- I Love John Giorno (June 2017)
- On the State of Art Criticism in Europe (May 2014)
- Ad Reinhardt (January 2014)

== Reception ==
Robert Storr has called it "the murmur of the city in print."

Former Nation publisher Victor Navasky considered it "a non-establishment paper that questioned the establishment's assumptions without falling victim to the counterculture's pieties."

For the late Nancy Spero, the paper was "an eminently readable, informative, and intellectually wide-ranging publication, alert to current trends, controversies, and ideas, and filled with necessary information."

Poet John Ashbery has written: "how wonderful to have a new newspaper that cares about literature and the arts and isn't afraid to say so. The Brooklyn Rail is a welcome addition to the New York scene."

American painter Alex Katz has said that the Rail "has the young energy that goes with the young people who come to New York to grow in the arts. It would be a bad city without it. If it wasn't for the Brooklyn Rail, the city would be a desert.”

In 2013 the Rail was awarded the Best Art Reporting by the International Association of Art Critics, United States Section (AICA-USA).

== See also ==
- List of New York City newspapers and magazines
- List of art magazines
- List of literary magazines
