= Theodore Hamm (writer) =

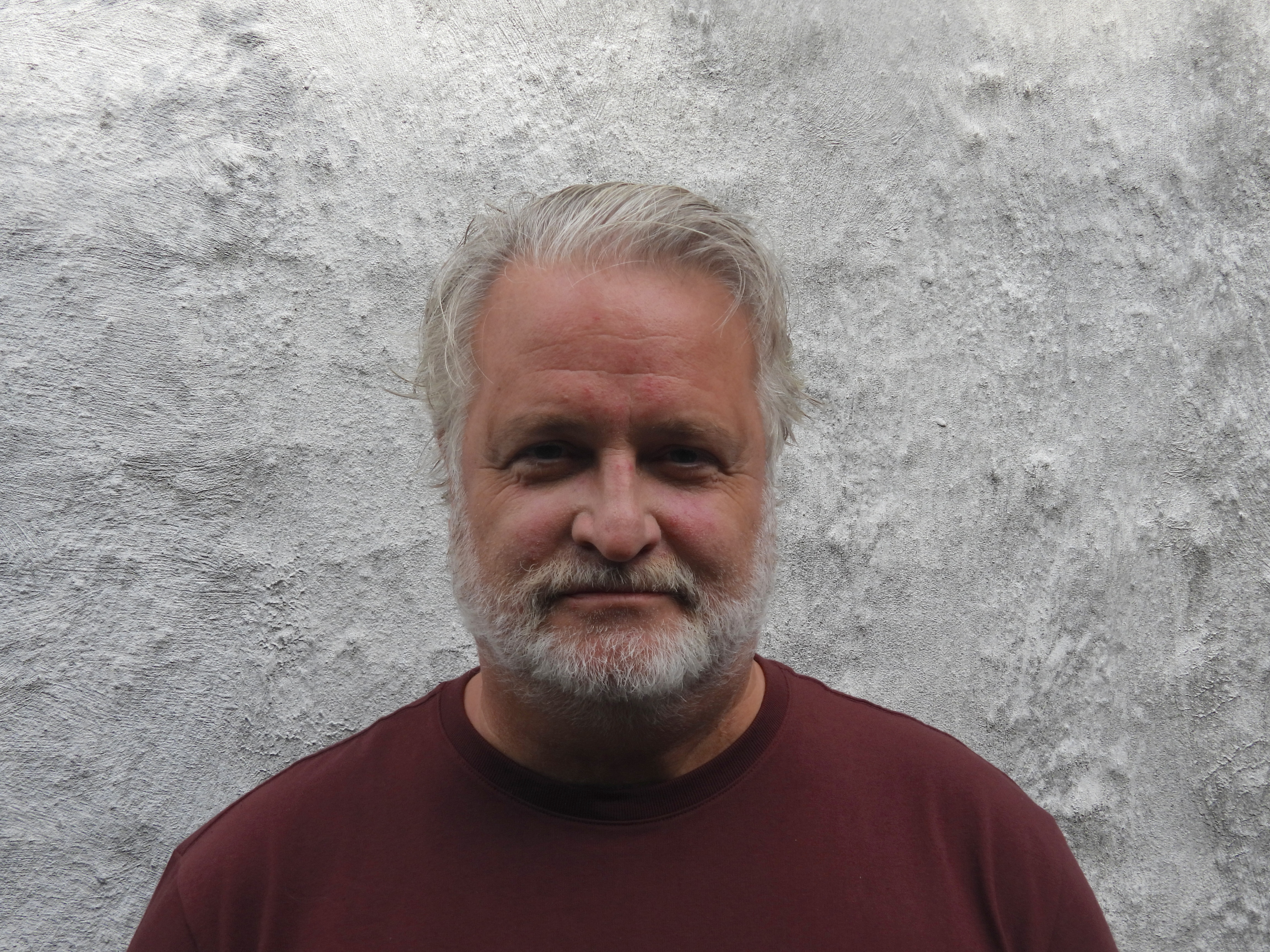
Theodore Hamm

Theodore Hamm (born September 14, 1966, in Chicago) is an American author, writer, professor and the founding editor of the New York City-based literary and culture tabloid The Brooklyn Rail. He writes about New York City politics and criminal justice for The Indypendent and other publications. Hamm currently serves as the director of the Journalism and New Media Studies department at St. Joseph's University, in Clinton Hill, Brooklyn.

== Books ==
Hamm is the author of Run Zohran Run! Inside Zohran Mamdani’s Sensational Campaign to Become New York City’s First Democratic Socialist Mayor, published by OR Books in October 2025.

Hamm's previous books include Bernie's Brooklyn: How the New Deal City Shaped Bernie Sanders' Politics, published by OR Books in 2020.

He is the editor of Frederick Douglass in Brooklyn, an annotated collection of speeches given by the abolitionist at leading Brooklyn institutions, which was published by Akashic Books in 2017.

He is the author of The New Blue Media: How Michael Moore, MoveOn.org, Jon Stewart and Company Are Transforming Progressive Politics, which was published in May 2008 by the New Press. His first book, Rebel and a Cause, about the 1960 execution of San Quentin death row author Caryl Chessman, was published by the University of California Press in 2001.

Hamm is co-editor (with Williams Cole) of Pieces of a Decade: Brooklyn Rail Nonfiction 2000-2010. His first novel, Hank Thompson's Blues, was published by Nobody Rocks Press in May 2009. From 2005-2015 he was a member of the Brooklyn Literary Council, which organizes the Brooklyn Book Festival.

== Career ==
Hamm holds a B.A. in American studies from Rutgers University (1988) and a Ph.D. in American history from the University of California-Davis (1996). His articles about New York City politics and culture have appeared recently in The Indypendent, Jacobin and City Limits. In 1997, he received the Outstanding Volunteer Service award from San Quentin State Prison for teaching in the prison's college program. He resides in Sunset Park, Brooklyn.
