= Sharon Butler =

Painter and art blogger (born 1959)

- Born: 1959 (age 66–67); New London, Connecticut, U.S.
- Education: Tufts University, Massachusetts College of Art, University of Connecticut
- Known for: Abstract painting, Art blogging
- Notable work: Two Coats of Paint
- Movement: Casualism
- Awards: Creative Capital, Warhol Foundation, Pollock-Krasner Foundation
- Website: www.sharonlbutler.com

Sharon Butler (born 1959) is an American artist and arts writer. She is known for teasing out ideas about contemporary abstraction in her art and writing, particularly a style she called "new casualism" in a 2011 essay. Butler uses process as metaphor and has said in artist's talks that she is keenly interested in creating paintings as documentation of her life. In a 2014 review in the Washington Post, art critic Michael Sullivan wrote that Butler "creates sketchy, thinly painted washes that hover between representation and abstraction.Though boasting such mechanistic titles as 'Tower Vents' and 'Turbine Study,' Butler’s dreamlike renderings, which use tape to only suggest the roughest outlines of architectural forms, feel like bittersweet homages to urban decay." Critic Thomas Micchelli proposed that Butler's work shares "Rauschenberg’s dissolution of the barriers between painting and sculpture," particularly where the canvases are "stapled almost willy-nilly to the front of the stretcher bars, which are visible along the edges of some of the works."

From 2016-2023, her canvases were based on small daily drawings that she made each day (2016-2020) in a phone app and posted on Instagram. In a 2018 conversation about the process of making paintings from these diminutive digital images, she said that the sense of surface and touch are inherent to a painting must be invented in the digital space. The images are never what they seem, especially when viewed on the phone." Critic Laurie Fendrich called Butler's work "beautiful and grittily compelling," suggesting in a 2021 review that her brushwork and color come out of her earlier casualist approach.The paintings "feel slightly off-balance, but not so much that they’re ugly. They’re actually just right: off-balance only enough to avoid cliché."

In a 2023 review in The Brooklyn Rail, Adam Simon wrote that Butler approaches geometric abstraction with an unusual restlessness and an idiosyncratic penchant for disequilibrium, and he declared that her paintings are full of "innuendo and wit."

She has said that at the root of her art practice is an effort to understand the relationship between emotion and intellect. "The tension between exacting, mechanical processes -- often digital and screen-based -- and the humanism inherent in handmade images and objects have always been stand-ins -- a visual metaphor -- in my work." In 2024, she switched to water-based media, soaking "raw canvas with paint in irregularly shaped geometries to suggest dissolution. The delicate forms, brushed and drawn, evoke a sense of vulnerability. Inspired by hurricane devastation in the coastal town where she grew up, her process reflects the way we absorb experience and environment into memory."

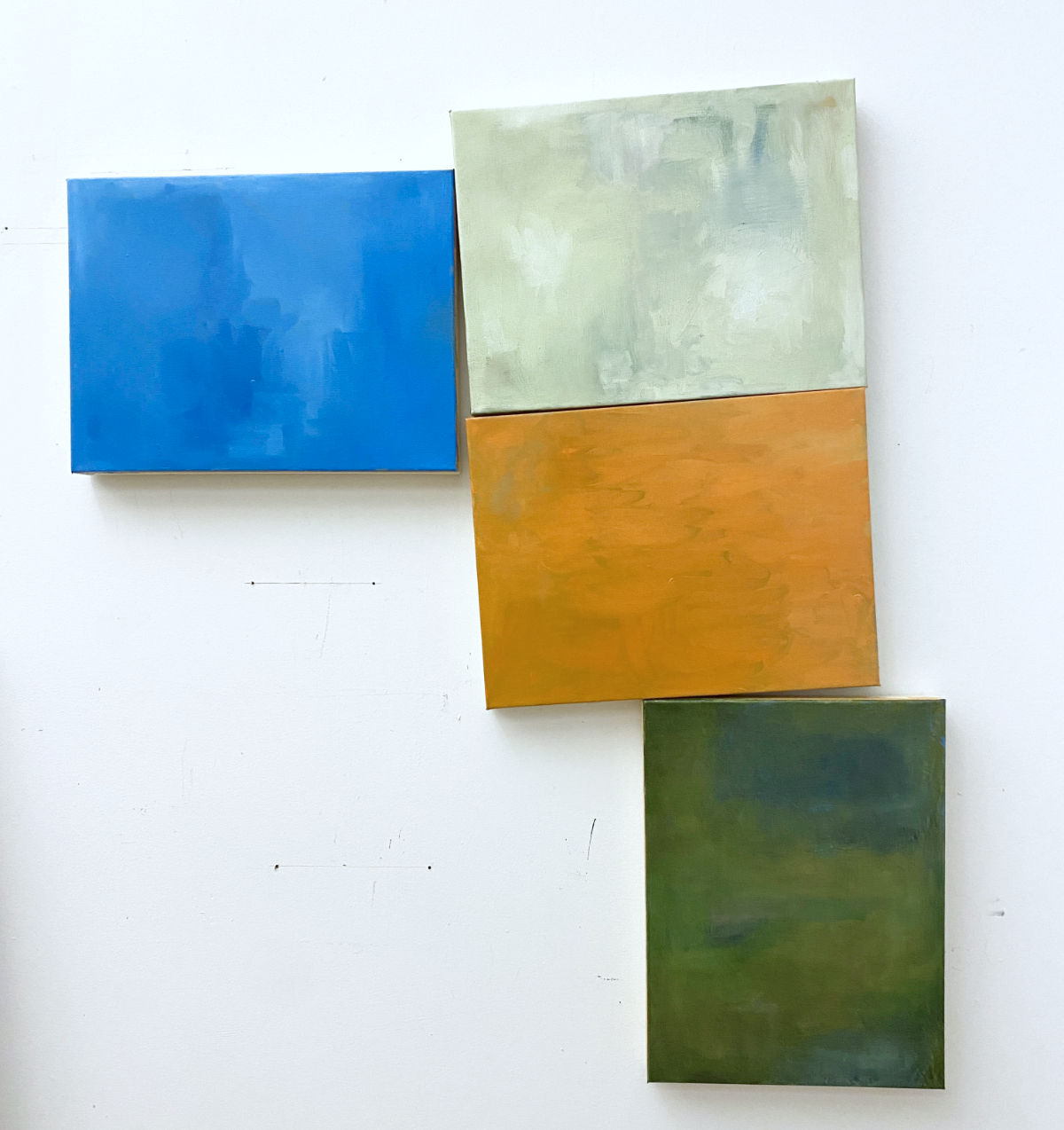
Sharon Butler, BQE, 2024, oil on canvas, four panels, 50 x 42 inches

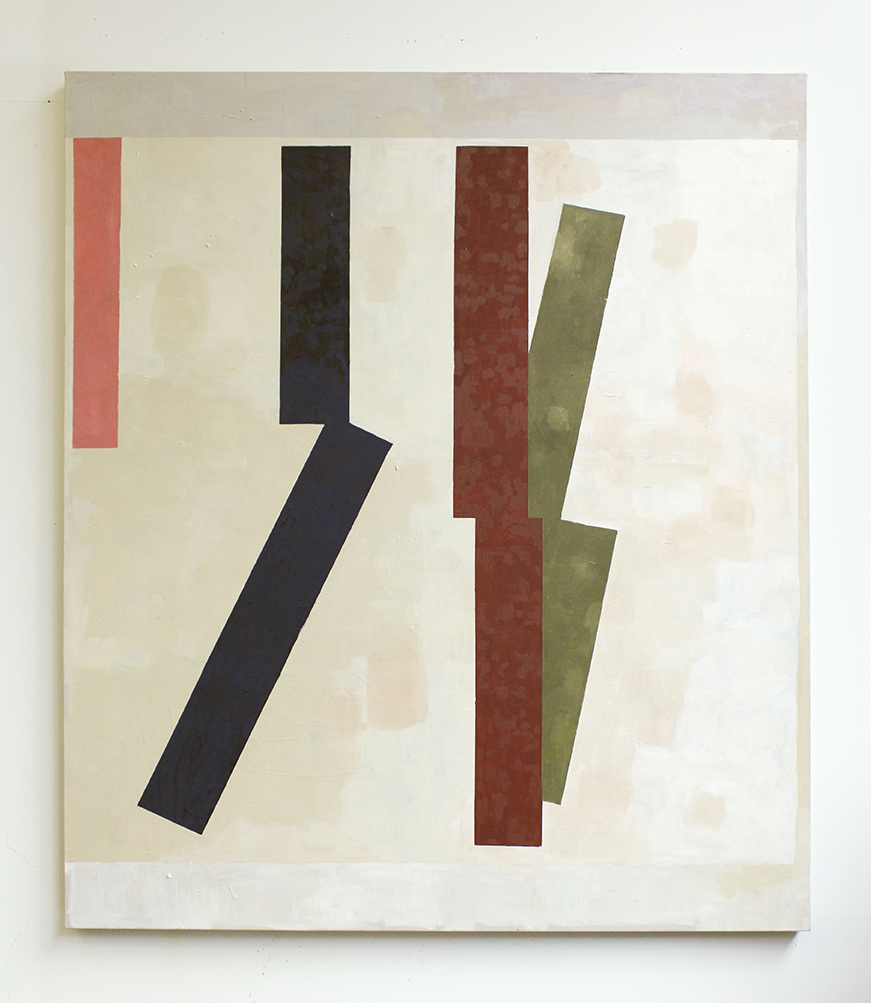
Sharon Butler, Leggy (May 29, 2018), 2020, oil on canvas, 52 x 45 inches

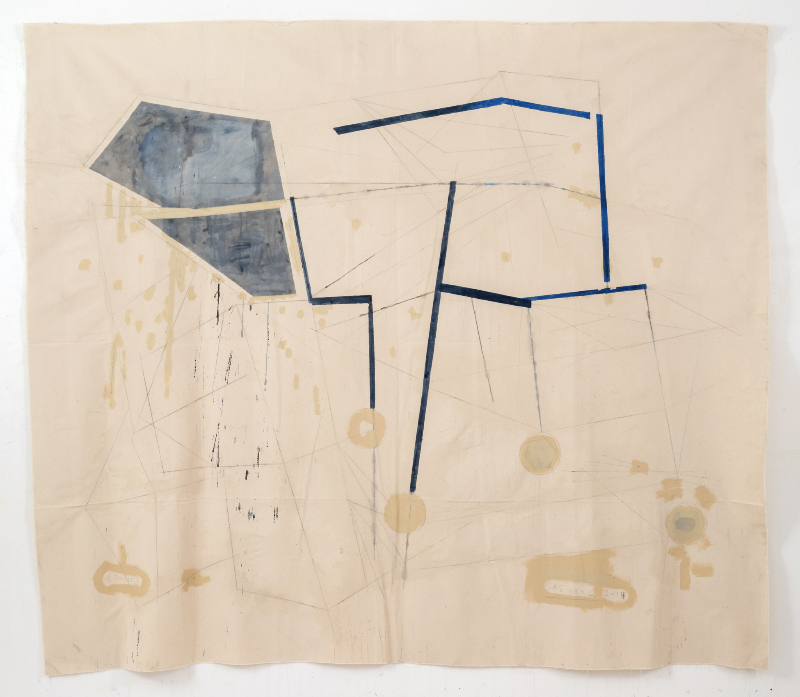
Sharon Butler, Gas Grill 2 (Bomb), 2014. pigment and binder on unstretched canvas, 72 x 84 inches

== Early life and education ==
Butler was born in New London, Connecticut, grew up in Stonington, Connecticut, and moved to New York City in the late 1980s. She has a B.A. in Art History from Tufts University (Medford, MA), a B.F.A. in Painting from Massachusetts College of Art (Boston, MA), and an M.F.A. in Art from the University of Connecticut (Storrs, CT), where she studied with Deborah Dancy, Walter McConnell.

== Exhibitions ==
Butler has shown her work internationally at galleries in Baltimore, Birmingham, Brooklyn, Boston, Chicago, Hartford, Miami, London, Los Angeles, Paris, New York, Seattle, Tuscaloosa, and other cities. In 2014, she was the inaugural resident at Counterproof Press where she published a series of etchings that foreshadowed her interest in geometric drawing.

Jennifer Baahng Gallery (New York, NY), Theodore:Art (Brooklyn, NY), Pocket Utopia (New York, NY), and SEASON (Seattle, WA) are among the galleries with which Butler has been affiliated. Her work is in collections at the William Benton Museum of Art (Storrs, CT), Eastern Connecticut State University (Willimantic CT), Southern New Hampshire University, and has been published in the Harvard Review.

== Arts writing ==
Butler is an arts writer. In 2007 she founded Two Coats of Paint, which was among the first of the professional art blogs developed by artists. Two Coats of Paint was named one of the best art blogs in New York by Time Out. It was awarded several grants, including the Creative Capital / Andy Warhol Foundation Arts Writers Grant (2013) for art blogs. The project has expanded to include a small press, curatorial projects, and an artists' residency program. Her essays have been published in The Brooklyn Rail, Gulf Coast, Huffington Post, Hyperallergic, The American Prospect, and other publications. Through her lectures and teaching, she has encouraged artists to contribute to the art community by organizing salons, residency programs, curating exhibitions, writing art criticism, and other activities that provide opportunities to other artists. She was inducted into the AICA-USA organization for art critics in 2023.

== Casualism ==
In 2011, in an essay called Abstract Painting: The New Casualists, published in The Brooklyn Rail, Butler coined the term "casualism" for a new type of abstraction that featured a self-amused, anti-heroic style with an interest in off-kilter composition and impermanence. She suggested that artists' interest in irresolution reflected wider insights about culture and society. Many younger artists responded positively to the essay, embracing the notion of "casualism," while others rejected the term, suggesting it "whiffed of 'labelism,' and 'crypto-institutionalism.'" Subsequent interviews and art reviews of Butler's own work made clear that ideas for the original article were rooted in her own painting practice and artist statement. The Casualist tendency continued to inform her work for many years, although she eventually returned to more traditional stretched-canvas formats.

== Awards and residencies ==
Butler has been awarded the Pollock Krasner Foundation Grant (1991), and the Creative Capital/ Andy Warhol Foundation Arts Writing Program Grant for Art Blogs (2013, with follow-up grant in 2016). She has also received residencies from Art21 (PBS affiliate), New York, NY (2009), Counterproof Press (2014), Yaddo (2015, 2018), and the Cultural Space Subsidy Program (2015–2018, 2019–2021, 2022- 2025). She was inducted into American Abstract Artists in 2023.
