= Tia Chucha's Centro Cultural =

Cultural center in Los Angeles, California

Coordinates: 34.3105°N 118.4281°W

Tia Chucha's Centro Cultural is a non-profit cultural center and bookstore in Sylmar, California. It was founded in 2003 by noted Chicano author Luis J. Rodriguez, his wife Trini Rodriguez, Angelica Loa, and Victor Mendoza (Victor E) of El Vuh. Tia Chucha's provides arts and music workshops and events to the culturally underserved Northeastern San Fernando Valley.

== History ==
Tia Chucha's Centro Cultural was founded in 2003 next door to Tia Chucha's Cafe Cultural, a coffee shop and bookstore owned by Chicano writer Luis Rodriguez, his wife Trini, and their brother-in-law Enrique Sanchez in Sylmar, CA since 2001. The Centro's founders were Luis Rodriguez, Angelica Loa Perez and Victor Mendoza. They began offering workshops in writing, painting, music, dance, film, theater, reiki healing, and Indigenous studies. A resident Danza Azteca group, Temachtia Quetzalcoatl, was formed, as well as natural healing circles for both men and women.

In 2005, the Centro took over operations of Tia Chucha Press and continues to produce poetry books, distributed by Northwestern University Press. Tia Chucha Press was started in 1989 by Luis Rodriguez in Chicago and since 1991 was run by the nonprofit literary arts organization, the Guild Complex, until the Centro made Tia Chucha Press its publishing wing. This complements the CD production project, Dos Manos Records, that the Centro began in 2003.

The Centro also sponsors weekly Open Mic nights as well as regular film nights, musical events, original theater, author readings, and art exhibits. Since 2006, it also created the only annual literacy & performing arts festival in the San Fernando Valley called "Celebrating Words: Written, Performed & Sung." And we sponsor an arts-based youth empowerment project called "Young Warriors," started by teen leaders Mayra Zaragoza and Brian Dessaint.

In January 2007, both the Centro and Tia Chucha's Cafe were forced out of their facility to make way for a high-end laundromat. Given the state of the real estate market at the time, the Centro had to move into a much smaller facility in nearby Lake View Terrace, and the Cafe was closed. In March of that year, the Centro took over the bookstore operation from the Cafe.

That summer the Centro established an annual benefit event called "Celebrating Community & Culture: Si Se Puede/Yes We Can!" at Hollywood's Ford Amphitheatre with such notables as Cheech Marin, John Densmore of the Doors, Charles Wright & the Watts 103rd Street Rhythm Band, El Vuh, Xela, Tierra, Upground, Olmeca, Nobuko Miyamoto, and more.

The board also expanded to include leaders in the Chicano, African American, Asian, and European American communities.

By February 2009, Tia Chucha's Centro Cultural & Bookstore leased another space back in Sylmar at the Sylmar Plaza on Hubbard Boulevard and Gladstone Avenue, down the street from Mission Community College. The Centro is now the only multi-arts cultural space and bookstore in the Northeast San Fernando Valley, with some 450,000 people, mostly Mexican/Central American—the second largest Latino community in the United States after East LA (with a sizable African American and growing Asian communities).

The Centro has so far been funded by the LA City Department of Cultural Affairs, the LA County Arts Commission, the California Arts Council, the National Endowment for the Arts, the City of San Fernando, the Liberty Hill Foundation, the Panta Rhea Foundation, the Attias Family Foundation, the Middleton Foundation, the Center for Cultural Innovation, Toyota Sales, among others.

Individual donors have included Bruce Springsteen, John Densmore of the Doors, Lou Adler, Richard Foos, Adrienne Rich, Tom Hayden, Jack Kornfield, David Sandoval, Jesus Trevino, Denise Chavez and the Border Book Festival, Dave Marsh, and the Luis & Trini Rodriguez Family.

== Projects ==
=== Tia Chucha Press ===
Founded in Chicago in 1989 by Luis Rodriguez, Tia Chucha Press has published around 50 poetry collections, anthologies, chapbooks and a CD by a wide range of poets including President Obama Inaugural Poet Elizabeth Alexander, Patricia Smith, Ricardo Sanchez, Terrance Hayes, Tony Fitzpatrick, Lisa Buscani, Diane Glancy, Nick Carbo, Denise Duhamel & Maureen Seaton, Ariel Robello, Virgil Suarez, Kyoko Mori, Patricia Spears Jones, Linda Susan Jackson, Alfred Arteaga, Richard Vargas, and Xochiquetzal Candelaria. Tia Chucha Poets include Pulitzer and National Book Award nominees, National Poetry Slam Champions, and winners of Whiting, Lannan, National Endowment for the Arts, and Lila Wallace-Reader's Digest fellowships and awards, among others. In 1991, the Press became a project of the Guild Complex, a nonprofit literary arts center in Chicago. Tia Chucha's Centro Cultural took over operations of the Press in 2005. Tia Chucha Press books are distributed by Northwestern University Press and sold at all major independent and chain bookstores as well as online outlets like Amazon.com.

=== Dos Manos Records ===
Founded by Luis Rodriguez in 2002, Dos Manos Records became a project of Tia Chucha's Centro Cultural the following year. Dos Manos has released two CDs: From Earth To Sky: A Collection of Word & Song, a showcase of musicians and spoken word artists from the greater Los Angeles area, and My Name's Not Rodriguez, featuring Rodriguez reading his poetry accompanied by the music of Ernie Perez with the band, Seven Rabbit. Both are available at CD Baby online store.

=== Young Warriors ===
Founded in 2007, Young Warriors is the Centro's ongoing youth empowerment group. Founded by Mayra Zaragoza, Young Warriors utilizes the arts, dialogue, and Indigenous healing practices to help troubled young people. Members have taken part in Mosaic Multicultural Foundation's Men's Conferences, Sisters of the Earth Women's Conferences, and the Koures Youth Symposium, among other events. Issues of gangs, drugs, social issues, the arts, and how to live healthy, whole and dignified lives are discussed. A large mural in collaboration with the LA Mural Project, and several young graffiti artists, was painted in 2008 at an elementary school in Sylmar, CA, among other initiatives.

== Major events ==
=== Celebrating Words: Written, Spoken and Sung ===
Begun in 2006, "Celebrating Words: Written, Performed & Sung" is Tia Chucha's Centro's annual outdoor community festival, held each summer in Sylmar. The only literacy & performing arts festival in Los Angeles' City Council District 7, it features musicians, bands, spoken word artists, theater performers, and dance troupes, as well as an array of local vendors, including Tia Chucha's bookstore. Sponsors have included the LA City Department of Cultural Affairs, Center for Cultural Innovation, Youth Policy Institute, the Mayor's Office, LA County Supervisor Zev Yaroslavksy, Councilpersons Richard Alarcon and Tony Cardenas, California State Senator Alex Padilla, State Assemblyman Felipe Fuentes, among others.

=== Tia Chucha's Celebration of Community and Culture ===
Starting in 2007, Tia Chucha's has produced an annual benefit concert at the John Anson Ford Amphitheatre in Hollywood. The 2007 concert featured John Densmore (of The Doors), Culture Clash, Tierra, Upground, El Vuh, Xela, Luis Rodriguez, Ollin, among others. The 2008 show included Charles Wright & the Watts 103rd Street Rhythm Band, Cheech Marin, Nobuko Miyamoto, Opening People's Minds, Olmeca, and Upground. Tia Chucha's resident Azteca Danza group, Temachtia Quetzacoatl, opened for both events. And Latino Comedian Ernie G. served as host.
