= Cynthia Cruz =

American poet

Cynthia Cruz is a contemporary American poet. She has published nine poetry collections, two works of cultural criticism, and a novel. She has taught at Sarah Lawrence College, the University of Massachusetts-Amherst, and Columbia University.

== Early life and education ==
Born in Wiesbaden, Germany, Cruz grew up in Germany and in northern California.

She earned her B.A. at Mills College. She earned her MFA in poetry at Sarah Lawrence College, an MFA in Art Writing & Criticism at the School of Visual Arts, an MA in German Language and Literature at Rutgers University-New Brunswick, and a PhD in Philosophy at the European Graduate School, where her research focused on Hegel and madness.

== Work ==
Cruz has published nine poetry collections. Her first collection, Ruin, was published by Alice James Books in 2006 and reviewed by The New York Times Sunday Book Review, Library Journal, and Publishers Weekly, where it received a starred review. Her second collection, The Glimmering Room, was published by Four Way Books and launched at the contemporary art gallery Hansel and Gretel Picture Garden; it was also reviewed by The New York Times alongside the poet C. K. Williams. Her third collection, Wunderkammer, was published in 2014 by Four Way Books. How the End Begins was published in 2016, Dregs, in 2018, and Guidebooks for the Dead in 2020. Her books have been reviewed widely. Her seventh collection of poems, Hotel Oblivion, published in 2022, won the National Book Critics Circle Award and was also a finalist for the Kingsley Tufts Award. Back to the Woods was published in 2023 and Sweet Repetition in 2025.

She has published poems in numerous literary journals and magazines, including BOMB Magazine, The New Yorker, AGNI, The American Poetry Review, Boston Review, Denver Quarterly, Guernica, and The Paris Review, and in anthologies including Isn't It Romantic: 100 Love Poems by Younger Poets (Wave Books, 2004), and The Iowa Anthology of New American Poetries, edited by poet Reginald Shepherd (University of Iowa Press, 2004). She is the recipient of fellowships from Yaddo and the MacDowell Colony as well as a Hodder Followship from Princeton University.

In spring of 2019 Disquieting: Essays on Silence, a collection of critical essays, was published by Book*hug. A second collection of cultural criticism, The Melancholia of Class, was published by Repeater Books in 2021. In 2023, Four Way Books published Cruz’s debut novel, Steady Diet of Nothing.

Cruz is editor, with the visual artist, Steven Page, of the interdisciplinary journal, Schlag Magazine.
