= David Levi Strauss =

American art critic (born 1953)

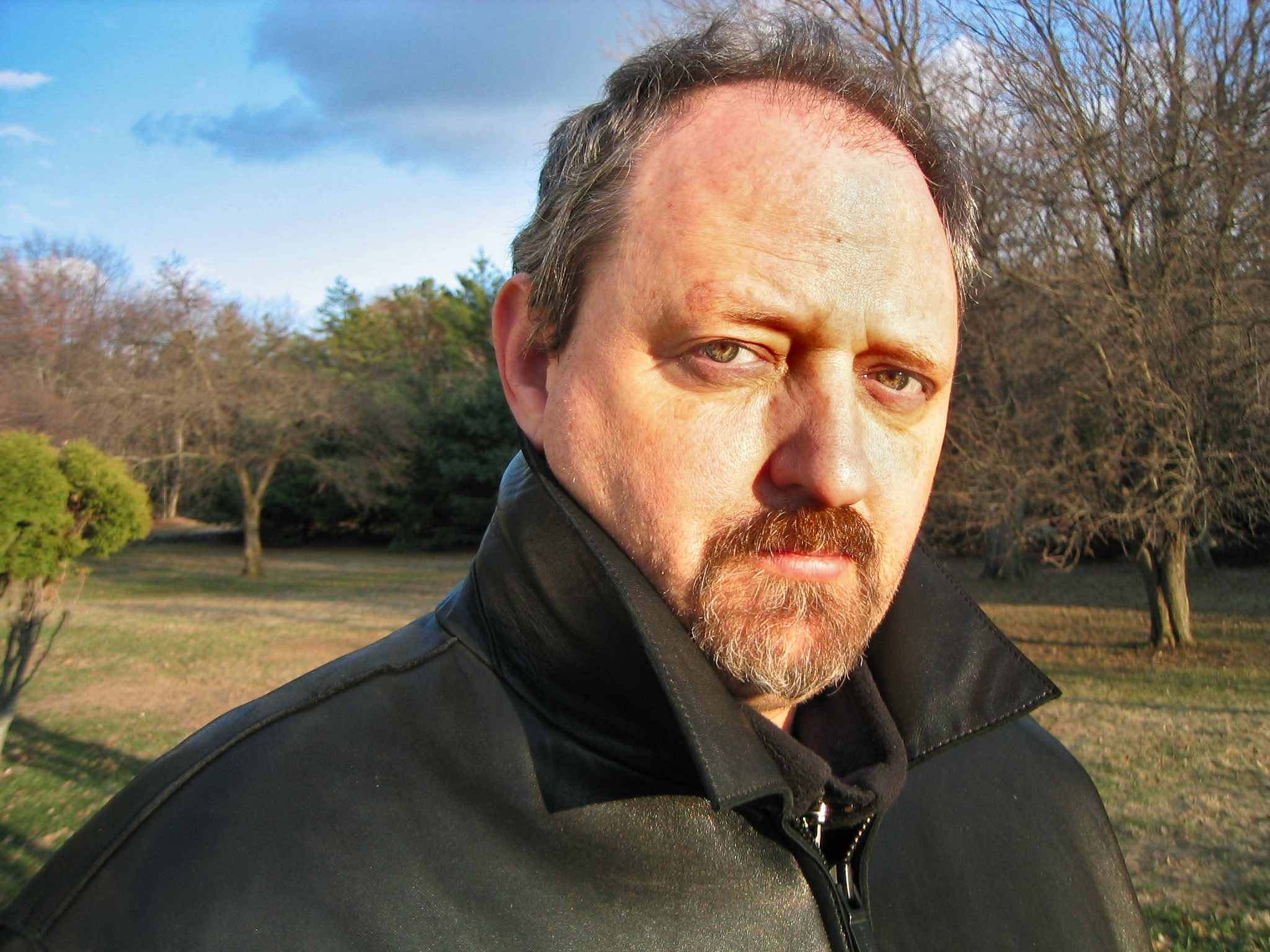
- Born: March 10, 1953 (age 73); Junction City, Kansas
- Citizenship: U.S.
- Education: Kansas State University; Goddard College (B.A.); Poetics Program, New College of California.
- Alma mater: Visual Studies Workshop in Rochester, New York.
- Occupation: Writer
- Spouse: Gret Sterrett Smith
- Children: Maya Grace Strauss
- Writing career
- Genres: Art and Cultural Critic, Essayist, Memoirist and Poet
- Notable works: Between The Eyes: Essays on Photography and Politics, Photography and Belief (2020), Co-Illusion (2020)
- Notable awards: Guggenheim Fellowship (2003), Infinity Award for Writing from the International Center of Photography (2007).
- Website: davidlevistrauss.com

David Levi Strauss (born March 10, 1953, in Junction City, Kansas) is an American art and cultural critic, essayist, poet, and educator. He is the author of a book of poetry, six books of essays, and numerous monographs and catalogues on artists, as well as a book on the rise of Donald Trump and the subsequent changes in the communication environment, and a book of photographic theory. He was Chair of the graduate program in Art Writing (formerly Art Criticism & Writing) at the School of Visual Arts in New York City from 2007 until that program closed in 2021. He also taught at the Center for Curatorial Studies at Bard College from 2001 to 2005, and in the Milton Avery Graduate School of the Arts at Bard from 2002 to 2023.

Strauss' principal subject in his books of essays has been the relation between aesthetics and politics.

Strauss' critiques and theories about the role and influence of art and photography on society are frequently cited in the works of other contemporary writers and critics.

== Life and work ==
David Levi Strauss was born in Junction City, Kansas in 1953, and grew up just down the road in Chapman, where his grandfather was a blacksmith and his father a mechanic. His mother, Viola Lee, worked as a secretary for the local school district.

After writing and distributing a political tract critical of his high school's administration, he was threatened with expulsion, but enrolled in Kansas State University anyway, where he spent two years studying political science and philosophy before being asked to leave after organizing a march on the ROTC building to protest Nixon's Cambodian bombings in 1973 and a student strike to protest the firing of a radical history professor. At age 21, he traveled around the world on a floating university, collecting children's art in Japan, China, Indonesia, India, and Africa, and studying the radical pedagogy of Paulo Freire. After returning to the U.S., he studied philosophy and photography at Goddard College in Vermont, graduating with a B.A. in 1976, and studied photography and language with Nathan Lyons at Visual Studies Workshop in Rochester, New York.

In 1978 he moved to San Francisco, where he studied in the Poetics Program at New College of California with poets Robert Duncan, Diane Di Prima, Michael Palmer, David Meltzer, and Duncan McNaughton, from 1980 to 1985, and edited and published ACTS: A Journal of New Writing (1982-1990). ACTS published books on Analytic Lyric (1987), Jack Spicer (1987) and Paul Celan (1988), all co-edited with Benjamin Hollander. ACTS was funded by Strauss' work as Robert Duncan's gardener, and printed with the mimeograph Duncan used to print "Dante Etudes."

In 1993 Strauss left San Francisco for New York, where he currently resides in the Hudson Valley and in New York City with his wife, the painter Gret Sterrett Smith. Their daughter, Maya Grace Strauss, also a painter, graduated with honors from The Cooper Union for the Advancement of Science and Art in New York in 2012, and earned an MFA in Painting from the Yale School of Art in 2018.

In December 2014, Strauss was interviewed by Wired on the Obama administration's refusal to release photographs of torture at Abu Ghraib, which Strauss had been writing about since 2004. He told the interviewer, "I want more images. In that way, I guess you could say I have gotten what I want, since today's communications environment makes more and more images available to us all the time."

== Recognition ==
Strauss received a Guggenheim Fellowship in 2003–04, and the Infinity Award for Writing from the International Center of Photography in 2007. The selection committee for the latter wrote, "His special perspective on ways of seeing has shaped our understanding of the changing nature of visual media."

== Books ==
- In 1980, the poet Diane di Prima published Strauss's first book of poetry, Manoeuvres: Poems 1977-79 under her Eidolon Editions imprint, in San Francisco.
- Dispatches: In Lieu of News January 16–26, 1991. Self-published artist's book of media collages in response to the First Gulf War.
- In 1997, Broken Wings: The Legacy of Landmines, with photographs from Cambodia and Mozambique by Bobby Adams, was published by the Greenville County Museum of Art. Adams and Strauss spent time in Cambodia together doing research for the book. The epigraph was from Jean Genet's Prisoner of Love: "Panic is really the word, and I should write it quickly, for it was that which made legs run of their own accord, fleeing not death but the unexpected."
- In 1999, Autonomedia, the anarchist collective in Brooklyn, published a book of Strauss's essays, Between Dog & Wolf: Essays on Art & Politics in the Twilight of the Millennium. The book was reprinted by Autonomedia in 2010, with a new prolegomenon by Hakim Bey. "In these fierce and lyrical essays, Strauss calls for an art—and implicitly for an approach to art writing—that is passionately experiential, intellectually grounded, and politically fearless. Anyone looking for a space of cultural possibility in this moment of complicity and collusion should start here." (Michael Brenson). ISBN 978-1-57027-093-2
- In 2000, The Fighting is a Dance Too was published in a limited edition with works by Leon Golub and Nancy Spero by Roth Horowitz Gallery in New York. This led to an intense friendship and further collaborations with Golub and Spero. ISBN 0-9670774-2-7
- In 2003, Between the Eyes: Essays on Photography and Politics was published by Aperture, in New York, with an introduction by John Berger. The first paperback edition was released in 2005, and the second in 2012. It was published in an Italian edition, as Politica della Fotografia, by Postmedia Books in Milan, in 2007, translated by Gianni Romano. "Strauss, who is a poet and storyteller as well as being a renowned commentator on photography (I reject the designation critic) looks at images very hard. That's to say he studies them for a long while before allowing words to come into his mind. The unexplained he encounters has only little to do with the mystery of art and everything to do with the mystery of countless lives being lived." (John Berger's Introduction) ISBN 978-1-59711-214-7
- In 2010, Oxford University Press in London and New York published a collection of essays on art titled From Head to Hand: Art and the Manual. The book includes essays on the artworks of Martin Puryear, Joseph Beuys, Cecilia Vicuña, Leon Golub and Nancy Spero, and the writings of Robert Duncan, Guy Davenport, John Berger, and Leo Steinberg. ISBN 978-0-19-539122-0
- In 2012, Documenta 13 in Kassel, Germany published In Case Something Different Happens in the Future: Joseph Beuys & 9/11 as a little book, in English and German (translated by Gerrit Jackson), in their "100 Notes—100 Thoughts" series, edited by Bettina Funke (Kassel, Germany: Documenta 13/Hatje Cantz, 2012). This is volume 72. ISBN 978-3-7757-2921-5, 33 pp. with three illustrations, plus an e-book version, ISBN 978-3-7757-3101-0
- In 2014, Aperture published Words Not Spent Today Buy Smaller Images Tomorrow: Essays on the Present and Future of Photography, including essays on Susan Meiselas, Sally Mann, Carolee Schneemann, Jenny Holzer, Jane Hammond, Frederick Sommer, Robert Bergman, Susan Sontag, Larry Clark, Daido Moriyama, Helen Levitt, Chris Marker, and many others. ISBN 978-1-59711-271-0
- In 2016, Autonomedia published To Dare Imagining: Rojava Revolution, edited by David Levi Strauss, Peter Lamborn Wilson, Michael Taussig, and Dilar Dirik, on the revolution in Syrian Kurdistan, i.e. Rojava. "The Rojava Revolution has identified the State itself—nationalism, hegemony, and patriarchal power—as the force to be overthrown." In 2017, an Italian edition, Rojava: una democrazia senza Stato, was published by Elèuthera in Milan, translated by Claudia Campisano. ISBN 978-1-57027-312-4
- The Critique of the Image Is the Defense of the Imagination, edited by David Levi Strauss, Peter Lamborn Wilson, and Michael Taussig, and also including work by Carolee Schneemann, Robert Kelly, Diane di Prima, Chuck Stein, Chris Bamford, Gerrit Lansing, and two unpublished essays by Ivan Illich, was published by Autonomedia in 2020, with a cover by Richard Serra. ISBN 978-1-57027-370-4
- Also in 2020, a little book of photographic theory, Photography and Belief, was published by David Zwirner Books as part of their ekphrasis series, overseen by Lucas Zwirner. The next year, 2021, an Italian edition of the book, Perché crediamo alle immagini fotografiche, was published by Johan & Levi Editore in Milan, translated by Federico Florian. ISBN 978-1-64423-047-3
- In 2020, The MIT Press published Co-Ilusion: Dispatches from the End of Communication with photographs by Susan Meiselas and Peter van Agtmael. "As through a glass darkly, the crackling pages of these daily dispatches testify to the terrifying future that is now upon us." (Michael Taussig) ISBN 978-0-262-04354-0
