= Mei-mei Berssenbrugge =

American poet (born 1947)

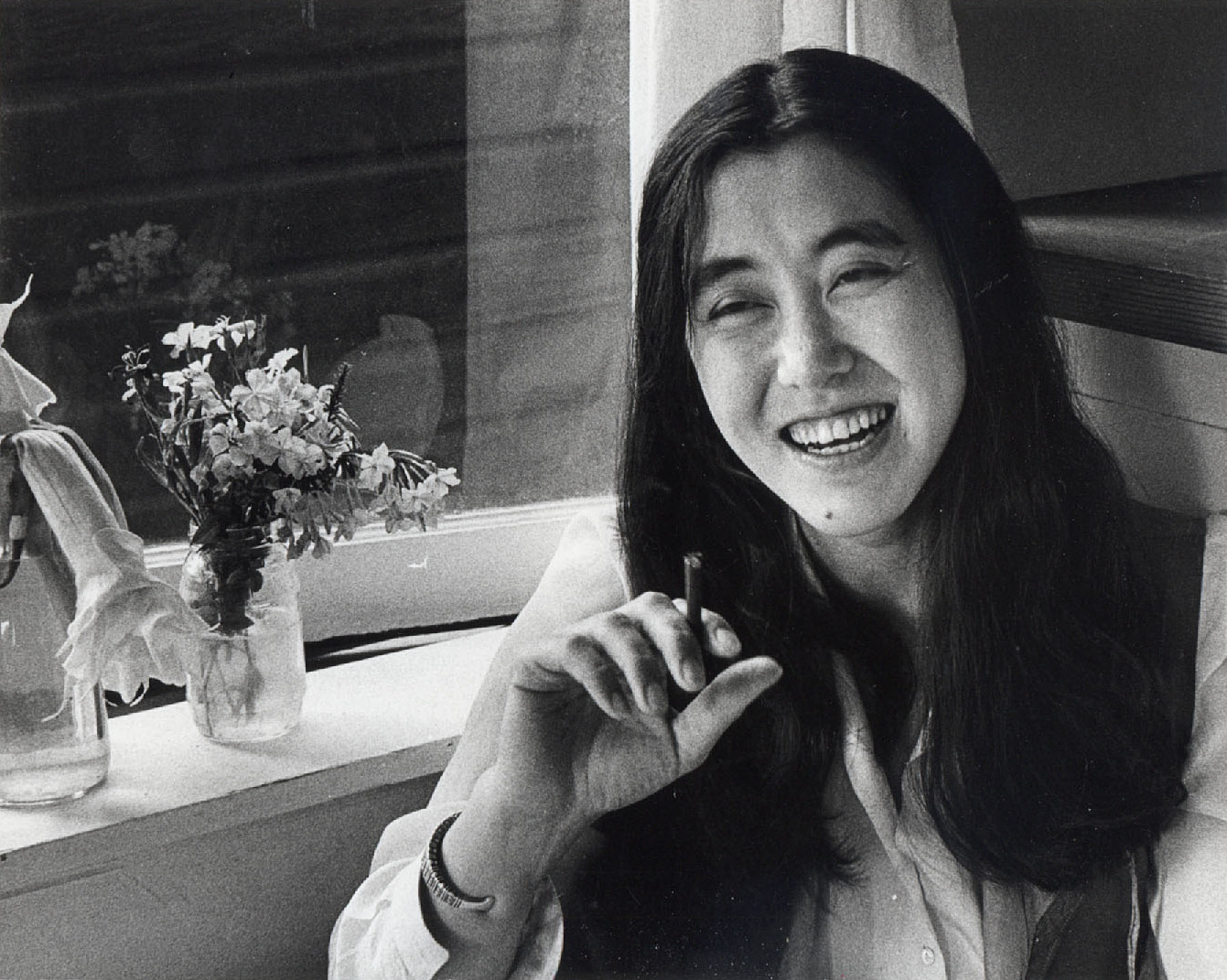
- Berssenbrugge in 1975
- Born: Bái Xuānhuá (白萱华); 5 October 1947 (age 79); Beiping, Republic of China
- Education: Reed College (BA); Columbia University (MFA)
- Occupation: Poet
- Spouse: Richard Tuttle
- Children: Martha Tuttle
- Relatives: Annie Berssenbrugge (sister); Laura Berssenbrugge (niece)

Chinese name
- Simplified Chinese: 白萱华
Transcriptions
Standard Mandarin
- Hanyu Pinyin: Bái Xuānhuá

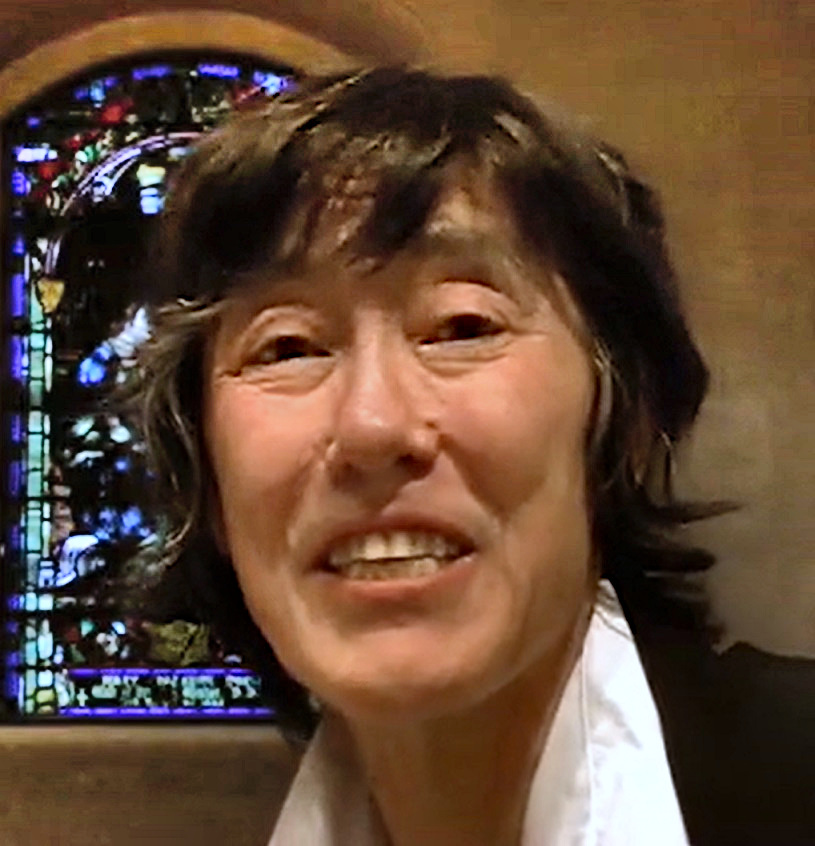
Mei-mei Berssenbrugge circa 2004

Mei-mei Berssenbrugge (Chinese: 白萱华; pinyin: Bái Xuānhuá; born October 5, 1947, in Beijing, China) is a contemporary Chinese American poet. Winner of two American Book Awards, her work is often associated with the Language School, the poetry of the New York School, phenomenology, and visual art. She is the 2026 recipient of the Frost Medal for distinguished lifetime achievement in poetry.

== Early life and education ==
Berssenbrugge was born in Beijing to Chinese and Dutch American parents. Her mother was an educated mathematician, and her American father was born to first-generation Dutch emigrants. She grew up near Boston, Massachusetts.

Berssenbrugge was educated starting at Barnard College of Columbia University. Afterward, she transferred to Reed College, where she earned a B.A. in 1969. She then attended Columbia University, completing her M.F.A. from Columbia in 1973, before settling in rural northern New Mexico.

== Poetry ==
After receiving her degree, Berssenbrugge became active in the multicultural poetry movement of the 1970s, together with her friends Leslie Marmon Silko, and Ishmael Reed, with theater director Frank Chin, and political reformer Kathleen Chang. Berssenbrugge became a teacher at the Institute of American Indian Arts in Santa Fe, New Mexico.

Traveling frequently to New York City, Berssenbrugge became engaged in the rich cultural flourishing of the abstract art movement, and was influenced by New York School poets John Ashbery, Barbara Guest, James Schuyler and Anne Waldman, and then the Language poets, including Charles Bernstein, as well as artist Susan Bee. She later joined the contributing editorial board for the literary journal Conjunctions.

Berssenbrugge's poetry is known for its mix of philosophical meditation and personal experience, and for moving quickly between abstract language and the concrete particulars of immediate perception. Her poems often contain subtle shifts of grammar and perspective, and Berssenbrugge often works with collage to produce unexpected juxtapositions. Her work is also known for its exploration of the complexities of cultural and political identity, an interest informed by her own experience of cultural and linguistic displacement.

=== Fish Souls ===
Fish Souls is Berssenbrugge's first published collection of poems. It was published by Greenwood Press in 1971. Only 100 numbered copies were published. Information about this volume is scarce.

=== Summits Move with the Tide ===
Summits Move with the Tide, subtitled (on the cover of the second edition) Poems and a Play, is Berssenbrugge's second collection of poems. It was published by the Greenfield Review Press in 1974, and later in 1982. The acknowledgments page indicates that some of the poems previously appeared in First Issue, Intro 3, East-West Journal, Cathedral, Ash Tree, Gidra, and Greenwood Press. In contrast to her later books, most of the poems in the collection are short, with only a few carrying over to new pages. Additionally, only two poems are broken into numbered stanzas, a format Berssenbrugge would use in later poems. The poems in the collection are organized into four groups: three groups of poems, and one play, One, Two Cups.

The book contains the following poems:

Group 1: "Aegean"; "Finn Song to the Bear Ghosts"; "Bog"; "Book of the Dead, Prayer"; "El Bosco"; "Spirit"; "Hopi Basketweaver Song"; "Beetle Is Born, Lives ..."; "Los Sangre de Cristos"; "In Bhaudanath"; "Snow Mountains"; "Red Backs & Autumn Leaves ..."; and "Ghost".

Group 2: "Old Man Let's Go Fishing In ..."; "Travelling [sic] Through Your Country"; "Propeller Sleep"; "Fish & Swimmers & Lonely Birds ..."; "Spaces Are Death"; "The Second Moment"; "The Third Moment"; "Perpetual Motions"; "Leaving Your Country"; "The Old Know by Midsummer"; and "Abortion".

Group 3: "Written Before Easter in New York"; "Chronicle"; "Tracks"; "On the Winter Solstice"; "Blossom"; "Hudson Ice Floes"; "Poor Mouse"; "Sky"; and "March Wind".

Group 4: The play, One, Two Cups.

=== Random Possession ===
Random Possession was published by I. Reed Books in 1982. On the contents page the poems are separated spatially into five unnumbered groups (with only the first three listed on the contents page). The pagination bears out the scheme, with one empty page between the groups. The book contains the following poems:

Group 1: "Chronicle".

Group 2: "The Membrane"; "Rabbit, Hair, Leaf"; "On the Mountain with the Deer"; "The Suspension Bridge"; "Numbers of the Date Become the Names of Birds"; "Spring Street Bar"; "Heat Wave"; "The Intention of Two Rivers"; "For The Tails of Comets"; and "Sleep".

Group 3: "The Field for Blue Corn"; "The Reservoir"; "The White Beaver"; "Breaking the Circumference"; "A Deer Listening"; "You and You"; and "Goodbye, Goodbye".

Group 4: "The Scientific Method (for Walter)"; "Walter Calls It a Dream Screen"; "The Constellation Quilt"; "Run-off and Silt"; "The Translation of Verver"; and "Commentary".

Group 5: "Tail".

=== The Heat Bird ===
In The Heat Bird, Berssenbrugge shifted to a long-verse format. The book contains only four poems, all several pages long and broken into numbered stanzas: "Pack Rat Sieve"; "Farolita"; "Ricochet Off Water"; and "The Heat Bird". The verso indicates that some of the poems in the book were previously published in Conjunctions, Contact II, Roof, and Telephone.

=== Empathy ===
Empathy was published by Station Hill Press in 1989, and contains three numbered groups of poems. The verso indicates that some of the poems appeared in Bridge, Calaban, Conjunctions, Parnassus, Temblor, and Tyuonyi. The book is dedicated to Bradford Morrow and Sheffield Van Buren, and contains the following poems:

Group 1: "The Blue Taj"; "Tan Tien"; "Alakanak Break-Up"; "Texas"; "Duration of Water"; "The Star Field"; and "Chinese Space".

Group 2: "Jealousy"; "Recitative"; "The Carmelites"; "The Margin"; "Naturalism"; and "Fog".

Group 3: "War Insurance"; "Empathy"; "The Swan"; "Forms of Politeness"; and "Honeymoon".

=== Sphericity ===
Sphericity was published by Kelsey Street Press in 1993, and was her second collaboration with Richard Tuttle. The first edition of Sphericity was limited to 2000 copies, with the first 50 signed by Berssenbrugge and Tuttle and hand-colored by Tuttle. The book consists of six long poems, all with several numbered stanzas: "Ideal"; "Size"; "Combustion"; "Sphericity"; "Experience"; and "Value".

=== Endocrinology ===
Endocrinology is an artists' book poem made in collaboration with visual artist Kiki Smith. Forty copies were produced by Universal Limited Art Editions from a maquette made by Berssenbrugge and Smith. The Kelsey Street Press edition, a facsimile of the original book, was limited to 2,000 copies, with the first 60 signed and numbered.

== Personal life ==
Berssenbrugge is married to the painter Richard Tuttle, with whom she has frequently collaborated.

== Awards ==
- 1976 National Endowment for the Arts Fellowship.
- 1980 American Book Award for Random Possession.
- 1981 National Endowment for the Arts Fellowship.
- 1984 American Book Award for The Heat Bird.
- 1990 National Endowment for the Arts Award.
- 1990 PEN West Award for Empathy.
- 1998 Asian American Literary Award for Endocrinology.
- 1999 Western States Book Award for Four Year Old Girl.
- 2004 Asian American Literary Award for Nest.
- 2026 Frost Medal, awarded by the Poetry Society of America for lifetime achievement in poetry.

== Work ==
=== Poetry ===
- Fish Souls. New York: Greenwood Press. 1971
- Summits Move with the Tide. Greenfield Review Press. 1974. ISBN 0-912678-56-9. Other ISBN 978-0-912678-15-3.
- Random Possession. I. Reed Books. 1979. ISBN 0-918408-13-X. Other ISBN 978-0-918408-13-6;
- The Heat Bird. Burning Deck Press. 1983. ISBN 0-930901-02-9. Other ISBN I0930901037; 0930901037; 9780930901035
- Hiddenness. New York : Library Fellows of the Whitney Museum of American Art. 1987 (A collaboration with Richard Tuttle)
- Empathy. Barrytown, NY: Station Hill Press. 1989
- Mizu. Tucson, AZ: Chax Press. 1990
- Sphericity. Berkeley, CA: Kelsey Street Press. 1993. ISBN 0-932716-30-X. Other ISBNs: 9780932716309; 0932716318; 9780932716316 (A collaboration with Richard Tuttle)
- Endocrinology. Berkeley, CA: Kelsey Street Press. 1997. ISBN 0-932716-41-5. Other ISBNs: 0932716423 (Limited Edition) (A collaboration with Kiki Smith)
- Four Year Old Girl. Berkeley, CA: Kelsey Street Press, 1998
- Nest. Berkeley, CA: Kelsey Street Press. 2003. ISBN 978-0-932716-63-7.
- Concordance. Berkeley, CA: Kelsey Street Press. 2006. ISBN 978-0-932716-67-5. (A collaboration with Kiki Smith)
- I Love Artists: New and Selected Poems. University of California Press. 2006. ISBN 978-0-520-24602-7.
- Hello, the Roses. New York: New Directions, 2013. ISBN 978-0-8112-2091-0.
- A Treatise on Stars. New York: New Directions, 2020. ISBN 978-0-8112-2938-8.

=== Plays ===
- One, Two Cups, directed by Frank Chin, and published in 1974 in Summits Move With the Tide.
- Kindness (1994), commissioned by the Ford Foundation and staged at the Center for Contemporary Arts in Santa Fe with the collaboration of Richard Tuttle, Tan Dun, and Chen Shi Zheng.

=== Chapbooks ===
- Pack Rat Sieve. New York. Contact II, 1983.

=== Broadsides ===
- The Mouse 5. IE Poetry Broadside Series Two, Clayton Fine Books, 2006. "Issued in an edition of 25 copies of which 20 copies are for sale."

=== Magazines and journals ===
- Berssenbrugge, Mei-mei. The Mouse, Conjunctions, Number 48, Spring 2007.

=== Anthologies ===
- Claudia Rankine; Juliana Spahr, eds. (2002). "From Four Year Old Girl". American women poets in the 21st century: where lyric meets language. Wesleyan University Press. ISBN 978-0-8195-6547-1.
- John Ashbery; David Lehman, eds. (1988). The Best American Poetry, 1988. Macmillan. ISBN 978-0-02-044181-6.
