= Phong Bui =

American artist, writer and curator

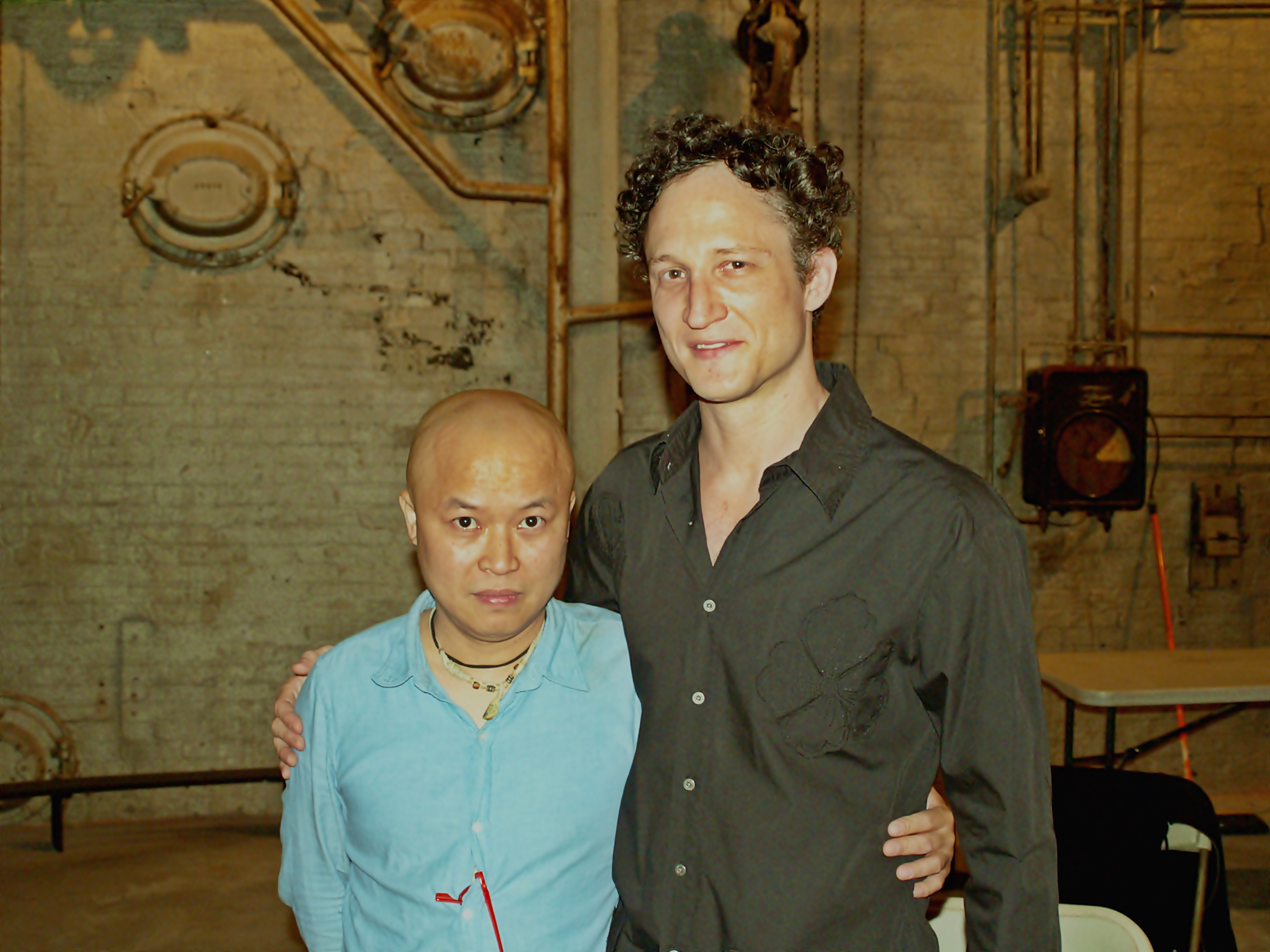
Phong Bui and novelist John Reed at a reading of Reed's Tales of Woe

Phong H. Bui (born September 17, 1964, in Huế, Vietnam) is an artist, writer, independent curator, and Co-Founder and Artistic Director of The Brooklyn Rail, a free monthly arts, culture, and politics journal. Bui was named one of the "100 Most Influential People in Brooklyn Culture" by Brooklyn Magazine in 2014. In 2015, The New York Observer called him a "ringmaster" of the "Kings County art world." Bui was the recipient of the 2021 American Academy of Arts and Letters Award for Distinguished Service to the Arts. He lives in Greenpoint, Brooklyn.

== Publisher, writer, and editor ==
In addition to fostering the creative energy behind The Brooklyn Rail, Bui publishes Rail Editions, a venture that features experimental poetry, fiction, artist interviews, and art criticism, and has published titles on artist Ron Gorchov, art critic Irving Sandler, poet Luigi Ballerini, and a collection of poems by Florbela Espanca, the first collection of the Portuguese modernist poet to appear in English.

Bui contributes essays, reviews, and interviews to the Brooklyn Rail, and creates portraits of each month's featured interviewees. He has written articles for Matador Magazine, Art in America, and Riot of Perfume, among others, as well as essays for exhibition catalogues and books on artists. In addition to his writing, he is the producer and host of the program Off The Rail, hosted by Clocktower Productions's Clocktower Radio, where he interviews artists, art historians, and art writers.

In 2018, Bui launched the River Rail, a biannual publication devoted to the environment, climate change, and the "urgent subject of nature: its beauty, abuse, and changing climate that is gravely affecting every aspect of the planet’s ecosystem, and our lives."

== Curator ==
Bui has curated over 50 monographic and group shows since 2000, including the first anniversary commemoration in 2013 of Hurricane Sandy: Come Together: Surviving Sandy, Year 1, "a sprawling, encompassing, inspiring exhibition of works by some 300 artists," according to Roberta Smith of the New York Times. The show was ranked as New York's #1 exhibition in 2013 by Jerry Saltz of New York Magazine. In 2013 he initiated the Rail Curatorial Projects which aims to curate exhibitions as social experiments. In 2014, Bui curated Bloodflames Revisited which featured the work of more than two dozen artists at Paul Kasmin Gallery and Spaced Out: Migration to the Interior at Red Bull Studios, featuring nearly 40 artists. In 2015, Bui organized a two-part exhibition entitled Intimacy in Discourse: Reasonable and Unreasonable Sized Paintings taking place at both Mana Contemporary and the SVA Chelsea Gallery. His most recent curatorial project was a two-part exhibition with Mana Contemporary in 2017, titled Occupy Mana: Artists Need To Create On the Same Scale That Society Has the Capacity To Destroy & Friends In Solidarity, Year 1. This exhibit included over 60 artists addressing social and political issues, including human rights and equality, immigration, foreign relations, the environment, and climate change, and continued Bui's curatorial activation of Peter Lamborn Wilson's concept of the Temporary Autonomous Zone, "a space wherein the fluctuation of artistic energy establishes the flow of information, and in so doing aligns—however fleetingly—a great collective imagination. Here one finds the potential for awakening one’s perception and agency of self-discovery." The show has since seen new realizations in two different spaces. Firstly in May 2019 as part of the Venice Biennale titled, Artists Need To Create On the Same Scale That Society Has the Capacity To Destroy: Mare Nostrum, an exhibition co-curated with art historian and independent curator Francesca Pietropaolo. Secondly the show has had its most revisitation at the Colby College Museum of Art in July 2019 titled, Occupy Colby: Artists Need to Create on the Same Scale That Society Has the Capacity to Destroy, Year 2.

Bui served as curatorial advisor at MoMA PS1 from 2007 to 2010 where he organized monographic exhibitions of artists including Robert Bergman, Jonas Mekas, Joanna Pousette-Dart, Tony Fitzpatrick, Harriet Korman, and Jack Whitten, and numerous group exhibitions including Irrational Profusion: Nicole Cherubini, Marc Leuthold, Joyce Robins, Peter Schlesinger and Orpheus Selection: Nicola Lopez & Lisa Sigal. Bui has curated other exhibitions at various galleries including recent work by Ron Gorchov at Cheim & Read as well as Exquisite Fucking Boredom, an exhibition of Polaroid images by artist and writer Emma Bee Bernstein at Microscope Gallery.

== Artist ==
View of "Social Environment #2" at Mana Contemporary, a 2014 installation by Phong H. Bui. Photo by Zach Garlitos

A graduate of the University of the Arts in Philadelphia, PA, Bui continued his postgraduate studies at the New York Studio School of Drawing, Painting, and Sculpture and studied independently with Nicolas Carone. Bui is a multi-disciplinary artist whose work includes painting, sculpture, and site-specific installation. Since 2012 he has been working on his ongoing social sculpture/environment, which attempts to realize "art as social activity" and to reinforce the notion that "the process of art making is the art." In 2006, Bui won the Award in Art from the American Academy of Arts and Letters, and the Eric Isenburger Annual Prize for Installation from the National Academy Museum. His work has been included in group exhibitions at Pierogi, the Brooklyn Museum of Art, and the North Dakota Museum of Art. Bui has lectured at Skowhegan School of Painting and Sculpture, Columbia University, Cooper Union, Bard College, and taught at Yale University, Rhode Island School of Design, University of Pennsylvania, and the School of Visual Arts where he is currently giving graduate seminars in MFA Writing and Criticism and MFA Photography, Video, and Related Media.

== Recognition ==
Bui has won an Arcadia Traveling Fellowship, a Hohenberg Traveling Fellowship, and a Pollock-Krasner Foundation Fellowship, and in 2014 was the keynote speaker of The Scholastic Art and Writing Awards, and was the Visionary Honoree at Art in General's Annual Benefit. In 2017, Bui was awarded the Dorothea and Leo Rabkin Foundation Prize in Fine Arts Journalism. In 2019, the Lunder Institute named Bui a 2019 Lunder Institute Fellow. In July 2019, Bui received the Jetté Award for Leadership in the Arts 2019 from Colby College Museum of Art as well as curating Occupy Colby: Artists Need to Create on the Same Scale That Society Has the Capacity to Destroy, Year 2.

In 2017, Bui was a member of the jury that selected Reem Fadda for the Menil Collection's Walter Hopps Award for Curatorial Achievement.
