= Chris Martin (artist) =

American painter (born 1954)

- Born: 1954 (age 71–72); Washington, DC
- Known for: Painting
- Movement: Casualism

Chris Martin (born 1954) is an American abstract painter who lives and works in Brooklyn, New York and the Catskills region of New York State.

== Early life and education ==
Chris Martin was born in Washington, DC, in 1954. His grandmother was a landscape painter. He grew up in Washington, and works in Brooklyn, New York. He studied painting at Yale University but did not complete the course; in the 1990s he attended the School of Visual Arts and left with a degree in art therapy. He worked as an art therapist for some fifteen years.

== Work ==
He makes colorful, abstract paintings, often with elements of collage and text. His work is casualist, and employs various media. He considers it to be influenced by the Catskill Mountains, which he often visited when young.

An early member of the Williamsburg art scene, he still maintains the same studio he has had since the mid-1980s, in what used to be a florist's freezer.
