= Two Coats of Paint =

Online art magazine

- Website type: Independent Art Blog, Art, Culture
- Owner: Sharon Butler
- Website: Two Coats of Paint
- Launched: May 2007
- Current status: Active

Founded in 2007 by artist Sharon Butler, Two Coats of Paint is an independent art blogazine about contemporary painting and related subjects. In 2013 and 2016 Two Coats of Paint was the recipient of Creative Capital/Warhol Foundation Arts Writing Grants for blogging. Originally conceived as a digest of articles from around the Internet, Two Coats of Paint now publishes primarily original content, with an emphasis on abstract art, artist interviews, studio visits, art fair coverage, exhibition listings and reviews, and films related to art. Based in New York, the blogazine has been sponsored by many museums, universities, galleries and arts organizations including the Guggenheim Museum, Whitney Museum, New Art Dealers Association (NADA), School of Visual Arts, Maryland Institute College of Art, American University, and Rhode Island School of Design. In 2016, Time Out New York named Two Coats of Paint among the top art websites. Publisher Sharon Butler is an accomplished painter and said in a 2014 interview that she considers blogging to be an important part of her art practice.
