= List of Guggenheim Fellowships awarded in 2021 =

List of Guggenheim Fellowships awarded in 2021:

Fellow	Category	Field of Study
Rez Abbasi	Creative Arts	Music Composition
Amy Adler	Creative Arts	Fine Arts
Ufuk Akcigit	Social Sciences	Economics
Sama Alshaibi	Creative Arts	Photography
Priyanga Amarasekare	Natural Sciences	Biology
R. Lanier Anderson	Humanities	Philosophy
Ali Anooshahr	Humanities	South & Southeast Asian Studies
Ephraim Asili	Creative Arts	Film-Video
Brandon Ballengée	Creative Arts	Fine Arts
Vincent Barletta	Humanities	Medieval & Renaissance History
Ellen Bass	Creative Arts	Poetry
Marisa Anne Bass	Humanities	Early Modern Studies
Lisa Beck	Creative Arts	Fine Arts
Ashkan Behzadi	Creative Arts	Music Composition
Joshua Bennett	Humanities	American Literature
William Bialek	Natural Sciences	Physics
Dara Birnbaum	Creative Arts	Fine Arts
Alexandre Blais	Natural Sciences	Physics
Suzanne Bloom	Creative Arts	Photography
L. M. Bogad	Humanities	Theatre Arts and Performance Studies
Adriana Darielle Mejía Briscoe	Natural Sciences	Biology
A.K. Burns	Creative Arts	Fine Arts
Keith L. Camacho	Social Sciences	Anthropology and Cultural Studies
Crystal Z Campbell	Creative Arts	Fine Arts
Enrique Chagoya	Creative Arts	Fine Arts
Christopher J. Chang	Natural Sciences	Chemistry
Alexander Chee	Creative Arts	General Nonfiction
Don Mee Choi	Creative Arts	Poetry
Peter H. Christensen	Humanities	Architecture, Planning and Design
Kamari Clarke	Social Sciences	Anthropology and Cultural Studies
Andrea Cohen	Creative Arts	Poetry
Jessica Cohen	Humanities	Translation
William Cordova	Creative Arts	Fine Arts
Raúl Coronado	Humanities	American Literature
Robyn Creswell	Humanities	Literary Criticism
Keren Cytter	Creative Arts	Film-Video
Julie Nelson Davis	Humanities	Fine Arts Research
Elizabeth Mary DeLoughrey	Humanities	Literary Criticism
Donnacha Dennehy	Creative Arts	Music Composition
Mesmin Destin	Social Sciences	Psychology
Arjun Dey	Natural Sciences	Astronomy Astrophysics
Zosha Di Castri	Creative Arts	Music Composition
Suhas Diggavi	Natural Sciences	Engineering
Simon Doubleday	Humanities	Medieval & Renaissance History
Luba Drozd	Creative Arts	Fine Arts
Tarek El-Ariss	Humanities	Literary Criticism
Tommie-Waheed Evans	Creative Arts	Choreography
Lenore Fahrig	Natural Sciences	Geography and Environmental Studies
Oscar E. Fernandez	Natural Sciences	Applied Mathematics
Emil Ferris	Creative Arts	Fine Arts
Maureen Fleming	Creative Arts	Choreography
Eve Fowler	Creative Arts	Fine Arts
Ian Frazier	Creative Arts	General Nonfiction
Richard Allen Frishman	Creative Arts	Photography
Lilian Garcia-Roig	Creative Arts	Fine Arts
John S. Garrison	Humanities	English Literature
Edward Gauvin	Humanities	Translation
William Giraldi	Creative Arts	General Nonfiction
David Goldstein	Humanities	Linguistics
Michelle Grabner	Creative Arts	Fine Arts
Emily Greble	Humanities	European and Latin American History
Kaitlyn Greenidge	Creative Arts	Fiction
Farah Jasmine Griffin	Creative Arts	General Nonfiction
Michael Gubser	Humanities	Intellectual and Cultural History
Diana Guerrero-Maciá	Creative Arts	Fine Arts
Cindy Hahamovitch	Humanities	U.S. History
Josephine Halvorson	Creative Arts	Fine Arts
Sidney R. Hemming	Natural Sciences	Earth Science
Ed Hill	Creative Arts	Photography
Guanglei Hong	Social Sciences	Education
Steven P. Hopkins	Humanities	Religion
Christopher L. Huggins	Creative Arts	Choreography
Faren Humes	Creative Arts	Film-Video
Mitchell S. Jackson	Creative Arts	Fiction
Zig Jackson	Creative Arts	Photography
Lochlann Jain	Humanities	History of Science, Technology and Economics
Michael Jang	Creative Arts	Photography
Victoria Johnson	Creative Arts	Biography
Reece Jones	Natural Sciences	Geography and Environmental Studies
Tayari Jones	Creative Arts	Fiction
Joan Judge	Humanities	East Asian Studies
Vicky Kalogera	Natural Sciences	Astronomy Astrophysics
Amalia D. Kessler	Social Sciences	Constitutional Studies
Sung Hwan Kim	Creative Arts	Fine Arts
Paul J. Kosmin	Humanities	Classics
Seth Koven	Humanities	Intellectual and Cultural History
Richard Kraft	Creative Arts	Film-Video
Jesse Krimes	Creative Arts	Fine Arts
Eugenia Kumacheva	Natural Sciences	Chemistry
Stephen Kuusisto	Creative Arts	Poetry
Jennifer Lackey	Humanities	Philosophy
Mike Lew	Creative Arts	Drama and Performance Art
Ken Light	Creative Arts	Photography
Sandra Lim	Creative Arts	Poetry
Karen Lofgren	Creative Arts	Fine Arts
Irene E. Lusztig	Creative Arts	Film-Video
Sky Macklay	Creative Arts	Music Composition
Jill Magid	Creative Arts	Film-Video
Elizabeth Malaska	Creative Arts	Fine Arts
Stephen Marc	Creative Arts	Photography
Isabela Mares	Social Sciences	Political Science
Miya Masaoka	Creative Arts	Music Composition
Daniel Mason	Creative Arts	Fiction
Alison McAlpine	Creative Arts	Film-Video
Atif Mian	Social Sciences	Economics
Amira Mittermaier	Humanities	Religion
Helen Molesworth	Creative Arts	General Nonfiction
Alexandre Moratto	Creative Arts	Film-Video
Tracie Morris	Creative Arts	Poetry
Kevin J. Mumford	Humanities	U.S. History
Susan Murray	Creative Arts	Film, Video, & New Media Studies
José Ome Navarrete Mazatl	Creative Arts	Choreography
Jason Nieh	Natural Sciences	Computer Science
Chon Noriega	Humanities	Fine Arts Research
Kevin Lewis O'Neill	Social Sciences	Anthropology and Cultural Studies
Nkeiru Okoye	Creative Arts	Music Composition
Pepón Osorio	Creative Arts	Fine Arts
Laura Otis	Humanities	English Literature
Imani Perry	Humanities	Intellectual and Cultural History
Steven Phelps	Natural Sciences	Neuroscience
Seth D. Pollak	Social Sciences	Psychology
Lisa Pon	Humanities	Fine Arts Research
Bianca Premo	Humanities	European and Latin American History
George Prochnik	Creative Arts	General Nonfiction
Laurence Ralph	Social Sciences	Anthropology and Cultural Studies
Kameelah Janan Rasheed	Creative Arts	Fine Arts
Tamara Reynolds	Creative Arts	Photography
Ronit Ricci	Humanities	South & Southeast Asian Studies
Jonathan A. Rodden	Social Sciences	Political Science
John A. Rogers	Natural Sciences	Engineering
Jono Rotman	Creative Arts	Photography
Julia Rudolph	Social Sciences	Law
Victoria Sambunaris	Creative Arts	Photography
Eric W. Sanderson	Natural Sciences	Geography and Environmental Studies
Igor Santos	Creative Arts	Music Composition
Debarati Sanyal	Humanities	European and Latin American Literature
Kaneza Schaal	Creative Arts	Drama and Performance Art
Rebecca Schneider	Humanities	Theatre Arts and Performance Studies
Dread Scott	Creative Arts	Fine Arts
Todd Shepard	Humanities	European and Latin American History
James Siena	Creative Arts	Fine Arts
Annie Silverstein	Creative Arts	Film-Video
Helen Simoneau	Creative Arts	Choreography
Cauleen Smith	Creative Arts	Film-Video
Jane South	Creative Arts	Fine Arts
Annie Sprinkle	Creative Arts	Film-Video
Wendell Steavenson	Creative Arts	General Nonfiction
Beth Stephens	Creative Arts	Film-Video
Bill Sullivan	Creative Arts	Photography
Robert Sullivan	Creative Arts	General Nonfiction
Sarah Cameron Sunde	Creative Arts	Drama and Performance Art
Helen Sung	Creative Arts	Music Composition
Ron Tarver	Creative Arts	Photography
Keeanga-Yamahtta Taylor	Humanities	U.S. History
Michelle Tea	Creative Arts	General Nonfiction
Craig Morgan Teicher	Creative Arts	Poetry
Roberto José Tejada	Creative Arts	Poetry
F. Akif Tezcan	Natural Sciences	Chemistry
Jorge Thielen Armand	Creative Arts	Film-Video
Heather Ann Thompson	Humanities	U.S. History
Melissa Thorne	Creative Arts	Fine Arts
Michael Tonry	Social Sciences	Law
Tourmaline	Creative Arts	Film-Video
Ming Tsao	Creative Arts	Music Composition
James Tweedie	Humanities	Film, Video, & New Media Studies
Rodrigo Valenzuela	Creative Arts	Photography
Laura van den Berg	Creative Arts	Fiction
Chris Verene	Creative Arts	Photography
Elio Villafranca	Creative Arts	Music Composition
Connie Voisine	Creative Arts	Poetry
Roslyn Weiss	Humanities	Philosophy
Tisa Wenger	Humanities	Religion
Paige West	Social Sciences	Anthropology and Cultural Studies
Christopher Williams	Creative Arts	Choreography
Peter B. Williams	Creative Arts	Fine Arts
Patrick C. M. Wong	Humanities	Linguistics
Mark Wunderlich	Creative Arts	Poetry
Paul Yoon	Creative Arts	Fiction
Katherine Young	Creative Arts	Music Composition
Nina C. Young	Creative Arts	Music Composition
Jake Yuzna	Creative Arts	Film-Video
Tara Zahra	Humanities	European and Latin American History
Kate Zambreno	Creative Arts	General Nonfiction
Geneviève Zubrzycki	Social Sciences	Sociology
