= Don Joint =

American painter (born 1956

- Born: November 3, 1956 (age 69); Erie, Pennsylvania, U.S.
- Education: Maryland Institute College of Art, Chautauqua Institution
- Known for: Artist, painting, assemblage, drawing, photography

Don Joint (born November 3, 1956) is an American artist and curator who lives and works in New York City. His work consists of collage, assemblage, painting, works on paper, and photography.

Joint studied at the Maryland Institute College of Art and the Chautauqua Institution.

== Artist ==
=== Exhibition ===
Joint's work has been shown internationally in solo exhibitions at Pavel Zoubok Gallery, NY; Washington County Museum of Fine Arts, Hagerstown, MD; [FRED [London], England; Galerie Marion Meyer, Paris, France; Price Street Gallery, New York, NY.

His work has been included extensively in two-person and group shows in galleries and museums across the United States and Europe, including the Dr. M.T. Geoffrey Art Gallery, St John's University, Queens, NY; Katonah Museum of Art, Katonah, NY; McClain Gallery, Houston, TX; The Daum Museum of Contemporary Art, Sedalia, MO; Samek Art Gallery, Bucknell University, Lewisburg, PA; The Islip Art Museum, East Islip, NY; Pavel Zoubok Gallery, New York, NY; FRED [London]; Zoller Gallery, Penn State University, State College, PA; and Francis M. Naumann Fine Art, New York, NY.

His work has been reviewed in The New York Times, Art in America, ARTnews and The New York Sun among others, and has been written about by Susanna Coffey, Grace Glueck, Mario Naves and Edward Leffingwell.

Don Joint is represented in New York by Francis M. Naumann Fine Art and his collage work is represented in New York by Pavel Zoubok Gallery.

=== Public Collections ===
Selected public collections with Joint's work include Baltimore Museum of Art, Cleveland Museum of Art, David Owsley Museum of Art at Ball State University, Erie Art Museum, Joel and Lila Harnett Museum of Art at the University of Richmond, Mount Holyoke College, Oklahoma City Museum of Art, Syracuse University Art Museum, Swope Art Museum, and University of Iowa Museum of Art.

=== Residencies ===
Joint has held residencies at the Virginia Center for the Creative Arts and the Vermont Studio Center.

=== Book Covers ===
Joint created collages for the cover for every issue of the annual arts journal The Sienese Shredder (2006–2010) and the slipcase that housed the volumes, as well as the 10th Anniversary Edition of Virginia Woolf's On Being Ill, published by Paris Press in 2012.

== Curator ==
As curator of the Shredder space, Joint was a pivotal to the partnership that formed New York's Schroeder Romero & Shredder gallery. Interviewed by Art in America Magazine, the gallery's director Mark Shortliffe encapsulated the program: "The gallery will always have a strong contemporary show but will hopefully stretch how we view new art by pairing it with older, influential works. We'll show two exhibitions simultaneously: one contemporary and one historical, encouraging a dialogue between the two."

In The New York Times review of Schroeder Romero's VIVD and Shredder's PAVERS, Roberta Smith said, "The shows' invigorating call and response bodes well for future interactions between these side-by-side entities."

As an independent curator, Joint also organized Manufactured Unreality: The Art of Collage at Francis M. Naumann Fine Art
