= The Sienese Shredder =

- Editors: Brice Brown, Trevor Winkfield, Mark Shortliffe
- Categories: Literary magazine
- Frequency: Annual
- Founded: 2006
- Final issue: 2010
- Company: Sienese Shredder Editions
- Country: USA
- Based in: New York City
- Language: English
- Website: www.sienese-shredder.com

The Sienese Shredder was an annual journal of art, literature, design, poetry, and music that was published between 2006 and 2010. In addition to written and visual content, each issue contained an audio CD.

== History ==
The Sienese Shredder was launched in 2006 by New York City-based artists Brice Brown and Trevor Winkfield. They sought to bring attention to artists, art, poetry and writing that had been largely neglected or forgotten. Often this work was completed in the 19th and early 20th centuries. Mark Shortliffe took over as co-editor in 2009 for issue 4.

Each issue brings together poetry, critical writing, visual arts, unpublished rarities, oddball ephemera and other culturally significant material in a way that is exciting, contemporary and fresh. Contents can include writings by visual artists; art by writers; poets as installation artists; photographers as poets, and the range of contributors moves from the well-known and up-and-coming to the unknown or forgotten.

As an archival project, each issue of The Sienese Shredder comes with a CD recording of a well-known poet reading or a musician presenting a retrospective sampling their work. #1 contained an audio CD of poet Harry Mathews reading selected poems he had written between 1955 and 2005. #2 contained an audio CD of poet Charles North reading selected poems he had written between 1970 and 2005. #3 contains an audio CD of music made between 1991 and 2004 by Eric Moe.

== Contributors ==
=== Alphabetically ===
- Mitchell Algus
- Christiane Andersson
- Guillaume Apollinaire
- John Ashbery
- Tim Atkins
- Jack Barth
- William Beckford
- Wilson Bentley
- Bill Berkson
- Alan Bernheimer
- Nayland Blake
- Sean Bonney
- André du Bouchet
- Brice Brown
- Francois Caradec
- Nick Carbó
- David Carbone
- Gary Cardot
- Marie Chaix
- Miles Champion
- Susanna Coffey
- David Coggins
- Christophe (Georges Colomb)
- Elaine Lustig Cohen
- Jess (Collins)
- Clark Coolidge
- William Corbett
- R. Crumb
- David Park Curry
- Simon Cutts
- Tim Davis
- Matilde Daviu
- Jean Day
- Willem de Kooning
- Richard Deming
- Edwin Denby
- Robert Desnos
- Thomas Devaney
- Mark Doty
- Denise Duhamel
- David Ebony
- Chris Edgar
- Lance Esplund
- Brad Ewing
- Larry Fagin
- Luigi Ferrari
- Mark Ford
- Elsa von Freytag-Loringhoven
- Michael Gizzi
- Peter Gizzi
- Lanie Goodman
- John Goodrich
- John Graham
- David Gray
- Elliott Green
- Ted Greenwald
- Jon Gregg
- Richard Griffin
- Allan Gurganus
- Rochelle Gurstein
- Jane Hammond
- Paul Hammond
- Hilary Harkness
- Kreg Hasegawa
- Christian Hawkey
- Duncan Hannah
- Mary Heilmann
- Richard Hennessy
- Hannah Höch
- Joris-Karl Huysmans
- Timothy Hyman
- James Jaffe
- Shirley Jaffe
- Malia Jensen
- Jasper Johns
- Don Joint
- Mauricio Kagel
- Nathan Kernan
- Kim Keever
- Jerome Kitzke
- Guy Klucevsek
- Walter Klüppelholz
- Tim Knox
- Louise Kruger
- Nancy Kuhl
- Aaron Kunin
- Erik La Prade
- Alfred Leslie
- Paul Etienne Lincoln
- Guy Maddin
- Gerard Malanga
- Fred Mann
- Virgil Marti
- Harry Mathews
- Bernadette Mayer
- Michael McAllister
- James Meetze
- Marion Meyer
- Melissa Meyer
- Joan Mitchell
- Eric Moe
- Ron Morosan
- Terry R. Myers
- Francis M. Naumann
- Mario Naves
- Michael Neff
- Gérard de Nerval
- Charles North
- Ron Padgett
- Carl Plansky
- Sarah Plimpton
- Mark Polizzotti
- Marcin Ramocki
- Carter Ratcliff
- Rudolph Ruegg
- Frances Richard
- Larry Rivers
- Raphael Rubinstein
- Naomi Savage
- James Schuyler
- Kurt Schwitters
- Iliassa Sequin
- Alan Shockley
- Mark Shortliffe
- Judith Stein
- Adrian Stokes
- David Storey
- Myron Stout
- Arne Svenson
- Karen Swenson
- Barbara Takenaga
- Justin Taylor
- Evelyn Twitchell
- Susan Unterberg
- Charles Vallely
- Paul Verlaine
- Mark Wagner
- Denton Welch
- Lawrence Weschler
- Martin Wilner
- Trevor Winkfield
- Alexi Worth
- Albert York
- Amy Yoes
- Bill Zavatsky
- Scott Zieher
- Pavel Zoubok
