= Robert Satloff =

American historian

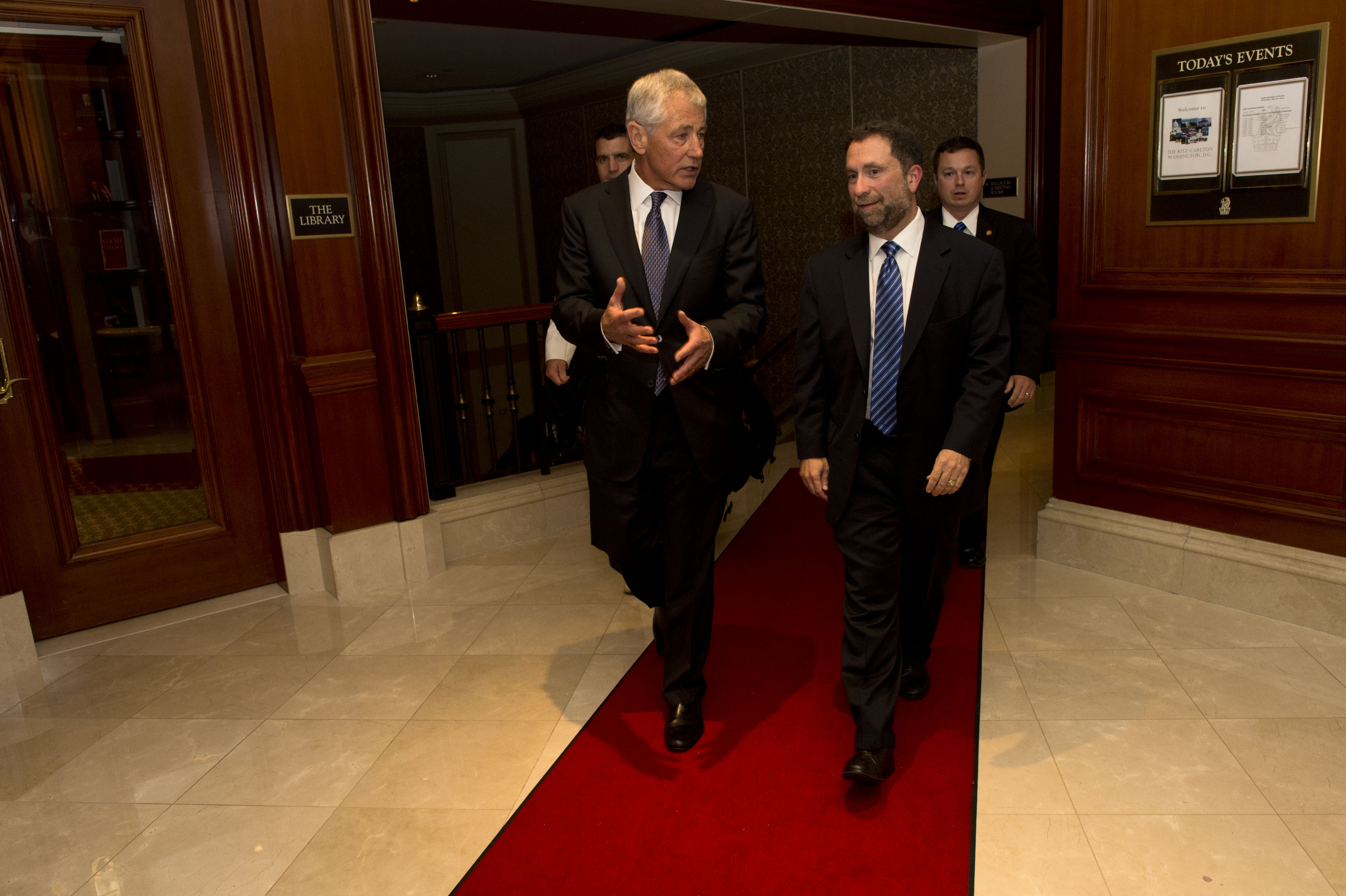
- Sartloff with U.S. Defense Secretary Chuck Hagel
- Education: Duke University (BA); Harvard University (MA); St. Antony's College, Oxford (PhD)
- Spouse: Jennie Litvack
- Children: 3

Robert B. Satloff is an American historian on Arab and Islamic politics, U.S.-Israel relations, and the Middle East. Since January 1993, he has been the executive director of the Washington Institute for Near East Policy (WINEP). Satloff is also a member of the board of editors of the Middle East Quarterly, a publication of the Middle East Forum.

== Early life ==
Satloff is from Providence, Rhode Island. He holds a BA from Duke University, a MA from Harvard University, and a PhD from St. Antony's College, Oxford.

== Writing career ==
Satloff has authored or edited nine books. His writing has appeared in newspapers such as The New York Times, The Wall Street Journal, The Washington Post, and the Los Angeles Times.

In 2006, Satloff wrote Among the Righteous: Lost Stories from the Holocaust's Long Reach into Arab Lands, which asserted that some Muslims and Arabs rescued potential victims of the Holocaust as well as those who collaborated in those programs. He claimed that no Arab had been honored saving Jews during the Holocaust and explored reasons why. Norman Stillman described the book as a "well-balanced assessment" of the experience of Moroccan Jews during World War II. It was also reviewed by the Jewish Book Council. In 2010, American broadcaster PBS released Among the Righteous, a documentary based on Satloff's book.

Satloff has also provided commentary for news programs and talk shows, as well as National Public Radio. Satloff hosts a program on an Arab satellite channel: he is the creator and host of Dakhil Washington (Inside Washington), a weekly news and interview program on al-Hurra, the U.S. government-sponsored Arabic satellite television channel.

== Personal life ==
Satloff lived in Chevy Chase, Maryland, with his wife, Jennie Litvack, an economist and horn player, and three sons, Benjamin, William and David. He is Jewish.

== Reception ==
Satloff has been described as "a longtime expert on Arab and Islamic politics". In 2023, Washingtonian magazine named him one of the 500 most influential people in Washington, D.C.

== Publications ==
- Among the Righteous: Lost Stories from the Holocaust's Long Reach into Arab Lands (PublicAffairs, 2006). ISBN 1-58648-399-4
- The Battle of Ideas in the War on Terror: Essays on U.S. Public Diplomacy in the Middle East (The Washington Institute, 2004).
- U.S. Policy toward Islamism (Council on Foreign Relations, 2000)
- From Abdullah to Hussein: Jordan in Transition (Oxford University Press, 1994)
- Troubles on the East Bank: Challenges to the Domestic Stability of Jordan (Praeger, 1986)
