= Mernet Larsen =

American artist (born 1940)

- Born: 1940 (age 85–86); Houghton, Michigan
- Known for: Painting
- Movement: Contemporary art, figurative painting, semi-abstraction, mixed media
- Spouse: Roger Clay Palmer
- Awards: National Endowment for the Arts, MacDowell
- Website: Mernet Larsen

Mernet Larsen, Intersection (after El Lissitzky), acrylic and mixed media on canvas, 46.75" x 63", 2020.

Mernet Larsen (born 1940) is an American artist known for idiosyncratic, disorienting narrative paintings that depict a highly abstracted, parallel world of enigmatic and mundane scenarios. Since 2000, her work has been characterized by flat, origami-like figures composed of plank-like shapes and blocky volumes and non-illusionistic space with a dislocated, aggregated vision freely combining incompatible pictorial systems—reverse, isometric, parallel, and conventional Renaissance perspectives—and various visual distortions. Critics have described her approach as "a heady, unlikely brew" taking compositional cues from wide-ranging sources, including the modernist geometries of Constructivist artists like El Lissitzky, Japanese Bunraku puppet theater and emaki narrative scrolls, early Chinese landscapes, and Indian miniatures and palace paintings. Roberta Smith wrote that Larsen's works "navigate the divide between abstraction and representation with a form of geometric figuration that owes less to Cubo-Futurism than to de Chirico, architectural rendering and early Renaissance painting of the Sienese kind. They relish human connection and odd, stretched out, sometimes contradictory perspectival effects, often perpetuated by radical shifts in scale." Andrew Berardini writes: “With perspective bending in and around itself in Mernet’s paintings, flat space folds the near and far into everything all at once, an immersion where all the vanishing points suddenly appear and aim their infinity like pistols directly back at you.”

Larsen has exhibited at the American Academy of Arts and Letters, National Museum of Women in the Arts, White Cube (London), Israel Museum (Jerusalem), Tampa Museum of Art and Art Gallery of New South Wales (Australia), among other venues. Her work is in the permanent collections of the Whitney Museum, Los Angeles County Museum of Art, Museum of Fine Arts, Boston and Walker Art Center, among others. She lives and works in Tampa, Florida and Jackson Heights, New York with her husband, artist Roger Clay Palmer.

== Early life and career ==
Larsen was born in 1940 in Houghton, Michigan and spent her youth in Chicago and then Gainesville, Florida. By high school she was interested in contemporary art and painting. She earned a BFA from the University of Florida in 1962, where painter and professor Hiram D. Williams encouraged her to pursue interests in representational work and the essence of objects despite the dominance of abstract expressionism at the time. She continued with graduate work at Indiana University Bloomington (MFA, 1965), studying with painter James McGarrell. After graduating, Larsen taught studio art and art history at the University of Oklahoma, before moving to Tampa and taking a position at the University of South Florida in 1967; she taught painting and drawing there until retiring, professor emeritus, in 2003.

Mernet Larsen, Escalator, acrylic and mixed media on canvas, 44" x 44", 1988.

Larsen lived intermittently in Tampa and New York for almost a decade before settling in Tampa in 1981. In the 1970s, she painted images of composite, figurative scenes—often observations of city life based on fragments of photographs—that sought to sought to deconstruct traditional realist concepts of homogeneous, unified vision. Her figurative work subsequently shifted in a geometric direction, before entering a period (roughly 1984 to 1999) in which she produced process-oriented, abstract paintings that were influenced by Japanese art, Roland Barthes and structuralism; these paintings revealed the implications and limits of modern formalism by engaging non-formalist literary borrowings, representational plays, and concrete referentiality. Described as cool, distanced and highly textured, they were characterized by simple shapes, limited palettes, and an emphasis on the physical surface, which Larsen scraped, buried, collaged, built up and peeled to produce an effect resembling old weathered walls. She frequently deconstructed modernist abstract and non-western paintings as compositional springboards for the largely abstract works, whose shapes, linear elements and titles (Escalator, 1988; Archer, 1996; Weight Lifter, 1999) alluded to figuration and spatial relationships.

Larsen began exhibiting regularly in the late 1970s and over roughly two decades appeared in solo shows in Florida galleries, various American university venues, and a retrospective at the DeLand Museum of Art (1992), as well as group shows at the Contemporary Arts Center (New Orleans), American Academy of Arts and Letters, and Tampa Museum of Art, among others.

== Later work and reception ==
Mernet Larsen, Explanation, acrylic and mixed media on canvas, 41" x 52", 2007. Collection of the Rose Art Museum.

In 1999, Larsen adopted an approach that reversed the direction of early modernists by translating abstract paintings into precise, more clearly representational and recognizable—if highly constructed—narrative and figurative works. The new paintings combined cool, creamy color schemes and a unique method that seamlessly integrated acrylic paint, cut-and-painted tracing paper and manipulated textures. They depicted a parallel semiotic universe of horizon-less, tilting panoramas and situations frozen in time and populated by characters that married abstract planes of color to well-observed figuration and detail (e.g., The Writer, 2001). Reviews would describe the work as surreal, disorienting and metaphorically complex in its juxtapositions of non-sequitur humor and foreboding, upended perception and de-familiarized everyday life. In 2005, Larsen exhibited this work at the New York Studio School a show that New York Observer critic Mario Naves wrote, displayed "a deep-seated originality" in its mix of absurdism, surprising quietude and diverse influences.

Following that exhibition and another at Regina Rex in Queens (2011), Larsen gained widespread recognition with her Manhattan gallery debut, "Three Chapters", a three-part show at Johannes Vogt Gallery in 2012. By that time, she had introduced more disruptive compositions that rejected a singular viewpoint and employed reverse perspective—a system common to Roman and Byzantine icon painting and the spatial conundrums of artists Al Held and M. C. Escher, in which elements enlarge (rather than shrink) as they recede from the picture plane. John Yau described these paintings as adhering to a singular logic governed by Larsen's "imaginative synthesis and restating of radically different artists and traditions [that] do not jibe with traditional spatial relationships but fit together like overpasses, cloverleaves, service roads, and on-ramps."

The painted scenarios in that show—and a subsequent one at Various Small Fires (2015)—ranged from banal (exercising, domestic life, meetings, café and mall trips) to quixotic (religious happenings, war rooms) to cryptic (a stork hovering over a woman in mall holding a baby aloft in Mall Event, 2010; the vaguely ominous Chainsawer and Bicyclist, 2014). Typical were several paintings of faculty and organizational meetings, such as Explanation and Committee (both 2007) or Tanks (2006), with figures depicted in slumped postures and distorted perspectives and scales that seemed to allude to endemic, underlying psychological or social aspects, such as recurrent and petty power struggles, conformity, boredom and absurdity. Reviewers suggested that a key to the work was Larsen's apparent ability to imbue the protagonists and situations with warmth, distilled emotion and specificity—despite the high degree of stylization—through a constellation of selectively attended to, telling details, an eye for the textured surfaces and the effects of light upon them, and the expressive possibilities of spatial arrangement.

Mernet Larsen, Mall Event, acrylic and mixed media on canvas, 50" x 55", 2010.

Artcritical identified a new lightness of spirit on Larsen's exhibition "Things People Do" (James Cohan, 2016), most visible in the emergence of her figures from meetings to the outdoors (e.g., Frontier, 2015), a shift from the claustrophobic, "uniquely pressurized sensation" of some of her previous work. Her exhibition "Situation Rooms" (Cohan, 2018) displayed greater complexity in compositions such as Cabinet Meeting (with Coffee), a disorienting, fish-eye depiction of fantastically small to impossibly large figures in gravity-defy postures that seemed "to dramatize anxiety’s perception-skewing effects" according to The New Yorker. John Yau wrote that Larsen was "simultaneously critical, satirical, and tender" towards these figures that seemed frozen in stiff bodies and isolated, noting an eye for dry, matter-of-fact humor and absurdity that revealed "issues of conformity, hierarchy, and power relationships with straight-faced glee" (e.g., Situation Room (Scissors, Rocks, Paper)).

Her 2021 show at James Cohan consisted of paintings whose compositions directly referenced constructivist artist El Lissitzky. New York Times critic Jillian Steinhauer described the show as one in which "the mundane moment becomes unfamiliar and metaphysical, like a view of reality exploded from within," with angular abstract forms and bisecting planes yielding narrative scenes that were funny (a rooster being handed off to a monk), ominous (a man on a beach with a gun), or cosmic (an astronaut floating in front of a planet). It included works such Solar System, Explained (after El Lissitzky)—a radiating array of shapes offering a bird's-eye view of figures lounging in a circular banquette decorated with a Sputnik-era astronomical model—and Intersection (after El Lissitzky) (both 2020), which depicted a man in a wheelchair walking a dog while overlooking a vortex-like, textured, aerial view of a truck and verdant farmland. Mario Naves characterized Larsen's reworking of space as "linear perspective … thrown under the bus and then reconfigured as origami" that "divests El Lissitzky’s art of philosophical heavy-breathing and uses it as an imprimatur for wit, wonder, and representation."

== Recognition ==
Larsen's work belongs to the permanent collections of the Akron Art Museum, Art Gallery of New South Wales, Carnegie Museum of Art, Fondazione Sandretto Re Rebaudengo (Turin), Hall Art Foundation, Israel Museum, Los Angeles County Museum of Art, Museum of Fine Arts, Boston, Museum of Fine Arts (St. Petersburg, Florida), Ringling Museum of Art, Rollins Museum of Art, Rose Art Museum, Tampa Museum of Art, Walker Art Center, Whitney Museum, and X Museum (Beijing). She has lectured frequently on her work throughout Florida and at the Boston School of Fine Arts, New York Studio School, Parsons School of Design, Maryland Institute College of Art, and other schools and museums.
