= Zubrzycki =

Zubrzycki (feminine: Zubrzycka, plural Zubrzyccy) is a Polish language family name. It may be transliterated from Ukrainian as Zubryckyj, from Russian as Zubritskiy or Zubritsky, as well as other forms. A Germanized variant is Subritzky. Other variants include Zubretski/Zubretsky, Zubreski/Zubresky, Zubretskyi, Zibricki/Zubrycky, etc.

The surname may refer to:

- Geneviève Zubrzycki (born c. 1970), American sociologist
- Jan Sas Zubrzycki (1860–1935), Polish architect
- Jerzy Zubrzycki (1920–2009), Polish-born Australian sociologist
- Sławomir Zubrzycki, Polish musician
- Tom Zubrycki (born 1946), Australian documentary filmmaker

Subritzky

- Subritzky family, Awanui, New Zealand
- Bill Subritzky (1925–2015), New Zealand lawyer and property developer, evangelist and healer
- Victoria Subritzky-Nafatali (born 1991), New Zealand rugby union player
