= Giles Jacob =

British lawyer (1686–1744)

Giles Jacob (1686 – 8 May 1744) was a British legal writer whose works include a well-received law dictionary that became the most popular and widespread law dictionary in the newly independent United States. Jacob was the leading legal writer of his era, according to the Yale Law Library.

The literary works of Giles Jacob did not fare as well as his legal ones, and he feuded with the poet Alexander Pope both publicly and in literary form. Pope named Jacob as one of the dunces in his 1728 Dunciad, referring to Jacob as "the blunderbuss of the law". Jacob is remembered well for his legal writing, though not so much for his poetry and plays.

== Early life ==
Giles was born in Romsey, Hampshire, and was baptized on 22 November 1686. Among eight children, Giles was the only son of Henry and Susannah Jacob. Henry Jacob was a maltster who lived until 1735.

Giles Jacob's legal training included employment by Thomas Freke, and then as a secretary to Sir William Blathwayt. Working for Blathwayt, he engaged in litigation and dispensation, probably in manorial courts.

== Writing career ==
Jacob's first book, The Compleat Court-Keeper (1713), gives detailed and practical instructions for how to administer estate matters. He combined this with a chronological summary of statute law, and the combination was financially successful.

Jacob always had an interest in contemporary poetry and the literary life, and in 1714 he wrote a farce called Love in a Wood, or, The Country Squire. This play was never produced. He persisted, however, and in 1717 he wrote a satire of Alexander Pope's The Rape of the Lock in the form of The Rape of the Smock. The poem was low and bawdy, and the next year he wrote a serious work titled Tractatus de hermaphroditis about the legal status of intersex people, published by Edmund Curll in 1718 (along with the first English-language publication of Ioannes Henricus Meibomius's A treatise of the use of flogging in venereal affairs).

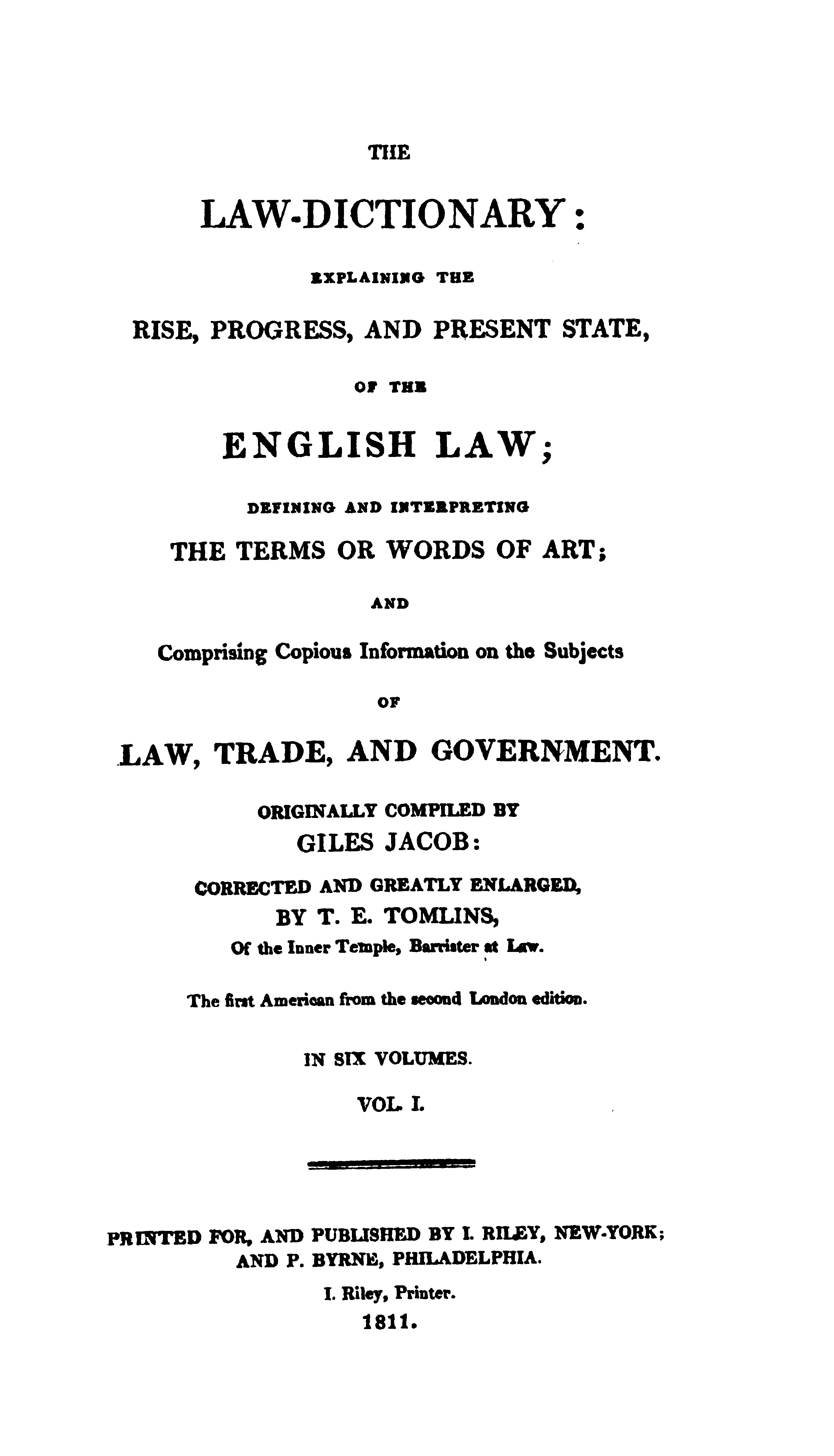
Title page from an 1811 edition of Jacob's The New Law Dictionary.

In 1719, two works appeared by Jacob, both very successful. The first was Lex constitutionis, which was a thoroughly researched compendium of statute law, common law, and criminal law, schematized according to which powers of the executive branch of the government were involved. While the work's fame and usefulness were surpassed in a few years, Jacob's book was a well regarded analysis. The same year, he produced the first volume of the Poetical Register, with a second volume in 1720. This work provided biographies of contemporary authors as well as earlier ones. According to the literary editor Stephen Jones:

[H]e is generally accurate and faithful, and affords much information to those who have occasion to consult him. It cannot be denied that he possessed very small abilities; but he was fully equal to a task where plodding industry, and not genius, must be deemed the essential qualification.

In the Poetical Register, Jacob criticized the play Three Hours After Marriage (1717), which had been written by John Gay with anonymous assistance from John Arbuthnot and Alexander Pope. Jacob wrote that its scenes "trespass[ed] on Female Modesty". He subsequently criticized that play for "obscenity and false Pretence". Jacob had admired Pope, had been on good terms with him, and had submitted the biographical entry of Pope (in the Poetical Register) to Pope himself for correction. Jacob likely did not realize that Three Hours After Marriage had been anonymously co-authored by Pope. In The Dunciad of 1728, Pope pounced:

Jacob, the scourge of grammar, mark with awe,

Nor less revere him, blunderbuss of law.

Pope explained Jacob's offense as follows: "he very grossly and unprovoked abused in that book [the Poetical Register] the author’s friend, Mr. Gay". The play Three Hours After Marriage was panned by most critics as obscene, and literary historian Thomas Lounsbury has explained that no one criticized the play "without incurring [from Pope] an enmity that never died out".

In 1725, Jacob wrote The Student's Companion and regarded it as his favorite of the books he had written. It was a guide to studying law, with practical tips, reviews, and indexes. In 1729, his most famous work, nine years in the making, appeared: A New Law Dictionary. It combined a dictionary of legal practice with an abridgment of statute law, and it reached its fifth edition by the time of Jacob's death. As late as 1807, "Jacob's Law Dictionary" was still a very profitable copyright. His last work was Every Man his Own Lawyer, which outsold even the law dictionary. It was a self-help book for average citizens who might be involved in litigation.

Jacob's legal writings were of a practical and descriptive sort, often compared unfavorably to the analytic and theoretical treatises by authors like William Blackstone. But, according to historian Julia Rudolph, authors like Jacob had a different purpose, in that they "were dealing with the problem of knowledge management or 'information overload,' and in response to this problem the learning of the law was systematized, alphabetized, and organized." Jacob's most successful non-legal writing was of a similarly practical and descriptive sort.

== Personal life ==
Jacob married Jane Dexter in 1733, and they had at least one daughter, also named Jane. He and his family moved to Staines, Middlesex, where he died on 8 May 1744.

== Works ==
- The Compleat Courtkeeper, or Land-Steward's Assistant, 1713; 8th edit. 1819.
- The Accomplished Conveyancer, 3 vols., 1714.
- The Country Gentleman's Vade Mecum, containing an Account of the best Methods to improve Lands, 1717.
- The Compleat Sportsman, in three parts, 1718.
- Lex Mercatoria, 1718.
- Lex Constitutionis, 1719.
- The Laws of Appeal and Murder, 1719.
- The Laws of Taxation, 1720.
- The Land Purchaser's Companion, 1720.
- Poetical Register, or Lives and Characters of the English Dramatic Poets, 2 vols., 1719–20
- The Common Law common-placed, 1726.
- A New Law Dictionary, 1729, fol., which reached a tenth edition in 1782, reissued with additions by T. Tomlins in 1797, 1809, and 1835.
- The Compleat Chancery-Practiser, 1730.
- City Liberties, 1732.
