= Brice Brown =

American artist (born 1972)

- Born: October 10, 1972 (age 53); Louisville, Kentucky, U.S.
- Education: Pratt Institute, Dartmouth College
- Known for: Artist, Painting, Sculpture, Drawing, Photography, Video

Brice Brown (born October 10, 1972) is an American artist who lives and works in New York City.

== Career ==
Brown received his BA from Dartmouth College and his MFA from Pratt Institute. His work has been reviewed in the Artforum, The New York Times, Art in America and The Village Voice among others. He has collaborated on limited editions with poet Denise Duhamel (for the DVD animation "Laiterie") and artist Trevor Winkfield (for the silkscreen portfolio "I Come In Search Of Walnuts"). Brown has held residencies at Yaddo, Virginia Center for the Creative Arts, and Vermont Studio Center. As a writer, Brown was an art critic for The New York Sun from 2005 to 2008, and for City Arts from 2009 to 2010, and has written numerous exhibition catalog essays. He also published and edited an annual arts journal called The Sienese Shredder from 2006 to 2009. He is the current President of the Board of Directors of Visual AIDS in New York City.

== Art ==
=== Selected solo exhibition ===
2014

- I looked down, I realized I had a body; Projective City; Paris, France; Paris-Scope @ Mixed Greens; New York, NY.

2013

- Rosebud; site-specific mural installation during Texas Contemporary Art Fair; Houston, TX. In conjunction with Margaret Thatcher Projects, New York, NY.

2012

- HOMUNCULUS; Schroeder Romero; New York, NY.

2011

- Service Everyday (Dish Queens); The Box at The Standard Hotel, Los Angeles, CA.

2010

- Queening; Schroeder Romero; New York, NY.

2009

- Service Every Day (Dish Queen); Jeff Bailey Gallery; New York, NY.
- Regal Giant; installation at PULSE Miami; Miami, FL.

2008

- American Boy; Francis M. Naumann Fine Art; New York, NY.

2007

- Selling the sound of my voice; vertexList; Williamsburg, Brooklyn. Collaboration with Alan Shockley.
- Compasses are banished; Francis M. Naumann Fine Art; New York, NY.

2005

- Walnuts; Della Brown Taylor Gallery, Davis Fine Arts Building, West Virginia State University; Institute, WV.

=== Selected group exhibition ===
2014

- The Age of Small Things; DODGE gallery; New York, NY. Curated by Chuck Webster.

2013

- Marcel Duchamp's Nude Descending a Staircase: An Homage; Francis M. Naumann Fine Art; New York, NY.
- how you gonna get back to jersey?; Planthouse; New York, NY.

2012

- Dartmouth Alumni Exhibition; The Black Family Visual Arts Center, Hanover, NH.
- Summer Camp; Schroeder Romero; New York, NY.
- Published by the Artist; International Print Center; New York, NY.

2009

- It's a Schro Ro Summer!; Schroeder Romero; New York, NY.
- Play it Forward; Schroeder Romero; New York, NY.
- Collage London/New York; Fred [London]; London, UK. In conjunction with Pavel Zoubok Gallery.
- Inside Abstraction; Janet Kurnatowski gallery; Brooklyn, NY.

2008

- Manufactured Unreality; Francis M. Naumann Fine Art; New York City, NY.

2007

- Demoiselles Revisited; Francis M. Naumann Fine Art; New York City, NY.
- Cut, Copy, Fold; Artist Image Resource; Pittsburgh, PA. Curated by Kim Beck.
- Sosabul International Exhibition; Pyeongtaek City, South Korea.

2006

- Brice Brown and Don Joint: A Marriage in Paint; William Way Gallery; Philadelphia, PA.
- Abstract Landscapes; Newhouse Center for Contemporary Art, Snug Harbor Cultural Center; Staten Island, NY. Curated by Trevor Winkfield.
- Point of Departure; Gallery 111; DUMBO, Brooklyn, NY.

2004

- Brice Brown and Don Joint: A Marriage in Paint; Francis M. Naumann Fine Art; New York, NY.
- f#@k perfection; vertexList; Williamsburg, Brooklyn, NY.
- The Recurrent Haunting Ghost: Reflections of Marcel Duchamp in Modern and Contemporary Art; Francis M. Naumann Fine Art; New York City, NY.

2003

- The Big Abstract Show; The Painting Center, New York City, NY. Curated by Denise Gale.
- Art in a Changing World; Mahady Gallery, Marywood University; Scranton, PA. Curated by Lance Esplund.

=== Public collections ===
Brown's work is included in the public collections of:

- Speed Art Museum; Louisville, KY
- Baltimore Museum of Art, Baltimore, MD
- Yale University, New Haven, CT
- Dartmouth College, Hanover, NH

== Sienese Shredder ==
Brown was editor of The Sienese Shredder, an annual arts and literary journal published from 2006 to 2010. Besides acting as editor, Brown contributed interviews, critical essays, and art to the publication.

He continues to helm Sienese Shredder Editions, an editions- and print-publishing project that has produced multiples with Miles Champion, Jane South, Chuck Webster, John Yau, and Trevor Winkfield.

== Arts criticism ==
Brown was an arts critic at The New York Sun from 2006 to 2008, and for City Arts from 2009 to 2010. He focused on design, decorative arts and antiques.

2007

- "The Soul of the Painting" at Lowy The New York Sun, January 5, 2007. Exhibition review.
- "A Masterpiece in Thread" at the Brooklyn Museum The New York Sun, January 25, 2007. Exhibition review.
- "A Ravenous Obsession" at The Frick The New York Sun, March 8, 2007. Exhibition review.
- "Form and Function" at Bard Graduate Center The New York Sun, March 22, 2007. Exhibition review.
- "A Tale of Two Cities" at Onassis Cultural Center The New York Sun, April 26, 2007. Exhibition review.
- "The Center of the Storm" at Williams College Museum of Art The New York Sun, July 19, 2007. Exhibition review.
- "Uniting the Wild and the Rigid" at Bard Graduate Center The New York Sun, July 26, 2007. Exhibition review.
- "Ingo Maurer" at Cooper-Hewitt National Design Museum The New York Sun, September 27, 2007. Exhibition review.
- "The Father of Modern Design" at Cooper-Hewitt The New York Sun, September 27, 2007. Exhibition review.

2006

- "Apres Nous, Le Deluge" Francis M. Naumann Fine Art; New York City, NY. Catalog essay.
- "Carl Plansky" Fischbach Gallery, New York City, NY. Catalogue essay.
- "Design for the Good Life-Modern Master; Lucien Lelong, Couturier 1918–1948" The New York Sun, March 21, 2006. Exhibition review.
- "An Artist's Gamble" at the Metropolitan Museum of Art The New York Sun, April 27, 2006. Exhibition review.
- "Beasts to Wash Away the Corporeal World" at Bard Graduate Center The New York Sun, July 13, 2006. Exhibition review.
- "The Little Factory that Could – A Taste for Opulence: Selections from the Collection" The New York Sun, March 9, 2006. Exhibition review.
- "A Universe of Forms and Ideas" at the Metropolitan Museum of Art The New York Sun, September 6, 2006. Exhibition review.
- "Buried Treasure" at Asia Society The New York Sun, October 3, 2006. Exhibition review.
- "The Medium is the Mass-Produced Message" at MoMA The New York Sun, October 12, 2006. Exhibition review.
- "An Inside Voice" at Neue Gallery The New York Sun, November 2, 2006. Exhibition review.

2005

- "One Coll Story after Another: Women Artists from the Collection of Dr. Gina Puzzuoli;" The Huntington Museum of Art, Huntington, WV. Catalog essay.

2001

- "Grace Martin Taylor: An American Modernist" The Orange Chicken Gallery, New York, NY. Catalog essay.

2000

- "Freaks, Geeks and Carnies;" The Orange Chicken Gallery; New York, NY. Catalog essay.

== Selected bibliography ==
- 2013 Rosenberg, Karen, "Art in Review: Marcel Duchamp: Nude Descending a Staircase: An Homage." The New York Times, March 14.
- 2012 "Critics Pick." Time Out New York, June 17.
- 2012 Mason, Brooke "Houston Art Fair: Happy Trails in Houston." artnet.com.
- 2010 Cohen, David "Shows to See." NewYorkSun.com.
- 2010 Cohen, David "Brice Brown: Queening." NewYorkSun.com.
- 2010 Patel, Alpesh Kantilal "Critic's Pick, Brice Brown: Queening." Artforum.com.
- 2007 Landi, Ann "Ladies of Considerable Repute." ARTnews.
- 2006 Baker, RC. "Brice Brown." The Village Voice, March 2006.
- 2006 Glueck, Grace. "Art in Review: Brice Brown: Compasses are Banished." The New York Times, March 10, 2006.
- 2005 Leffingwell, Edward, "Brice Brown and Don Joint at Francis M. Naumann Fine Art." Art in America, January 2005, p. 130
- 2005 Williams, Amy. "Poultry and Poetry in Art." www.thegazz.com October 11, 2005.
- 2004 Frank, Peter. "Brice Brown and Don Joint: A Marriage in Paint." www.articles.org. May–June 2004, #0
- 2004 Glueck, Grace. "Art in Review: Brice Brown and Don Joint: A Marriage in Paint." The New York Times, April 23, 2004
- 2004 Walentini, Joseph. "Brice Brown: May Artist Profile." Abstract Art Online, 2003
- 2003 Walentini, Joseph. "Reviews: The Big Abstract Show at the Painting Center." Abstract Art Online, 2003
- 2003 www.artnet.com "New York Shows Explore Dada & Surrealism: The Recurrent Haunting Ghost: Reflections of Marcel Duchamp in Modern and Contemporary Art." October 14, 2003
