= Paige West =

American professor

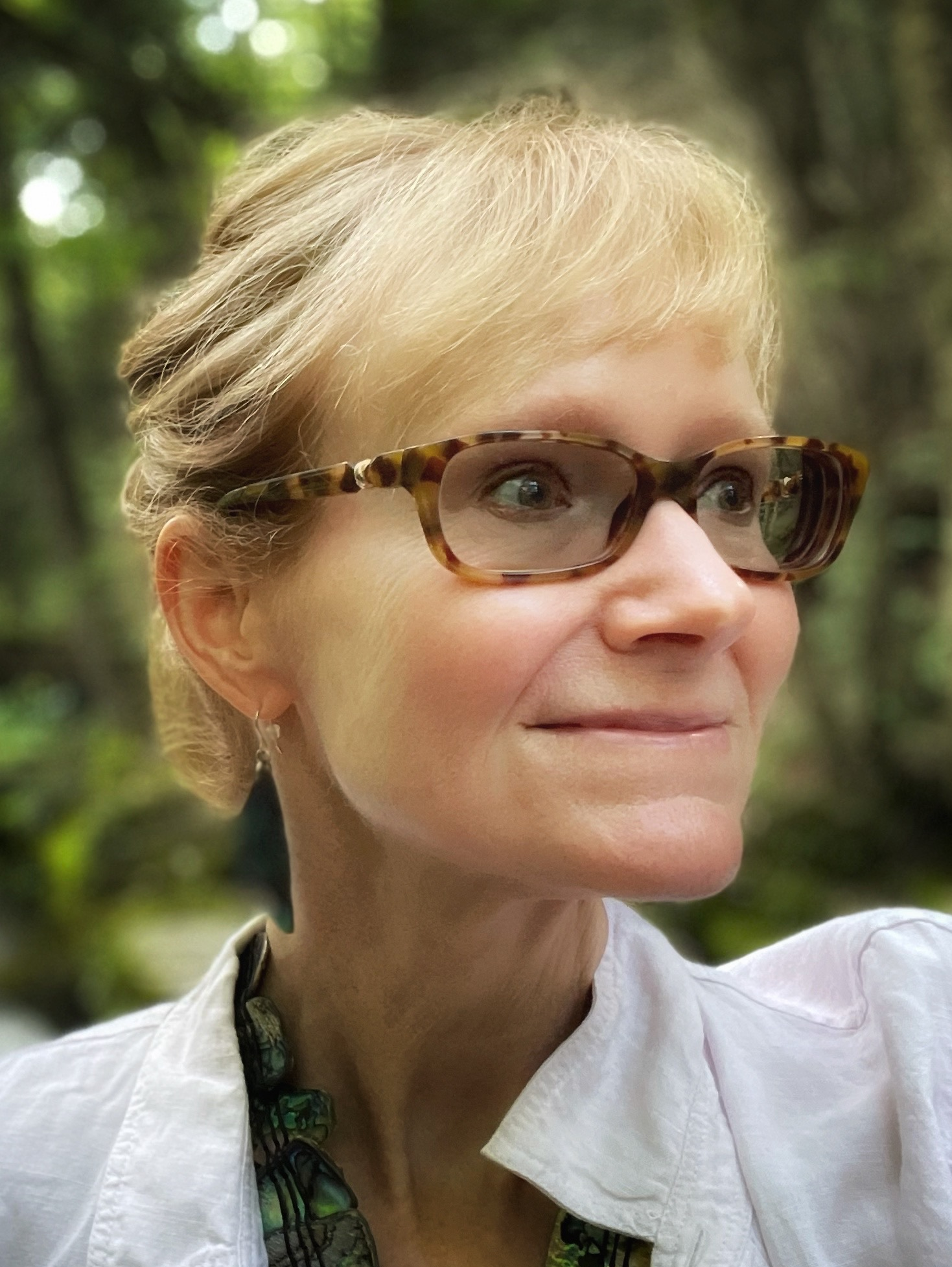
- Paige West in 2021
- Awards: Guggenheim Fellowship (2021)

Academic background
- Education: Wofford College (BA); Rutgers University (PhD)

Academic work
- Discipline: Anthropology
- Institutions: Barnard College; Columbia University

Paige West is Claire Tow Professor of Anthropology at Barnard College. She also serves on the faculty of Columbia University. She earned a Guggenheim Fellowship in 2021.

== Biography ==
West received her B.A. from Wofford College, her M.A. from University of Georgia, and her Ph.D. from Rutgers University. She joined the faculty of Barnard College and Columbia University in 2001 after graduating from Rutgers. Her scholar interest lies in the relationship between societies and their environments, focusing on the linkages between environmental conservation and international development. She has carried out fieldwork in a number of countries, most notably in Papua New Guinea.

West is also affiliated with the Earth Institute. She is the founder of the journal Environment and Society: Advances in Research and served as its editor from 2009 to 2019.

West was Wofford College's commencement speaker in 2016. In 2021, West was also recognized by The Explorers Club as one of the 50 explorers changing the world.
