= Suhas Diggavi =

American electrical engineer

Suhas N. Diggavi from the University of California, Los Angeles was named Fellow of the Institute of Electrical and Electronics Engineers (IEEE) in 2013 for contributions to wireless networks and systems. He received a Guggenheim Fellowship in 2021.
