= Erik La Prade =

American poet

Erik La Prade is an American freelance journalist, poet, photographer, and non-fiction writer. La Prade has had 14 publications. He is based in New York City.

== About ==
Erik La Prade was born in New York City. He received his B.A.degree in English in 1978 and M.A. degree in Comparative Literature in 1990 from City College of New York.

His poems have appeared in Hot Summer Nights: A Collection of Erotic Poetry and Prose (Inner Child Press, 2012), Wildflowers, a Woodstock mountain poetry anthology (Woodstock, NY: Shivistan Publishing), Artist and Influence, Fish Drum, Live Mag!, The Hat, The Reading Room, The Sienese Shredder, and The New York Times. He has also served as Poetry Editor for The Reading Room.

La Prade's poem, "Baudelaire, Ashbery, Updike," earned Things Maps Don't Show (Del Mar, CA: Aegis Press, 1995, pp. 43–44) a place in the Ashbery Research Center (ARC) archive of Bard College. ARC's copy of the book is shelved with a copy of correspondence from La Prade.

A collection of La Prade's interviews, Breaking Through: Richard Bellamy and The Green Gallery, 1960–1965, was published in 2010 by MidMarch Arts Press. The book traces the history of Bellamy's celebrated art gallery through interviews with twenty-three of its exhibited artists including Claes Oldenburg, James Rosenquist, and Frank Stella. A frequently cited source of information on the gallery, the book is archived at both the library of the Museum of Modern Art and at The Metropolitan Museum of Art, Thomas J. Watson Library. La Prade has also published articles and interviews in Art Critical, Art in America, The Brooklyn Rail, NY Arts Magazine, Rain Taxi: A Review of Books, Night Magazine, Captured: A Film/Video History of The Lower East Side (Seven Story Press, 2005), and The Outlaw Bible of American Essays (Thunder's Mouth Press, 2006). He currently writes for Noah Becker's Whitehot Magazine of Contemporary Art.

La Prade not only frequently writes about art and artists, he occasionally makes art. His photo, "A High Line Experience," appears in Lid Magazine #8 archived at the School of Visual Arts Library Picture & Periodicals Collections. Front Window Gallery has featured a collection of La Prade's black-and-white photographs, including candid portraits of Chuck Close, John Baldessari, among others. A page from a pocket notebook, where artist David Hammons had inscribed a disconnected phone number, appeared encased in a shadow box with the title, This Is Not David Hammons's Phone #, c. 2013, at an Off Paradise group show, Nothing of the Month Club, at 120 Walker Street, New York, from January 27 through April 27, 2021.

La Prade is one of the subjects in a series of portrait photographs by Lucas Samaras, which includes Cindy Sherman and Lisa Yuskavage, among others, titled Poses / Born Actors, housed in the collection of the National Gallery of Art in Washington DC.

== Bibliography ==
- A Plague Year, Olympia, WA: Last Word Press, 2021 ISBN 978-1-94423442-3
- Weather & Other Poems, Olympia, WA: Last Word Press, 2020 ISBN 978-1-944234-36-2
- Fourteen Minutes: Selected Poems, By Tomasz Marek Sobieraj, Translated by Erik La Prade, Oyster Bay, New York: Cross-Cultural Communications, 2018 ISBN 978-0-89304-284-4
- Neglected Powers, Olympia, WA: Last Word Press, 2017 ISBN 978-1-944234-12-6
- Movie Logic, Hoboken, NJ: Poets Wear Prada, 2013 ISBN 978-0-615-76123-7
- False Confessions, Palo Alto, CA: Alternating Current (Propaganda Press), 2011
- BREAKING THROUGH: Richard Bellamy and The Green Gallery, 1960–1965: Twenty-three Interviews, New York: MidMarch Arts Press, 2010 ISBN 978-1-877675-78-2
- SWATCHES, Hoboken, NJ: Poets Wear Prada, 2008 ISBN 978-0-9817678-1-9
- Figure Studies: Poems, New York: Linear Arts Books, 2000 ISBN 978-1-891219-89-4
- Things Maps Don't Show, Del Mar, CA: Aegis Press, 1995
