= Priyanga Amarasekare =

Ecologist and evolutionary biologist

- Citizenship: American
- Education: University of Hawaiʻi at Mānoa; (PhD institution if different)
- Known for: Trophic ecology; biodiversity; species dispersal; impacts of climate change
- Awards: Guggenheim Fellowship (2021); ESA Robert H. MacArthur Award (2022)
- Scientific career
- Fields: Ecology, Evolutionary Biology, Mathematical Biology
- Workplaces: University of California, Los Angeles

Priyanga Amarasekare is an American ecologist. She was a Professor of Ecology and Evolutionary Biology at the University of California, Los Angeles (UCLA), and is a distinguished fellow of the Ecological Society of America (ESA). Her research is in the fields of mathematical biology and trophic ecology, with a focus on understanding patterns of biodiversity, species dispersal and the impacts of climate change. She received a 2021 Guggenheim Fellowship and received ESA's Robert H. MacArthur Award in 2022. She was dismissed from her faculty position at UCLA in January 2026.

== Career ==
Amarasekare earned a Master of Science in zoology from the University of Hawai'i at Manoa in 1991. Her thesis was titled Potential impact of mammalian nest predators on Mamane-Naio woodland birds of Mauna Kea, Hawaii. After her PhD, she worked at the University of Chicago.

Amarasekare is a Professor of Ecology and Evolutionary Biology at the University of California, Los Angeles (UCLA). Her research focuses on biological and ecological mechanisms that maintain biological diversity in variable environments and how understanding of these dynamics can predict how patterns of diversity may change in variable environments.

Her work is distinguished for its strong mechanistic focus combined with a tight integration between theory and data. She has been a leading figure in the field of mathematical biology as her studies have sought to find results that definitively highlight the non-linearities of biological systems through mathematical analyses. Amarasekare's work has made significant contributions to the dynamics of population regulation, species interactions and the evolution of dispersal, as well as the effect of climate change on the diversity of multi-trophic communities.

From 2004 to 2005, Amarasekare served as the vice chair officer of the Ecological Society of America's Theory Section. She subsequently served as Chair Officer of the Theory Section from 2005 to 2006.

In 2017, Amarasekare was named a Fellow of the Ecological Society of America for "distinguished contributions to theoretical ecology, particularly our understanding of the spatial and temporal dynamics of populations and communities."

Following administrative hearings in September 2021, UCLA suspended Amarasekare for one year without pay beginning in June 2022 and with a 20 percent salary reduction for the subsequent two years. She is also barred from entering UCLA facilities, communicating with students, or accessing NSF-funded research during this time. The university did not publicly disclose the reasons for her suspension, and prohibited her from disclosing them either. But, a released copy of the hearing committee's report suggests that Amarasekare was alleged to have breached confidentiality and called attention to discriminatory behavior by her colleagues, with the committee recommending only a censure. When the report was referred to chancellor Gene Block, the chancellor instead enacted a suspension. More than 500 scientists from around the world signed a January 2023 petition calling for Amarasekare's reinstatement. She was placed on administrative leave immediately following the end of her suspension and remains on leave one year later (as of July 2024).

== Selected publications ==
- The metacommunity concept: a framework for multi‐scale community ecology. Ecology letters, 7(7), 601–613.
- Why intraspecific trait variation matters in community ecology. Trends in ecology & evolution, 26(4), 183–192.
- Pollen limitation of plant reproduction: ecological and evolutionary causes and consequences. Ecology, 85(9), 2408–2421.
- Competitive coexistence in spatially structured environments: a synthesis. Ecology letters, 6(12), 1109–1122.
- Spatial heterogeneity, source-sink dynamics, and the local coexistence of competing species. The American Naturalist, 158(6), 572–584.
