= Jason Nieh =

American computer scientist

- Education: MIT; Stanford University
- Scientific career
- Workplaces: Columbia University
- Thesis: The design, implementation, and evaluation of SMART: A scheduler for multimedia applications (1999)
- Doctoral advisor: Monica S. Lam
- Website: www.cs.columbia.edu/~nieh/

Jason Nieh is a professor of computer science and co-director of the Software Systems Laboratory at Columbia University. He was the technical advisor to nine States regarding the Microsoft antitrust settlement and has been an expert witness before the United States International Trade Commission. He was Chief Scientist of Desktone, which was purchased by VMware, and currently holds the same position at CertiK.

Nieh is most well known for his work on virtualization. He was one of the early pioneers of operating system-level virtualization, introducing key concepts such as process namespaces and file system layers which led to the development of Linux containers and Docker. He was an early proponent of desktop virtualization, conducting many of the early studies demonstrating the feasibility of Virtual Desktop Infrastructure. He developed and influenced many key technologies for Arm virtualization, including the Linux ARM hypervisor, KVM ARM, and Arm architecture features to support virtualization host extensions, nested virtualization, and confidential computing. He was also the first to introduce virtual machines and virtual appliances to teach hands-on computer science courses such as operating systems, which has now become common practice at universities all over the world.

== Recognition ==
- 2024: AAAS Fellow "for distinguished contributions to the field of computer systems, particularly for innovations in virtualization technology"
- 2021: Guggenheim Fellowship in computer science
- 2021: Jay Lepreau Award
- 2019: ACM Fellow "for contributions to operating systems, virtualization, and computer science education"
- 2019: IEEE Fellow "for contributions to virtualization, scheduling, and mobile computing"
- 2014: Kenneth C. Sevcik Award
- 2012: SIGCSE Best Paper Award
- 2011: Symposium on Operating Systems Principles Best Paper Award
- 2004: International Conference on Mobile Computing and Networking Best Paper Award
- 2004: Sigma Xi Young Investigator Award
