= Jonathan Rodden =

American political scientist

- Born: Jonathan Andrew Rodden; August 18, 1971 (age 54); St. Louis, Missouri
- Education: University of Michigan; Yale University
- Scientific career
- Fields: Political science
- Institutions: Stanford University School of Humanities and Sciences
- Thesis: Federalism and soft budget constraints (1999)
- Doctoral advisor: Geoffrey Garrett; Susan Rose-Ackerman

Jonathan A. Rodden (born August 18, 1971) is an American political scientist. He is a professor of political science at the Stanford University School of Humanities and Sciences and a senior fellow at the Hoover Institution and the Stanford Institute for Economic Policy Research.

Rodden was born August 18, 1971, in St. Louis. He completed a B.A. in political science at University of Michigan in 1993. Rodden was a Fulbright Scholar at the Leipzig University from 1993 to 1994. He earned a Ph.D. in political science at Yale University in 2000.

== Award ==
- 2025 Andrew Carnegie Fellow

== Selected works ==
- Rodden, Jonathan A. (2006). Hamilton's Paradox: The Promise and Peril of Fiscal Federalism. Cambridge University Press. ISBN 978-0-521-84269-3.
- Rodden, Jonathan A.; Eskeland, Gunnar S.; Litvack, Jennie Ilene, eds. (2003). Fiscal Decentralization and the Challenge of Hard Budget Constraints. MIT Press. ISBN 978-0-262-18229-4.
- Rodden, Jonathan A.; Wibbels, Erik, eds. (2019). Decentralized Governance and Accountability: Academic Research and the Future of Donor Programming. Cambridge University Press. ISBN 978-1-108-49790-9.
- Rodden, Jonathan A. (2019). Why Cities Lose: The Deep Roots of the Urban-Rural Political Divide. Basic Books. ISBN 978-1-5416-4425-0.
