= Peter Williams (painter) =

Painter

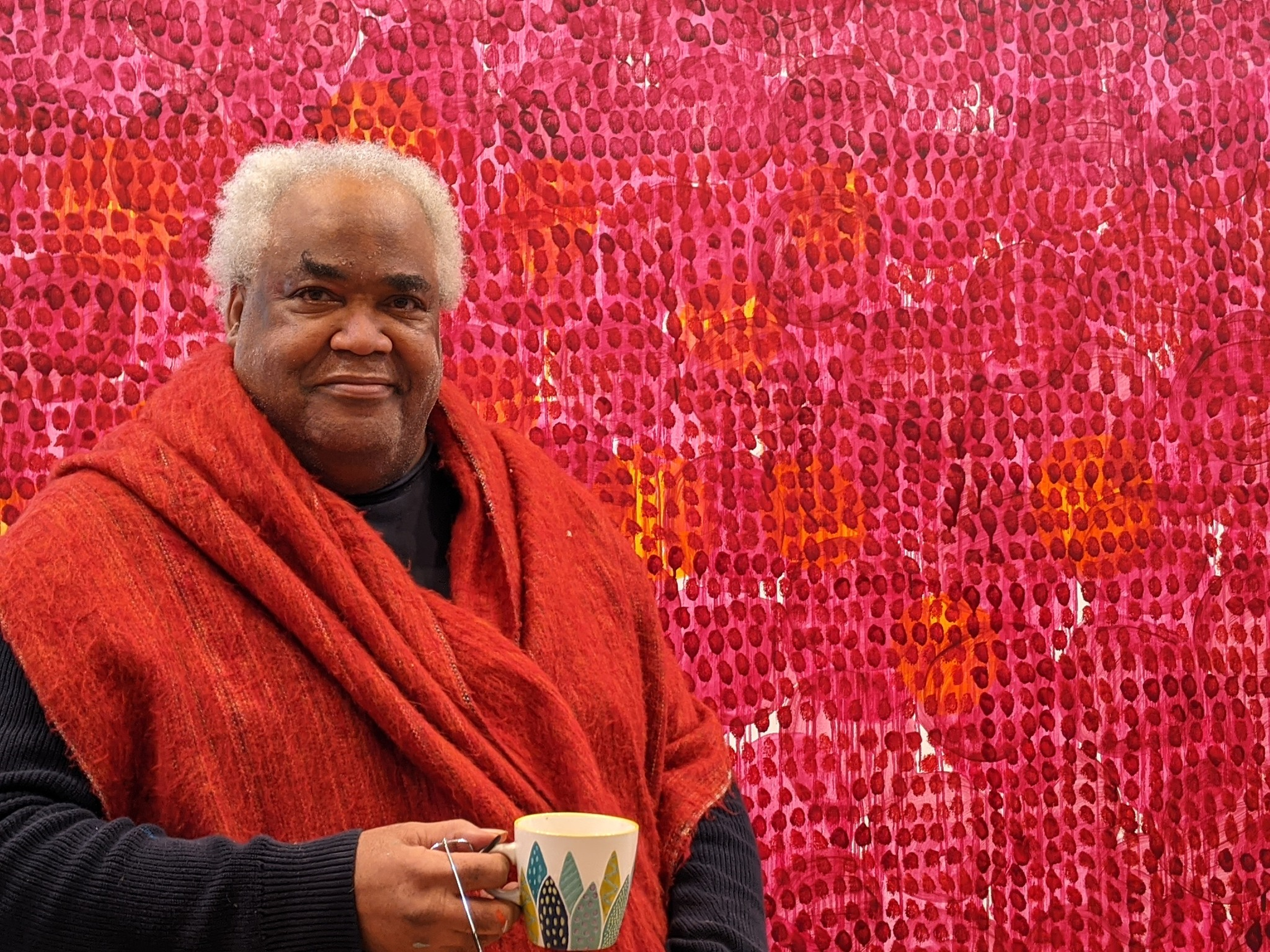
- Born: March 18, 1952; Nyack, New York
- Died: August 19, 2021 (aged 69); Wilmington, Delaware
- Years active: 1969-2021

Peter Beresford Williams (March 18, 1952 – August 19, 2021) was an American painter, educator, and social activist. His paintings have been described by writer and artist William Eckhardt Kohler as "in no particular order: hallucinogenic, acerbic, pained, beautiful, confessional, obsessive, critical, jarring, wild, weird, and profoundly human". In 2020, Williams received the Artists' Legacy Foundation Artist Award.

== Early life ==
Peter Beresford Williams was born on March 18, 1952, in Suffern, New York, and grew up in Nyack, New York. He had his first solo show at the Pat Merenstein Gallery in Nyack at the age of 17. Soon after his work was exhibited at other venues, including the Woodstock Music Festival. He graduated from the Minneapolis College of Art and Design in 1975 with a B.F.A, and in 1987 received his M.F.A. from the Maryland Institute College of Art, in Baltimore, Maryland.

== Style ==
Poet and art critic John Yau has described his paintings as "...reminiscent of both India and the child’s board game Candyland, but the world Williams depicts, and this includes the abstract paintings, is a vulnerable one where everything has either gone haywire or is about to. [...] Compassion is rare in contemporary art, and Williams gets it just right, which is to say there isn’t a trace of sentimentality in his work. [...] Williams is able to infuse his paintings with a sense of humor that is simultaneously tender and terrifying."

The University of Delaware's UDaily described him as "a contemporary artist, whose complex, narrative paintings offer a commentary on issues of race and culture in modern society. [...] His art reflects his social consciousness about issues of race, class and popular culture."

The Artists' Legacy Foundation described his work as thus: "For more than four decades, Williams has created artworks that explore contemporary culture, racism, police brutality, incarceration, environmentalism, and voyeurism through an approachable visual style. His paintings encourage the viewer to look deeply at the canvas for clues and insight about the Black experience. For example, pattern and distortion represent the conditions and circumstances that disrupt Black lives. Defying categorization, his painting style incorporates varying levels of abstraction, figuration, narrative, and iconographic elements. He draws inspiration from posters, comics, and the vibrant colors of city life."

”

Art Critic Barry Schwabsky has written that "The one thing Williams’s figurative paintings share with his abstractions is their intense, assertive, joyously inharmonious color [...] an almost aggressively fruity palette."

In speaking of Williams' show at Foxy Production, William Eckhardt Kohler wrote that "through playful form, seductive color and an apparently populist cartoonyness, Williams invites us to live with uncomfortable, unanswerable questions."

== Honors and awards ==
Williams received the Ford Foundation Fellowship in 1985. In 1996 he worked on the Mercedes-Benz Project in Detroit, Michigan; he and his students worked on a large project of 11,000 square feet, painting walls, ceiling, and floor for the Mercedes-Benz display that was shown in Detroit, Barcelona, and Frankfurt. In 2002, he participated in the Whitney Biennial.

In 2018 he was inducted into the National Academy of Design, in 2020 he received the Artists' Legacy Foundation Award, and in 2021 he was awarded The American Academy of Arts and Letters Purchase Award, and a few months later the Guggenheim Fellowship.

== Exhibitions and features ==
Institutions where Williams currently has paintings on display include the Smithsonian American Art Museum, the Delaware Art Museum, the Whitney Museum of American Art, the Detroit Institute of Arts, and multiple University collections.

He has had solo shows at the Museum of Contemporary Art Detroit, the Fort Wayne Museum of Art, Rhodes College, and the CUE Art Foundation. Exhibitions containing Williams' work have appeared at the Crystal Bridges Museum of American Art, the San Antonio Museum of Art, the Addison Gallery of American Art, Carnegie Mellon University, the Armory Center for the Arts, Wayne State University, the Detroit Institute of Art, and the University of Michigan Slusser Gallery.

In 2023, Williams work was included in the exhibition and accompanying scholar book Spirit in the Land, organized and exhibited at the Nasher Museum of Art at Duke University, North Carolina, which later traveled to the Pérez Art Museum Miami, Florida in 2024.

His work has been featured in The New York Times, Forbes, the Los Angeles Times, the Detroit Metro Times, The Nation, and HuffPost.

In 2016, the Detroit-based publisher Rotland Press published a monograph The N-Word: Paintings by Peter Williams, with an interview between Williams and the poet, playwright, educator and activist Bill Harris.

== Personal life ==
While in New Mexico, a major automobile accident led to the amputation of his right leg above the knee, forcing him to walk using arm crutches for the remainder of his life. In 2020, Williams retired from his position as a professor at the University of Delaware.

Peter Williams died in Wilmington, Delaware, on August 19, 2021, at the age of 69.
