= Tarek El-Ariss =

Professor of Middle Eastern studies

- Born: 1973 (age 52–53); Beirut, Lebanon American
- Education: Bachelor’s in Philosophy, American University of Beirut Master's in Comparative Literature, University of Rochester PhD in Comparative Literature, Cornell University
- Occupations: James Wright Professor and Chair of Middle Eastern Studies at Dartmouth College; novelist
- Notable work: Trials of Arab Modernity: Literary Affects and the New Political (2013) Leaks, Hacks, and Scandals: Arab Culture in the Digital Age (2019) Water on Fire: A Memoir of War (2023)
- Website: https://tarekelariss.com/

Tarek El-Ariss (Arabic: طارق العريس) (born 1973) is the James Wright Professor and Chair of Middle Eastern Studies at Dartmouth College, as well as an accomplished novelist and author of Water on Fire: A Memoir of War.

== Education ==
Tarek El-Ariss was born in 1973 in Beirut during the Lebanese Civil War (1975-1990). He earned a BA in Philosophy from the American University of Beirut and a PhD in Comparative Literature from Cornell University. Trained in philosophy, literary studies, and visual and cultural studies, his research focuses largely on concepts of modernity, the nation, and community in Arabic and comparative literature, visual and popular culture, and new media. Specifically, El-Ariss focuses on Arabic literature, culture, and the arts; literary theory, new media, and digital humanities; Nahda and modernity studies; travel writing and the war novel; sci-fi and utopia studies; 18th- and 19th-century French philosophy and literature; and gender and sexuality studies.

== Literary career ==
El-Ariss’s first book Trials of Arab Modernity: Literary Affects and the New Political (Fordham, 2013) examines the Arab encounter with Europe in the modern age, bridging the gap between the Nahda (the so-called Arab project of Enlightenment) and postcolonial and postmodern fiction. Challenging prevalent conceptualizations of modernity, which treat it either as a Western ideology imposed by colonialism or as a universal narrative of progress and innovation, this study instead offers close readings of the simultaneous performances and contestations of modernity. It examines closely works by authors such as Rifa’a al-Tahtawi, Ahmad Faris al-Shidyaq, Tayeb Salih, Hanan al-Shaykh, Hamdi Abu Golayyel, and Ahmad Alaidy. In dialogue with affect theory, deconstruction, and psychoanalysis, the book reveals these trials to be a violent and ongoing confrontation with and within modernity.

His second book, Leaks, Hacks, and Scandals: Arab Culture in the Digital Age (Princeton, 2019), explores the Arab encounter with cyberspace. Focusing on a new generation of digital activists and authors, El-Ariss connects WikiLeaks to The Arabian Nights, cyberattacks to pre-Islamic tribal raids, and digital activism to the affective scene-making of Arab popular culture. He shifts the epistemological and historical frameworks from the postcolonial condition to the digital condition and shows how new media challenge the novel as the traditional vehicle for political consciousness and intellectual debate. Theorizing the rise of “the leaking subject” who reveals, contests, and writes through chaotic yet highly political means, the book explores the changing landscape of Arab modernity in the digital age and traces how concepts such as the nation, community, power, the intellectual, the author, and the novel are hacked and recoded through new modes of confrontation, circulation, and dissent.

In 2021, El-Ariss earned a Guggenheim Fellowship to complete his new book, Water on Fire: A Memoir of War. Alternating between his perspective as a child and adult, the book explores how we live with trauma, poignantly illustrating the profound impact of war on our perception of the world, our fears and desires. His personal memoir is at once historical and universal, intellectual and introspective, the outcome of a long and painful process of excavation that reveals internal turmoil and the predicament of conflict and separation. It is a story about objects and elements, like water and fire, and about how encountering these elements triggers associations, connecting present and past, time and space.

El-Ariss is the editor of The Arab Renaissance: A Bilingual Anthology of the Nahda (MLA, 2018) and co-editor of Queer Affects, Special Issue of International Journal of Middle Eastern Studies (2013). He is the recipient of the EUME fellowship at the Forum for Transregional Studies in Berlin (2012–13) and of the American Council of Learned Societies (ACLS) (2015–16). His work has been reviewed in The New York Times, Times Literary Supplement, and Choice.

== Works ==
- Trials of Arab Modernity: Literary Affects and the New Political (2013)
- Leaks, Hacks, and Scandals: Arab Culture in the Digital Age (2019)
- Water on Fire: A Memoir of War (2023)
- Queer Affects (ed., 2013)
- The Arab Renaissance: A Bilingual Anthology of the Nahda (ed.)
