= On Being Ill =

Essay by Virginia Woolf

First edition cover Design by Vanessa Bell

On Being Ill is an essay by Virginia Woolf, which seeks to establish illness as a serious subject of literature along the lines of love, jealousy and battle. Woolf writes about the isolation, loneliness, and vulnerability that disease may bring and how it can make even the maturest of adults feel like children again.

== Composition and publication ==
The essay was written in 1925, when she was 42 years old, while she was in bed shortly after experiencing a nervous breakdown. It first appeared in T. S. Eliot's The Criterion in January, 1926, and was later reprinted, with revisions, in Forum in April 1926, under the title Illness: An Unexploited Mine.

It was then published as a standalone volume by Woolf's Hogarth Press in 1930, in a small edition of 250 copies typeset by Woolf herself. It was later included in two collections of her essays, The Moment and Other Essays (1947) and Collected Essays (1967). By 2001, however, it had been out of print for 70 years. In 2001, scholars were exploring the rare book collection of Smith College looking for overlooked works by Woolf to re-examine for an upcoming conference on Woolf, which led them to the Hogarth Press copy of On Being Ill. The essay was republished by Paris Press in 2002.

== Summary ==
Woolf spends a great portion of the essay comparing her moments of illness to regular daily life. Her piece indicates that she preferred the former over the latter; in fact, while ill, she was greatly inspired creatively since there were no distractions or responsibilities in her way, and she could enjoy some of her favorite pastimes like reading books, or even simply staring at the sky. She loved to gaze at it so much that two full pages of the essay are dedicated to what she saw when she looked up. Whatever it is that she chose to do, she could do it without being judged, which she really appreciated.

Another privilege of illness in Woolf's eyes is its aspect of childhood. When ill, she can get the same type of undivided attention from her caregivers as a child can get from their mother, which provides her with the sense of protection she always longed for. However, she explains that this regression may happen due to the vulnerable and unpredictable grounds of illness, which are not always so enjoyable. They may lead to loneliness and isolation at times.

All of these thoughts were Woolf's attempts at answering one overarching question: why do literature and culture not have illness as one of their central themes, like love and battle? It is so common and change-inducing, yet it was not discussed nearly as much as she would expect during her time. To further explore this, she discusses how the English language as well as its authors allow matters of the mind to be easily expressed, but not those of the body.

== Analysis ==
Woolf's descriptions of mind and body indicate that the Cartesian answer to the mind-body problem that says the two are separated did not resonate with her. She questions those who have so long written about the mind and its doings but ignore the body although they are "slaves" to each other, showing that she believed the two are one and the same and should be treated like so not only in literature, but in culture as well. This complements her idea that language does not do justice to what the body goes through in the face of illness.

Her appreciation for the nothingness that being ill allows her to enjoy also shows her realization that this condition gives people the opportunity to be removed from the busyness of life and from the sense of belonging to society even if only for a second and perhaps start paying attention to the small details of the world that many times go by unnoticed. She even refers to these moments as "moments of being." In her eyes, what this ultimately does is that it gifts people with an almost mystic superpower to give a new meaning to things, as they are able to look beneath the surface and develop a completely new understanding of existence.

Considering that throughout Woolf's lifetime she was at different points diagnosed with influenza, pneumonia, and depression, which caused countless nervous bouts and eventually led her to take her own life, she experienced all of these moments and feelings once and again, which explain her reverence for what illness does to whomever it strikes.

Although Woolf's main claim in this essay was that illness needed a bigger place in literature, its role had already expanded by the time she was writing. However, this had been done mostly by male writers like Thomas Mann or Marcel Proust, and her efforts helped give women's voices more recognition in the area.

== Reception ==
Although the work was printed in multiple venues during Woolf's lifetime, it did not attract sustained critical attention until it was republished in 2002, at which point it experienced a resurgence of interest. The essay was included on the Los Angeles Times list of best poetry for 2002. It became particularly popular with doctors, scholars of medical history, and academics who have experienced severe illness.
