= Tisa Wenger =

American historian (born 1969)

- Born: 1969 (age 56–57); Sierra Leone
- Occupation: Historian
- Spouse: Rod Groff
- Awards: Guggenheim Fellowship (2021)

Academic background
- Education: Eastern Mennonite University; Claremont Graduate University; Princeton University Graduate School
- Thesis: Savage debauchery or sacred communion? Religion and the primitive in the Pueblo dance controversy (2002)
- Doctoral advisor: Leigh E. Schmidt

Academic work
- Discipline: History
- Sub-discipline: History of religion in the United States
- Institutions: Arizona State University; Yale Divinity School

Tisa Joy Wenger (born 1969) is an American historian centered on religion in the United States. A 2021 Guggenheim Fellow, she is the author of We Have a Religion (2009) and Religious Freedom: The Contested History of an American Ideal (2017) and co-editor of Religion and U.S. Empire: Critical New Histories (2022). She has worked as a professor at Arizona State University and Yale Divinity School.

== Biography ==
Tisa Joy Wenger was born in 1969 in Sierra Leone to Christine and Harold Wenger, Mennonite missionaries who operated throughout Africa. She got her BA (1991) in English at Eastern Mennonite University, where she also made national headlines for introducing Virginia state legislator J. Samuel Glasscock at the college's Amnesty International-funded anti-death penalty forum. As a graduate student, she obtained her MA (1997) in Women's Studies in Religion at Claremont Graduate University, before going to Princeton University Graduate School to get a second MA (1999) and her PhD (2002) in Religion; her doctoral dissertation Savage debauchery or sacred communion? Religion and the primitive in the Pueblo dance controversy was advised by Leigh E. Schmidt.

Wenger originally worked as a 2002–2003 Bill and Rita Clements Research Fellow at Southern Methodist University's William P. Clements Center for Southwest Studies and as acting associate director of the Princeton University Center for the Study of Religion (2003–2004). In 2004, she became assistant professor at the Arizona State University Department of Religious Studies. She moved to Yale Divinity School in 2009 and was promoted to associate professor in 2014 and full professor in 2022.

Wenger's academic research is centered on the history of religion in the United States. She is the author of We Have a Religion (2009) and Religious Freedom: The Contested History of an American Ideal (2017), as well as co-editor of the volume Religion and U.S. Empire: Critical New Histories (2022). In 2026 she published Spirits of Empire: How Settler Colonialism Made American Religion. She and Laura R. Olson are the editors of University Press of Kansas' series Studies in US Religion, Politics, and Law, and she was the guest editor of an issue of Pacific Historical Review, "Religion in the Nineteenth-Century American West". In 2021, she was awarded a Guggenheim Fellowship in Religion.

Wenger has three children with her husband Rod Groff. Originally baptized into her parents' faith as a teenager, she and her family had switched to Unitarian Universalism by 2019.

== Bibliography ==
- We Have a Religion (2009)
- Religious Freedom: The Contested History of an American Ideal (2017)
- (ed. with Sylvester Johnson) Religion and U.S. Empire: Critical New Histories (2022)
- Spirits of Empire: How Settler Colonialism Made American Religion (2026)
