= Geneviève Zubrzycki =

Geneviève Zubrzycki (born c. 1970) is Professor of Sociology (2003–present) and Director of the Weiser Center for Europe and Eurasia, the Copernicus Center for Polish Studies, and the Center for European Studies at the University of Michigan. She is also affiliated with the Frankel Center for Judaic Studies at the University of Michigan.

Born and raised in Quebec City, Canada, she holds degrees from McGill University (B.A., 1992), the Université de Montréal (M.Sc., sociology, 1995), and the University of Chicago (Ph.D., sociology, 2002). She received a Guggenheim Fellowship in 2021.

== Books ==
Zubrzycki is a comparative-historical and cultural sociologist who studies national identity and religion, collective memory and national mythology, and visual culture and materiality.

Her book The Crosses of Auschwitz: Nationalism and Religion in Post-Communist Poland (University of Chicago Press, 2006, ISBN 0-226-99304-3, 277pp.) analyzes the relationship between national identity and Catholicism in Poland after the fall of Communism via an examination of memory wars between Poles and Jews, and the international conflict over the presence of Christian symbols at Auschwitz-Birkenau. It was translated into Polish as Krzyże w Auschwitz. Tożsamość narodowa, nacjonalizm i religia w postkomunistycznej Polsce (Nomos, 2014, ISBN 9788376881713, 295 pp.) and earned her several awards: The "AAASS and Orbis Books Outstanding Book Award in Polish Studies" from the American Association for the Advancement of Slavic Studies (2007), the "Distinguished Book Award" from the American Sociological Association’s Sociology of Religion Section(2007); and the "Biennial Kulczycki Book Prize" from the Polish Studies Association (2008).

Beheading the Saint: Nationalism, Religion and Secularism in Quebec (University of Chicago Press 2016, ISBN 9780226391717, 224 pp.) analyzed the discursive, ritual and visual genesis of a Catholic French-Canadian ethnic identity in the 19th century, and its transformation into a secular Québécois national identity in the second half of the 20th century. The book also investigates investigating the role of Québécois nationalism in recent debates over immigration, the place of religious symbols in the public sphere, and the politics of cultural heritage—shedding light on similar debates elsewhere in the world. It received the Distinguished Contribution to Scholarship Book Award from the American Sociological Association's Political Sociology Section (2017), the Canadian Sociology and Anthropology Association's John Porter Prize (2018), and the International Society for the Study of Religion (ISSR) Best Book Award (2019). In 2020, the book appeared in French (Jean-Baptiste décapité. Nationalisme, religion et sécularisme au Québec [Ed. Boréal 2020]) and in Polish (Spokojna rewolucja. Tożsamość narodowa, religia is sekularizm w Quebecu [wyd. Nomos])

(Editor and author) National Matters: Materiality, Culture and Nationalism (Stanford University Press, 2017, ISBN 9781503602533, 288 pp) is a collection of "theoretically grounded and empirically rich case studies" that "investigate the role of material culture and materiality in defining and solidifying national identity in everyday practice."

Resurrecting the Jew: Nationalism, Philosemitism, and Poland's Jewish Revival (Princeton University Press 2022), analyzes the current revival of Jewish communities in Poland and non-Jewish Poles’ interest in all things Jewish. It draws on a decade of participant-observation in Jewish and Jewish-related organizations in Poland, a Birthright trip to Israel with young Polish Jews, and more than a hundred interviews with Jewish and non-Jewish Poles engaged in the Jewish revival. The book shows how the revival has been spurred by progressive Poles who want to break the association between Polishness and Catholicism and promote the idea of a multicultural Poland, raising urgent questions relevant far beyond Poland about the limits of performative solidarity and empathetic forms of cultural appropriation.

In addition to her scholarship, Zubrzycki is co-editor of the Cambridge University Press journal Comparative Studies of Society and History, and serves on the editorial boards of the American Journal of Cultural Sociology, Rercherches sociographiques, Sociologie et Sociétés, The Polish Review and Kultura i Społeczeństwo. She was elected chair of the American Sociological Association's Sociology of culture (2014–17), was a council member of the ASA's Sociology of Religion section (2014–17) and served as the secretary-treasurer of the ASA's Comparative-Historical Sociology section (2006–09). She serves on the advisory boards of The Reckoning Project: Ukraine Testifies, the Foundation for Jewish Studies in Wrocław (Poland), and the Centre de recherche interdisciplinaire sur la diversité et la démocratie at Université du Québec à Montréal.

== Selected works ==
- The Crosses of Auschwitz: Nationalism and Religion in Post-Communist Poland (University of Chicago Press, 2006, ISBN 0-226-99304-3, 277pp.)
- Beheading the Saint: Nationalism, Religion and Secularism in Quebec (University of Chicago Press, 2016, ISBN 9780226391717, 224 pp.)
- Resurrecting the Jew: Nationalism, Philosemitism, and Poland's Jewish Revival (Princeton University Press, 2022, ISBN 9780691237237, 288 pp.)
