= Ronit Ricci =

Israeli historian

- רונית ריצ'י
- Occupation: Historian
- Awards: Guggenheim Fellowship (2021); Member of the Israel Academy of Sciences and Humanities (2022)

Academic background
- Education: Hebrew University of Jerusalem; University of Michigan
- Thesis: Translating Conversion in South and Southeast Asia: The Islamic Book of One Thousand Questions in Javanese, Tamil and Malay (2006)
- Doctoral advisor: Nancy K. Florida

Academic work
- Discipline: History
- Sub-discipline: Indonesian studies; Islamic studies
- Institutions: Australian National University; Hebrew University of Jerusalem

Ronit Ricci (Hebrew: רונית ריצ'י) is an Israeli historian. She is the Sternberg-Tamir Chair in Comparative Cultures at the Hebrew University of Jerusalem. A 2021 Guggenheim Fellow, she specializes in Indonesian studies and Islamic studies and has authored the books Islam Translated (2011) and Banishment and Belonging (2020) and edited such books as Exile in Colonial Asia (2016) and Contentious Belonging (2019).

== Biography ==
Ronit Ricci was raised in Jerusalem and educated at the Hebrew University of Jerusalem (HUJI), where she got her BA in Indian Languages and Literatures and Psychology and her MAs in Indian Languages and Literatures and in Clinical Child Psychology, as well as the Rector's Award for Academic Excellence. After spending a year (1997–1998) with Cornell University's FALCON immersion program on a Rothschild Fellowship, she obtained her PhD in Comparative Literature at the University of Michigan in 2006; her doctoral dissertation, titled Translating Conversion in South and Southeast Asia: The Islamic Book of One Thousand Questions in Javanese, Tamil and Malay, was supervised by Nancy K. Florida.

After working at the Columbia University Center for Comparative Literature and Society (2007) and the Asia Research Institute, National University of Singapore (2008–2009) as a postdoctoral fellow, she began working as a lecturer at the Australian National University School of Culture, History and Language from 2010 until 2011, before being promoted to senior lecturer in 2012 and associate professor in 2013. That same year she returned to HUJI as an associate professor at the Departments of Asian Studies and Religion and was later promote to professor in 2020. She became head of India and Indonesia Studies at HUJI's Department of Asian Studies in 2017 as well as head of their Nehemia Levtzion Center for Islamic Studies in 2019, before becoming chair of the entire department itself in 2020. She was awarded the Israel Institute for Advanced Studies' Bruno Award in 2014.

Ricci generally specializes in Indonesian studies and Islamic studies, as well as the history of exile. She won the 2012 American Academy of Religion Best First Book in the History of Religions Award and the 2013 Association for Asian Studies Harry J. Benda Prize for her book Islam Translated, which connects Muslims in South Asia and Southeast Asia with Islamic literature like the Masa'il Abdallah ibn Salam. She was awarded the Israel Institute for Advanced Studies' Bruno Award in 2014. She has also edited several history volumes: Translation in Asia: Theories, Practices, Histories, on the history of translation in South and Southeast Asia. Exile in Colonial Asia (2016), on the use of exile as a punishment in colonial South and Southeast Asia; Contentious Belonging (2019), on minorities in Indonesia; and Storied Island (2023), on Javanese literature. In 2020, she authored Banishment and Belonging, a book on history of the island of Sri Lanka as an exile destination. She was awarded a Guggenheim Fellowship in 2021. In 2022, she was elected to the Israel Academy of Sciences and Humanities.

== Bibliography ==
- Islam Translated (2011)
- Translation in Asia: Theories, Practices, Histories (2011, co-editor with Jan van der Putten)
- Exile in Colonial Asia (2016, as editor)
- Contentious Belonging (2019, co-editor with Greg Fealy)
- Banishment and Belonging (2020)
- Storied Island (2023, as editor)
