= Amira Mittermaier =

German anthropologist

- Occupation: Anthropologist
- Awards: Member of the Royal Society of Canada College of New Scholars, Artists and Scientists (2014); Guggenheim Fellowship (2021)

Academic background
- Education: University of Tübingen; University of Michigan; Columbia University
- Thesis: Dreams that Matter: An Anthropology of the Imagination in Contemporary Egypt (2006)
- Doctoral advisor: Brinkley Messick

Academic work
- Discipline: Anthropology
- Institutions: Columbia University; University of Toronto

Amira Mittermaier is a German anthropologist. After getting her PhD at Columbia University, she became a professor at the University of Toronto. A 2014 Member of the Royal Society of Canada College of New Scholars, Artists and Scientists and 2021 Guggenheim Fellow, she is the author of Dreams that Matter and Giving to God.

== Biography ==
Amira Mittermaier was born to Norbert Mittermaier, a neurologist and psychiatrist, and Raifa Mittermaier, an analytical psychologist and psychotherapist from Egypt, and raised in Bavaria. Originally educated at the University of Tübingen, she obtained her BA equivalent (1997) at the University of Michigan while an exchange student there.

Following her undergraduate degree, Mittermaier moved to the Columbia University Department of Anthropology, where she obtained her MA (1999) and PhD (2006) in sociocultural anthropology; her doctoral dissertation Dreams that Matter: An Anthropology of the Imagination in Contemporary Egypt was supervised by Brinkley Messick. While at Columbia, she worked as an instructor at Parsons School of Design in 2002, and she won the Middle East Studies Association's 2005 Best Graduate Student Paper Prize. After remaining with Columbia for another year as a lecturer and postdoctoral fellow (2006–2007), she moved to the University of Toronto Department for the Study of Religion and Department of Near and Middle Eastern Civilizations in 2007. Later part of her appointment was transferred to the Department of Anthropology. Originally an assistant professor at that university, she was promoted in 2012 to associate professor and to full professor in 2020.

Mittermaier won the 2011 American Academy of Religion Book Award for Analytical-Descriptive Studies, the 2011 Chicago Folklore Prize, and the 2011 Clifford Geertz Prize in the Anthropology of Religion for her book Dreams that Matter, which focuses on the anthropology of dreams. In 2014, she was elected to the Royal Society of Canada College of New Scholars. In 2015, she served as the guest editor of an issue for academic journal Ethnos, with the theme being "The Afterlife in the Arab Spring"; it was republished as a standalone volume named The Afterlife in the Arab Spring in 2019. In 2019, she later published Giving to God, which explores zakat in Egypt following the 2011 Egyptian revolution; that book was awarded an honorable mention for the 2019 Victor Turner Prize. In 2021, she was awarded a Guggenheim Fellowship in Religion. Her forthcoming book with Duke University Press presents what she calls an "ethnography of God."

Amira Mittermaier was selected in 2023 as the top candidate for a professorship in the anthropology of religion at the University of Vienna. According to Mittermaier, after a successful negotiation meeting with the rector and receiving a draft contract, her appointment appeared to be settled. Shortly thereafter, however, the university confronted her with a tweet by Eva Blimlinger, a member of the Austrian National Council, criticizing Mittermaier for her alleged past support of the BDS movement. Mittermaier said that in a subsequent conversation with the rector, she was asked to publicly distance herself from BDS or she would not get the job. Mittermaier refused to comply, and as a result, the hiring process was terminated.

== Bibliography ==
- Dreams That Matter (2010)
- Giving to God (2019)
