= Rodrigo Valenzuela (artist) =

Chilean artist

Rodrigo Valenzuela (born 1982) is a Chilean-born award-winning contemporary visual (focusing on photography, video and installation) artist with exhibitions worldwide. He has a BA in Art History from the University of Chile, a BA in Philosophy from the Evergreen State College, Washington, and an MFA in PhotoMedia from the University of Washington. In 2017 he was appointed assistant professor in the Department of Art, UCLA School of the Arts and Architecture.

== Awards and recognitions ==
A selection of awards Valenzuela has received include:

- The Artist Trust’s Arts Innovator Award,
- Texas Contemporary Award, Texas Contemporary Art Fair,
- Individual Artist Project Award, 4Culture,
- Genius Award for Art from The Genius Foundation,
- New Works #16 Fellowship,

== Collections ==
Valenzuela's work is held in the permanent collections of the Whitney Museum of American Art, the Museum of Fine Arts, Houston, the J. Paul Getty Museum, among others.
