= Susanna Coffey =

American artist and educator (born 1949)

- Born: 1949; New London, Connecticut, US
- Education: University of Connecticut (BFA); Yale School of Art (MFA)
- Patrons: School of the Art Institute of Chicago

Susanna J. Coffey (born 1949) is an American artist and educator. She is the F. H. Sellers Professor in Painting at the School of the Art Institute of Chicago and lives and works in New York City. She was elected a member the National Academy of Design in 1999.

== Life ==
Coffey was born in New London, Connecticut in 1949. She received a Bachelor of Fine Art degree magna cum laude from the University of Connecticut in 1977 and a Master of Fine Arts degree from the Yale School of Art in 1982.

Coffey's work investigates normative values of beauty and gender asking questions like "What is a beautiful appearance? Why do conventionally gendered images involve caricature? Can inchoate feeling-states be adequately portrayed?"

Coffey is best known for her paintings of heads―often self-portraits, such as her Self Portrait, Versace (Canal) Scarf in the collection of the Honolulu Museum of Art. Like many of her paintings, this 1996 self-portrait is a frontal view, lit from behind. Hearne Pardee describes her practice in the Brooklyn Rail:

The sort of self-examination Susanna Coffey has practiced over the past three decades is far from the passive self-absorption often criticized in contemporary media. Her long practice of self-portraiture is an active investigation of cultural forms related to the self. Coffey’s art is one of empirical observation, constantly varied based on the subject she contemplates. Like a teller of tales, she’s assumed varied guises, sometimes under dramatic lighting or extreme points of view, sometimes in flamboyant costumes or exaggerated make-up; she finds constant sources of invention in her own person and in the roles our society asks us to play.

== Collections ==
'Water Years 1' oil on linen painting by Susanna Coffey, 2006, private collection

Coffey's work is held at a wide range of institutions, including Akron Art Museum in Akron, Ohio, Yale University Art Gallery, the Danforth Art Museum in Framingham MA, the Art Institute of Chicago in Chicago, the Brauer Museum of Art in Valparaiso, Indiana, the Davis Museum and Cultural Center at Wellesley College in Wellesley, Massachusetts, the Honolulu Museum of Art in Honolulu, Hawaii, the Minneapolis Institute of Arts in Minneapolis, Minnesota, the National Academy of Design in New York City, the Rockford Museum in Rockford, Illinois, the Weatherspoon Art Gallery in Greensboro, North Carolina and the Williams College Museum of Art in Williamstown, Massachusetts.

== Awards ==
Susanna Coffey has received awards from the National Endowment for the Arts and the Louis Comfort Tiffany Foundation. Coffey received a Guggenheim Fellowship, a Hirshhorn Museum and Sculpture Garden Artist x Artist award, a residency at the Rockefeller Foundation Bellagio Center, the Aeschylus Medal awarded by the city of Eleusis Greece, and the Marie Walsh Sharpe Foundation Studio Program Award. Coffey has received honorary degrees from The University of Connecticut School of Fine Art and the Lyme Academy of Fine Arts.
