= Julia Rudolph =

American historian

- Occupation: Historian
- Awards: Guggenheim Fellowship (2021)

Academic background
- Education: Brown University (BA); Columbia University (MA, MPhil, PhD)
- Thesis: Revolution by degrees: the Whig theory of resistance (1995)

Academic work
- Sub-discipline: Early modern Europe
- Institutions: Bucknell University; University of Pennsylvania; North Carolina State University

Julia Ellen Rudolph is an American historian. A 2014 Fellow of the Royal Historical Society and 2021 Guggenheim Fellow, she is author of Revolution by Degrees: James Tyrrell and Whig Political Thought in the Late Seventeenth Century (2002) and Common Law and Enlightenment in England, 1689-1750 (2013). She is a professor of history at North Carolina State University.

== Biography ==
Rudolph attended Brown University, where she obtained a BA in Classics and Renaissance Studies in 1984, and Columbia University, where she obtained an MA in 1988, MPhil in 1990, and PhD in 1995; all three Columbia degrees were in history. Her doctoral dissertation was Revolution by degrees: the Whig theory of resistance.

Originally part of the faculty of Bucknell University, Rudolph joined the University of Pennsylvania, where she was an assistant professor of history in 2006. In January 2011, she moved to North Carolina State University as an associate professor; she later became a full professor. Her teaching experience also includes recurring seminars at the Duke University School of Law and the Folger Institute.

Rudolph specializes in early modern Europe, including in the British Empire of that time, as well as intersections with women's history. She is author of Revolution by Degrees: James Tyrrell and Whig Political Thought in the Late Seventeenth Century (2002). In 2006, she published an edited volume, History and Nation, within Bucknell University Press' Aperçus series. By 2011, she was working on Common Law and Enlightenment in England, 1689-1750, which explores the history of judicial precedent; it was released in 2013 as the fifteenth volume of Boydell Press' Studies in Early Modern Cultural, Political and Social History. In 2021, she was awarded a Guggenheim Fellowship in Law; that fellowship will support her research project on mortgage lending in the British Empire and British mortgage law.

In 2014, Rudolph was elected Fellow of the Royal Historical Society. She was awarded the North American Conference on British Studies' Judith R. Walkowitz Article Prize's for her 2019 Droit & Philosophie article "Crediting Women", which addresses the weight of women’s testimony in the 18th and 19th centuries.

== Works ==
- Revolution by Degrees: James Tyrrell and Whig Political Thought in the Late Seventeenth Century (2002) (Note: Reviews of this book:)
- (ed.) History and Nation (2006)
- Common Law and Enlightenment in England, 1689-1750 (2013) (Note: Reviews of this book:)
