= Jane South =

British American artist and educator

- Occupations: Artist and educator
- Awards: 2021 Guggenheim Fellowship; 2009 Joan Mitchell Foundation Painters and Sculptors Grant; 2006 NYFA (New York Foundation for the Arts) Fellowship

Academic background
- Education: BFA Theatre Design, Central School of Art, London, UK; MFA Painting and Sculpture, UNC Greensboro
- Alma mater: University of North Carolina, Greensboro

Academic work
- Institutions: Pratt Institute, National Academy of Design

Jane South is a British American artist and educator known for large scale installations, mixed media constructions, and fabric wall pieces.

== Early life and education ==
Born in Manchester, UK, South received a BFA in Theatre Design from Central School of Art in 1987 and an MFA in Painting and Sculpture from the University of North Carolina, Greensboro in 1997.

== Career ==
South worked in experimental theater before moving to the United States in 1989. She began her academic career in 2001 with a two-year appointment at Williams College. South taught at Rhode Island School of Design (RISD) from 2013 to 2017 and was appointed Chair of Fine Arts at Pratt Institute in 2017.

She is Chair of the Siena Art Institute Advisory Board, and in 2019 was elected to the National Academy of Design.

== Works ==
South has described her work as being "influenced by the way I have seen my neighborhoods evolve (for better and worse) over the past few years. New York City in particular is de- and re-constructed so much that it exists in a constant state of undress, exposing its often dilapidated and or shoddily or cheaply constructed layers – to me it's a reminder of the illusory and temporary nature of our sense of place". For over a decade, she constructed cut-paper architectures, playing with two-and three-dimensions to create large scale installations described as "sculptural follies" that "seem to simultaneously celebrate and mourn the constructed wonders of the world".

South's 2020 solo exhibition Switch Back was described by Jillian Steinhauer in The New York Times as "what you might call soft paintings" that "evoke homemade creations like patchwork quilts and curtains as much as the post-minimalism of Eva Hesse and Robert Morris, and even Claes Oldenburg’s replicas of ordinary objects". In more recent work, "Her characteristic architectural forms and pseudo-industrial material are condensed. The past emphasis on three-dimensionality, accentuated by boxes and cages, are flattened into grids and swaths of subtle tones. Her signature paper and balsa wood constructs are replaced by tectonic assemblages of softer materials -canvas, tarp, packing foam, and thread."

South is a contributor to the book The Artist as Cultural Producer: Living and Sustaining a Creative Life. She is the recipient of a Guggenheim Fellowship (2021), Brown/RISD Mellon Foundation Fellowship (2015), and Joan Mitchell Foundation Painters and Sculptors Grant (2009).

== Selected solo exhibitions ==
- Outermost, 2026, Spencer Brownstone Gallery, NY
- Halfway Off, 2023, Spencer Brownstone Gallery, NY
- Switch Back, 2020, Spencer Brownstone Gallery, NY
- Shifting Structures, 2019, Mills Gallery, Central College, Pella, IA
- Raked, 2014, Spencer Brownstone Gallery, NY
- Floor/Ceiling, 2013, The Aldrich Contemporary Art Museum, CT
- Shifting Structures: Stacks, 2012, Site-specific installation at the New York Public Library, NY
- Box, 2010, Knoxville Museum of Art, TN
- Jane South, 2012, Spencer Brownstone Gallery, NY
- Deceptive Volume, 2008, Queens Museum, Bulova Center, NY Jane South
- Infrastructures, 2007, Second Street Gallery, Charlottesville, VA traveled to: Weatherspoon Art Museum, Greensboro, NC
- Jane South, 2006, Spencer Brownstone Gallery, NY Jane South and Savannah College of Art & Design, Lacoste Campus, France
- Jane South, 2005, Susanne Vielmetter, LA Projects, CA
- Jane South, 2004, Spencer Brownstone Gallery, NY
- All Nine, 2003, Installation at Nassauischer Kunstverein, Wiesbaden, Germany
- Working Drawing, 2003, Installation & Animation, MASS MoCA, North Adams, MA
- Jane South, 2001, Spencer Brownstone Gallery, NY
- Jane South, 1999, Anderson Museum of Contemporary Art, Roswell, NM

== Awards and honors ==
- 1998 - Roswell Artist in Residence Program, Roswell, NM
- 2002 - Arts & Humanities Grant, Williams College Center for Technology
- 2003 - MacDowell Colony Residency, Peterborough, NH
- 2004 - Joan Mitchell Foundation Residency, SFAI (Santa Fe Art Institute)
- 2006 - Fellowship in Sculpture, NYFA (New York Foundation for the Arts)
- 2007 - The Rockefeller Foundation Bellagio Center Residency
- 2008 - Pollock Krasner Foundation Grant
- 2009 - The Brown Foundation Fellows Program, Dora Maar House
- 2010 - Camargo Foundation Fellowship, Cassis, France
- 2015 - RISD Mellon Teaching Fellowship, Brown University
- 2021 - Guggenheim Fellowship
