= Jennie Litvack =

Canadian economist and horn player (1963–2019)

Jennie Ilene Litvack (1963–2019) was a Canadian economist who worked at the World Bank. From an early age, she was an enthusiastic trumpet player and was taught by Dizzy Gillespie, who considered her his god-daughter. She became proficient at blowing the ceremonial Jewish horn – the shofar – and became its Mistress (ba’alat tekiya) for Adas Israel in Washington.
