= Mario Naves =

American artist, art critic, professor and blogger (born 1961)

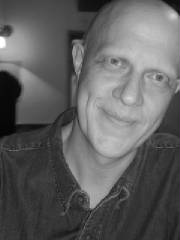
- 2010
- Born: December 30, 1961 (age 64); Salt Lake City, Utah, U.S.
- Education: University of Utah and Pratt Institute
- Occupations: Artist, art critic, professor and blogger

Mario Naves (born December 30, 1961, Salt Lake City, Utah) is an American artist, art critic, professor and blogger.

== Early life and education ==
Naves studied painting and drawing at the University of Utah, receiving a Bachelor of Fine Arts degree in 1984. He subsequently studied at Pratt Institute, where he earned a Master of Fine Arts degree in 1987, having majored in painting with a minor emphasis in art criticism.

== Career ==
Naves has stated that his works-on-paper are "painting by other means". Artist and critic Maureen Mullarkey wrote that these "means are simple. Paint is dripped, scraped, scumbled, sponged, patted and brushed on pieces of paper that are then torn and rearranged. His technique preserves the accidental aspect of the painting process while it subordinates all randomness to the cognitive, disciplined basis of traditional painting."

Naves's art has been described by The New York Times as "delicate and gorgeous" and by Art in America as "joyous, sophisticated and charming." The New York Sun stated that Naves "knows from within how a hand functions as an extension of the eye. The refinement of his touch and the sensibility that drives it is a pleasure to see."

In recent years, Naves returned to painting directly on canvas and panel. In response to his 2013 exhibition of paintings at Elizabeth Harris Gallery, John Goodrich wrote of Naves's "change in medium, and a more efficient attack that privileges compositions over texture", ultimately describing the shift from collage to painting as "revelatory".

Naves's criticism has appeared in ARTS, The New Criterion, The Wall Street Journal, New Art Examiner, City Arts and Slate. His weekly column on the New York gallery scene, "Currently Hanging", appeared in The New York Observer from 1999 to 2009. It was at the Observer that Naves established himself as a "maverick dissenter" whose "opinions are as bright and punchy as any editor could wish for."

Naves's views earned enmity and accolades. ArtNet.Com and Time Out New York cited Naves as the "worst New York art critic". Jerry Saltz, writing in The Village Voice, twice took Naves to task for his "priggish, stuffy" and "self-congratulatory bitch-slapping." Writing in Art in America, artist and critic Peter Plagens stated that Naves was among "the critics who craft the most limpid prose these days". Elsewhere, Naves has been described as a "wickedly talented critic" and a writer who "clearly know[s] something about the production side" of art-making.

His writings on visual culture can be viewed in his ongoing blog Too Much Art.

Naves has turned to curating exhibitions, organizing Intricate Expanse, a group exhibition seen at Lesley Heller Workspace.

Naves has taught and lectured at Cooper Union, the New York Studio School of Drawing, Painting and Sculpture, the University of Utah, The Painting Center, Rutgers University, Montclair State University, the National Academy of Design and the Ringling College of Art and Design.

He currently teaches at Pratt Institute, Hofstra University and Brooklyn College.

== Awards ==
- 2015 Professional Development Award, Brooklyn College
- 2010 Pollock Krasner Fellowship
- 2010 Distinguished Alumni Award, University of Utah
- 2008 John Pike Memorial Award, National Academy Museum
- 2003 George Sugarcane Foundation
- 1989 National Endowment for the Arts Fellowship
